= Gurdon Light =

Atmospheric ghost light in Gurdon, Arkansas, US

Coordinates: 33°54′55″N 93°09′19″W

The Gurdon Light is an atmospheric ghost light located near railroad tracks in a wooded area of Gurdon, Arkansas. It is the subject of local folklore and has been featured in local media and on Unsolved Mysteries and Mysteries at the Museum. The tracks are no longer in use, and the rails are at least partially removed/covered, but it remains one of the most popular Halloween attractions in the area. The light has been described as blue, green, white or orange and appearing to have a "bobbing" movement.

== Folklore ==
According to folklore, the light is the swinging lantern of a ghost brakeman accidentally beheaded by a passing train, searching for his disembodied head. Another variation of the legend holds that the light is a lantern carried by the ghost of a worker killed in a fight with another railroad employee on the tracks. According to skeptical writer Brian Dunning, very similar folklore exists for a number of such "ghost lights", and it is unlikely "headless brakemen" could be such a common occurrence.

== Explanations ==
The light has been proposed to be the reflection of passing cars on Interstate 30, but believers contend there have been reports of the lights since the 1930s, while the interstate was not built until the late 1950s.

== See also ==
- Aleya (Ghost light), Bengal
- Aurora
- Brown Mountain Lights
- Chir Batti
- Cohoke Light
- Hessdalen light
- Longdendale lights
- Maco light
- Marfa lights
- Min Min light
- Naga fireball
- Paulding Light
- Will-o'-the-wisp
