= Will-o'-the-wisp =

Atmospheric ghost lights

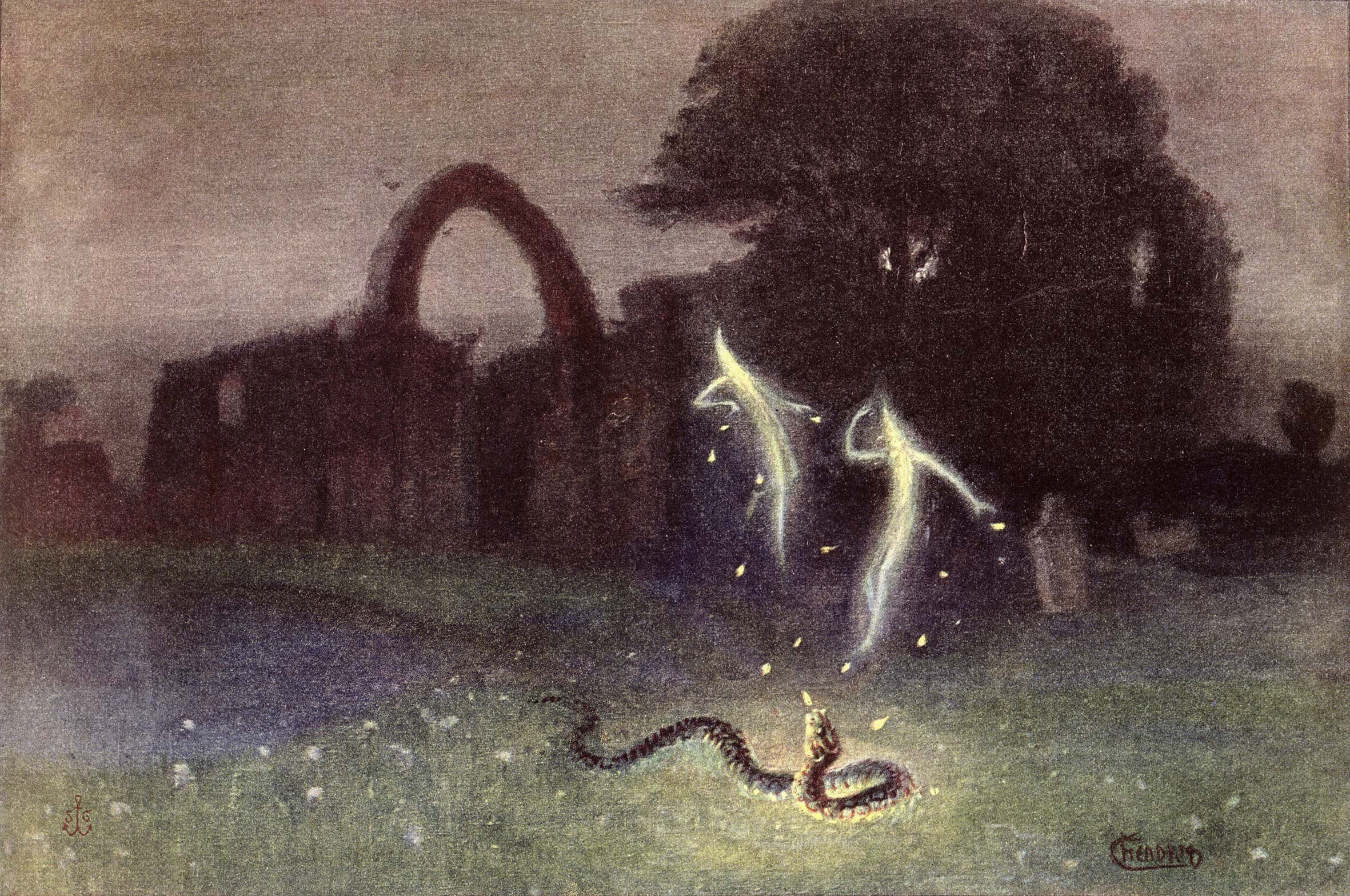
The Will o' the Wisp and the Snake by Hermann Hendrich (1854–1931)

In folklore, a will-o'-the-wisp, or will-o'-wisp (Latin: ignis fatuus, "foolish flame"), is an atmospheric ghost light seen by travellers at night, especially over bogs, swamps, or marshes.

In folklore, will-o'-the-wisps are typically attributed as ghosts, fairies or elemental spirits meant to reveal (or conceal) a path or direction. These wisps are portrayed as dancing or flowing in a static form, until noticed or followed, in which case they visually fade or disappear. Modern science explains the light aspect as natural phenomena such as bioluminescence or chemiluminescence, caused by the oxidation of phosphine (PH_{3}), diphosphane (P_{2}H_{4}) and methane (CH_{4}), produced by organic decay.

== Nomenclature ==
=== Etymology ===
The term will-o'-the-wisp comes from wisp, a bundle of sticks or paper sometimes used as a torch and the name 'Will', thus meaning 'Will of the torch'. The term jack-o'-lantern ('Jack of the lantern') originally referred to a will-o'-the-wisp. In the United States, they are often called spook-lights, ghost-lights, or orbs by folklorists.

The phenomenon is known in the United Kingdom by a variety of names, including jack-o'-lantern, (Note: Kittredge (1900), p. 440: Jack-with-a-lantern, Jack-a-Lantern, and (n3) Jack-o'-Lantern, citing Allies (1846)) friar's lantern, (Note: In Milton's L'Allegro.) and hinkypunk, and is said to mislead and/or guide travellers by resembling a flickering lamp or lantern. Equivalents of the will-o'-the-wisps appear in European folklore by various names, e.g., ignis fatuus in Latin, feu follet in French, Irrlicht or Irrwisch in Germany, dwaallicht in The Netherlands and fuoco fatuo in Italy. Equivalents occur in traditions of cultures worldwide (cf. § Global terms); e.g., the Naga fireballs on the Mekong in Thailand. In North America the phenomenon is known as the Paulding Light in Upper Peninsula of Michigan, the Spooklight in Southwestern Missouri and Northeastern Oklahoma, and St. Louis Light in Saskatchewan.

The Latin name ignis fatuus is composed of ignis, meaning 'fire' and fatuus, an adjective meaning 'foolish', 'silly' or 'simple'; it can thus be literally translated into English as 'foolish fire' or more idiomatically as 'giddy flame'. Despite its Latin origins, the term ignis fatuus is not attested in antiquity, and the name for the will-o'-the-wisp used by the ancient Romans is uncertain. The term is not attested in the Middle Ages either. Instead, the Latin ignis fatuus is documented no earlier than the 16th century in Germany, where it was coined by a German humanist, and appears to be a free translation of the long-existing German name Irrlicht ('wandering light' or 'deceiving light') conceived of in German folklore as a mischievous spirit of nature; the Latin translation was made to lend the German name intellectual credibility.

Beside Irrlicht, the will-o'-the-wisp has also been called in German Irrwisch (where Wisch translates to 'wisp'), as found in e.g. Martin Luther's writings of the same 16th century.

In Irish, it is called tine ghealáin ('flashing fire') or Seán na Gealaí ('Jack of the Moon'), a name linked to the legend of Stingy Jack and the jack o' lantern.

=== Synonyms ===
The names will-o'-the-wisp and jack-o'-lantern are used in etiological folk-tales, recorded in many variant forms in Ireland, Scotland, England, Wales, Appalachia, and Newfoundland.

Folk belief attributes the phenomenon explicitly in the term hob lantern or hobby lantern (var. 'Hob and his Lantern', 'hob-and-lanthorns"). (Note: And "Hoberdy's Lantern", "Hobany's Lantern" "Hob and his Lantern" probably corrupted from "Hob and his Lantern" accord. Kittredge, 440, n3.) In her book A Dictionary of Fairies, K. M. Briggs provides an extensive list of other names for the same phenomenon, though the place where they are observed (graveyard, bogs, etc.) influences the naming considerably. When observed in graveyards, it is known as a ghost candle or corpse candle.

== Folklore ==
=== Americas ===
Mexico has equivalents. Folklore explains the phenomenon to be witches who transformed into these lights. Another explanation refers to the lights as indicators to places where gold or hidden treasures are buried which can be found only with the help of children. In this one, they are called luces del dinero (money lights) or luces del tesoro (treasure lights).

The swampy area of Massachusetts known as the Bridgewater Triangle has folklore of ghostly orbs of light, and there have been modern observations of these ghost-lights in this area as well.

The fifollet (or feu-follet) of Louisiana derives from the French. The legend says that the fifollet is a soul sent back from the dead to do God's penance, but instead attacks people for vengeance. While it mostly takes part in harmless mischievous acts, the fifollet sometimes sucked the blood of children. Some legends say that it was the soul of a child who died before baptism.

Boi-tatá (Portuguese pronunciation: [bojtaˈta]) is the Brazilian equivalent of the will-o'-the-wisp. Regionally it is called Boitatá, Baitatá, Batatá, Bitatá, Batatão, Biatatá, M'boiguaçu, Mboitatá and Mbaê-Tata. The name comes from the Old Tupi language and means "fiery serpent" (mboî tatá). Its great fiery eyes leave it almost blind by day, but by night, it can see everything. According to legend, Boi-tatá was a big serpent which survived a great deluge. A "boiguaçu" (cave anaconda) left its cave after the deluge and, in the dark, went through the fields preying on the animals and corpses, eating exclusively its favourite morsel, the eyes. The collected light from the eaten eyes gave "Boitatá" its fiery gaze. Not really a dragon but a giant snake (in the native language, boa or mboi or mboa).

In Argentina and Uruguay, the will-o'-the-wisp phenomenon is known as luz mala (evil light) and is one of the most important myths in both countries' folklore. This phenomenon is quite feared and is mostly seen in rural areas. It consists of an extremely shiny ball of light floating a few inches from the ground.

In Paraguay, will-o'-the-wisps are interpreted in popular tradition as indicators of the so-called plata yvyguy, referring to goods buried underground that are believed to have been hidden both by the Jesuits after their expulsion in 1767 and during the Paraguayan War (1864–1870). According to popular belief, the nocturnal appearance of a brief, moving flame, which travels from one place to another and extinguishes at a specific point, marks the exact location where such a treasure is buried

In Colombia, la Bolefuego or Candileja is the will-o'-the-wisp ghost of a vicious grandmother who raised her grandchildren without morals, and as such they became thieves and murderers. In the afterlife, the grandmother's spirit was condemned to wander the world surrounded in flames. In Trinidad and Tobago, a soucouyant is a "fireball witch"—an evil spirit that takes on the form of a flame at night. It enters homes through any gap it can find and drinks the blood of its victims.

=== Asia ===
Aleya (or marsh ghost-light) is the name given to a strange light phenomenon occurring over the marshes as observed by Bengalis, especially the fishermen of Bangladesh and West Bengal. This marsh light is attributed to some kind of marsh gas apparitions that confuse fishermen, make them lose their bearings, and may even lead to drowning if one decided to follow them moving over the marshes. Local communities in the region believe that these strange hovering marsh-lights are in fact ghost-lights representing the ghosts of fisherman who died fishing. Sometimes they confuse the fishermen, and sometimes they help them avoid future dangers. Chir batti (ghost-light), also spelled "chhir batti" or "cheer batti", is a dancing light phenomenon occurring on dark nights reported from the Banni grasslands, its seasonal marshy wetlands and the adjoining desert of the marshy salt flats of the Rann of Kutch (Note: "I read somewhere that on dark nights there are strange lights that dance on the Rann. The locals call them cheer batti or 'ghost lights'. It's a phenomenon widely documented but not explained.") Other varieties (and sources) of ghost-lights appear in folklore across India, including the Kollivay Pey of Tamil Nadu, the Kolli Devva of Karnataka, the Kuliyande Choote of Kerala, and many variants from different tribes in Northeast India. In Kashmir, the Bramrachokh carries a pot of fire on its head.

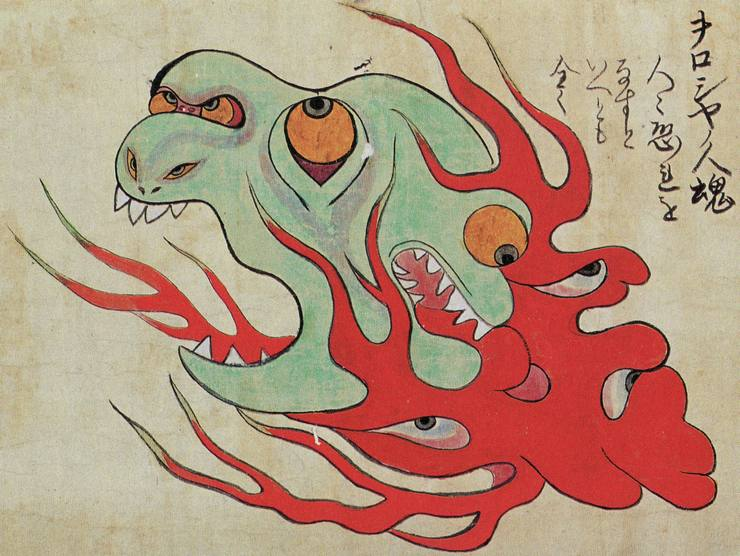
A Japanese rendition of a Russian will-o'-the-wisp

Similar phenomena are described in Japanese folklore, including hitodama (人魂; literally "Human Soul" as a ball of energy), hi no tama ("ball of flame"), aburagae, koemonbi (小右衛門火), ushionibi, etc. All these phenomena are described as associated with graveyards. Kitsune, mythical yokai demons, are also associated with will 'o the wisp, with the marriage of two kitsune producing kitsune-bi (狐火), literally meaning 'fox-fire'. These phenomena are described in Shigeru Mizuki's 1985 book Graphic World of Japanese Phantoms (妖怪伝 in Japanese).

In Korea the lights are associated with rice paddies, old trees, mountains or even in some houses and were called 'dokkebi bul' (도깨비 불), meaning goblin fire (or goblin light). They were deemed malevolent and impish, as they confused and lured passersby to lose their way or fall into pits at night.

Character 粦 in bronze script. Its shape depicts a person surrounded by fire like dots and dancing with emphasised feet.

The earliest Chinese reference to a will-o'-the-wisp appears to be the Chinese character 粦 lín, attested as far back as the Shang dynasty oracle bones, depicting a human-like figure surrounded by dots presumably representing the glowing lights of the will-o'-the-wisp, to which feet such as those under 舞 wǔ, 'to dance' were added in bronze script. Before the Han dynasty the top had evolved or been corrupted to represent fire (later further corrupted to resemble 米 mǐ, rice), as the small seal script graph in a dictionary Shuowen Jiezi, compiled in the Han dynasty, shows. The dictionary explained that it was "ghost fire" coming from dead men, horses and cattle during wars and their blood turned into this kind of fire after many years. Although no longer in use alone, 粦 lín is in the character 磷 lín phosphorus, an element involved in scientific explanations of the will-o'-the-wisp phenomenon, and is also a phonetic component in other common characters with the same pronunciation.

Chinese polymath Shen Gua may have recorded such a phenomenon in the Book of Dreams, stating, "In the middle of the reign of emperor Jia You, at Yanzhou, in the Jiangsu province, an enormous pearl was seen especially in gloomy weather. At first it appeared in the marsh… and disappeared finally in the Xinkai Lake." It was described as very bright, illuminating the surrounding countryside and was a reliable phenomenon over ten years, an elaborate Pearl Pavilion being built by local inhabitants for those who wished to observe it.

=== Europe ===
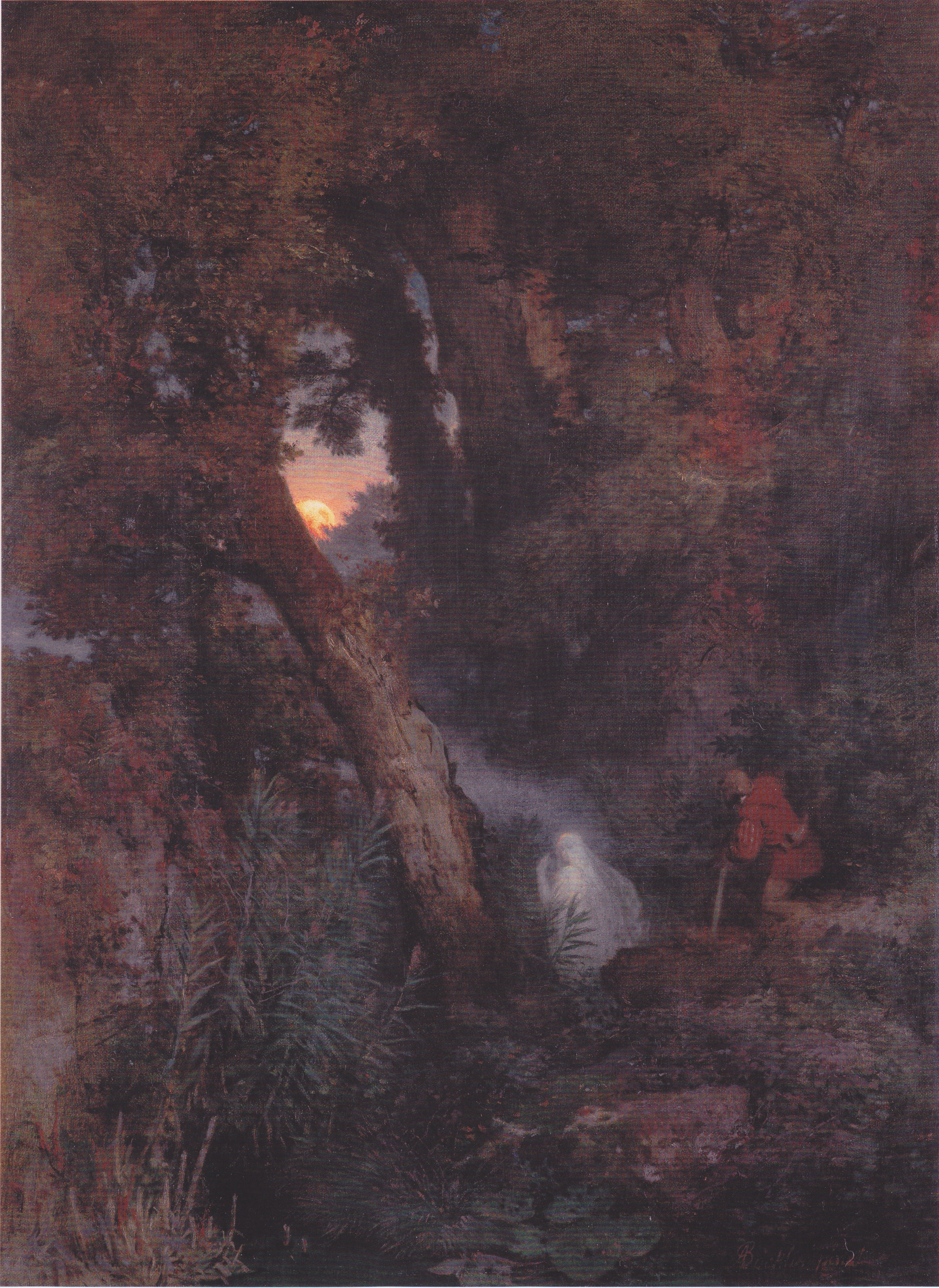
An 1862 oil painting of a will-o'-the-wisp by Arnold Böcklin

In European folklore the lights are often believed to be the spirits of un-baptised or stillborn children, flitting between heaven and hell (purgatory).

In Germany there was a belief that an Irrlicht was the soul of an unbaptised child, but that it could be redeemed if the remains are first buried near the eaves of the church, so that at the moment rainwater splashes onto this grave, the churchman could pronounce the baptismal formula to sanctify the child. (Note: Zerrenner (1783) cited by Rochholz.)

In Sweden, the will-o'-the-wisp represents the soul of an unbaptised person "trying to lead travellers to water in the hope of being baptized".

Danes, Finns, Swedes, Estonians, Latvians, Lithuanians, and Irish people and other groups believed that a will-o'-the-wisp also marked the location of a treasure deep in ground or water, which could be taken only when the fire was there. Sometimes magical procedures, and even a dead man's hand, were required as well, to uncover the treasure. In Finland and several other northern countries, it was believed that early autumn was the best time to search for will-o'-the-wisps and treasures below them. It was believed that when someone hid treasure in the ground, he made the treasure available only at the summer solstice (Midsummer, or Saint John's Day), and set a will-o'-the-wisp to mark the exact place and time so that he could reclaim the treasure.

The Aarnivalkea (also known as virvatuli, aarretuli and aarreliekki), in Finnish mythology, are spots where an eternal flame associated with will-o'-the-wisps burns. They are claimed to mark the places where faerie gold is buried. They are protected by a glamour that would prevent anyone finding them by pure chance. However, if one finds a fern seed from a mythical flowering fern, the magical properties of that seed will lead the fortunate person to these treasures, in addition to providing one with a glamour of invisibility. Since in reality the fern produces no flower and reproduces via spores under the leaves, the myth specifies that it blooms only extremely rarely.

==== Britain ====
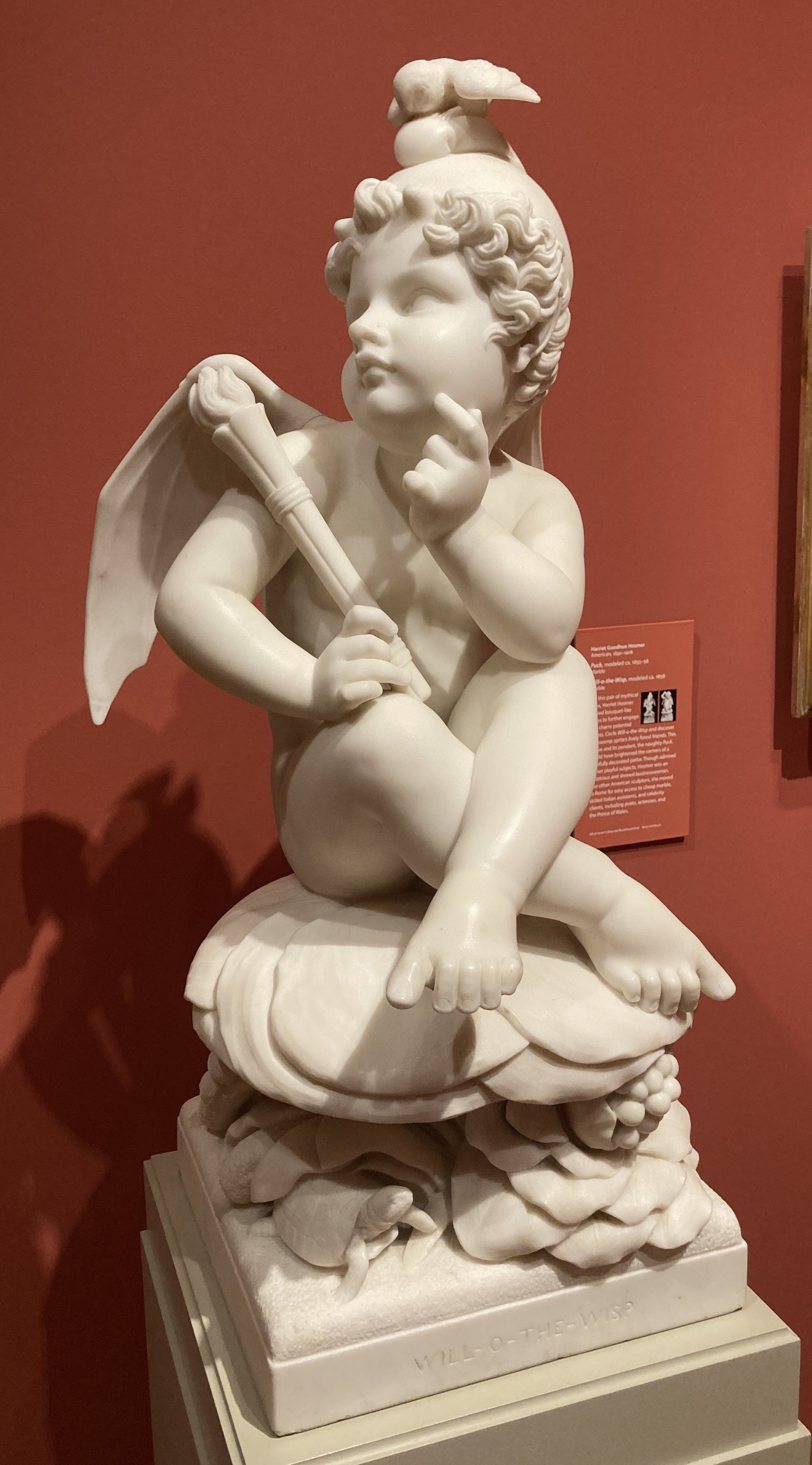
Sculpture of a will-o'-the-wisp by Harriet Hosmer

In the original British tales, protagonists named either Will or Jack are doomed to haunt the marshes with a light for some misdeed. One version from Shropshire is recounted by Briggs in A Dictionary of Fairies and refers to Will the Smith. Will is a wicked blacksmith who is given a second chance by Saint Peter at the gates of heaven, but leads such a bad life that he ends up being doomed to wander the earth. The Devil provides him with a single burning coal with which to warm himself, which he then uses to lure foolish travellers into the marshes.

An Irish version of the tale has a ne'er-do-well named Drunk Jack or Stingy Jack who, when the Devil comes to collect his soul, tricks him into turning into a coin, so he can pay for his one last drink. When the Devil obliges, Jack places him in his pocket next to a crucifix, preventing him from returning to his original form. In exchange for his freedom, the Devil grants Jack ten more years of life. When the term expires, the Devil comes to collect his due. But Jack tricks him again by making him climb a tree and then carving a cross underneath, preventing him from climbing down. In exchange for removing the cross, the Devil forgives Jack's debt. However, no one as bad as Jack would ever be allowed into heaven, so Jack is forced upon his death to travel to hell and ask for a place there. The Devil denies him entrance in revenge but grants him an ember from the fires of hell to light his way through the twilight world to which lost souls are forever condemned. Jack places it in a carved turnip to serve as a lantern. Another version of the tale is "Willy the Whisp", related in Irish Folktales by Henry Glassie. Séadna by Peadar Ua Laoghaire is yet another version—and also the first modern novel in the Irish language.

In Welsh folklore, it is said that the light is "fairy fire" held in the hand of a púca, or pwca, a small goblin-like fairy that mischievously leads lone travellers off the beaten path at night. As the traveller follows the púca through the marsh or bog, the fire is extinguished, leaving them lost. The púca is said to be one of the Tylwyth Teg, or fairy family. In Wales the light predicts a funeral that will take place soon in the locality. Wirt Sikes in his book British Goblins mentions the following Welsh tale about púca.

A peasant travelling home at dusk sees a bright light travelling along ahead of him. Looking closer, he sees that the light is a lantern held by a "dusky little figure", which he follows for several miles. All of a sudden he finds himself standing on the edge of a vast chasm with a roaring torrent of water rushing below him. At that precise moment the lantern-carrier leaps across the gap, lifts the light high over its head, lets out a malicious laugh and blows out the light, leaving the poor peasant a long way from home, standing in pitch darkness at the edge of a precipice. This is a fairly common cautionary tale concerning the phenomenon; however, the ignis fatuus was not always considered dangerous. Some tales present the will-o'-the-wisp as a treasure-guardian, leading those brave enough to follow it to certain riches—a form of behaviour sometimes ascribed also to the Irish leprechaun. Other stories tell of travellers surprising a will-o'-the-wisp while lost in the woods and being either guided out or led further astray, depending on whether they treated the spirit kindly or harshly.

Also related, the pixy-light from Devon and Cornwall which leads travellers away from the safe and reliable route and into the bogs with glowing lights. "Like Poltergeist they can generate uncanny sounds. They were less serious than their German Weiße Frauen kin, frequently blowing out candles on unsuspecting courting couples or producing obscene kissing sounds, which were always misinterpreted by parents." Pixy-Light was also associated with "lambent light" which the Old Norse might have seen guarding their tombs. In Cornish folklore, Pixy-Light also has associations with the Colt pixie. "A colt pixie is a pixie that has taken the shape of a horse and enjoys playing tricks such as neighing at the other horses to lead them astray". In Guernsey, the light is known as the faeu boulanger (rolling fire), and is believed to be a lost soul. On being confronted with the spectre, tradition prescribes two remedies. The first is to turn one's cap or coat inside out. This has the effect of stopping the faeu boulanger in its tracks. The other solution is to stick a knife into the ground, blade up. The faeu, in an attempt to kill itself, will attack the blade.

The will-o'-the-wisp was also known as the Spunkie in the Scottish Highlands where it would take the form of a linkboy (a boy who carried a flaming torch to light the way for pedestrians in exchange for a fee), or else simply a light that always seemed to recede, in order to lead unwary travellers to their doom. The spunkie has also been blamed for shipwrecks at night after being spotted on land and mistaken for a harbour light. Other tales of Scottish folklore regard these mysterious lights as omens of death or the ghosts of once living human beings. They often appeared over lochs or on roads along which funeral processions were known to travel. A strange light sometimes seen in the Hebrides is referred to as the teine sith, or "fairy light", though there was no formal connection between it and the fairy race.

==== Ireland ====
In the late 1930s, schoolchildren across Ireland were tasked with the interviewing of older neighbours and relatives with regards to collecting local history and folklore as part of the Irish Folklore Commission's Schools' Collection. Numerous sightings of the phenomenon were recorded as part of the project. One such child, James Curran, relayed information taken from his father about a sighting in Harristown, County Kildare:

My father told me that when he was about fourteen years of age, he was crossing the limekiln of Harristown and he saw a little red ball of fire rolling along in front of him. He ran after it, but he could not catch it as when he would run it would roll quicker, and quicker, and when he would stop, it would stop. He followed it, all through Clarke's bottoms, across Major Mc Gees land and on to the railway and then it disappeared. He did not know what it was, but his father told him it was Will o' the Wisp.

=== Oceania ===
The Australian equivalent, known as the Min Min light is reportedly seen in parts of the outback after dark. The majority of sightings are reported to have occurred in the Channel Country region.

Stories about the lights can be found in aboriginal myth pre-dating western settlement of the region and have since become part of wider Australian folklore. Indigenous Australians hold that the number of sightings has increased alongside the increasing ingression of Europeans into the region. According to folklore, the lights sometimes followed or approached people and have disappeared when fired upon, only to reappear later on.

== Scientific explanations ==
Scientists propose that will-o'-the-wisp phenomena (ignis fatuus) are caused by the oxidation of phosphine (PH_{3}), diphosphane (P_{2}H_{4}), and methane (CH_{4}). These compounds, produced by organic decay, can cause photon emissions. Since phosphine and diphosphane mixtures spontaneously ignite on contact with the oxygen in air, only small quantities of it would be needed to ignite the much more abundant methane to create ephemeral fires. Furthermore, phosphine produces phosphorus pentoxide as a by-product, which forms phosphoric acid upon contact with water vapor, which can explain "viscous moisture" sometimes described as accompanying ignis fatuus.

=== Historical explanations ===
The idea of the will-o'-the-wisp phenomena being caused by natural gases can be found as early as 1596, as mentioned in the works of Ludwig Lavater. (Note: "That many naturall things are taken to be ghoasts": "Many times candles & small fires appeare in the night, and seeme to runne up and downe... Sometime these fires goe alone in the night season, and put such as see them, as they travel by night, in great feare. But these things, and many such lyke have their naturall causes... Natural Philosophers write, that thicke exhilations aryse out of the earth, and are kindled. Mynes full of sulphur and brimstone, if the aire enter unto it, as it lyeth in the holes and veines of the earth, will kindle on fier, and strive to get out." From Of Ghostes and Spirites, Walking by Night, And of Straunge Noyses, Crackes, and Sundrie forewarnings, which commonly happen before the death of men: Great Slaughters, and alterations of Kingdomes.) In 1776 Alessandro Volta first proposed that natural electrical phenomena (like lightning) interacting with methane marsh gas may be the cause of ignis fatuus. This was supported by the British polymath Joseph Priestley in his series of works Experiments and Observations on Different Kinds of Air (1772–1790); and by the French physicist Pierre Bertholon de Saint-Lazare in De l'électricité des météores (1787).

Early critics of the marsh gas hypothesis often dismissed it on various grounds including the unlikeliness of spontaneous combustion, the absence of warmth in some observed ignis fatuus, the odd behavior of ignis fatuus receding upon being approached, and the differing accounts of ball lightning (which was also classified as a kind of ignis fatuus). An example of such criticism is found in Folk-Lore from Buffalo Valley (1891) by the American anthropologist John G. Owens. (Note: "This is a name that is sometimes applied to a phenomenon perhaps more frequently called Jack-o'-the-Lantern, or Will-o'-the-Wisp. It seems to be a ball of fire, varying in size from that of a candle-flame to that of a man's head. It is generally observed in damp, marshy places, moving to and fro; but it has been known to stand perfectly still and send off scintillations. As you approach it, it will move on, keeping just beyond your reach; if you retire, it will follow you. That these fireballs do occur, and that they will repeat your motion, seems to be established, but no satisfactory explanation has yet been offered that I have heard. Those who are less superstitious say that it is the ignition of the gases rising from the marsh. But how a light produced from burning gas could have the form described and move as described, advancing as you advance, receding as you recede, and at other times remaining stationary, without having any visible connection with the earth, is not clear to me".)

The apparent retreat of ignis fatuus upon being approached might be explained simply by the agitation of the air by nearby moving objects, causing the gases to disperse. This was observed in the very detailed accounts of several close interactions with ignis fatuus published earlier in 1832 by Major Louis Blesson after a series of experiments in various localities where they were known to occur. Of note is his first encounter with ignis fatuus in a marshland between a deep valley in the forest of Gorbitz, Newmark, Germany. Blesson observed that the water was covered by an iridescent film, and during day-time, bubbles could be observed rising abundantly from certain areas. At night, Blesson observed bluish-purple flames in the same areas and concluded that it was connected to the rising gas. He spent several days investigating the phenomenon, finding to his dismay that the flames retreated every time he tried to approach them. He eventually succeeded and was able to confirm that the lights were indeed caused by ignited gas. The British scientist Charles Tomlinson in On Certain Low-Lying Meteors (1893) described Blesson's experiments. (Note: "On visiting the spot at night, the sensitive flames retired as the major advanced; but on standing quite still, they returned, and he tried to light a piece of paper at them, but the current of air produced by his breath kept them at too great a distance. On turning away his head, and screening his breath, he succeeded in setting fire to the paper. He was also able to extinguish the flame by driving it before him to a part of the ground where no gas was produced; then applying a flame to the place whence the gas issued, a kind of explosion was heard over eight or nine square feet of the marsh; a red light was seen, which faded to a blue flame about three feet high and this continued to burn with an unsteady motion. As the morning dawned the flames became pale and they seemed to approach nearer and nearer to the earth, until at last they faded from sight".)

Blesson also observed differences in the colour and heat of the flames in different marshes. The ignis fatuus in Malapane, Upper Silesia (now Ozimek, Poland) could be ignited and extinguished, but were unable to burn pieces of paper or wood shavings. Similarly, the ignis fatuus in another forest in Poland coated pieces of paper and wood shavings with an oily viscous fluid instead of burning them. Blesson also accidentally created ignis fatuus in the marshes of Porta Westfalica, Germany, while launching fireworks.

==== 20th century ====
A description of 'the will-o'-the wisp' appeared in a 1936 UK publication of The Scout's Book of Gadgets and Dodges, where the author (Sam F. Braham), describes it as follows:

'This is an uncertain light which may sometimes be seen dancing over churchyards and marshy places. None really knows how it is produced, and chemists are continually experimenting to discover its nature. It is thought that it is formed by the mixing of marsh gas, which is giving off decaying vegetable matter, with phosphoretted hydrogen, a gas which ignites instantly. But this theory has not been definitely proved.'

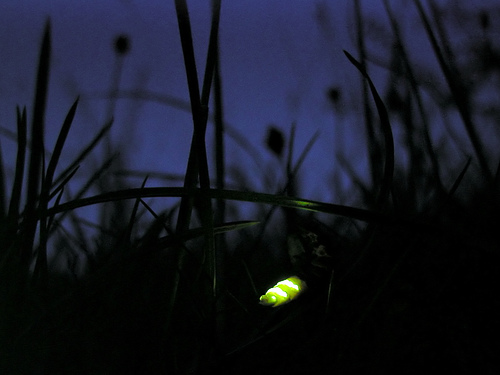
Glowing firefly (Lampyris noctiluca)

One attempt to replicate ignis fatuus under laboratory conditions was in 1980 by British geologist Alan A. Mills of Leicester University. Though he did succeed in creating a cool glowing cloud by mixing crude phosphine and natural gas, the color of the light was green and it produced copious amounts of acrid smoke. This was contrary to most eyewitness accounts of ignis fatuus. As an alternative, Mills proposed in 2000 that ignis fatuus may instead be cold flames. These are luminescent pre-combustion halos that occur when various compounds are heated to just below ignition point. Cold flames are indeed typically bluish in color and as their name suggests, they generate very little heat. Cold flames occur in a wide variety of compounds, including hydrocarbons (including methane), alcohols, aldehydes, oils, acids, and even waxes. However, it is unknown if cold flames occur naturally, though a lot of compounds which exhibit cold flames are the natural byproducts of organic decay.

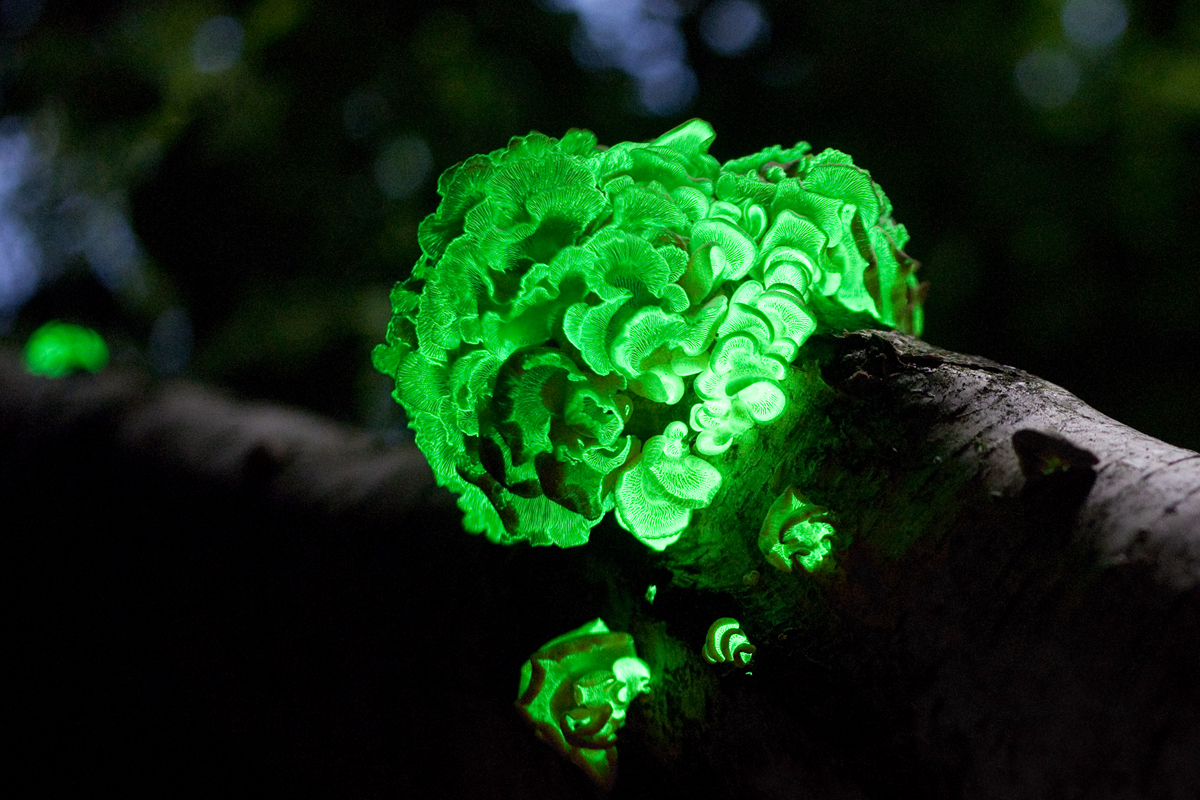
Panellus stipticus, Mt. Vernon, Wisconsin (long exposure)

A related hypothesis involves the natural chemiluminescence of phosphine. In 2008 the Italian chemists Luigi Garlaschelli and Paolo Boschetti attempted to recreate Mills' experiments. They successfully created a faint cool light by mixing phosphine with air and nitrogen. Though the glow was still greenish in colour, Garlaschelli and Boschetti noted that under low-light conditions, the human eye cannot easily distinguish between colours. Furthermore, by adjusting the concentrations of the gases and the environmental conditions (temperature, humidity, etc.), it was possible to eliminate the smoke and smell, or at least render it to undetectable levels. Garlaschelli and Boschetti also agreed with Mills that cold flames may also be a plausible explanation for other instances of ignis fatuus.

In 1993 professors Derr and Persinger proposed that some ignis fatuus may be geologic in origin, piezoelectrically generated under tectonic strain. The strains that move faults would also heat up the rocks, vaporizing the water in them. Rock or soil containing something piezoelectric, like quartz, silicon, or arsenic, may also produce electricity, channelled up to the surface through the soil via a column of vaporized water, there somehow appearing as earth lights. This would explain why the lights appear electrical, erratic, or even intelligent in their behaviour.

The will-o'-the-wisp phenomena may occur due to the bioluminescence of various forest dwelling micro-organisms and insects. The eerie glow emitted from certain fungal species, such as the honey fungus, during chemical reactions to form white rot could be mistaken for the mysterious will-o'-the-wisp or foxfire lights. There are many other bioluminescent organisms that could create the illusions of fairy lights, such as fireflies. Light reflecting off larger forest dwelling creatures could explain the phenomenon of will-o'-the-wisp moving and reacting to other lights. The white plumage of barn owls may reflect enough light from the Moon to appear as a will-o'-the-wisp; hence the possibility of the lights moving, reacting to other lights, etc.

Ignis fatuus sightings are rarely reported today. The decline is believed to be the result of the draining and reclamation of swamplands in recent centuries, such as the formerly vast fenlands of eastern England which have now been converted to farmlands.

Recent research has proposed a novel mechanism for the ignition of will-o'-the-wisps. Scientists have demonstrated that spontaneous electrical discharges, termed "microlightning", can occur between rising methane-containing microbubbles in water. These discharges, arising from strong electric fields at gas-liquid interfaces, initiate nonthermal oxidation of methane, producing luminescence and measurable heat. This finding offers a scientific basis for ignis fatuus by providing a previously unknown ignition mechanism for the marsh gas hypothesis, without requiring external ignition sources.

== Literature and popular culture ==
- Two will-o'-the-wisps feature as characters in Goethe's short story "The Green Snake and the Beautiful Lily."
- In Jules Verne's The Child of the Cavern (1877), mysterious lights known as the "Fire-Maidens" appear throughout the novel, particularly in the chapter of the same name. Some characters believe them to be supernatural beings from Scottish folklore, while others insist that the lights have a natural, scientific explanation, contrasting folklore with rational inquiry.
- A character based on will-o'-the-wisps features in Animal Crossing: New Horizons.
- In the 2012 movie Brave, Merida encounters will-o'-the-wisps, or simply "the wisps", at a young age. Following them leads her to the bear, Mor'du, who attacks the family. Years later, she sees them in the forest and follows their path to the witch's hut, where she gets a spell to change her fate.

== Global terms ==
=== Americas ===
Canada

- Fireship of Baie des Chaleurs in New Brunswick

United States

- Arbyrd / Senath Light of Missouri
- Bragg Road ghost light (Light of Saratoga) of Texas
- Brown Mountain Lights of North Carolina
- Devil's Torchlight or Devil's Lantern in the Southern United States and Deep South
- Gurdon light of Arkansas
- Hornet ghost light (The Spooklight) of Missouri-Oklahoma state line
- Maco light of North Carolina
- Swamp lights of Louisiana
- Marfa lights of Texas
- Paulding Light of Michigan's Upper Peninsula
- Cohoke Light of eastern Virginia's Cohoke Swamp wetlands

Argentina and Uruguay

- Luz Mala

=== Asia ===
- Chir batti in Gujarat
- Naga fireballs on the Mekong in Thailand
- Aleya in Bengal
- Dhon guloi in Assam
- Abu Fanous in the Middle East
- Andaru in Indonesia (though sometimes refers to meteors or comets as well)

=== Europe ===
- Hessdalen light, Norway
- Irrbloss, Sweden
- Lyktgubbe, Sweden
- Martebo lights, Sweden
- Virvatuli, Finland
- Lidércfény, Hungary
- Ballybar, near Carlow, Ireland
- Dwaallichtjes in the Netherlands and Belgium
- Sheeries, Ireland
- Liam na lasóige, Ireland
- Fuego fatuo, Spain
- Fuoco fatuo, Italy
- Irrlicht, Germany
- Bludička or svetlonos, Slovakia
- Žaltvykslės, Lithuania
- Błędny ognik, Poland
- Zwodziasz or zwodzijos, Poland

=== Oceania ===
- Min Min light of the Outback Australia

== See also ==
- Chir Batti – Ghost light reported in the Banni grasslands, Kutch district, Gujarat State, India
- Corpse road – Road historically used to transport corpses to cemeteries
- Feuermann (ghost) – Fiery ghost from German folklore
- Foo fighter – UFOs reported in the 1940s
- Hessdalen Lights – Unidentified phenomenon at Hessdalen valley in Norway
- Kitsunebi – Atmospheric ghost lights in Japanese folklore
- Lantern man – Paranormal creature in England
- Lidérc – Unique supernatural being of Hungarian folklore
- Mãe-do-Ouro – Brazilian mythological figure
- Omphalotus olearius – Species of fungus
- Santelmo – Creature of Philippine mythology
- Shiranui – Atmospheric ghost light
- Simonside Dwarfs – Race of dwarfs in English folklore
- St. Elmo's fire – Luminous plasma created in an electric field
- Willo the Wisp – A British television show from 1981 and remade in 2005
- Yan-gant-y-tan – Demon from Brittany, France
