= Mãe-do-Ouro =

Brazilian mythological figure

Stained glass in the Santos Coffee Stock depicting bandeirante Bartolomeu Bueno da Silva, known as Anhanguera, finding the Mãe-do-Ouro (in the center) accompanied by the Mães d'Água

The Mãe-do-Ouro (lit. 'Mother of Gold') is a Brazilian mythological figure primarily known in the folklore of the interior of the Brazilian Southeast, Northeast, and Center-West regions. Depending on the region, this figure takes the form of either a beautiful blonde woman that wears a silk dress or a fireball that has the ability to transform itself into the former. Her appearance is said to indicate areas where gold and precious minerals should not be exploited.

== History ==
The origins of the Mãe-do-Ouro date to the 18th century Brazilian Gold Rush.

== See also ==
- Ball lightning
- Brown Mountain Lights
- Hitodama
- Marfa lights
- Will-o'-the-wisp
