= The Spooklight =

Ghost light reported in Missouri and Oklahoma, United States

Coordinates: 36°56′38.18″N 94°38′34.80″W

The Spooklight (also called the Hornet Spooklight, Hollis Light and Joplin Spook Light) is an atmospheric ghost light on the border between southwestern Missouri and northeastern Oklahoma, a few miles west of the small town of Hornet, Missouri. It is caused by the misidentification of distant car headlights.

== Origin and history ==
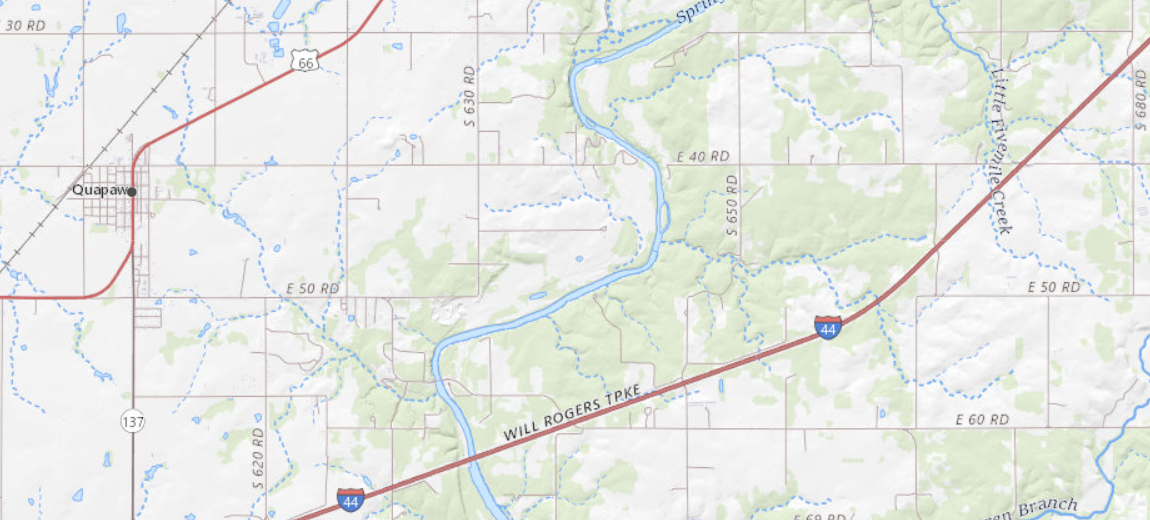
Excerpt from a screenshot of USGS National Map Viewer, showing the alignment of E 50 and Route 66

An east to west stretch of Route 66, south of Quapaw, Oklahoma, is in alignment with a farm road called E 50, colloquially known as "Spooklight Road", about ten miles (16 km) east of it, on the other side of Spring River. Due to this alignment, headlights of cars driving east on Route 66 are unexpectedly visible in the distance from higher elevation points along E 50; this is the cause of the Spooklight. The first to recognize this in print was AB MacDonald in a January 1936 issue of the Kansas City Star. This has been demonstrated repeatedly by experiments in which fireworks, spot lights, and flashing car headlights along Route 66 have been seen by observers posted on Spooklight Road. Some instances of these staged experiments were in 1946 by Thomas Sheard, in 1955 by a group from Kansas City, by Robert Gannon in 1965, and by Allen Rice and his "Boomers" sleuths in 2015.

As with most other supposed ghost lights, storytellers have created mythologies about the Spooklight to purport that it existed before cars but none of these claims can be verified by any printed sources. Thorough research by journalist Paul W. Johns found that there are no records of any mention of the Spooklight in print until after 1926, which is the year that that section of Route 66 was designated.

In the 1960s, there was a Spooklight museum at the eastern end of E 50. In the Popular Mechanics article, Gannon called it a "tourist trap that doesn't quite make it". It had a three-inch (76 mm) telescope that allowed people to view the light for 25 cents, but the owners had set it up indoors to look through a half inch hole in the wall, which stopped down the aperture so much it couldn't resolve anything. According to the proprietor, this was done to protect it from the rain. Gannon brought with him a comparable telescope, and said that, although the naked eye perceived one light, his telescope plainly split the Spooklight into car headlights that always came in pairs.

Belief in the supposed mystery of the Spooklight has for generations been promoted by local businesses and chambers of commerce who embrace it as an opportunity for tourism revenue. In 1969, the Missouri Chamber of Commerce ran a press release in many newspapers that included the false statement, "Scientists, however, using various technical devices, have not been successful in determining a theory as to the origin of the light." The Joplin Chamber of Commerce published a visitor guidebook, The Tri-State Spook Light, in 1955, and the Neosho Chamber of Commerce published its own tourist booklet in 1963. In the 1950s, the Missouri Division of the U.S. Brewers Foundation ran newspaper ads promoting the Spooklight, suggesting that they thought it would lead to increased beer sales to tourists.

== Mythology ==
Numerous legends exist explaining the origin of the Spooklight:

- Ghosts of two young Native American lovers looking for each other
- Ghost of a murdered Osage chief
- "Spirit of a Quapaw maiden who drowned herself in the river when her warrior was killed in battle"
- Lantern of the ghost of a miner searching for his children stolen by the Indians

In the online lore about the Spooklight, it's often repeated that someone, possibly named Foster Young, published some kind of manuscript entitled The Ozark Spook Light sometime in the 1880s; this is asserted as a rebuttal to the distant headlight explanation, but no evidence has been produced that either the document or the claimed author ever existed.

== See also ==
- Mater and the Ghostlight, a short included with Cars (2006 computer-animated film), which references this legend
- Will-o'-the-wisp
- Marfa Lights
- Min Min Lights
- St. Louis Light
- Light of Saratoga
- Longdendale lights

== Bibliography ==
- Vance Randolph, Ozark Magic and Folklore, 1947 (Dover, 2003, ISBN 978-0486211817)
- Robert Gannon, "Balls O'Fire – PM Tracks Down Ozark Spooklight", in Popular Mechanics, September 1965, p. 116
