= Abu Fanous =

Light phenomenon in the Arabian desert

Abu Fanous أبو فانوس (Arabic)
- Abu Fanous at dawn

Creature information
- Other name(s): Abu Siraj, Abu Nuwaira
- Grouping: Jinn
- Sub grouping: Ghoul
- Similar entities: Min Min light, Marfa lights, Banaspati
- Folklore: Arabic and Islamic

Origin
- First attested: Pre-Islamic times
- Known for: Luring travellers into the desert, then vanishing without a trace, leaving them lost
- Country: Saudi Arabia, Iraq, Kuwait, Bahrain, Qatar, UAE, Oman, Yemen, Iran, Lebanon
- Region: Arabian Peninsula, Persian Gulf
- Habitat: Arabian desert

Abu Fanous (Arabic: أبو فانوس) is a mysterious light phenomenon observed by travellers in the Arabian desert, mainly the Eastern Province, Riyadh, Najd, Rub' al-Khali and the Gulf. It appears at dawn or during the night as an orb or headlight that moves unpredictably and lures people into the desert, then vanishes without a trace.

== Etymology ==
The literal meaning of Abu Fanous is Father of the fanous, with fanous (فانوس) meaning lantern or light. Other names are also Abu Siraj (أبو سراج) or Abu Nuwaira (أبو نويرة).

== Folklore ==
In local Arabic folklore, Abu Fanous is described as a jinn, an Islamic and Arabic supernatural being, that lures people into remote areas of the desert and then disappears, leaving the travellers to get lost and die. According to oral accounts, travellers are advised to not at all approach the light and instead recite Ayat ul-Kursi or the Adhan to get away from it, based on a hadith of the prophet Muhammad from Jabir ibn Abdullah about ghilan.

== Popular culture ==
The phenomenon was depicted as a painting in 2023 by Saudi artist Aziz Jamal, conveying its effect by using eyes appearing in the darkness.

== Reported sightings ==
There have always been sightings of Abu Fanous and cases of travelers getting lost in the Arabian desert, such as one traveller being pursued by it in his car, until reaching the city of Qaisumah, after which the light disappeared. No clear scientific explanation has yet been gathered for this phenomenon, while there are theories such as natural gases escaping from the Earth's crust and igniting upon contact with air, creating a glowing light.

== See also ==
- Min Min light
- Ghoul
- Marfa lights
- Folklore
- Unidentified flying object
- Ball lightning
