= Lantern man =

Paranormal creature in England

A lantern man is an atmospheric ghost light described in the folklore of The Fens of East Anglia, with sightings around Wicken Fen and other areas. According to the stories, first collected by folklorist L.F. Newman, the lights are believed to be evil spirits who attempt to draw victims to their death in the reed beds. Newman writes that the spirits are attracted by the sound of whistling, and that a way to evade them is to lie face down on the ground with your mouth in the mud. The phenomenon, which seems to be a variation of will-o'-the-wisp folklore, is now dismissed as sightings of combustible marsh gas.

== Encounters ==
A local fisherman recounted to parapsychologist Peter Underwood how he had once thrown himself to the floor to escape the attention of a lantern man which had been drawn to his whistling.

Another local man recounted how he had attracted the attention of a lantern man while whistling to his dog while walking on the fen. The man had taken shelter at the home of a friend, who hung out a horn on a long pole to distract the spirit. The following morning the horn was found to have been burnt up.
