= St. Elmo's fire =

Luminous plasma created in an electric field

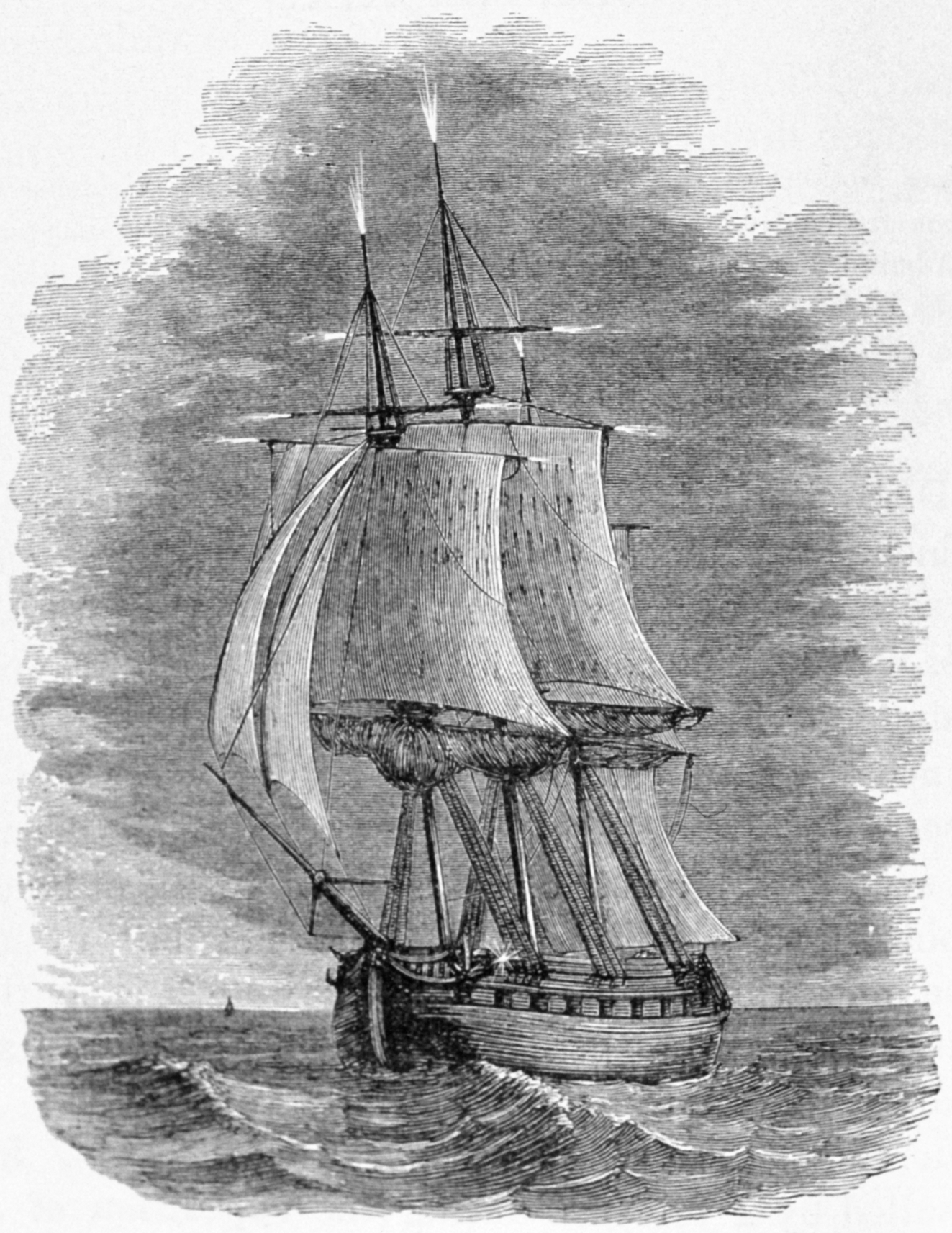
Illustration of St. Elmo's fire on a ship at sea

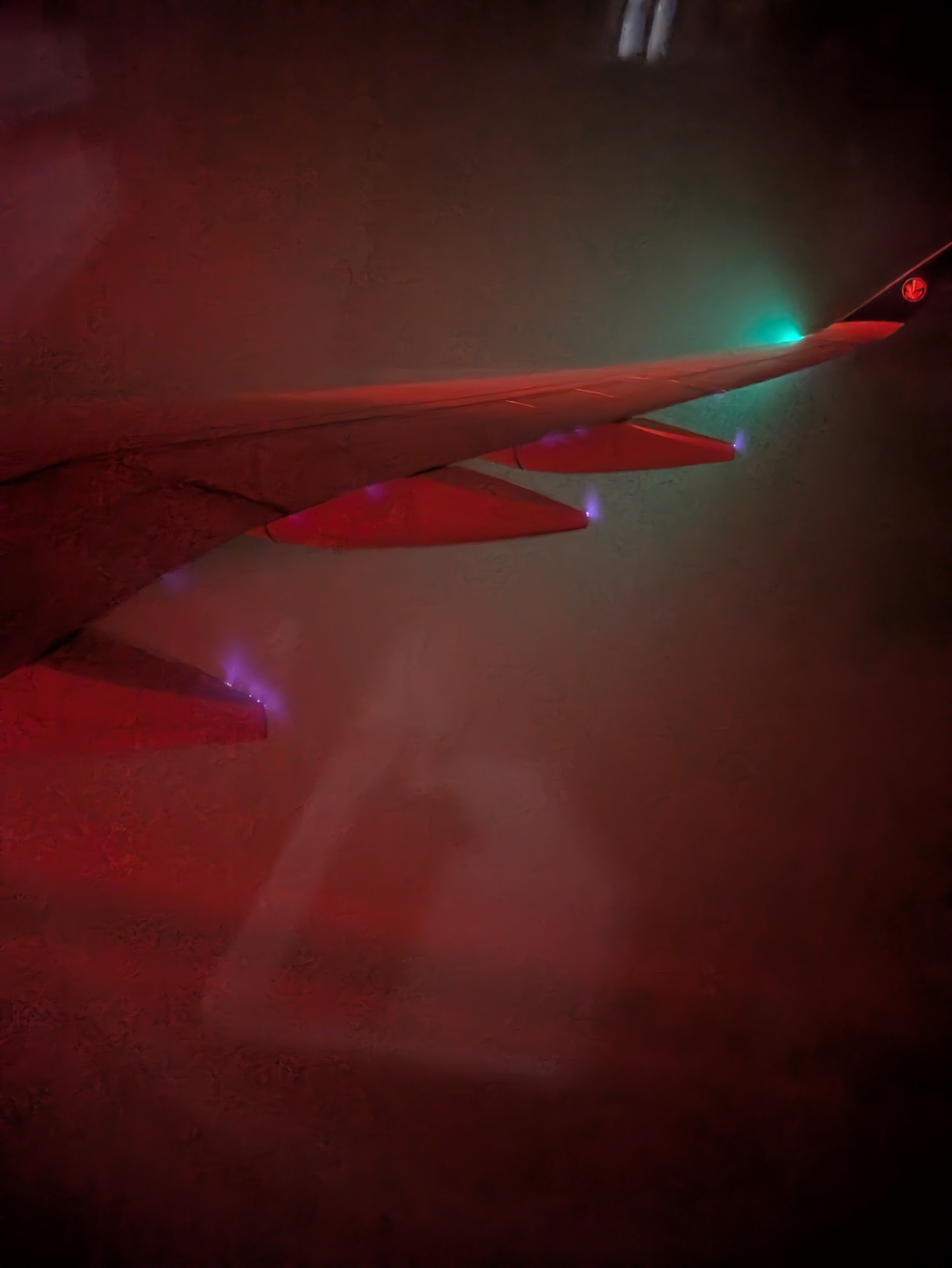
St. Elmo's fire on the flaps and flap track fairings of an A350 while going through a cumulonimbus cloud

St. Elmo's fire (also called corposant, Hermes fire, furole, witchfire or witch's fire) is a weather phenomenon in which luminous plasma is created by a corona discharge from a rod-like object such as a mast, spire, chimney, or animal horn in an atmospheric electric field. It has also been observed on the leading edges and windshields of aircraft by pilots.

The intensity of the effect, a blue or violet glow around the object, often accompanied by a hissing or buzzing sound, is proportional to the strength of the electric field and therefore noticeable primarily during thunderstorms or volcanic eruptions.

St. Elmo's fire is named after St. Erasmus of Formia (also known as St. Elmo), the patron saint of sailors. The phenomenon, which can warn of an imminent lightning strike, was regarded by sailors with awe and sometimes considered to be a good omen.

== Cause ==
St. Elmo's fire is a reproducible and demonstrable form of plasma. The electric field around the affected object causes ionization of the air molecules, producing a faint glow easily visible in low-light conditions. Conditions that can generate St. Elmo's fire are present during thunderstorms, when high-voltage differentials are present between clouds and the ground underneath. A local electric field of about 100 kV/m is required to begin an electric discharge in moist air. The magnitude of the electric field depends greatly on the geometry (shape and size) of the object. Sharp points lower the necessary voltage because electric fields are more concentrated in areas of high curvature, so discharges preferentially occur and are more intense at the ends of pointed objects.

The nitrogen and oxygen in the Earth's atmosphere cause St. Elmo's fire to emit blue or violet light via the same kind of mechanism that causes clear neon gas-discharge lamps to glow (without phosphors), albeit with a different colour due to the different gases involved.

In 1751, Benjamin Franklin hypothesized that a pointed iron rod would light up at the tip during a lightning storm, similar in appearance to St. Elmo's fire.

In an August 2020 paper, researchers in MIT's Department of Aeronautics and Astronautics demonstrated that St. Elmo's fire behaves differently in airborne objects versus grounded structures. They show that electrically isolated structures accumulate charge more effectively in high wind, in contrast to the corona discharge observed in grounded structures.

== Research ==
=== Vacuum ultraviolet light ===
Researchers at Rutgers University have devised a method to generate vacuum ultraviolet light (light with wavelength shorter than 200 nm, overlapping the UVC range, and absorbed by oxygen) using different forms of lighting, by employing sharp conductive needles placed within a dense gas, such as xenon, contained in a cell. They achieve this by applying a high negative voltage to the needles in the xenon-filled cell, resulting in the efficient production of vacuum ultraviolet light. St. Elmo's Fire being similar, they believe it could be used as lighting but with a higher power source, thus increasing efficiency by over 50%.

== In history and culture ==
- In ancient Greece, the appearance of a single instance of St. Elmo's fire was called Helene (Ancient Greek: Ἑλένη), literally meaning "torch", (Note: The term was also used for a special wicker basket used at the cult of Artemis at Brauron in Attica.) with two instances referred to as Castor and Pollux, names of the mythological twin brothers of Helen. (Note: Known as 'Castor and Pollux' in Latin; Homeric Hymn 33 describes a generic epiphany of these fraternal heroes, collectively called the Dioskouroi, in the midst of a storm at sea. Here they are said to rush through the air "with tawny wings" and to bring relief to terrified mariners.)
- After the medieval period, St. Elmo's fire was sometimes associated with the Greek element of fire, such as with one of Paracelsus's elementals, specifically the salamander, or, alternatively, with a similar creature referred to as an acthnici.
- Welsh mariners referred to St. Elmo's fire as canwyll yr ysbryd or canwyll yr ysbryd glân ("candles of the Holy Ghost" or the "candles of St. David").
- Russian sailors also historically documented instances of St. Elmo's fire, known as "Saint Nicholas" or "Saint Peter's lights", also sometimes called St. Helen's or St. Hermes' fire, perhaps through linguistic confusion.
- St. Elmo's fire is reported to have been seen during the Siege of Constantinople by the Ottoman Empire in 1453. It was reportedly seen emitting from the top of the Hippodrome. The Byzantines attributed it to a sign that the Christian God would soon come and destroy the conquering Muslim army. According to George Sphrantzes, it disappeared just days before Constantinople fell, ending the Byzantine Empire.
- Accounts of Magellan's first circumnavigation of the globe refer to St. Elmo's fire (calling it the body of St. Anselm) being seen around the fleet's ships multiple times off the coast of South America. The sailors saw these as favourable omens.
- En route to Nagasaki with the Fat Man atom bomb on 9 August 1945, the B-29 Bockscar experienced an uncanny luminous blue plasma forming around the spinning propellers, "as though we were riding the whirlwind through space on a chariot of blue fire."
- St Elmo's fire was seen during the 1955 Great Plains tornado outbreak in Kansas and Oklahoma.
- Among the phenomena experienced on British Airways Flight 9 on 24 June 1982, were glowing light flashes along the leading edges of the aircraft, including the wings and cockpit windscreen, which were seen by both passengers and crew. While the bright flashes of light shared similarities with St Elmo's fire, the glow experienced was from the impact of ash particles on the leading edges of the aircraft, similar to that seen by operators of sandblasting equipment.
- St. Elmo's fire was observed and its optical spectrum recorded during a University of Alaska research flight over the Amazon in 1995 to study sprites.
- Ill-fated Air France Flight 447 from Rio de Janeiro–Galeão International Airport to Paris Charles de Gaulle Airport in 2009 is understood to have experienced St. Elmo's fire 23 minutes prior to crashing into the Atlantic Ocean; however, the phenomenon was not a factor in the disaster.
- Apoy ni San Elmo – commonly shortened to santelmo – is a bad omen or a flying spirit in Filipino folklore, although the description for santelmo is more similar to ball lightning than St. Elmo's fire. There are various indigenous names for santelmo which has existed before the term santelmo was coined. The term santelmo originated from Spanish colonial rule in the Philippines.

== Notable observations ==
=== Classical texts ===
St. Elmo's fire is referenced in the works of Julius Caesar (De Bello Africo, 47) and Pliny the Elder (Naturalis Historia, book 2, par. 101), Alcaeus frag. 34. Earlier, Xenophanes of Colophon had alluded to the phenomenon.

=== Zheng He ===
In 15th-century Ming China, Admiral Zheng He and his associates composed the Liujiagang and Changle inscriptions, the two epitaphs of the Ming treasure voyages, where they made a reference to St. Elmo's fire as a divine omen of Tianfei, the goddess of sailors and seafarers.

The power of the goddess, having indeed been manifested in previous times, has been abundantly revealed in the present generation. In the midst of the rushing waters it happened that, when there was a hurricane, suddenly a divine lantern was seen shining at the masthead, and as soon as that miraculous light appeared the danger was appeased, so that even in the peril of capsizing one felt reassured and that there was no cause for fear.

— Admiral Zheng He and his associates (Changle inscription)

=== Accounts associated with Magellan and da Gama ===
Mention of St. Elmo's fire can be found in Antonio Pigafetta's journal of his 1519 to 1522 voyage with Ferdinand Magellan. St. Elmo's fire, also known as "corposants" or "corpusants" from the Portuguese corpo santo ("holy body"), is also described in The Lusiads (1572), the epic account of the voyages of discovery of Vasco da Gama (1469-1524).

=== Robert Burton ===
Robert Burton wrote of St. Elmo's fire in his Anatomy of Melancholy (1621): "Radzivilius, the Polonian duke, calls this apparition Sancti Germani sidus; and saith moreover that he saw the same after in a storm, as he was sailing, 1582, from Alexandria to Rhodes". This refers to the voyage made by the Polish-Lithuanian nobleman Mikołaj Krzysztof "the Orphan" Radziwiłł in 1582–1584.

=== John Davis ===
On 9 May 1605, while on the second voyage of John Davis commanded by Sir Edward Michelborne to the East Indies, an unknown writer aboard the Tiger describes the phenomenon: "In the extremity of our storm appeared to us in the night, upon our maine Top-mast head, a flame about the bigness of a great Candle, which the Portugals call Corpo Sancto, holding it a most divine token that when it appeareth the worst is past. As, thanked be God, we had better weather after it".

=== Pierre Testu-Brissy ===
Pierre Testu-Brissy was a pioneering French balloonist. On 18 June 1786, he flew for 11 hours and made the first electrical observations as he ascended into thunderclouds. He stated that he drew remarkable discharges from the clouds by means of an iron rod carried in the basket. He also experienced Saint Elmo's fire.

=== William Bligh ===
William Bligh recorded in his log on Sunday 4 May 1788, on board HMS Bounty of 'Mutiny On The Bounty' fame: 'Corpo-Sant. Some electrical Vapour seen about the Iron at the Yard Arms about the Size of the blaze of a Candle.' The location of this event was in the South Atlantic sailing from Cape Horn, (having failed to round the cape in the winter months), en route to Cape of Good Hope and west of Tristan da Cunha. The log records the ship's location as: Latd. 42°:34'S, Longd (by the time keeper K2) as 34°:38'W. Reference: Log of the Proceedings of His Majestys Ship Bounty in a Voyage to the South Seas, (to take the Breadfruit plant from the Society Islands to the West Indies,) under the Command of Lieutenant William Bligh, 1 December 1787 – 22 October 1788 Safe 1/46, Mitchell Library, State Library of NSW

=== William Noah ===
William Noah, a silversmith convicted in London of stealing 2,000 pounds of lead, while en route to Sydney, New South Wales on the convict transport ship Hillsborough, recorded two such observations in his detailed daily journal. The first was in the Southern Ocean midway between Cape Town and Sydney and the second was in the Tasman Sea, a day out of Port Jackson:

26 June 1799: At 4 Began to Blow very Hard with Heavy Shower of Rain & Hail and Extraordinary Heavy Clap of Thunder & Lightning when fell a Cormesant [corposant] a Body of Fire which collect from the Lightning & Lodge itself in the Foretopmast Head where it was first seen by our Captain when followed a Heavy Clap of Thunder & Lightning which occasioned it to fall & Burst on the Main Deck the Electrific of the Bursting of this Ball of Fire had such power as to shake several of their Leg not only On the Main Deck as the fire Hung much round the smith Forge being Iron but had the same Effect on the Gun Deck & Orlop [deck] on several of the Convicts.
25 July 1799: We were now sourounded with Heavy Thunder & Lightning and the Dismal Element foaming all round us Shocking to see with a Cormesant Hanging at the Maintop mast Head the Seamen was here Shock'd when a flash of Lightning came Burst the Cormesant & Struck two of the Seamen for several Hours Stone Blind & several much hurt in their Eyes.

While the exact nature of these weather phenomena cannot be certain, they appear to be mostly about two observations of St. Elmo's fire with perhaps some ball lightning and even a direct lightning strike to the ship thrown into the mix.

=== James Braid ===
On 20 February 1817, (Note: It was of high significance that this was during the period of extraordinary atmospheric effects and dramatic reduction in temperatures following an earlier series of massive volcano eruptions that were ultimately responsible for the Year Without a Summer.) during a severe electrical storm, James Braid, surgeon at Lord Hopetoun's mines at Leadhills, Lanarkshire, had an extraordinary experience whilst on horseback:

On Thursday 20th, I was gratified for a few minutes with the luminous appearance described above [viz., "such flashes of lightning from the west, repeated every two or three minutes, sometimes at shorter intervals, as appeared to illumine the whole heavens"]. It was about nine o'clock, P.M. I had no sooner got on horseback than I observed the tips of both the horse's ears to be quite luminous: the edges of my hat had the same appearance. I was soon deprived of these luminaries by a shower of moist snow which immediately began to fall. The horse's ears soon became wet and lost their luminous appearance; but the edges of my hat, being longer of getting wet, continued to give the luminous appearance somewhat longer.

I could observe an immense number of minute sparks darting towards the horse's ears and the margin of my hat, which produced a very beautiful appearance, and I was sorry to be so soon deprived of it.

The atmosphere in this neighbourhood appeared to be very highly electrified for eight or ten days about this time. Thunder was heard occasionally from 15th to 23rd, during which time the weather was very unsteady: frequent showers of hail, snow, rain, &c.

I can find no person in this quarter who remembers to have ever seen the luminous appearance mentioned above, before this season, – or such a quantity of lightning darting across the heavens, – nor who have heard so much thunder at that season of the year.

This country being all stocked with sheep, and the herds having frequent occasion to pay attention to the state of the weather, it is not to be thought that such an appearance can have been at all frequent, and none of them to have observed it. (Note: Braid also writes that one of his friends had a similar experience on the evening of the preceding Saturday: in which, his friend reported, he had seen "his horse's ears being the same as two burning candles, and the edges of his hat being all in a flame" (p. 471).)

— James Braid, 1817

Weeks earlier, reportedly on 17 January 1817, a luminous snowstorm occurred in Vermont and New Hampshire. Saint Elmo's fire appeared as static discharges on roof peaks, fence posts, and the hats and fingers of people. Thunderstorms prevailed over central New England.

=== Charles Darwin ===
Charles Darwin noted the effect while aboard the Beagle. He wrote of the episode in a letter to J. S. Henslow that one night when the Beagle was anchored in the estuary of the Río de la Plata:

Everything is in flames – the sky with lightning, the water with luminous particles, and even the very masts are pointed with a blue flame.

— Charles Darwin, 1832

He also describes the above night in his book The Voyage of the Beagle:

On a second night we witnessed a splendid scene of natural fireworks; the mast-head and yard-arm-ends shone with St.Elmo's light; and the form of the vane could almost be traced, as if it had been rubbed with phosphorous. The sea was so highly luminous, that the tracks of the penguins were marked by a fiery wake, and the darkness of the sky was momentarily illuminated by the most vivid lightning.

— Charles Darwin, 1832

=== Richard Henry Dana ===
In Two Years Before the Mast, Richard Henry Dana Jr., (1815–1882) describes seeing a corposant in the horse latitudes of the northern Atlantic Ocean. However, he may have been talking about ball lightning; as mentioned earlier, it is often erroneously identified as St. Elmo's fire:

The observation by R. H. Dana of this phenomenon in Two Years Before the Mast is a straightforward description of an extraordinary experience apparently only known to mariners and airline pilots.

There, directly over where we had been standing, upon the main top-gallant mast-head, was a ball of light, which the sailors name a corposant (corpus sancti), and which the mate had called out to us to look at. They were all watching it carefully, for sailors have a notion that if the corposant rises in the rigging it is a sign of fair weather, but if it comes lower down, there will be a storm. Unfortunately, as an omen, it came down, and showed itself on the topgallant yardarm. We were off the yard in good season, for it is held as a fatal sign to have the pale light of the corposant thrown upon one's face.

— Richard Henry Dana, 1840

=== Nikola Tesla ===
Nikola Tesla created St. Elmo's fire in 1899 while testing a Tesla coil at his laboratory in Colorado Springs, Colorado, United States. St. Elmo's fire was seen around the coil and was said to have lit up the wings of butterflies with blue halos as they flew around.

=== Mark Heald ===
A minute before the crash of the Luftschiffbau Zeppelin's LZ 129 Hindenburg on 6 May 1937, Professor Mark Heald (1892–1971) of Princeton saw St. Elmo's Fire flickering along the airship's back. Standing outside the main gate to the Naval Air Station, he watched, together with his wife and son, as the airship approached the mast and dropped her bow lines. A minute thereafter, by Heald's estimation, he first noticed a dim "blue flame" flickering along the backbone girder about one-quarter the length abaft the bow to the tail. There was time for him to remark to his wife, "Oh, heavens, the thing is afire," for her to reply, "Where?" and for him to answer, "Up along the top ridge" – before there was a big burst of flaming hydrogen from a point he estimated to be about one-third the ship's length from the stern.

=== William L. Laurence ===
St. Elmo's fire was reported by The New York Times reporter William L. Laurence on 9 August 1945, as he was aboard a plane following Bockscar on the way to Nagasaki.

I noticed a strange, eerie light coming through the window high above in the Navigator's cabin and as I peered through the dark all around us I saw a startling phenomenon. The whirling giant propellers had somehow become great luminous discs of blue flame. The same luminous blue flame appeared on the plexiglass windows in the nose of the ship, and on the tips of the giant wings it looked as though we were riding the whirlwind through space on a chariot of blue fire. It was, I surmised, a surcharge of static electricity that had accumulated on the tips of the propellers and on the dielectric material in the plastic windows. One's thoughts dwelt anxiously on the precious cargo in the invisible ship ahead of us. Was there any likelihood of danger that this heavy electric tension in the atmosphere all about us may set it off? I express my fears to Captain Bock, who seems nonchalant and imperturbed at the controls. He quickly reassures me: "It is a familiar phenomenon seen often on ships. I have seen it many times on bombing missions. It is known as St. Elmo's Fire."

== In popular culture ==
=== In literature ===
One of the earliest references to the phenomenon appears in Alcaeus's Fragment 34a about the Dioscuri, or Castor and Pollux. It is also referenced in Homeric Hymn 33 to the Dioscuri who were from Homeric times associated with it. Whether the Homeric Hymn antedates the Alcaeus fragment is unknown.

The phenomenon appears to be described first in the Gesta Herwardi, written around 1100 and concerning an event of the 1070s. However, one of the earliest direct references to St. Elmo's fire made in fiction can be found in Ludovico Ariosto's epic poem Orlando Furioso (1516). It is located in the 17th canto (19th in the revised edition of 1532) after a storm has punished the ship of Marfisa, Astolfo, Aquilant, Grifon, and others, for three straight days, and is positively associated with hope:

But now St. Elmo's fire appeared, which they had so longed for, it settled at the bows of a fore stay, the masts and yards all being gone, and gave them hope of calmer airs.

— Ludovico Ariosto, 1516

In William Shakespeare's The Tempest (c. 1623), Act I, Scene II, St. Elmo's fire acquires a more negative association, appearing as evidence of the tempest inflicted by Ariel according to the command of Prospero:

PROSPERO

Hast thou, spirit,
Perform'd to point the tempest that I bade thee?

ARIEL

To every article.
I boarded the king's ship; now on the beak,
Now in the waist, the deck, in every cabin,
I flamed amazement: sometime I'd divide,
And burn in many places; on the topmast,
The yards and bowsprit, would I flame distinctly,
Then meet and join.

— Act I, Scene II, The Tempest

The fires are also mentioned as "death fires" in Samuel Taylor Coleridge's The Rime of the Ancient Mariner:

About, about, in reel and rout,
The death fires danced at night;
The water, like a witch's oils,
Burnt green and blue and white.

— l. 127–130

Later in the 18th and 19th centuries, literature associated St. Elmo's fire with a bad omen or divine judgment, coinciding with the growing conventions of Romanticism and the Gothic novel. For example, in Ann Radcliffe's The Mysteries of Udolpho (1794), during a thunderstorm above the ramparts of the castle:

"And what is that tapering of light you bear?" said Emily, "see how it darts upwards,—and now it vanishes!"

"This light, lady," said the soldier, "has appeared to-night as you see it, on the point of my lance, ever since I have been on watch; but what it means I cannot tell."

"This is very strange!" said Emily.

"My fellow-guard," continued the man, "has the same flame on his arms; he says he has sometimes seen it before...he says it is an omen, lady, and bodes no good."

"And what harm can it bode?" rejoined Emily.

"He knows not so much as that, lady."

— Vol. III, Ch. IV, The Mysteries of Udolpho

In the 1864 novel Journey to the Centre of the Earth by Jules Verne, the author describes the fire occurring while sailing during a subterranean electrical storm (chapter 35, page 191):

On the mast already I see the light play of a lambent St. Elmo's fire; the outstretched sail catches not a breath of wind, and hangs like a sheet of lead.

In Herman Melville's novel Moby-Dick, Starbuck points out "corpusants" during a thunder storm in the Japanese sea in chapter 119, "The Candles".

St. Elmo's fire makes an appearance in The Adventures of Tintin comic, Tintin in Tibet, by Hergé. Tintin recognizes the phenomenon on Captain Haddock's ice-axe.

The phenomenon appears in the first stanza of Robert Hayden's poem "The Ballad of Nat Turner"; it is also referred to with the term "corposant" in the first section of his long poem "Middle Passage".

In Kurt Vonnegut's Slaughterhouse-Five, Billy Pilgrim sees the phenomenon on soldiers' helmets and on rooftops. Vonnegut's The Sirens of Titan also notes the phenomenon affecting Winston Niles Rumfoord's dog, Kazak, the Hound of Space, in conjunction with solar disturbances of the chrono-synclastic infundibulum.

In Robert Aickman's story "Niemandswasser" (1975), the protagonist, Prince Albrecht von Allendorf, is "known as Elmo to his associates, because of the fire which to them emanated from him". "There was an inspirational force in Elmo of which the sensitive soon became aware, and which had led to his Spottname or nickname."

In On the Banks of Plum Creek by Laura Ingalls Wilder, St. Elmo's fire is seen by the girls and Ma during one of the blizzards. It was described as coming down the stove pipe and rolling across the floor following Ma's knitting needles; it did not burn the floor (pages 309–310). The phenomenon as described, however, is more similar to ball lightning.

In Voyager, the third major novel in Diana Gabaldon's popular Outlander series, the primary characters experience St. Elmo's fire while lost at sea in a thunderstorm between Hispaniola and coastal Georgia.

St. Elmo's fire is also mentioned in the novel, Castaways of the Flying Dutchman by Brian Jacques.

It is referenced multiple times in the novel Pet Sematary by Stephen King.

It is referenced multiple times in the Urban-Fantasy series The Dresden Files by Jim Butcher, particularly when magical beings such as the protagonist's dog are exerting power, especially during conflict, or to describe the visual effects of magic being used.

In Larry McMurtry's Pulitzer Prize-winning novel Lonesome Dove (1985), St. Elmo's Fire appears twice during two dramatic thunderstorms on the cattle drive (chapters 31 and 62):

To his amazement he saw that the cattle seemed to have caught the lightning—little blue balls of it rolled along their horns… "Ride off the cattle," he said. "Don't get close to them when they got the lightning on their horns. Get away from 'em".

=== In television ===
On the children's television series The Mysterious Cities of Gold (1982), episode four shows St. Elmo's fire affecting the ship as it sailed past the Strait of Magellan. The real-life footage at the end of the episode has snippets of an interview with Japanese sailor Fukunari Imada, whose comments were translated to: "Although I've never seen St. Elmo's fire, I'd certainly like to. It was often considered a bad omen, as it played havoc with compasses and equipment". The TV series also referred to St. Elmo's fire as being a bad omen during the cartoon. The footage was captured as part of his winning solo yacht race in 1981.

On the American television series Rawhide, in a 1959 episode titled "Incident of the Blue Fire", cattle drovers on a stormy night see St. Elmo's fire glowing on the horns of their steers, which the men regard as a deadly omen. St. Elmo's fire is also referenced in a 1965 episode of Bonanza in which religious pilgrims staying on the Cartwright property believe an experience with St. Elmo's fire is the work of Satan.

On The Waltons episode "The Grandchild" (1977), Mary Ellen witnesses St. Elmo's Fire while running through the woods.

In the Western miniseries Lonesome Dove (1989–1990), lightning strikes a herd of cattle during a storm, causing their horns to glow blue.

On the American animated television series Futurama episode titled "Möbius Dick", Turanga Leela refers to the phenomenon as "Tickle me Elmo's Fire."

On the Netflix original Singaporean animated series Trese (2021), the Santelmo (St. Elmo's Fire) is one of the protagonist's Alexandra Trese's allies, whom she contacts using her old Nokia phone, dialing the date of the Great Binondo fire, 0003231870.

=== In film ===
- In Moby Dick (1956), St. Elmo's fire stops Captain Ahab from killing Starbuck.
- In The Last Sunset (1961), outlaw/cowhand Brendan "Bren" O'Malley (Kirk Douglas) rides in from the herd and leads the recently widowed Belle Breckenridge (Dorothy Malone) to an overview of the cattle. As he takes the rifle from her, he proclaims, "Something out there, you could live five lifetimes, and never see again," the audience is then shown a shot of the cattle with a blue or violet glow coming from their horns. "Look. St. Elmo's fire. Never seen it except on ships," O'Malley says as Belle says, "I've never seen it anywhere. What is it?" Trying to win her back, he says, "Well, a star fell and smashed and scattered its glow all over the place."
- In St. Elmo's Fire (1985), Rob Lowe's character Billy Hicks erroneously claims that the phenomenon is "not even a real thing."
- In The Hunt for Red October (1990) during a scene where the USS Dallas, a Los-Angeles-class submarine, is attempting to evade a torpedo, the crew discusses the presence of St. Elmo's fire on the sub's periscope.
- In The Perfect Storm, based on the true story of the Andrea Gail fishing vessel, there is a scene where the crew encounters St. Elmo's fire during the height of a storm.
- In Lars von Trier's 2011 film Melancholia, the phenomenon features in the opening sequence and later in the film as the rogue planet Melancholia approaches the Earth for an impact event.
- In Robert Eggers's 2019 horror film The Lighthouse, it appears in reference to the mysterious salvation that lighthouse keeper Thomas Wake (Willem Dafoe) is hiding from Ephraim Winslow (Robert Pattinson) inside the Fresnel lens of the lantern.

=== In music ===
- Brian Eno's third studio album Another Green World (1975) contains a song titled "St. Elmo's Fire" in which guesting King Crimson guitarist Robert Fripp (credited with playing "Wimshurst guitar" in the liner notes) improvises a lightning-fast solo that would imitate an electrical charge between two poles on a Wimshurst high-voltage generator.
- "St. Elmo's Fire (Man in Motion)" is a song recorded by John Parr. It hit number one on the Billboard Hot 100 on 7 September 1985, remaining there for two weeks. It was the main theme for Joel Schumacher's 1985 film St. Elmo's Fire.
- The Sammarinese entry for the 2017 Eurovision Song Contest in Kyiv "Spirit of the Night" contains references to St. Elmo's Fire.
- ”La Petite Servante” is a French art song for voice and piano, composed by Francis Poulenc. The text is a poem by Max Jacob. It was published in 1932 in a song cycle called Cinq Poèmes de Max Jacob.

== See also ==
- Earthquake light – Reported luminous phenomenon associated with earthquakes
- Foo fighter – UFOs reported in the 1940s
- Hessdalen lights – Unidentified phenomenon at Hessdalen valley in Norway
- Naga fireball – Atmospheric phenomenon on the Mekong River
- Paulding Light – Light that appears in a Michigan valley
- Plasma globe – Decorative electrical device
- Stellar Corona – Outermost layer of a star's atmosphere
- Triboelectric effect – Charge transfer due to contact or sliding
- Will-o'-the-wisp – Atmospheric ghost lights
