= Zwodziasz =

Zwodziasz, known also as zwodzijos (Sieradz), is a diabolic creature in Slavic mythology. It was said to lead people astray and decoy them into wasteland, making them lose their way and often indirectly becoming the cause of their sudden death. In tales of people from Kalisz and its vicinity, zwodziasz is portrayed as a nightjar.

== See also ==
- Will-o'-the-wisp
