= Longdendale lights =

Mysterious lights reported in the Peak District of England

The Longdendale lights are mystery lights that have been observed at the upper end of the Longdendale valley and surrounding areas in the Peak District in northern England. Reports of the lights date back centuries and they have also been known as the 'Devil's bonfires'.

== History ==
Ghost lights are a recurring feature of the wider Pennines landscape. In some cases, a solitary, large, bright light is observed. In other cases, the lights appear small and in clusters. In these reports, the lights are often different colours and sometimes are observed moving rapidly. The lights have been seen by individuals as well as by large groups. On several occasions, lights described as distress flares have been reported by hikers, resulting in rescue teams being called out to the area, only to find nobody during their search. There is no physical evidence in the form of photographs or video of any of the claimed lights, despite being close to the very busy A628 road. A live webcam previously existed to allow people from outside the area to view the lights for themselves. The Distant Hills brewery, based in nearby Glossop, has brewed 'Brights Lights' and 'Longdendale Lights'; both beverages are named in honour of the famous mystery lights of the area.

== Legends ==
Legends and folk tales hold that the lights are witches or spirits and possibly omens of death or disaster. According to one local story, the lights are the torches of the ghosts of Roman soldiers “who tramp across the moor every year on the night of the first full moon in Spring”.

== Explanations ==
Misidentification has been suggested as the cause of some or even all of the sightings. The area is very isolated and the lights from far-away cars or houses could easily be mistaken for something else. Some have also suggested aeroplanes flying to and from nearby Manchester Airport as the cause of the sightings. Sightings of the planet Venus and flash lights of game keepers hunting foxes on the moors at night have also been suggested as the cause of misidentifications.

== See also ==
- Aleya (Ghost light), Bengal
- Aurora
- Brown Mountain lights
- Chir Batti
- Gurdon Light
- Hessdalen lights
- Min Min light
- Paulding Light
- The Spooklight
- St. Louis light
