= Brown Mountain lights =

Purported ghost lights near Brown Mountain, North Carolina

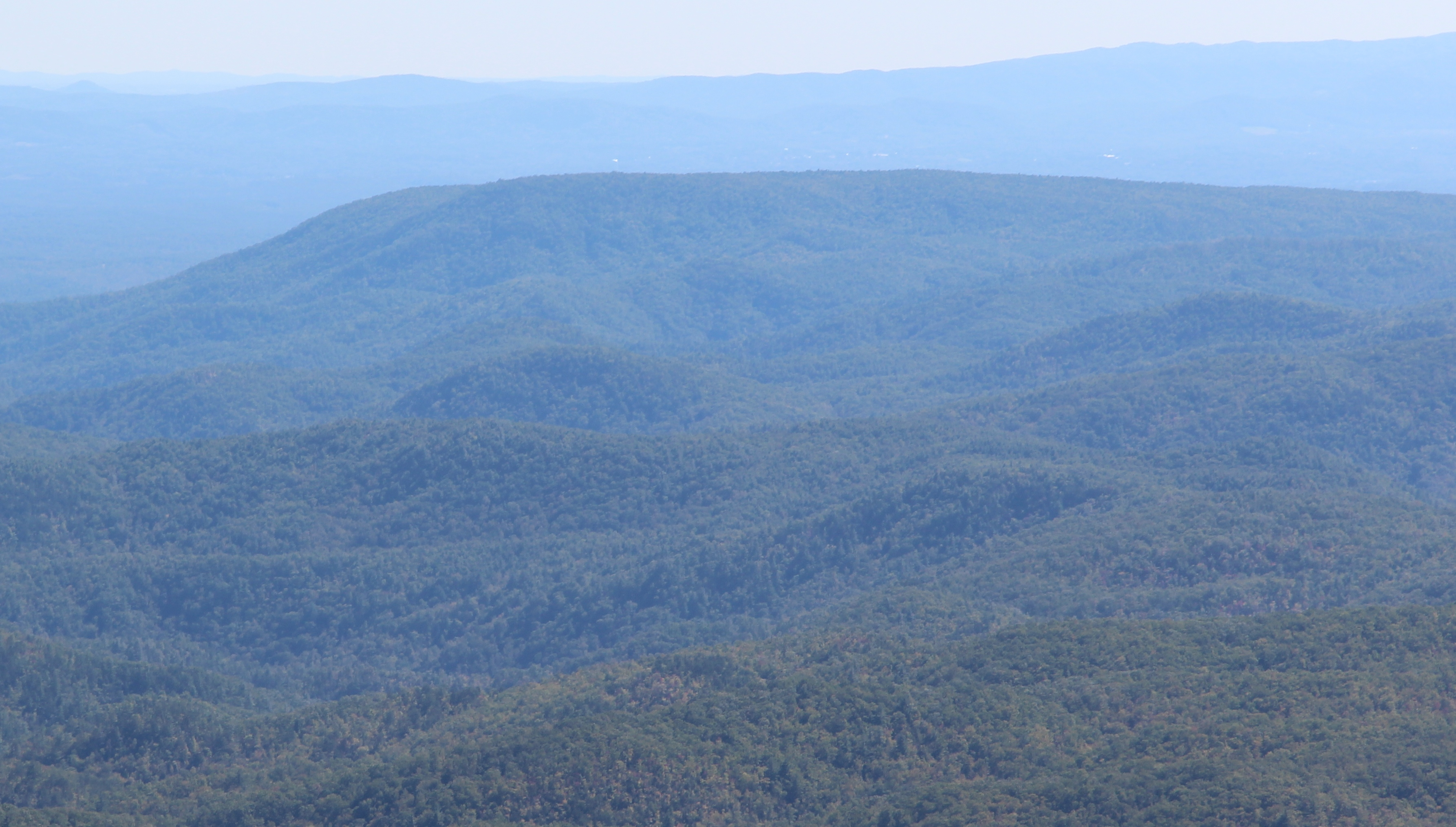
Brown Mountain

The Brown Mountain lights are purported ghost lights near Brown Mountain in North Carolina. The earliest published references to strange lights there are from around 1910, at about the same time electric lighting was becoming widespread in the area. In 1922, a USGS scientist, George R. Mansfield, used a map and an alidade telescope to prove that the lights that were being seen were trains, car headlights, and brush fires, which ended widespread public concern.

With the original sightings of the early 20th century having been explained, storytellers have been creating imaginary pre-electrification histories of the lights ever since, and the nature of claimed encounters with the lights appears to have changed over the years to suit changing cultural expectations.

== History ==
=== Origin and explanation of the lights ===
The earliest published mentions of the lights begin in 1912, on the heels of the first publication of Jules Verne's 1906 novel Master of the World in English in 1911. An important plot point in the novel consists of a mad scientist constructing an airship inside his secret lair in Table Rock, near Morganton, North Carolina, activities which cause strange lights to appear on the summit of the mountain. The rapidly expanding electrification of the Linville Gorge area from the 1890s through the 1910s, seems to be the origin of the Brown Mountain lights legend, possibly helped by Verne's novel. A number of travelogues, including accounts of mysterious happenings and ghost stories, were published about the region prior to 1900, but there is no mention of unexplained lights in any of these historical sources. Mansfield's investigation found many locals were unaware of any strange lights until 1910 or later. Joseph Loven, who lived next to Loven's Hotel, said he had first noticed the lights in 1897, but took no interest in them, and didn't hear anyone else talking about them, until his neighbor, C. E. Gregory, began trying to draw public attention to them around 1910. Also, Southern Railway had begun upgrading their locomotive headlamps to 600,000 candlepower systems in 1909, rendering their trains' light output greater than that of some lighthouses that were in operation at the time.

One early account of the lights dates from September 24, 1913, as reported in the Charlotte Daily Observer. It described “mysterious lights seen just above the horizon every night,” red in color, appearing “punctually” at 7:30 PM and again at 10 PM, attributing the information to Anderson Loven, “an old and reliable resident”.

As in Verne's novel, locals asked their Congressmen for a government investigation; in 1913 United States Geological Survey employee, D.B. Sterrett, was dispatched to the area and quickly found that the headlights of westbound Southern Railway locomotives would have been visible from Loven's Hotel, and the train schedules he consulted left him no doubt that these were the cause of the lights that were being reported. In July 1916, a flood caused train activity around Brown Mountain to cease for several weeks, which provided an opportunity for some to doubt Sterrett's conclusions. George Anderson Loven, whose hotel was doing a good business from all the visitors keen to see the light, told the Lenoir News that September that it was still being seen nightly, although it isn't clear whether it was one specific light that he referred to, or many different lights, or possibly even every nighttime light visible from his hotel that he considered mysterious. It was never required that train headlights be the only mystery light source, as car headlights were another likely contributor, but this argument is often repeated today.

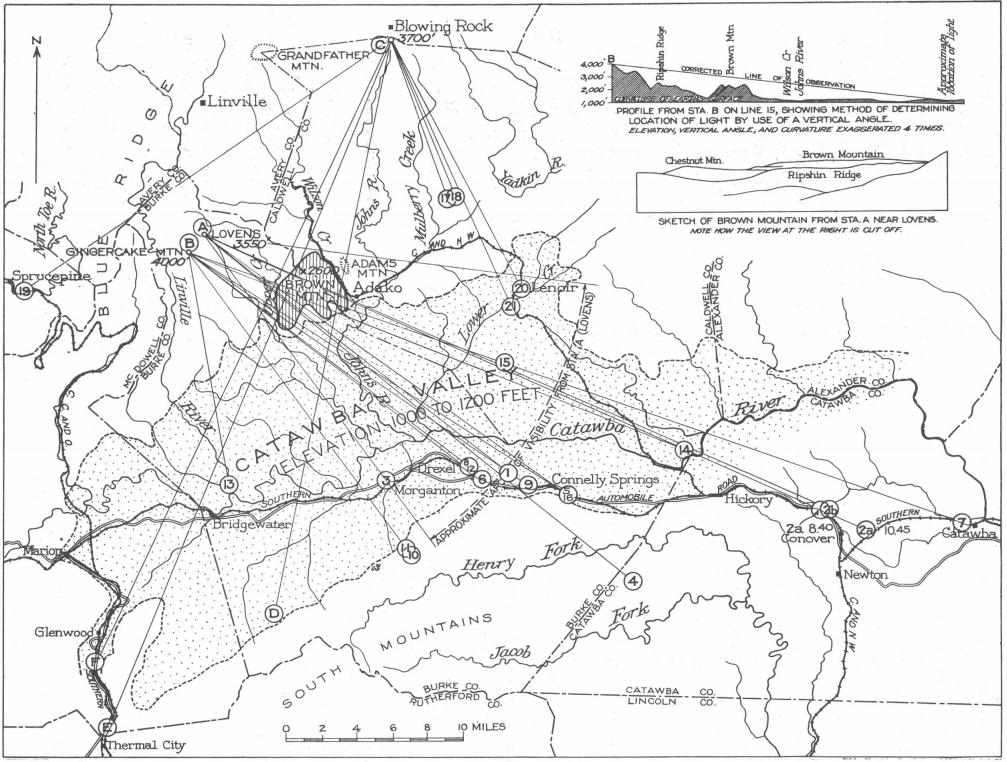
Mansfield used an alidade to plot this map of the Brown Mountain light sources (numbered). From various high elevation overlooks along the Blue Ridge, it was easily possible to see distant electric lights, including train and automobile headlights, near towns along the Catawba River valley. Most of the sight lines to Loven's Hotel and the other main viewing sites happened to pass hundreds of feet over Brown Mountain (hatched area), giving observers the impression that the mountain was in some way connected to the lights.

With Sterrett's investigation being considered inadequate by locals, the USGS sent Mansfield to investigate in 1922. As part of his investigation, Mansfield set up an alidade telescope near Loven's Hotel, at the former home of C. E. Gregory. Accompanied by members of the Loven family, he recorded a number of nighttime lights, one of which appeared to move and flare in brightness, making Joseph Loven call it a true Brown Mountain light, but which through the telescope proved to be stationary throughout the entire evening, despite repeated azimuth readings being taken. Another series of lights that were seen were found to plot on a map to a curve in a Southern Railway track, and the time of appearance of that light corresponded exactly to that of a scheduled train. At the end of the observing session, Robert Loven said that he didn't believe that the lights they had seen were bright enough to be genuine Brown Mountain lights, but Joseph Loven said that he considered the lights they saw to have been an average display of the phenomenon. After Mansfield's investigation found the lights to be distant car and train headlights, and brush fires, Joseph Loven, who had inherited the hotel from his father and had been one of the main commentators and local experts on the Brown Mountain lights in the newspapers, seemed to disappear from further commentary on the lights in print for the rest of his life. Ed Speer interprets this as a sign that Mansfield's investigation might have solved the mystery for Loven, as it did for most people.

Ever since Mansfield demonstrated that the Brown Mountain lights that were being seen in 1922 were nothing stranger than distant electric lights, local writers have tried to protect the mystery by inventing new tales of the lights' origins; one apparent goal of this storytelling is to try to insinuate the idea that the lights had been seen before trains and electrification. The first publication of a claim that the lights were in any way referenced by a Native American culture was an article in the Asheville Citizen in 1938; it was merely asserted as fact with no sources being provided. Experts on historical Native American traditions state that this is a myth that was invented by white people to justify their own beliefs in the lights. A new variant of an older ghost story about a woman and baby murdered in the Jonas Ridge community became the first published ghost story to incorporate the lights in 1936. Other ghost stories in similar vein were devised through the rest of the 20th century to the present. Newer ghost stories about the lights include one about a Revolutionary War soldier that was first published in 1982; while a story linking the lights to Civil War ghosts was first seen in 2012, on the internet. The UFO movement began to influence the Brown Mountain lore in the mid-20th century. Ralph Lael, who used to display what he claimed was a mummified alien in his rock shop, self published a book detailing his claimed extraterrestrial encounters on Brown Mountain, and his trip with the aliens to their home planet of Venus, in 1965. At some point, a transition took place between the distant lights that were the foundation of the original legend, and the much more recent stories that feature 'close encounters' with glowing spheres that float in the air, stories that are notably absent from the early 20th century reports, even though thousands of loggers were working in the Brown Mountain area then. Currently, the lights draw people interested in the popular 'ghost hunting' hobby, providing them a supposedly haunted location to investigate. The lights, as a cultural phenomenon, evolved over time to suit the desires and changing expectations of the people who participate in that culture, including borrowings from outside.

=== Fate Wiseman's light ===
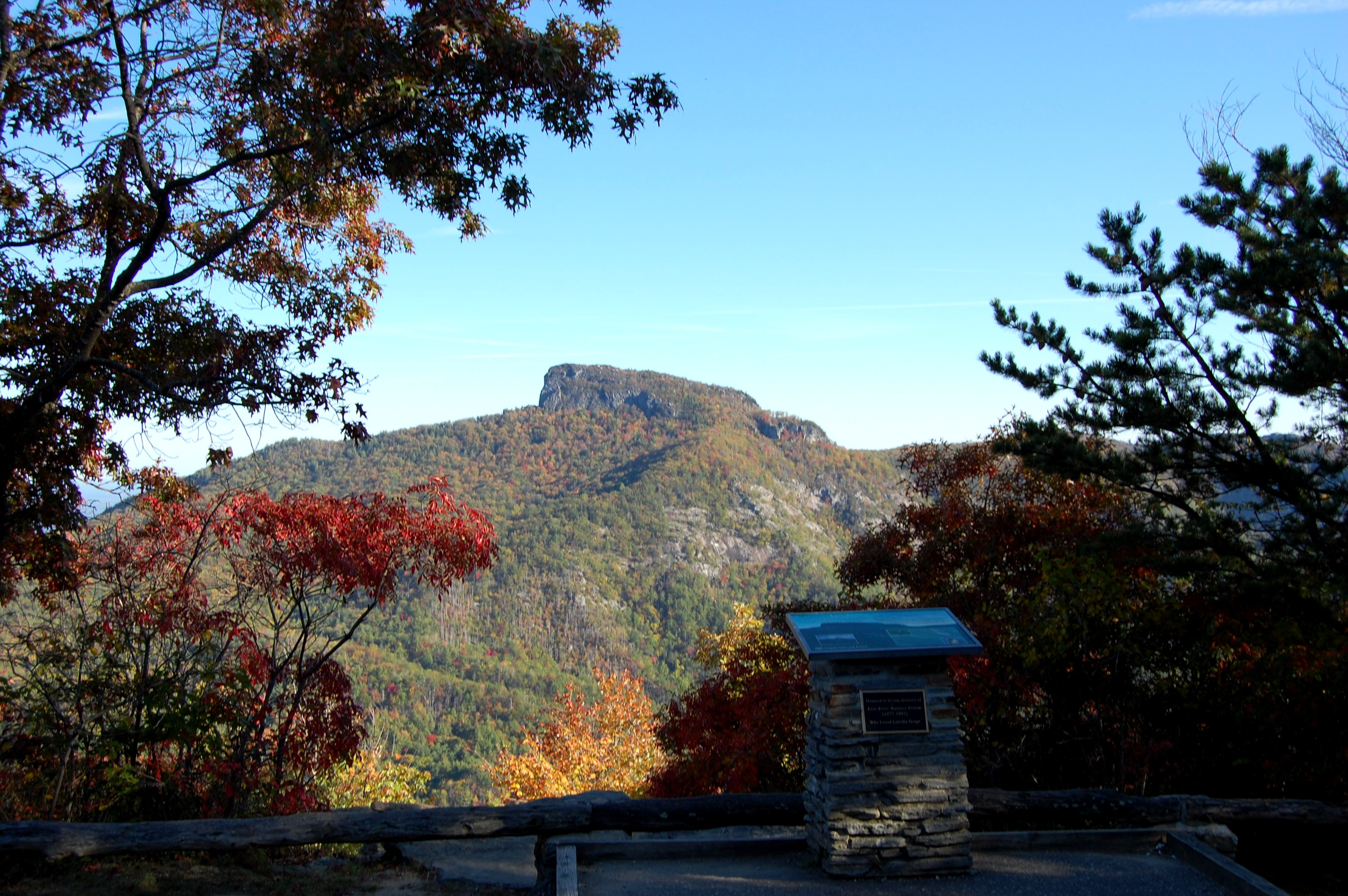
Table Rock, as seen from Wiseman's View. Table Rock is a popular rock climbing site in North Carolina, complete with its own parking area, and "mystery lights" seen among the trees from this viewpoint are likely to be car headlights or hikers and climbers with flashlights.

Josiah Lafayette "Fate" Wiseman (1842–1932) was the great-uncle of Scotty Wiseman, whose song, The Legend of the Brown Mountain Lights (1961), greatly popularized the Brown Mountain lights, making them the most popular ghost story in North Carolina. His is also the oldest report of a strange light near Brown Mountain, though it wasn't well known at the time, and played no role in founding the legend. According to a tradition that was passed down through the Wiseman family, but that wasn't published until 1971, some time "around 1854" young Fate Wiseman was camping at Wiseman's View with his father when he first noticed a flash of light in the distance. Wiseman found that the same momentary flash would appear at the same place on the horizon at about the same time (varying by at most half an hour) each and every night. He would often return to the place and, at the expected time, he would stare into the distance until he saw a glimpse of the light.

It is unknown how reliable or precise the date of "around 1854" is, because the source, Scotty Wiseman, was remembering things that 79-year-old Fate had told him when he was 13 years old, 50 years prior. However, the description of the light is consistent with a distant train headlight turning a corner, the first train in western North Carolina began nightly service between Morganton and Salisbury in 1858, and trains are known for following consistent and regular schedules, as the light did.

=== John William Gerard de Brahm ===
In 1771, military engineer, cartographer, mystic, and "eccentric genius" John William Gerard de Brahm presented a report to King George III, Report of the General Survey in the Southern District of North America, primarily describing the geography of East Florida, with sections on Georgia and South Carolina. An inaccurate claim that de Brahm made a reference to Brown Mountain lights in this report is often repeated. The text in question is quoted here:

Although these Mountains transpire through their Tops sulphurueaous and arsenical Sublimations, yet they are too light, as precipitate so their Sublimitories, but are carried away by the Winds to distant Regions. In a heavy Atmosphere, the nitrous Vapours are swallowed up through the Spiraculs of the Mountains, and thus the Country is cleared from their Corrosion; when the Atmosphere is light, these nitrous Vapours rise up to the arsenical and sulphureous (subliming through the Expiraculs of the Mountains), and when they meet with each other in Contact, the Niter inflames, vulgurates, and detonates, whence the frequent Thunders, in which a most votalized Spirit of Niter ascends to purify inspire the upper Air, and a phlogiston Regeneratum (the metallic Seed) descends to impregnate the Bowels of the Earth; and as all these Mountains form so many warm Athanors which draw and absorb, especially in foggy Seasons, all corrosive Effluvia along with the heavy Air through the Registers (Spiracles) and thus cease not from the Perpetual Circulation of the Air, corroding Vapours are no sooner raised, than that they are immediately disposed of, consequently the Air in the Appalachian Mountains is extreamely pure and healthy.

Clearly, de Brahm is using mystical or alchemical language to speculate about the causes of thunderstorms and clean mountain air, and this has nothing to do with Brown Mountain lights. It is also not known if de Brahm (who lived in Florida, Georgia, and South Carolina at various times) ever set foot in North Carolina; de Brahm never describes anything in North Carolina in his report, and this passage is found in a chapter about South Carolina. The first attempt to link de Brahm to Brown Mountain lights was an article in the Gastonia Daily Gazette, which is no longer in print and not to be confused for modern day newspapers with similar names, in 1927.

== Research ==
Appalachian State University installed two low light cameras on rooftops that overlook Brown Mountain and Linville Gorge; by 2014 these cameras had produced 6,300 viewing hours worth of data without any unexplainable lights being recorded.

== Viewing locations ==
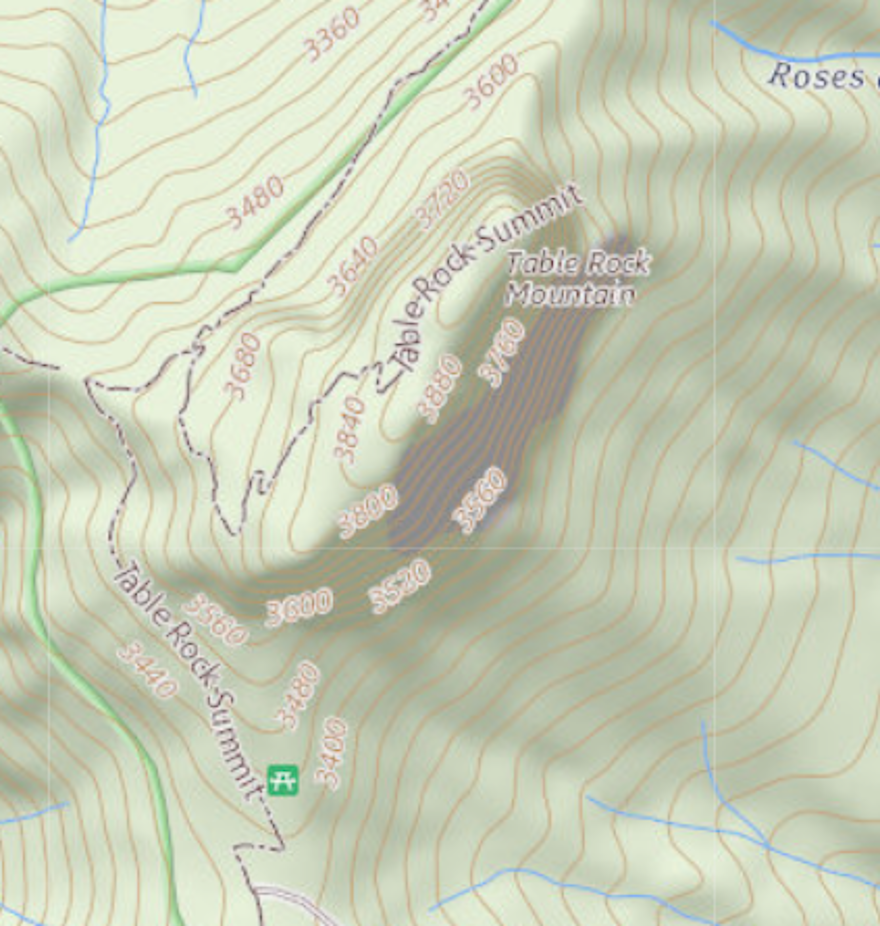
A popular trail that goes to the top of Table Rock Mountain weaves up the side that faces Wiseman's View.

There are roadside locations for observing the purported lights on the Blue Ridge Parkway at mile posts 310 (Brown Mountain overlook) and 301 (Green Mountain overlook) and from the Brown Mountain Overlook along North Carolina Highway 181 (NC 181), near Jonas Ridge, North Carolina. Additionally, lights have been reported from the top of Table Rock and Wiseman's View, both located in the Linville Gorge Wilderness.

== In popular culture ==
The lights are the inspiration for the bluegrass song “Brown Mountain Lights,” by Scotty Wiseman, later performed by The Hillmen (Vern Gosdin – vocals) and also The Kingston Trio and the Country Gentlemen. In this version, the light is being carried by "a faithful old slave/come back from the grave" who is searching for his lost master. The song was also recorded by the progressive bluegrass band Acoustic Syndicate and performed by Yonder Mountain String Band. This song was also performed and recorded by Sonny James, Tommy Faile, and Tony Rice.

The 1999 episode "Field Trip" of the paranormal drama show The X-Files centered around a mysterious case of missing hikers who are found dead in the vicinity of the Brown Mountains of North Carolina; the show mentions the Brown Mountain lights (the show's main character Fox Mulder believed it was due to UFOs).

It was featured in episodes of Weird or What?, Ancient Aliens, and Mystery Hunters.

It is described as the basis for the 2014 feature film Alien Abduction.

The mountains and the lights are featured in Speaking in Bones (2015) by Kathy Reichs.

Founded in 2022, the Brown Mountain Lights Festival is an annual festival that highlights local bands and artisans in Morganton, focusing on the more supernatural side of the so-called "ghost lights."

== See also ==
- Chir Batti
- Gurdon light
- Hessdalen lights
- Invented tradition
- Longdendale lights
- Maco light
- Marfa lights
- Min Min light
- Naga fireball
- Paulding Light

== Sources ==
- Jerome Clark, Unexplained! 347 Strange Sightings, Incredible Occurrences, and Puzzling Physical Phenomena, Visible Ink Press, 1993.
