= Chir batti =

Ghost light reported in the Banni grasslands, Kutch district, Gujarat State, India

Chir batti, chhir batti or cheer batti is a ghost light reported in the Banni grasslands, a seasonal marshy wetlands and adjoining desert of the marshy salt flats of the Rann of Kutch near the India–Pakistan border in Kutch district, Gujarat. Local villagers refer to the light as chir batti in the Kutchi-Sindhi language, with chir meaning ghost and batti meaning light.

It is described as an unexplained light occurring on dark nights as bright as a mercury lamp that changes its colour to blue, red and yellow and resembles a moving ball (reported also pear shaped form) of fire, which may move as fast as an arrow but may also stop. According to local folklore, these lights have been a part of life in the Banni grasslands and the adjoining Rann of Kutch for centuries, but are little known beyond the immediate area and people continue to call them "ghost lights". Witnesses claim the lights at times appear to be playing hide and seek or following them. Some reports claim the light can only be seen after 8 pm on dark nights, are always two to ten feet (0.61 to 3.05 m) above the ground, and if followed during the night, one could be misled from the road and lose their way in thorny jungles or desert of the salt flats of the Rann. A team of local and US ornithologists and soldiers of the Indian Border Security Force (BSF) who patrol the adjoining Rann of Kutch international border area of India with Pakistan have allegedly seen the light.

In modern science, it is generally accepted that most ignes fatui are caused by the oxidation of phosphine (PH_{3}), diphosphane (P_{2}H_{4}), and methane (CH_{4}). These compounds, produced by organic decay, can cause photon emissions. Since phosphine and diphosphane mixtures ignite spontaneously on contact with the oxygen in air, only small quantities of them would be needed to ignite the much more abundant methane to create ephemeral fires. Furthermore, phosphine produces phosphorus pentoxide as a by-product, which forms phosphoric acid upon contact with water vapor.

== See also ==
- Aurora
- Brown Mountain lights
- Hessdalen lights
- Longdendale lights
- Marfa lights
- Min Min light
- Naga fireball
- Will-o'-the-wisp
