= Hessdalen lights =

Unidentified phenomenon at Hessdalen valley in Norway

Coordinates: 62.7933°N 11.1883°E

The Hessdalen lights are unidentified lights which have been observed in a 12-kilometre-long (7.5 mi) stretch of the Hessdalen valley in rural central Norway periodically since at least the 1930s.

== Background ==
The Hessdalen lights appear both by day and by night, and seem to float through and above the valley. They are usually bright white, yellow or red and can appear above and below the horizon. The duration of the phenomenon may be a few seconds to well over an hour. Sometimes the lights move with enormous speed; at other times they seem to sway slowly back and forth. On yet other occasions, they hover in mid‑air.

Unusual lights have been reported in the region since at least the 1930s. Especially high activity occurred between December 1981 and mid-1984, during which the lights were observed 15–20 times per week, attracting many overnight tourists. As of 2010, the number of observations had dwindled, with only 10 to 20 sightings yearly.

Since 1983, "Project Hessdalen" initiated by UFO-Norge and UFO-Sverige have attempted to investigate the lights. This project was active as field investigations during 1983–1985. A group of students, engineers, and journalists collaborated as "The Triangle Project" in 1997–1998 and recorded the lights in a pyramid shape that bounced up and down. In 1998, the Hessdalen Automatic Measurement Station (Hessdalen AMS) was set up in the valley to register and record the appearance of lights.

Later, a programme named EMBLA was initiated to bring together established scientists and students to researching the lights. Leading research institutions are Østfold University College (Norway) and the Italian National Research Council.

== Hypotheses ==
Despite ongoing research, there is no consensus for an explanation of the phenomenon. A number of potentially plausible theories have been put forward.

There have been some sightings positively identified as misperceptions of astronomical bodies, aircraft, car headlights and mirages.

One explanation attributes the phenomenon to an incompletely understood combustion of airborne dust from mining in the area. The analysis identified hydrogen, oxygen and other elements including titanium. It was thought this occurs in Hessdalen because of the large deposits of scandium there. The publication of this research led to the Norwegian press proclaiming that "The Mystery in Hessdalen is Solved".

One hypothesis put forward in 2010 suggests that the lights are formed by a cluster of macroscopic Coulomb crystals in a plasma produced by the ionization of air and dust by alpha particles during radon decay in the dusty atmosphere. Several physical properties including oscillation, geometric structure, and light spectrum, observed in the Hessdalen lights might be explained through a dust plasma model. Radon decay produces alpha particles (responsible by helium emissions in HL spectrum) and radioactive elements such as polonium. In 2004, physicist Massimo Teodorani showed an occurrence where a higher level of radioactivity on rocks was detected near the area where a large light ball was reported. Computer simulations show that dust immersed in ionized gas can organize itself into double helixes like some occurrences of the Hessdalen lights; dusty plasmas may also form in this structure.

Another hypothesis explains Hessdalen lights as a product of piezoelectricity generated under specific rock strains, (Note: Based on 1998 research by Takaki and Ikeya.) because many crystal rocks in Hessdalen valley include quartz grains which produce an intense charge density.

=== Piezoelectricity ===
In a 2011 paper, based on the dusty plasma theory of Hessdalen lights, Gerson Paiva and Carlton Taft suggested that piezoelectricity of quartz cannot explain a peculiar property assumed by the Hessdalen lights phenomenon – the presence of geometrical structures in its center. Paiva and Taft have shown a mechanism of light ball cluster formation in Hessdalen lights by nonlinear interaction of ion-acoustic and dusty-acoustic waves with low frequency geoelectromagnetic waves in dusty plasmas. The theoretical velocity of ejected light balls is about 10,000 m/s (33,000 ft/s), in good agreement with the observed velocity of some ejected light balls, estimated at 20,000 m/s (66,000 ft/s).

The central ball is white, while the ejected balls that are observed are always green in colour. This is ascribed to radiation pressure produced by the interaction between very low frequency electromagnetic waves (VLF) and atmospheric ions (present in the central white-coloured ball) through ion-acoustic waves. O^{+}_{2} ions (electronic transition b^{4}Σ^{−}_{g} → a^{4}Π_{u}), with green emission lines, are probably the only ones transported by these waves. Electronic bands of O^{+}_{2} ions occur in auroral spectra.

The estimated temperature of Hessdalen lights is about 5,000 K (4,730 °C; 8,540 °F). At this temperature, the rate coefficients of dissociative recombination will be 10^{−8} cm^{3} s^{−1} for the oxygen ions, and 10^{−7} cm^{3} s^{−1} for the nitrogen ions. (Note: Using the measurements of electron–molecular ion dissociative recombination rate coefficients as functions of electron temperature and cross sections as a function of electron energy by Mehr and Biondi for N^{+}_{2} and O^{+}_{2} over the electron temperature interval 0.007–10 eV.) Thus, in the Hessdalen lights plasma, the nitrogen ions will decompose (N^{+}_{2} + e^{−} → N + N*) more rapidly than oxygen ions. Only ionic species are transported by ion acoustic waves. Therefore, oxygen ions will dominate in the ejected green light balls in Hessdalen lights, presenting a negative band of O^{+}_{2} with electronic transition b^{4}Σ^{−}_{g} → a^{4}Π_{u} after ion-acoustic wave formation.

Paiva and Taft presented a model for resolving the apparently contradictory spectrum observed in Hessdalen lights. The spectrum is nearly flat on the top with steep sides, due to the effect of optical thickness on the bremsstrahlung spectrum. At low frequencies self-absorption modifies the spectrum to follow the Rayleigh–Jeans part of the blackbody curve. Such a spectrum is typical of dense ionized gas. Additionally, the spectrum produced in the thermal bremsstrahlung process is flat up to a cutoff frequency, ν_{cut}, and falls off exponentially at higher frequencies. This sequence of events forms the typical spectrum of Hessdalen lights phenomenon when the atmosphere is clear, with no fog. According to the model, the spatial color distribution of luminous balls commonly observed in Hessdalen lights phenomenon is produced by electrons accelerated by electric fields during rapid fracture of piezoelectric rocks under the ground. In 2014, Jader Monari published a new Hessdalen Lights model involving a geological-like battery. Thus, two sides of the valley are the electrodes and the river Hesja can be acting as the electrolyte. Gas bubbles rise into the air and can become electrically charged producing gas luminesce and Hessdalen Lights phenomenon.

== See also ==
- Aleya (Ghost light), Bengal
- Aurora
- Ball lightning
- Brown Mountain lights
- Chir Batti
- Hessdalen AMS
- Longdendale lights
- Maco light
- Marfa lights
- Min Min light
- Naga fireballs
- Paulding Light
- St. Elmo's fire
- Will-o'-the-wisp
