= Cohoke Light =

Atmospheric light phenomenon in Virginia, USA

The Cohoke Light is a reported ghost light in King William County, Virginia near West Point. The light has been frequently sighted along a stretch of Virginia State Route 632, where Mt. Olive Cohoke Road crosses the Norfolk Southern Railway.

The light typically appears a distance of several hundred yards from the railroad crossing, approaching noiselessly while increasing in brightness. Its presence attracted large numbers of spectators from around the state throughout the 1960s and 1970s hoping to catch a glimpse of the light.

Several paranormal theories have been advanced for the origin of the Cohoke Light. In one legend, a train loaded with wounded Confederate soldiers departed from Richmond after an 1864 battle, intending to evacuate its passengers to West Point, but never arrived. Another story describes the light as the lantern of a railroad worker decapitated in a nineteenth-century train accident as he searches for his missing head. These fanciful legends are likely not based in fact; there are no records of railroad decapitations near West Point, and during the American Civil War Confederate forces in the area retreated away from West Point in the direction of Richmond, the opposite of what was described in the legend. Furthermore, the earliest accounts of the Cohoke Light date to the 1950s, long after the commonly accepted origin stories.

By 2014, appearances of the Cohoke Light had become extremely rare.
