= St. Louis light =

Mysterious beam of light reported in Canada

The St. Louis Light, St. Louis Ghost Light, or St. Louis Ghost Train is a supposed paranormal phenomenon seen near St. Louis, Saskatchewan, Canada. It has been described by witnesses as a huge beam of white light, reminiscent of a locomotive headlamp.

The phenomenon has been featured on the television series Unsolved Mysteries and entails a strange light moving up and down along an old abandoned rail line at night, changing colours and varying in brightness. The line, located south of Prince Albert and north of St. Louis, has had its tracks removed, but the phenomenon still occurs on a regular basis.

Several stories attempt to explain the lights, including that it is a ghost train, or the ghost of a drunk brakeman who lost his head to a passing train and now wanders up and down the tracks with a lantern attempting to find it. In 2014 Canada Post issued a stamp depicting the St. Louis ghost train, one of a series of five depicting Canadian ghost tales.

Two grade 12 students from La Ronge, Saskatchewan won science fair gold medals for investigating and supposedly duplicating the phenomenon, which they determined to be caused by the diffraction of distant vehicle lights. However, local residents claim that the light had been reported before the advent of cars.

== See also ==
- Longdendale lights
- Marfa lights
