= Marfa lights =

Atmospheric light phenomenon in Texas

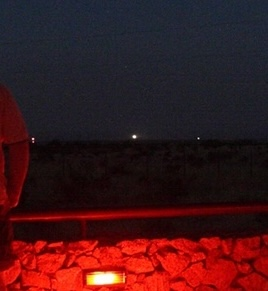
A Marfa light (center) seen from the official viewing platform east of Marfa, Texas

The Marfa lights are an optical phenomenon regularly observed near Marfa, Texas, in the United States. They are most often seen from a viewing area nearby, which the community has publicized to encourage tourism. Scientists observing the lights over the period 2000 to 2008 concluded that the lights were the results of automobile headlights being distorted by warm desert air.

== Overview ==
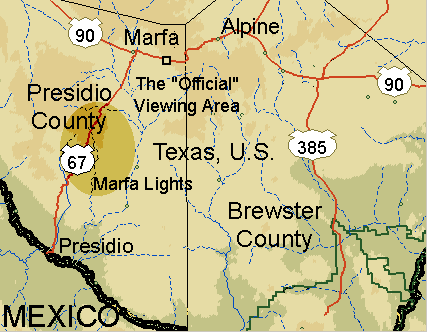
The "Marfa Lights" label within this image shows where Marfa lights can be seen.

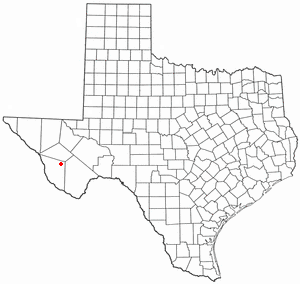
Marfa, Texas is located at 30°18′43″N 104°1′29″W.

According to Judith Brueske, the best place from which to view the lights is a widened shoulder on Highway 90 about nine miles east of Marfa. The lights are most often reported as distant spots of brightness, distinguishable from ranch lights and automobile headlights on Highway 67 (between Marfa and Presidio, to the south) primarily by their aberrant movements."

Robert and Judy Wagers define "Classic Marfa Lights" as being seen south-southwest of the Marfa Lights Viewing Center (MLVC). They define the left margin of the viewing area as being aligned along the Big Bend Telephone Company tower as viewed from the MLVC, and the right margin as Chinati Peak as viewed from the MLVC.

Referring to the Marfa Lights View Park east of Marfa, James Bunnell describes Marfa lights as "orbs of light", which change in intensity and color, which can move or remain stationary, splitting or merging. He describes the lights as being usually yellow-orange, but also occasionally other hues including green, blue, and red. He states that they usually fly above desert vegetation but below mesas in the background.

== History ==
The first historical record of the Marfa lights was in 1883 when a young cowhand, Robert Reed Ellison, saw a flickering light while he was driving cattle through Paisano Pass and wondered if it was the campfire of the Apache. Other settlers told him they often saw the lights, but that when they investigated they found no ashes or other evidence of a campsite. Joe and Anne Humphreys next reported seeing the lights in 1885.

The first published account of the lights appeared in the July 1957 issue of Coronet magazine. In 1976 Elton Miles's Tales of the Big Bend included stories dating to the 19th century and a photograph of the Marfa lights by a local rancher.

Bunnell lists 34 Marfa lights sightings from 1945 through 2008. Monitoring stations were put in place starting in 2003. He has identified "an average of 9.5 MLs on 5.25 nights per year", but believes that the monitoring stations may only be finding half of the Marfa lights in Mitchell Flat.

== Explanations ==
=== Atmospheric phenomena ===
Skeptic Brian Dunning notes that the designated "View Park" for the lights, a roadside park on the south side of U.S. Route 90 about 9 miles (14 km) east of Marfa, is at the site of Marfa Army Airfield, where tens of thousands of personnel were stationed between 1942 and 1947, training American and Allied pilots. This massive field was then used for years as a regional airport, with daily airline service. Since Marfa AAF and its satellite fields are each constantly patrolled by sentries, they consider it unlikely that any unusual phenomena would remain unobserved and unmentioned. According to Dunning, the likeliest explanation is that the lights are a sort of mirage caused by sharp temperature gradients between cold and warm layers of air. Marfa is at an elevation of 4,688 ft (1,429 m) above sea level, and differences of 40–50 °F (22–28 °C) between daily high and low temperatures are quite common.

=== Car lights ===
In May 2004 a group from the Society of Physics Students at the University of Texas at Dallas spent four days investigating and recording lights observed southwest of the view park using traffic volume-monitoring equipment, video cameras, binoculars, and chase cars. Their report made the following conclusions:

- U.S. Highway 67 is visible from the Marfa lights viewing location.
- The frequency of lights southwest of the view park correlates with the frequency of vehicle traffic on U.S. 67.
- The motion of the observed lights was in a straight line, corresponding to U.S. 67.
- When the group parked a vehicle on U.S. 67 and flashed its headlights, this was visible at the view park and appeared to be a Marfa light.
- A car passing the parked vehicle appeared as one Marfa light passing another at the view park.

They came to the conclusion that all the lights observed over a four-night period southwest of the view park could be reliably attributed to automobile headlights traveling along U.S. 67 between Marfa and Presidio, Texas.

==== Spectroscopic analysis ====
For 20 nights in May 2008, scientists from Texas State University used spectroscopy equipment to observe lights from the Marfa lights viewing station. They recorded a number of lights that "could have been mistaken for lights of unknown origin", but in each case the movements of the lights and the data from their equipment could be easily explained as automobile headlights or small fires. They concluded that due to the rarity of observation of "genuine" Marfa lights, those with odd behaviour not explainable as car lights, more research was necessary to determine their nature.

== In popular media ==
The lights have been featured and mentioned in various media, including the television show Unsolved Mysteries and an episode of King of the Hill ("Of Mice and Little Green Men") and in an episode of the Disney Channel Original Series So Weird. A book by David Morrell, 2009's The Shimmer, was inspired by the lights. The Rolling Stones mention the "lights of Marfa" in the song "No Spare Parts" from the 2011 re-release of their 1978 album Some Girls. Country music artist Paul Cauthen wrote "Marfa Lights," a love song inspired by the lights, for his 2016 album "My Gospel." In the 2019 Simpsons episode "Mad About the Toy", the family visits Marfa. Lisa tries to explain the lights but is prevented by Marge. The Union Trade had a song called "Marfa Lights" on their 2015 album "A Place Of Long Years". Mark McGuire included a song called "The Marfa Lights" on his 2009 album A Pocket Full of Rain, and later compiled in his 2011 compilation A Young Person's Guide to Mark McGuire for Editions Mego

== See also ==
- Aleya (Ghost light), Bengal
- Aurora
- Brown Mountain lights
- Chir Batti
- Gurdon Light
- Hessdalen lights
- Min Min light
- Naga fireballs
- Palatine Light
- Paulding Light
- The Spooklight
- St. Louis light
