= Min Min light =

Light phenomenon in outback Australia

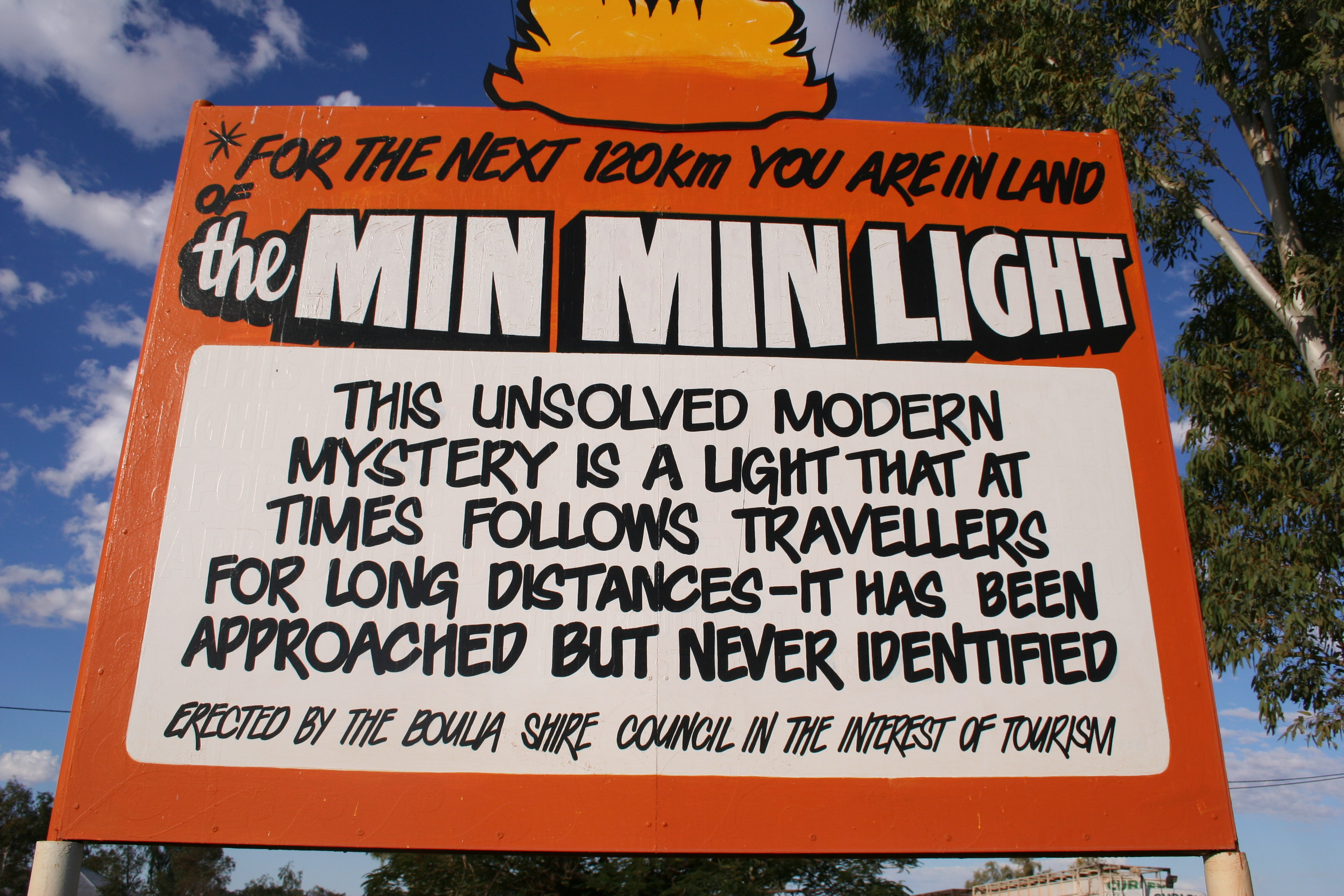
Sign at Boulia, Queensland

The Min Min light is a light phenomenon that has often been reported in outback Australia.

== Appearance and behaviour ==
Accounts of the light appearances vary, though they are most commonly described as being fuzzy, disc-shaped lights that appear to hover just above the horizon. They are often described as being white, though some accounts describe them as changing colour from white to red to green and back again. Some accounts describe them as being dim; others describe them as being bright enough to illuminate the ground under them and to cause nearby objects to throw clearly defined shadows. According to folklore, the lights sometimes follow or approach people and disappear when fired upon, sometimes very rapidly, only to reappear later on, and anyone who chases the lights and catches them will never return to tell the tale. Some witnesses describe the light as appearing to approach them several times before retreating. Others report that the lights were able to keep pace with them when they were in a moving motor vehicle.

== History ==
Stories about the lights can be found in several Aboriginal Australian cultures predating the European colonisation of Australia, and have since become part of wider Australian folklore. Some Indigenous Australians hold that the number of sightings has increased in conjunction with the ingression of Europeans into the outback. While it has been claimed that the first recorded sighting dates to 1838, in the book Six Months in South Australia, it is possible that the event described is a different phenomenon.

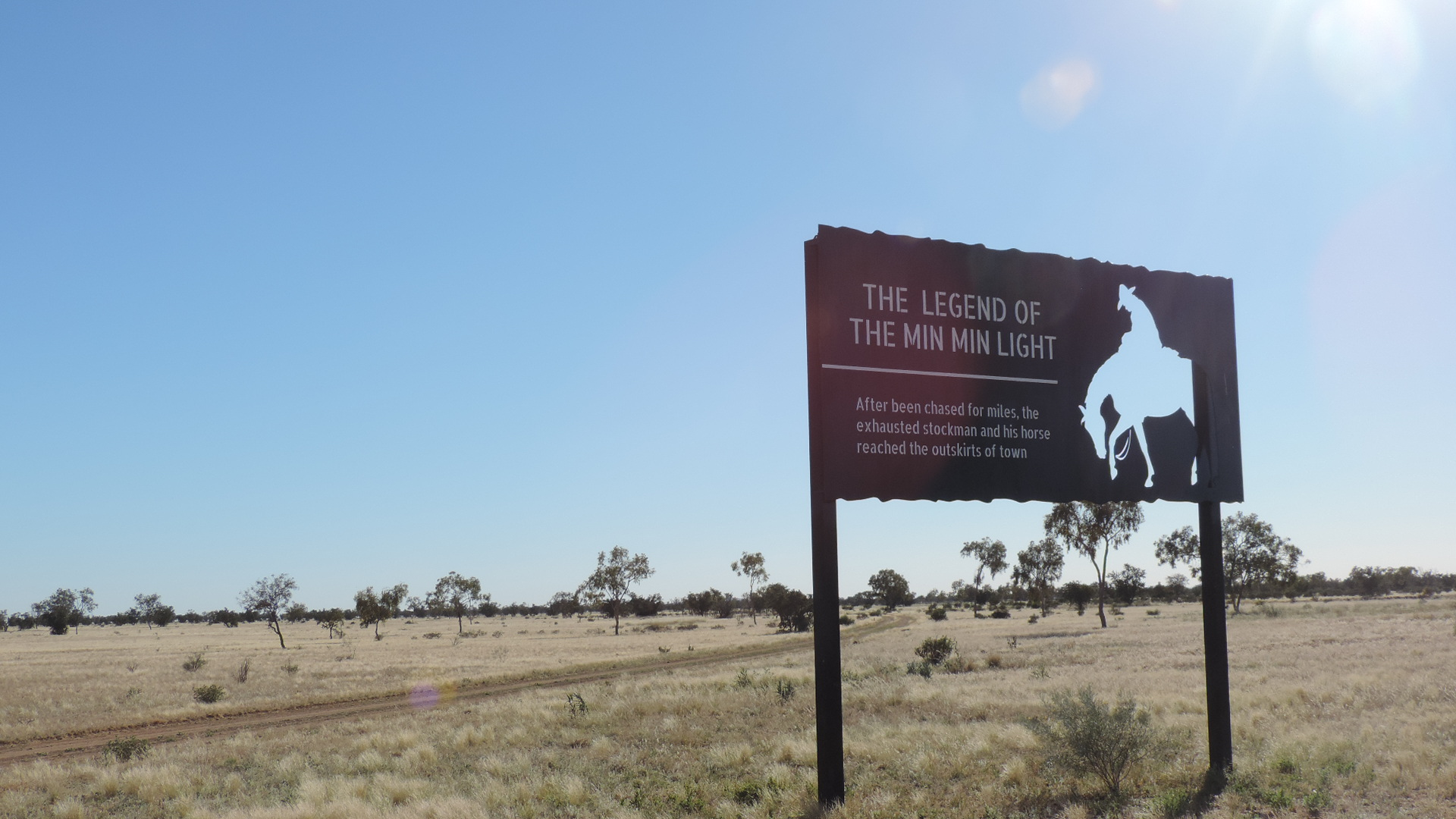
Site of the Min Min Hotel, famous for its connection with the Min Min lights, 2019

The origin of the name Min Min is uncertain. It could be connected to an Australian Aboriginal language from the Cloncurry area, or it could be connected to the Min Min Hotel, located in a small settlement of the same name, where the light was observed by a stockman in 1918. Neither connection has been substantiated. Non-Indigenous folklore and tales of the Min Min lights tend to characterize them as a mysterious phenomenon and fit into understandings of the land which are characterised by the Australian Gothic; Min Min lights are often portrayed as benign, yet frightening and unknowable to those who experience them.

== Distribution ==
Reports of the phenomenon are widespread throughout Australia from as far south as Brewarrina in western New South Wales, to as far north as Boulia in northern Queensland. The majority of sightings are reported to have occurred in Channel Country. Another district where Min Min lights are often reported is Yunta, South Australia, which is centred within a low-lying basin known for recording extreme heat. The Ngarluma people report Min Min lights in the Pilbara region of Western Australia, particularly in an area known as Pyramid Station.

== Hypotheses ==
It is unknown whether the Min Min lights are a real phenomenon, and if so, what their source might be. Various hypotheses have been put forward to explain the lights, including:

=== Bioluminescence ===
Scientist Jack Pettigrew has hypothesized that the lights may be the result of insects swarming that have taken on bioluminescent characteristics after being contaminated by naturally occurring agents found in local fungi, or of species of owl with their own naturally occurring source of bioluminescence. To date, no one has captured or observed an animal with these characteristics. There is also no known bioluminescent source bright enough.

=== Geophysical lights ===
A second hypothesis by Pettigrew is that the lights are the result of known geophysical phenomena, such as piezoelectrics or marsh gas. However, the lights are often reported in areas without geological conditions conducive to these phenomena.

=== Refraction ===
Pettigrew also suggests that the Min Min lights could be a form of Fata Morgana mirage. A Fata Morgana is a specific form of mirage caused by a stark temperature difference between air layers, which causes remote lights or objects actually beyond the horizon to appear visible above the horizon, often with considerable distortion. This explanation would also explain how reports of the sightings have changed over the years: The first reports and Aboriginal legends were of stationary lights, which would have been refractions over the horizon of campfires. Later reports are of lights that actively move. With a Fata Morgana mirage, this would be a refraction of car headlights over the horizon being reflected and being seen to move. The area of the Min Min lights are in a desert with known temperature inversions in the atmosphere.

== See also ==
- Abu Fanous
- Aleya (Ghost light)
- Atmospheric ghost lights
- Aurora
- Ball lightning
- Chir Batti
- Hessdalen lights
- Longdendale lights
- Marfa lights
- The Spooklight
- Unidentified flying object
- Will-o'-the-wisp
