= Light ball =

Light ball may refer to:

- Ball lightning
- Flare
