= Ball lightning =

Atmospheric electrical phenomenon

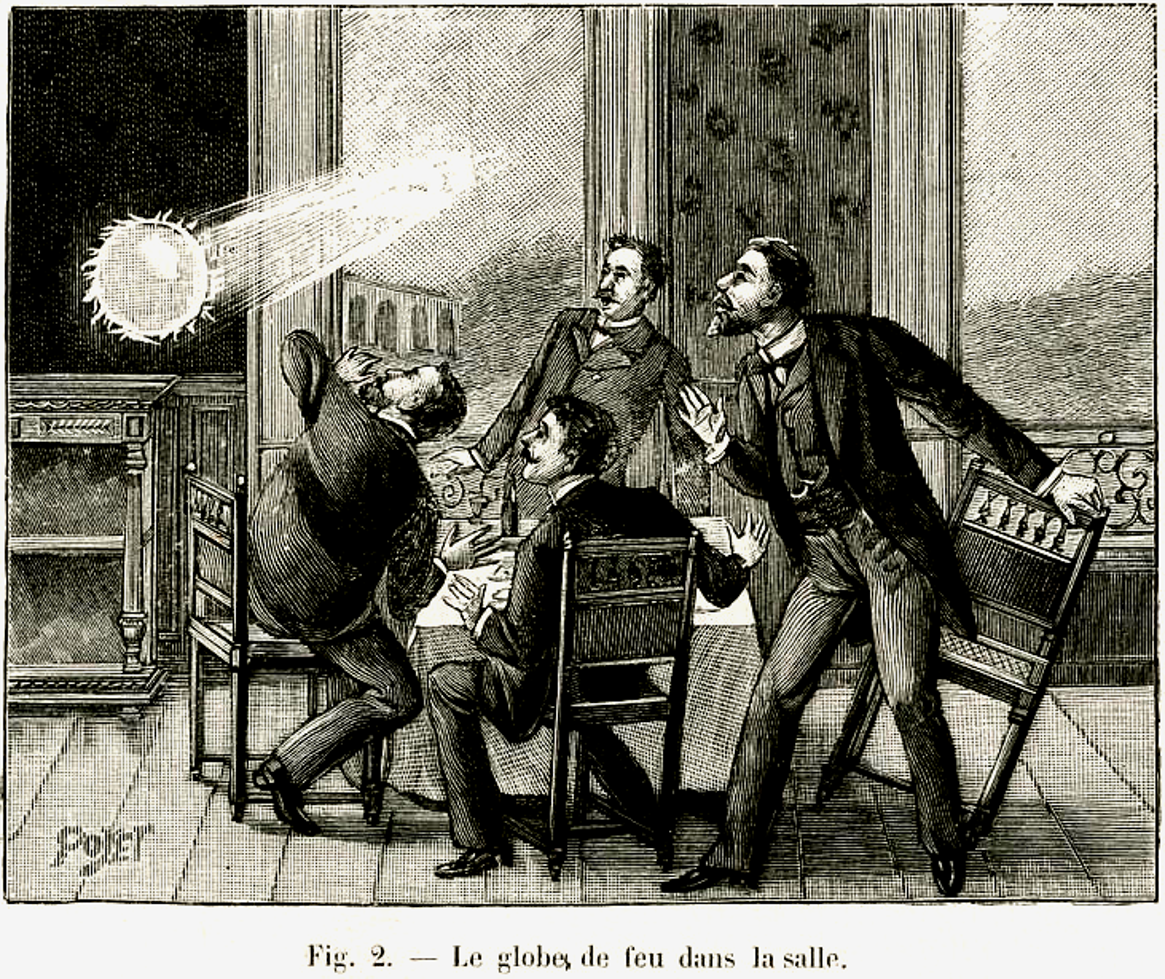
A 1901 depiction of ball lightning

Ball lightning is a rare and unexplained phenomenon described as luminescent spherical objects that vary from pea-sized to several meters (yards) in diameter. Though usually associated with thunderstorms, the observed phenomenon is reported to last considerably longer than the split-second flash of a lightning bolt and is distinct from St. Elmo's fire and will-o'-the-wisp.

Some 20th-century reports describe balls that eventually explode and leave behind an odor of sulfur. Descriptions of ball lightning appear in a variety of accounts over the centuries and have received attention from scientists. An optical spectrum of what appears to have been a ball lightning event was published in January 2014 and included a video at high frame rate. Nevertheless, scientific data on ball lightning remain scarce. Although laboratory experiments have produced effects that are visually similar to reports of ball lightning, how these relate to the phenomenon remains unclear.

== Characteristics ==
Descriptions of ball lightning vary widely. It has been described as moving up and down, sideways or in unpredictable trajectories, hovering and moving with or against the wind; attracted to, unaffected by, or repelled from buildings, people, cars and other objects. Some accounts describe it as moving through solid masses of wood or metal without effect, while others describe it as destructive and melting or burning those substances. Its appearance has also been linked to power lines, altitudes of 300 m (1,000 feet) and higher, and during thunderstorms and calm weather. Ball lightning has been described as transparent, translucent, multicolored, evenly lit, radiating flames, filaments or sparks, with shapes that vary between spheres, ovals, tear-drops, rods, or disks.

Although they are separate and distinct phenomena, ball lightning is often erroneously identified as St. Elmo's fire.

The balls have been reported to disperse in many different ways, such as suddenly vanishing, gradually dissipating, being absorbed into an object, "popping", exploding loudly, or even exploding with force, which is sometimes reported as damaging. Accounts also vary on their alleged danger to humans, from lethal to harmless.

A review of the available literature published in 1972 identified the properties of a "typical" ball lightning, whilst cautioning against overreliance on eye-witness accounts:

- They frequently appear almost simultaneously with cloud-to-ground lightning discharge
- They are generally spherical or pear-shaped with fuzzy edges
- Their diameters range from 1–100 cm (0.4–40 inches), most commonly 10–20 cm (4–8 inches)
- Their brightness corresponds to roughly that of a domestic lamp, so they can be seen clearly in daylight
- A wide range of colors has been observed, with red, orange, and yellow being the most common
- The lifetime of each event is from one second to over a minute with the brightness remaining fairly constant during that time
- They tend to move at a few meters per second, most often in a horizontal direction, but may also move vertically, remain stationary, or wander erratically
- Many are described as having rotational motion
- It is rare that observers report the sensation of heat, although in some cases the disappearance of the ball is accompanied by the liberation of heat
- Some display an affinity for metal objects and may move along conductors such as wires, metal fences, or railroad tracks
- Some appear within buildings passing through closed doors and windows
- Some have appeared within metal aircraft and have entered and left without causing damage
- The disappearance of a ball is generally rapid and may be either silent or explosive
- Odors resembling ozone, burning sulphur, or nitrogen oxides are often reported

== Historical accounts ==
Ball lightning is a possible source of legends that describe luminous balls, such as the mythological Anchimayen from Argentinean and Chilean Mapuche culture.

According to a statistical investigation carried out in 1960, of 1,962 Oak Ridge National Laboratory monthly role personnel, and of all 15,923 Union Carbide Nuclear Company personnel in Oak Ridge, found 5.6% and 3.1% respectively reported seeing ball lightning. A Scientific American article summarized the study as having found that ball lightning had been seen by 5% of the population of the Earth. Another study analyzed reports of more than 2,000 cases.

=== Gervase of Canterbury ===
The chronicle of Gervase of Canterbury, an English monk, contains what is possibly the earliest known reference to ball lightning, dated 7 June 1195. He states, "A marvellous sign descended near London", consisting of a dense and dark cloud, emitting a white substance that grew into a spherical shape under the cloud, from which a fiery globe fell towards the river.

Physicist Emeritus Professor Brian Tanner and historian Giles Gasper of Durham University identified the chronicle entry as probably describing ball lightning, and noted its similarity to other accounts:

Gervase's description of a white substance coming out of the dark cloud, falling as a spinning fiery sphere and then having some horizontal motion is very similar to historic and contemporary descriptions of ball lightning ... It is fascinating to see how closely Gervase's 12th century description matches modern reports of ball lightning.

=== Great Thunderstorm of Widecombe-in-the-Moor ===
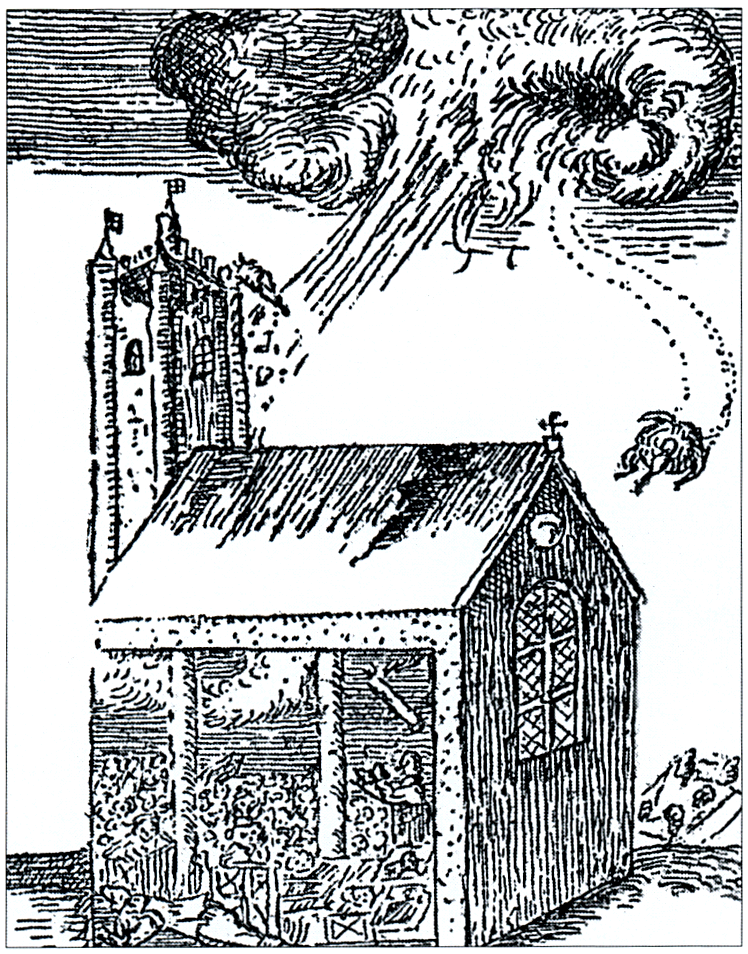
Contemporary woodcut of the Widecombe-in-the-Moor storm

One early account reports on the Great Thunderstorm at a church in Widecombe-in-the-Moor, Devon, in England, on 21 October 1638. Four people died and approximately 60 suffered injuries during a severe storm. Witnesses described an 8-foot (2.4 m) ball of fire striking and entering the church, nearly destroying it. Large stones from the church walls were hurled onto the ground and through large wooden beams. The ball of fire allegedly smashed the pews and many windows, and filled the church with a foul sulfurous odor and dark, thick smoke.

The ball of fire reportedly divided into two segments, one exiting through a window by smashing it open, the other disappearing somewhere inside the church. Because of the fire and sulphur smell, contemporaries explained the ball of fire as "the devil" or as the "flames of hell". Later, some blamed the entire incident on two people who had been playing cards in the pews during the sermon, thereby incurring God's wrath.

=== The sloop Catherine and Mary ===
In December 1726, a number of British newspapers printed an extract of a letter from John Howell of the sloop Catherine and Mary:

As we were coming thro' the Gulf of Florida on 29th of August, a large ball of fire fell from the Element and split our mast in Ten Thousand Pieces, if it were possible; split our Main Beam, also Three Planks of the Side, Under Water, and Three of the Deck; killed one man, another had his Hand carried of [sic], and had it not been for the violent rains, our Sails would have been of a Blast of Fire.

=== HMS Montague ===
One particularly large example was reported "on the authority of Dr. Gregory" in 1749:

Admiral Chambers on board the HMS Montague, 4 November 1749, was taking an observation just before noon ... he observed a large ball of blue fire about three miles [5 km] distant from them. They immediately lowered their topsails, but it came up so fast upon them, that, before they could raise the main tack, they observed the ball rise almost perpendicularly, and not above forty or fifty yards [35 or 45 m] from the main chains when it went off with an explosion, as great as if a hundred cannons had been discharged at the same time, leaving behind it a strong sulfurous smell. By this explosion the main top-mast was shattered into pieces and the main mast went down to the keel.

Five men were knocked down and one of them very bruised. Just before the explosion, the ball seemed to be the size of a large mill-stone.

=== Georg Richmann ===
A 1753 report recounts lethal ball lightning when professor Georg Richmann of Saint Petersburg, Russia, constructed a kite-flying apparatus similar to Benjamin Franklin's proposal a year earlier. Richmann was attending a meeting of the Academy of Sciences when he heard thunder and ran home with his engraver to capture the event for posterity. While the experiment was under way, ball lightning appeared, travelled down the string, struck Richmann's forehead and killed him. The ball had left a red spot on Richmann's forehead, his shoes were blown open, and his clothing was singed. His engraver was knocked unconscious. The door-frame of the room was split and the door was torn from its hinges.

=== HMS Warren Hastings ===
An English journal reported that during an 1809 storm, three "balls of fire" appeared and "attacked" the British ship HMS Warren Hastings. The crew watched one ball descend, killing a man on deck and setting the main mast on fire. A crewman went out to retrieve the fallen body and was struck by a second ball, which knocked him back and left him with mild burns. A third man was killed by contact with the third ball. Crew members reported a persistent, sickening sulphur smell afterward.

=== Ebenezer Cobham Brewer ===
Ebenezer Cobham Brewer, in his 1864 US edition of A Guide to the Scientific Knowledge of Things Familiar, discusses "globular lightning". He describes it as slow-moving balls of fire or explosive gas that sometimes fall to the earth or run along the ground during a thunderstorm. He said that the balls sometimes split into smaller balls and may explode "like a cannon".

=== Wilfrid de Fonvielle ===
In his book Thunder and Lightning, translated into English in 1875, French science-writer Wilfrid de Fonvielle wrote that there had been about 150 reports of globular lightning:

Globular lightning seems to be particularly attracted to metals; thus it will seek the railings of balconies, or else water or gas pipes etc., It has no peculiar tint of its own but will appear of any colour as the case may be ... at Coethen in the Duchy of Anhalt it appeared green. M. Colon, Vice-President of the Geological Society of Paris, saw a ball of lightning descend slowly from the sky along the bark of a poplar tree; as soon as it touched the earth it bounced up again, and disappeared without exploding. On 10th of September 1845 a ball of lightning entered the kitchen of a house in the village of Salagnac in the valley of Correze. This ball rolled across without doing any harm to two women and a young man who were here; but on getting into an adjoining stable it exploded and killed a pig which happened to be shut up there, and which, knowing nothing about the wonders of thunder and lightning, dared to smell it in the most rude and unbecoming manner.

The motion of such balls is far from being very rapid – they have even been observed occasionally to pause in their course, but they are not the less destructive for all that. A ball of lightning which entered the church of Stralsund, on exploding, projected a number of balls which exploded in their turn like shells.

=== Tsar Nicholas II ===
Nicholas II, the final tsar of the Russian Empire, reported witnessing a fiery ball as a child attending church in the company of his grandfather Alexander II.

Once my parents were away, and I was at the all-night vigil with my grandfather in the small church in Alexandria. During the service there was a powerful thunderstorm, streaks of lightning flashed one after the other, and it seemed as if the peals of thunder would shake even the church and the whole world to its foundations. Suddenly it became quite dark, a blast of wind from the open door blew out the flame of the candles which were lit in front of the iconostasis, there was a long clap of thunder, louder than before, and I suddenly saw a fiery ball flying from the window straight towards the head of the Emperor. The ball (it was of lightning) whirled around the floor, then passed the chandelier and flew out through the door into the park. My heart froze, I glanced at my grandfather – his face was completely calm. He crossed himself just as calmly as he had when the fiery ball had flown near us, and I felt that it was unseemly and not courageous to be frightened as I was. I felt that one had only to look at what was happening and believe in the mercy of God, as he, my grandfather, did. After the ball had passed through the whole church, and suddenly gone out through the door, I again looked at my grandfather. A faint smile was on his face, and he nodded his head at me. My panic disappeared, and from that time I had no more fear of storms.

=== Aleister Crowley ===
British occultist Aleister Crowley reported witnessing what he referred to as "globular electricity" during a thunderstorm on Lake Pasquaney in New Hampshire, United States, in 1916. He was sheltered in a small cottage when he, in his own words,

noticed, with what I can only describe as calm amazement, that a dazzling globe of electric fire, apparently between six and twelve inches [15 and 30 cm] in diameter, was stationary about six inches [15 cm] below and to the right of my right knee. As I looked at it, it exploded with a sharp report quite impossible to confuse with the continuous turmoil of the lightning, thunder and hail, or that of the lashed water and smashed wood which was creating a pandemonium outside the cottage. I felt a very slight shock in the middle of my right hand, which was closer to the globe than any other part of my body.

=== Roger Clifton Jennison ===
Jennison, of the Electronics Laboratory at the University of Kent, described his own observation of ball lightning in an article published in Nature in 1969:

I was seated near the front of the passenger cabin of an all-metal airliner (Eastern Airlines Flight EA 539) on a late night flight from New York to Washington. The aircraft encountered an electrical storm during which it was enveloped in a sudden bright and loud electrical discharge (0005 h EST, March 19, 1963). Some seconds after this a glowing sphere a little more than 20 cm [8 inches] in diameter emerged from the pilot's cabin and passed down the aisle of the aircraft approximately 50 cm [20 inches] from me, maintaining the same height and course for the whole distance over which it could be observed.

=== Other accounts ===
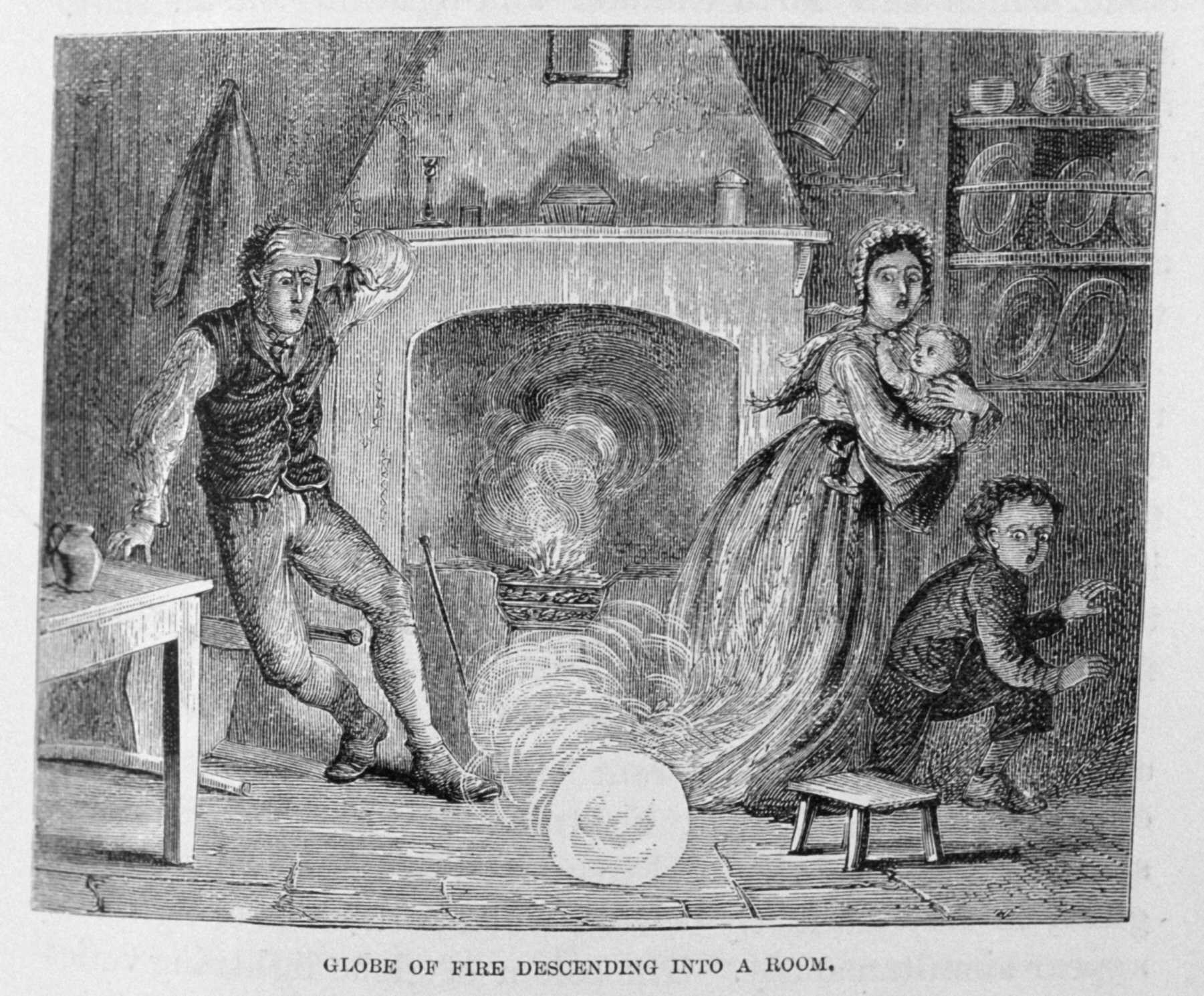
Ball lightning entering via the chimney (1886)

- Willy Ley discussed a sighting in Paris on 5 July 1852 "for which sworn statements were filed with the French Academy of Sciences". During a thunderstorm, a tailor living next to Church of the Val-de-Grâce saw a ball the size of a human head come out of the fireplace. It flew around the room, reentered the fireplace, and exploded in and destroyed the top of the chimney.
- On 30 April 1877, a ball of lightning entered the Golden Temple at Amritsar, India, and exited through a side door. Several people observed the ball, and the incident is inscribed on the front wall of Darshani Deori.
- On 22 November 1894, an unusually prolonged instance of natural ball lightning occurred in Golden, Colorado, which suggests it could be artificially induced from the atmosphere. The Golden Globe newspaper reported:
  A beautiful yet strange phenomenon was seen in this city on last Monday night. The wind was high and the air seemed to be full of electricity. In front of, above and around the new Hall of Engineering of the School of Mines, balls of fire played tag for half an hour, to the wonder and amazement of all who saw the display. In this building is situated the dynamos and electrical apparatus of perhaps the finest electrical plant of its size in the state. There was probably a visiting delegation from the clouds, to the captives of the dynamos on last Monday night, and they certainly had a fine visit and a roystering game of romp.
- On 22 May 1901, in the Kazakh city of Uralsk in the Russian Empire (now Oral, Kazakhstan), "a dazzlingly brilliant ball of fire" descended gradually from the sky during a thunderstorm, then entered into a house where 21 people had taken refuge, "wreaked havoc with the apartment, broke through the wall into a stove in the adjoining room, smashed the stove-pipe, and carried it off with such violence that it was dashed against the opposite wall, and went out through the broken window". The incident was reported in the Bulletin de la Société astronomique de France the following year.
- In July 1907, ball lightning hit the Cape Naturaliste Lighthouse in Western Australia. Lighthouse-keeper Patrick Baird was in the tower at the time and was knocked unconscious. His daughter Ethel recorded the event.
- Ley discussed another incident in Bischofswerda, Germany. On 29 April 1925, multiple witnesses saw a silent ball land near a mailman, move along a telephone wire to a school, knock back a teacher using a telephone, and bore perfectly round coin-sized holes through a glass pane. 210 m (700 feet) of wire was melted, several telephone poles were damaged, an underground cable was broken, and several workmen were thrown to the ground but unhurt.
- An early reference to ball lightning appears in a children's book set in the 19th century by Laura Ingalls Wilder. The books are considered historical fiction, but the author always insisted they were descriptive of actual events in her life. In Wilder's description, three separate balls of lightning appear during a winter blizzard near a cast-iron stove in the family's kitchen. They are described as appearing near the stovepipe, then rolling across the floor, only to disappear as the mother (Caroline Ingalls) chases them with a willow-branch broom.
- Pilots in World War II (1939–1945) described an unusual phenomenon for which ball lightning has been suggested as an explanation. The pilots saw small balls of light moving in strange trajectories, which came to be referred to as foo fighters.
- On 6 August 1994, a ball lightning is believed to have gone through a closed window in Uppsala, Sweden, leaving a circular hole about 5 cm (2 inches) in diameter. The hole in the window was found days later, and it was thought it could have happened during the thunderstorm; a lightning strike was witnessed by residents in the area, and was recorded by a lightning strike tracking system at the Division for Electricity and Lightning Research at Uppsala University.
- In 2005, an incident occurred in Guernsey, where an apparent lightning-strike on an aircraft led to multiple fireball sightings on the ground.
- On 10 July 2011, during a powerful thunderstorm, a ball of light with a two-metre (6 ft 7 in) tail went through a window to the control room of local emergency services in Liberec in the Czech Republic. The ball bounced from window to ceiling, then to the floor and back, where it rolled along it for two or three meters. It then dropped to the floor and disappeared. The staff present in the control room were frightened, smelled electricity and burned cables and thought something was burning. The computers froze (not crashed) and all communications equipment was knocked out for the night until restored by technicians. Aside from damages caused by disrupting equipment, only one computer monitor was destroyed.
- On 15 December 2014, Loganair Flight 6780 in Scotland experienced ball lightning in the forward cabin just before lightning struck the aircraft nose. Due to subsequent confusion related to the autopilot, the plane fell several thousand feet and came within 340 m (1,100 feet) of the North Sea before recovering and making an emergency landing at Aberdeen Airport.
- On 24 June 2022, in a massive thunderstorm front, a retiree at Liebenberg, Lower Austria, saw blinding cloud-to-ground lightning to the northeast and within one minute spotted a yellowish "burning object with licking flames" that followed a wavy trajectory along the local road about 15 m (49 feet) over ground and was lost from sight after two seconds. It occurred at the end of a local thunderstorm cell. The European Severe Storms Laboratory recorded this as ball lightning.
- On 3 July 2025, following a rainstorm in Rich Valley, Alberta, a couple witnessed a lightning strike near their home and a pale blue "ball of fire" that hovered at an approximate height of 7 m (23 feet) above the ground, and moved slowly with an 'oscillating' quality for about 20 seconds before disappearing from view. The phenomenon was recorded by the couple and reported upon by news agencies.

== Direct measurements of natural ball lightning ==
The emission spectrum (intensity vs. wavelength) of a natural ball lightning

In January 2014, scientists from Northwest Normal University in Lanzhou, China, published the results of recordings made in July 2012 of the optical spectrum of what was thought to be natural ball lightning made by chance during the study of ordinary cloud–ground lightning on the Tibetan Plateau. At a distance of 900 m (3,000 ft), a total of 1.64 seconds of digital video of the ball lightning and its spectrum was made, from the formation of the ball lightning after the ordinary lightning struck the ground, up to the optical decay of the phenomenon. Additional video was recorded by a high-speed (3000 frames/sec) camera, which captured only the last 0.78 seconds of the event, due to its limited recording capacity. Both cameras were equipped with slitless spectrographs. The researchers detected emission lines of neutral atomic silicon, calcium, iron, nitrogen, and oxygen—in contrast with mainly ionized nitrogen emission lines in the spectrum of the parent lightning. The ball lightning traveled horizontally across the video frame at an average speed equivalent of 8.6 m/s (28 ft/s). It had a diameter of 5 m (16 ft) and covered a distance of about 15 m (49 ft) within those 1.64 s.

Oscillations in the light intensity and in the oxygen and nitrogen emission at a frequency of 100 hertz, possibly caused by the electromagnetic field of the 50 Hz high-voltage power transmission line in the vicinity, were observed. From the spectrum, the temperature of the ball lightning was assessed as being lower than the temperature of the parent lightning (<15,000 to 30,000 K). The observed data are consistent with vaporization of soil as well as with ball lightning's sensitivity to electric fields.

== Laboratory experiments ==
Scientists have long attempted to produce ball lightning in laboratory experiments. While some experiments have produced effects that are visually similar to reports of natural ball lightning, it has not yet been determined whether there is any relation.

Nikola Tesla reportedly could artificially produce 1.5-inch (3.8 cm) balls and conducted some demonstrations of his ability. Tesla was more interested in higher voltages and powers as well as remote transmission of power; the balls he made were just a curiosity.

=== ICBL ===
The International Committee on Ball Lightning (ICBL) held regular International Symposium on Ball Lightning (ISBL) on the subject, since the First International Symposium on Ball Lightning at Waseda University, Tokyo on 4-6 July 1988. Title from a related group uses the generic name "Unconventional Plasmas". The 11th International Symposium on Ball Lightning, was at Kaliningrad, 21-27 June 2010. The 12th ICBL symposium was tentatively scheduled for July 2012 in San Marcos, Texas but was cancelled due to a lack of submitted abstracts.

=== Wave-guided microwaves ===
Ohtsuki and Ofuruton described producing "plasma fireballs" by microwave interference within an air-filled cylindrical cavity fed by a rectangular waveguide using a 2.45 GHz, 5 kW (maximum power) microwave oscillator.

=== Water discharge experiments ===
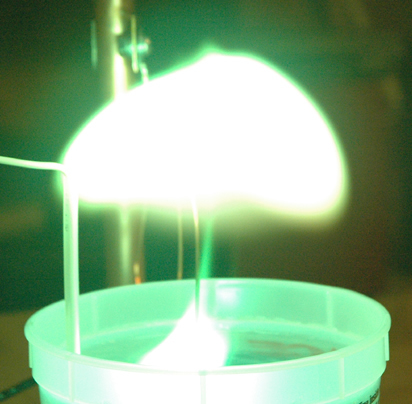
A demonstration of the water discharge experiment

Some scientific groups, including the Max Planck Institute, have reportedly produced a ball lightning-type effect by discharging a high-voltage capacitor in a tank of water.

=== Home microwave oven experiments ===
Many modern experiments involve using a microwave oven to produce small rising glowing balls, often referred to as plasma balls. Generally, the experiments are conducted by placing a lit or recently extinguished match or other small object in a microwave oven. The burnt portion of the object flares up into a large ball of fire, while "plasma balls" float near the oven chamber ceiling. Some experiments describe covering the match with an inverted glass jar, which contains both the flame and the balls so that they do not damage the chamber walls. (A glass jar, however, eventually explodes rather than simply causing charred paint or melting metal, as happens to the inside of a microwave.) Experiments by Eli Jerby and Vladimir Dikhtyar in Israel revealed that microwave plasma balls are made up of nanoparticles with an average radius of 25 nm (9.8×10^{−7} inches). The team demonstrated the phenomenon with copper, salts, water and carbon.

=== Silicon experiments ===
Experiments in 2007 involved shocking silicon wafers with electricity, which vaporizes the silicon and induces oxidation in the vapors. The visual effect can be described as small glowing, sparkling orbs that roll around a surface. Two Brazilian scientists, Antonio Pavão and Gerson Paiva of the Federal University of Pernambuco have reportedly consistently made small long-lasting balls using this method. These experiments stemmed from the theory that ball lightning is actually oxidized silicon vapors (see vaporized silicon hypothesis, below).

=== Short interval lab created ball lightning analogues ===
==== Stable plasma toroid model ====
Although lasting only about 200 milliseconds in a partial atmosphere, the spinning plasma toroid has the appearance of ball lightning, based on observations, computer simulations, and mathematical equations. Spinning plasma toroids can be created by means of high power electric arcs, which may explain ball lightning observations after lightning bolts.

==== Atmospheric plasmoids above a water surface ====
Atmospheric plasmoids lasting up to only 350 microseconds in the visible spectral range (UV-NIR) were created by means of high-voltage discharge above a water surface.

== Proposed scientific explanations ==
There is at present no widely accepted explanation for ball lightning. Several hypotheses have been advanced since the phenomenon was brought into the scientific realm by the English physician and electrical researcher William Snow Harris in 1843, and French Academy scientist François Arago in 1855.

=== Vaporized silicon hypothesis ===
This hypothesis suggests that ball lightning consists of vaporized silicon burning through oxidation. Lightning striking Earth's soil could vaporize the silica contained within it, and somehow separate the oxygen from the silicon dioxide, turning it into pure silicon vapor. As it cools, the silicon could condense into a floating aerosol, bound by its charge, glowing due to the heat of silicon recombining with oxygen. An experimental investigation of this effect, published in 2007, reported producing "luminous balls with lifetime in the order of seconds" by evaporating pure silicon with an electric arc. Videos and spectrographs of this experiment have been made available. This hypothesis got significant supportive data in 2014, when the first ever recorded spectra of natural ball lightning were published. The theorized forms of silicon storage in soil include nanoparticles of Si, SiO, and SiC. Matthew Francis has dubbed this the "dirt clod hypothesis", in which the spectrum of ball lightning shows that it shares chemistry with soil.

=== Electrically charged solid-core model ===
In this model, ball lightning is assumed to have a solid, positively charged core. According to this underlying assumption, the core is surrounded by a thin electron layer with a charge nearly equal in magnitude to that of the core. A vacuum exists between the core and the electron layer containing an intense electromagnetic (EM) field, which is reflected and guided by the electron layer. The microwave EM field applies a ponderomotive force (radiation pressure) to the electrons preventing them from falling into the core.

=== Microwave cavity hypothesis ===
Pyotr Kapitsa proposed that ball lightning is a glow discharge driven by microwave radiation that is guided to the ball along lines of ionized air from lightning clouds where it is produced. The ball serves as a resonant microwave cavity, automatically adjusting its radius to the wavelength of the microwave radiation so that resonance is maintained.

The Handel Maser-Soliton theory of ball lightning hypothesizes that the energy source generating the ball lightning is a large (several cubic kilometers) atmospheric maser. The ball lightning appears as a plasma caviton at the antinodal plane of the microwave radiation from the maser.

In 2017, Researchers from Zhejiang University in Hangzhou, China, proposed that the bright glow of lightning balls is created when microwaves become trapped inside a plasma bubble. At the tip of a lightning strike reaching the ground, a relativistic electron bunch can be produced when in contact with microwave radiation, the latter ionizes the local air and the radiation pressure evacuates the resulting plasma, forming a spherical plasma bubble that stably traps the radiation. Microwaves trapped inside the ball continue to generate plasma for a moment to maintain the bright flashes described in observer accounts. The ball eventually fades as the radiation held within the bubble starts to decay and microwaves are discharged from the sphere. The lightning balls can dramatically explode as the structure destabilizes. The theory could explain many of the strange characteristics of ball lightning. For instance, microwaves are able to pass through glass, which helps to explain why balls could be formed indoors.

=== Soliton hypothesis ===
Julio Rubinstein, David Finkelstein, and James R. Powell proposed that ball lightning is a detached St. Elmo's fire (1964–1970). St. Elmo's fire arises when a sharp conductor, such as a ship's mast, amplifies the atmospheric electric field to breakdown. For a globe the amplification factor is 3. A free ball of ionized air can amplify the ambient field this much by its own conductivity. When this maintains the ionization, the ball is then a soliton in the flow of atmospheric electricity.

Powell's kinetic theory calculation found that the ball size is set by the second Townsend coefficient (the mean free path of conduction electrons) near breakdown. Wandering glow discharges are found to occur within certain industrial microwave ovens and continue to glow for several seconds after power is shut off. Arcs drawn from high-power low-voltage microwave generators also are found to exhibit afterglow. Powell measured their spectra, and found that the after-glow comes mostly from metastable NO ions, which are long-lived at low temperatures. It occurred in air and in nitrous oxide, which possess such metastable ions, and not in atmospheres of argon, carbon dioxide, or helium, which do not.

The soliton model of a ball lightning was further developed. It was suggested that an instance of ball lightning is based on spherically symmetric nonlinear oscillations of charged particles in plasma – the analogue of a spatial Langmuir soliton. These oscillations were described in both classical and quantum approaches. It was found that the most intense plasma oscillations occur in the central regions of a ball lightning. It is suggested that bound states of radially oscillating charged particles with oppositely oriented spins – the analogue of Cooper pairs – can appear inside a ball lightning. This phenomenon, in its turn, can lead to a superconducting phase in a ball lightning. The idea of the superconductivity in a ball lightning was considered earlier. The possibility of the existence of a ball lightning with a composite core was also discussed in this model.

=== Hydrodynamic vortex ring antisymmetry ===
One theory that may account for the wide spectrum of observational evidence is the idea of combustion inside the low-velocity region of spherical vortex breakdown of a natural vortex (e.g., the 'Hill's spherical vortex').

=== Nanobattery hypothesis ===
Oleg Meshcheryakov suggests that ball lightning is made of composite nano or submicrometer particles—each particle constituting a battery. A surface discharge shorts these batteries, causing a current that forms the ball. His model is described as an aerosol model that explains all the observable properties and processes of ball lightning.

=== Buoyant plasma hypothesis ===
The declassified Project Condign report concludes that buoyant charged plasma formations similar to ball lightning are formed by novel physical, electrical, and magnetic phenomena, and that these charged plasmas are capable of being transported at enormous speeds under the influence and balance of electrical charges in the atmosphere. These plasmas appear to originate due to more than one set of weather and electrically charged conditions, the scientific rationale for which is incomplete or not fully understood. One suggestion is that meteoroids breaking up in the atmosphere and forming charged plasmas as opposed to burning completely or impacting as meteorites could explain some instances of the phenomena, in addition to other unknown atmospheric events. However, according to Stenhoff, this explanation is considered insufficient to explain the ball lightning phenomenon, and would likely not withstand peer review.

=== Hallucinations induced by magnetic field ===
Cooray and Cooray (2008) stated that the features of hallucinations experienced by patients having epileptic seizures in the occipital lobe are similar to the observed features of ball lightning. The study also showed that the rapidly changing magnetic field of a close lightning flash is strong enough to excite the neurons in the brain. This strengthens the possibility of lightning-induced seizure in the occipital lobe of a person close to a lightning strike, establishing the connection between epileptic hallucination mimicking ball lightning and thunderstorms.

More recent research with transcranial magnetic stimulation has been shown to give the same hallucination results in the laboratory (termed magnetophosphenes), and these conditions have been shown to occur in nature near lightning strikes. This hypothesis fails to explain observed physical damage caused by ball lightning or simultaneous observation by multiple witnesses. (At the very least, observations would differ substantially.)

Theoretical calculations from University of Innsbruck researchers suggest that the magnetic fields involved in certain types of lightning strikes could potentially induce visual hallucinations resembling ball lightning. Such fields, which are found within close distances to a point in which multiple lightning strikes have occurred over a few seconds, can directly cause the neurons in the visual cortex to fire, resulting in magnetophosphenes (magnetically induced visual hallucinations).

=== Rydberg matter concept ===
Manykin et al. have suggested atmospheric Rydberg matter as an explanation of ball lightning phenomena. Rydberg matter is a condensed form of highly excited atoms in many aspects similar to electron-hole droplets in semiconductors. However, in contrast to electron-hole droplets, Rydberg matter has an extended life-time—as long as hours. This condensed excited state of matter is supported by experiments, mainly of a group led by Holmlid. It is similar to a liquid or solid state of matter with extremely low (gas-like) density. Lumps of atmospheric Rydberg matter can result from condensation of highly excited atoms that form by atmospheric electrical phenomena, mainly from linear lightning. Stimulated decay of Rydberg matter clouds can, however, take the form of an avalanche, and so appear as an explosion.

=== Vacuum hypothesis ===
In December 1899, Nikola Tesla theorized that the balls consisted of a highly rarefied hot gas.

=== Electron-ion model ===
Fedosin presented a model in which charged ions are located inside the ball lightning, and electrons rotate in the shell, creating a magnetic field.

The long-term stability of ball lightning is ensured by the balance of electric and magnetic forces. The electric force acting on the electrons from the positive volume charge of the ions is the centripetal force that holds the electrons in place as they rotate. In turn, the ions are held by the magnetic field, which causes them to rotate around the magnetic field lines. The model predicts a maximum diameter of 34 cm for ball lightning, with the lightning having a charge of about 10 microcoulombs and being positively charged, and the energy of the lightning reaching 11 kilojoules.

The electron-ion model describes not only ball lightning, but also bead lightning, which usually occurs when linear lightning disintegrates. Based on the known dimensions of the beads of bead lightning, it is possible to calculate the electric charge of a single bead and its magnetic field. The electric forces of repulsion of neighboring beads are balanced by the magnetic forces of their attraction. Since the electromagnetic forces between the beads significantly exceed the force of the wind pressure, the beads remain in their places until the moment of extinction of the bead lightning.

=== Electrochemical model ===
In the electrochemical model (based on work by Stakhanov and later modified by Turner), a lightning ball is an air plasma surrounded by several chemically active layers. It is fueled by nitrogen oxidation producing the ions H_{3}O^{+} and NO_{2}^{−}. On hydration, these ions can combine, refrigerating the plasma surface. The aerosols of nitrous acid so produced are then further oxidized to nitric acid. They grow in size and restrict the inflow of air, thus holding the plasma together.

These processes require very delicately balanced chemical and electrical conditions in the surrounding air which explains the rarity of the phenomenon. With optimal reaction conditions, the weight of the droplets formed can more than offset the buoyancy force of the hot plasma. At the same time, the net positive charges, both on the outside of the ball and on the Earth's surface (during a thunderstorm), can sometimes balance the ball in the air a meter or less above the ground.

Ball movement can be driven by electrical fields but also, since the air in-flow is restricted by the number and mean diameter of the surface particles, it will respond to local humidity differences. Furthermore, the air in-flow provides a very effective surface tension to the ball. This explains such apparently anomalous behaviors as squeezing through relatively small holes and bouncing. In its final form, the model can explain all the known characteristics of ball lightning. Thermodynamic considerations refute the fallacy that rapid charge neutralisation precludes ball lightning from being a plasma.

=== Other hypotheses ===
Several other hypotheses have been proposed to explain ball lightning:

- Spinning electric dipole hypothesis. A 1976 article by V. G. Endean postulated that ball lightning could be described as an electric field vector spinning in the microwave frequency region.
- Electrostatic Leyden jar models. Stanley Singer discussed (1971) this type of hypothesis and suggested that the electrical recombination time would be too short for the ball lightning lifetimes often reported.
- Smirnov proposed (1987) a fractal aerogel hypothesis.
- M. I. Zelikin proposed (2006) an explanation (with a rigorous mathematical foundation) based on the hypothesis of plasma superconductivity (see also).
- A. Meessen presented a theory at the 10th International Symposium on Ball Lightning (21–27 June 2010, Kaliningrad, Russia) explaining all known properties of ball lightning in terms of collective oscillations of free electrons. The simplest case corresponds to radial oscillations in a spherical plasma membrane. These oscillations are sustained by parametric amplification, resulting from regular "inhalation" of charged particles that are present at lower densities in the ambient air. Ball lightning vanishes thus by silent extinction when the available density of charged particles is too low, while it disappears with a loud and sometimes very violent explosion when this density is too high. Electronic oscillations are also possible as stationary waves in a plasma ball or thick plasma membrane. This yields concentric luminous bubbles.

== See also ==
- Antimatter comet – Hypothetical object
- Atmospheric ghost lights – Lights that appear in the atmosphere without an obvious cause
- Brown Mountain Lights – Purported ghost lights near Brown Mountain, North Carolina
- Earthquake light – Reported luminous phenomenon associated with earthquakes
- Hitodama – Floating balls of fire in Japanese folklore
- List of lightning phenomena
- Mãe-do-Ouro – Brazilian mythological figure
- Marfa lights – Atmospheric light phenomenon in Texas
- Naga fireball – Atmospheric phenomenon on the Mekong River
- Plasmoid – Plasma and magnetic field structure
- Shiranui – Atmospheric ghost light
- Spontaneous human combustion – Allegedly unexplained human incineration
- Sprite (lightning) – Electrical discharges above thunderstorm clouds
- Will-o'-the-wisp – Atmospheric ghost lights
