= Workplace safety standards =

Standards to reduce occupational risk

Workplace safety standards are sets of standards developed with the goal of reducing risk from occupational hazards.

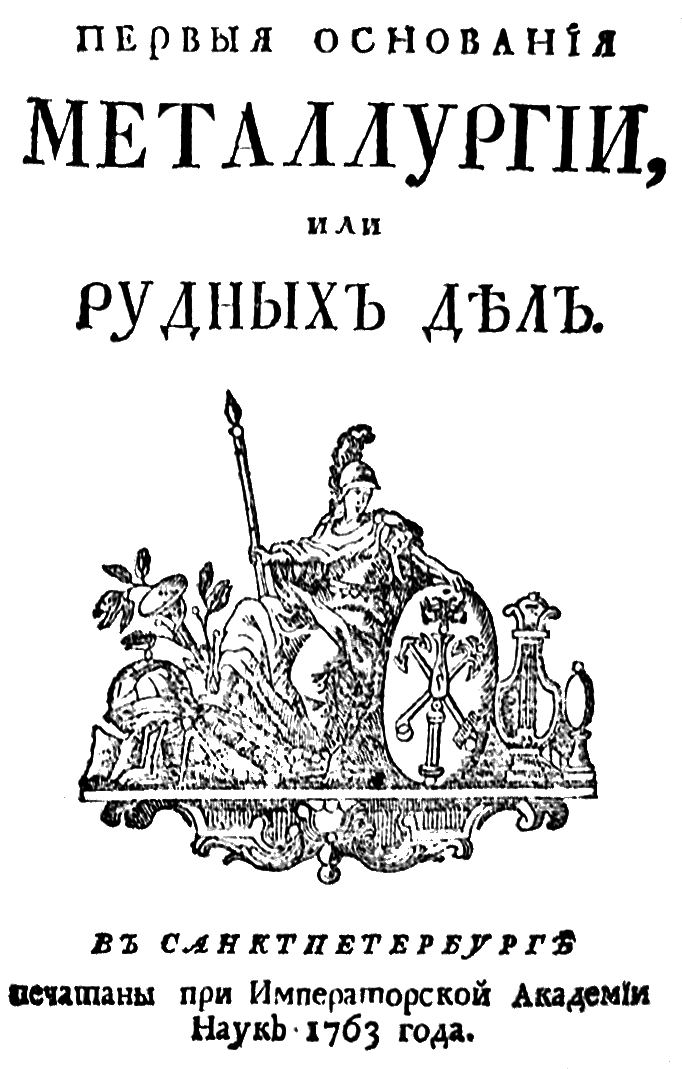
The First Foundations of Metallurgy, or Ore Affairs

== History ==
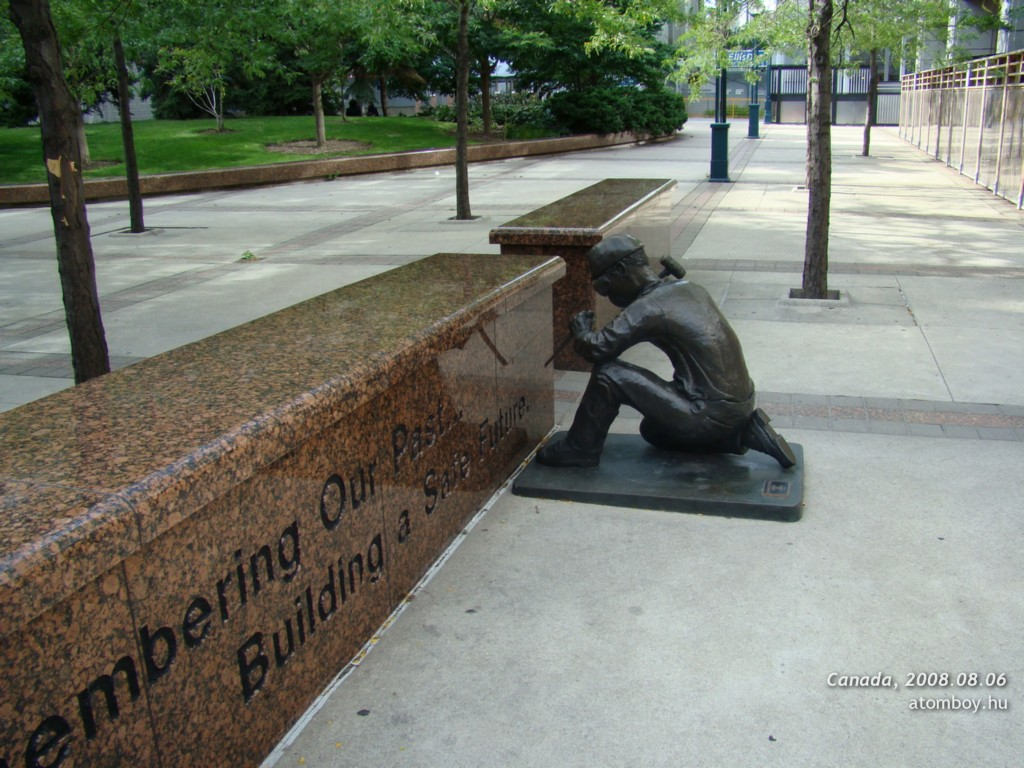
Simcoe Park Workers Monument

The Russian scientist Mikhail Lomonosov in 1763 first describes the dangers of mining in his book The First Foundations of Metallurgy, or Ore Affairs (Russian: Первыя основанiя Металлургiи, или Рудныхъ Делъ). The history of human safety in the workplace began in 1802 with the Health and Morals of Apprentices Act. In 1893 in the United States, Railroad Safety Appliance Act was formed. In 1911 were introduced Coal Mines Act. In 1947, the General Agreement on Tariffs and Trade (GATT) was signed and published by a collaborative group of 23 countries working to establish smooth international trade. In the United States the first Federal Safety Standards for cars become effective 1 January 1968. These new standards help protect drivers against unreasonable risk of crashes occurring as a result of the design, construction or performance of motor vehicles. In 2015 was created EFM scientist against EMF radiation. On 11 May 2015, Dr. Martin Blank in a three-minute video makes an appeal to pay attention for dangerous magnetic fields from our communication devices.

== Human safety organizations ==
- United Nations International Non-Ionizing Radiation Committee (INIRC)
- United Nations International Radiation Protection Association (IRPA)
- USA Occupational Safety and Health Act (OSHA). The Occupational Safety and Health Act of 1970 mandates that all nongovernment employers provide a safe and healthful workplace for their employees.
- National Institute for Occupational Safety and Health (NIOSH)
- USA National Council on Radiation Protection and Measurements (NCRP)
- BUL Организация на дейността за осигуряване на Здраве и безопасност (Organization of Health and Safety Activities)
- GEO შრომის უსაფრთხოების, ჯანმრთელობისა და გარემოს დაცვის ასოციაციის (OSHE Georgia)
- RUS Организация пропаганды по охране труда и безопасности
- EU European Agency for Safety and Health at Work
- CHN China Occupational Safety and Health Association (COSHA)
- IND Ministry of Labor and Health OSH India
- ESP National Institute for Safety and Health at Work
- BRA Ministério Público do Trabalho

== Standards ==
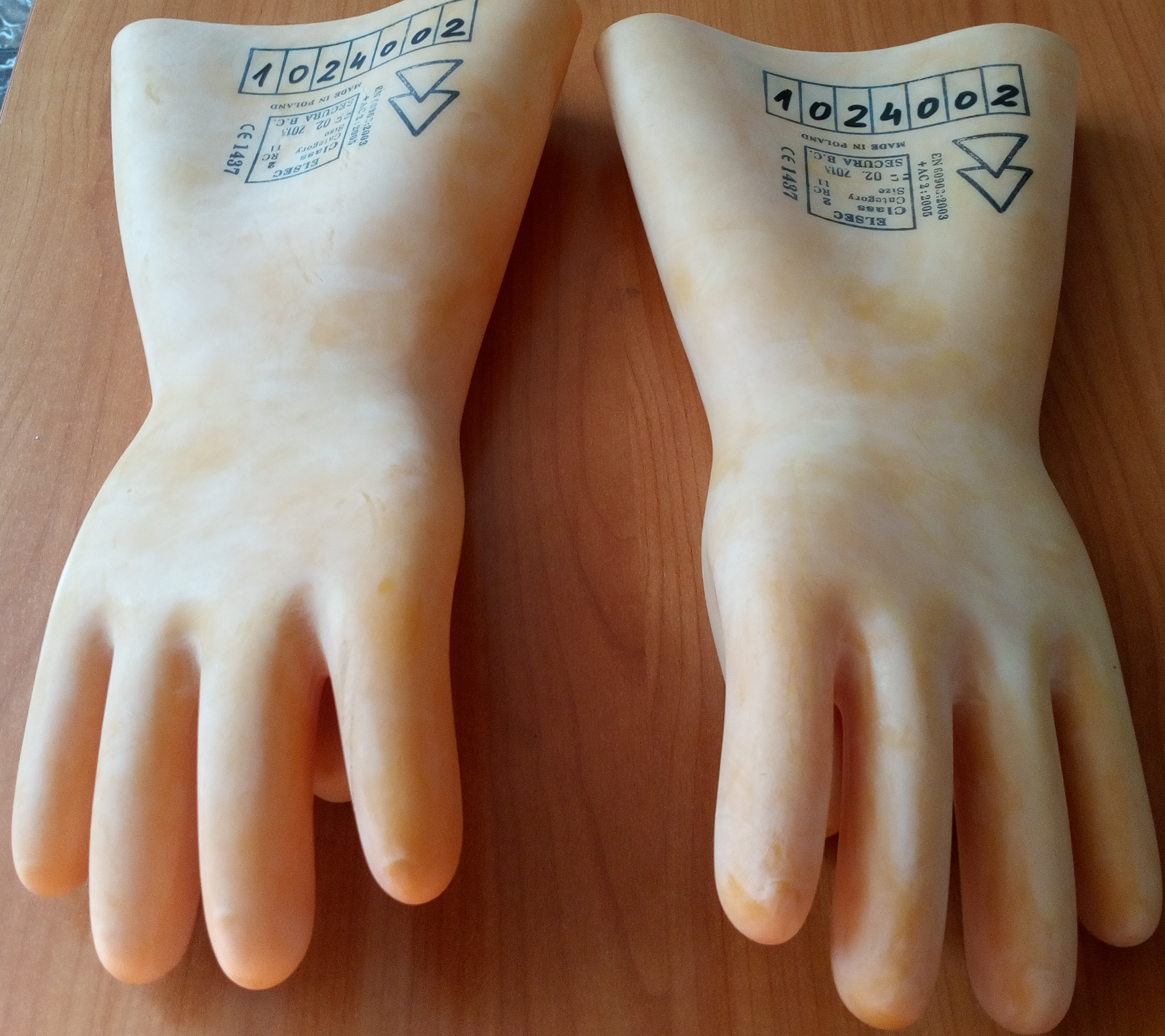
Electrical safety gloves

- BUL БДС(Български Държавен Стандарт) (Bulgarian state standard) – ISO 45001:2018 (БДС ISO 45001:2018) Bulgaria
- CHN GB/CCC – China CHN-1974-L-37879 Protection against particular hazards
- FRA NF (La norme français) NF EN 358 France
- GBR BS (British standard) BS EN 1005-3:2002+A1:2008 – United Kingdom
- IND IS (India Standardization) – India – IS-5216, IS-5571, IS-6665
- POL PN (Polska Norma) – Poland – PN-93/N-01256/03 Znaki BHP w miejscu pracy
- RUS ГОСТ 12.2.061-81 СИСТЕМА СТАНДАРТОВ БЕЗОПАСНОСТИ ТРУДА ОБОРУДОВАНИЕ ПРОИЗВОДСТВЕННОЕ
- USA OSHA – United States; IAEA safety standards – nuclear, radiation waste safety standards
- ESP REAL DECRETO 486/1997

== Classification ==
=== Standard protection from radio frequency electromagnetic fields ===
Continuous exposure to high frequency or high intensity electromagnetic fields can lead to instantaneous health problems or over time to develop a variety of illnesses, such as nervous disorders and others. Low frequency fields with frequencies between 0 and 10 megahertz that are strong enough can stimulate sensory organs or nerves and cause magnetophosphenes (light flashes), vertigo, nausea or muscle twitches and pain. The standards are drawn up with a set of rules for protection from to limit human exposure to electric fields, magnetic fields and electromagnetic fields. Frequency bands of danger EMF, Zones of danger EMF, types of risks, safety and shielding equipment are categorized in the standards.

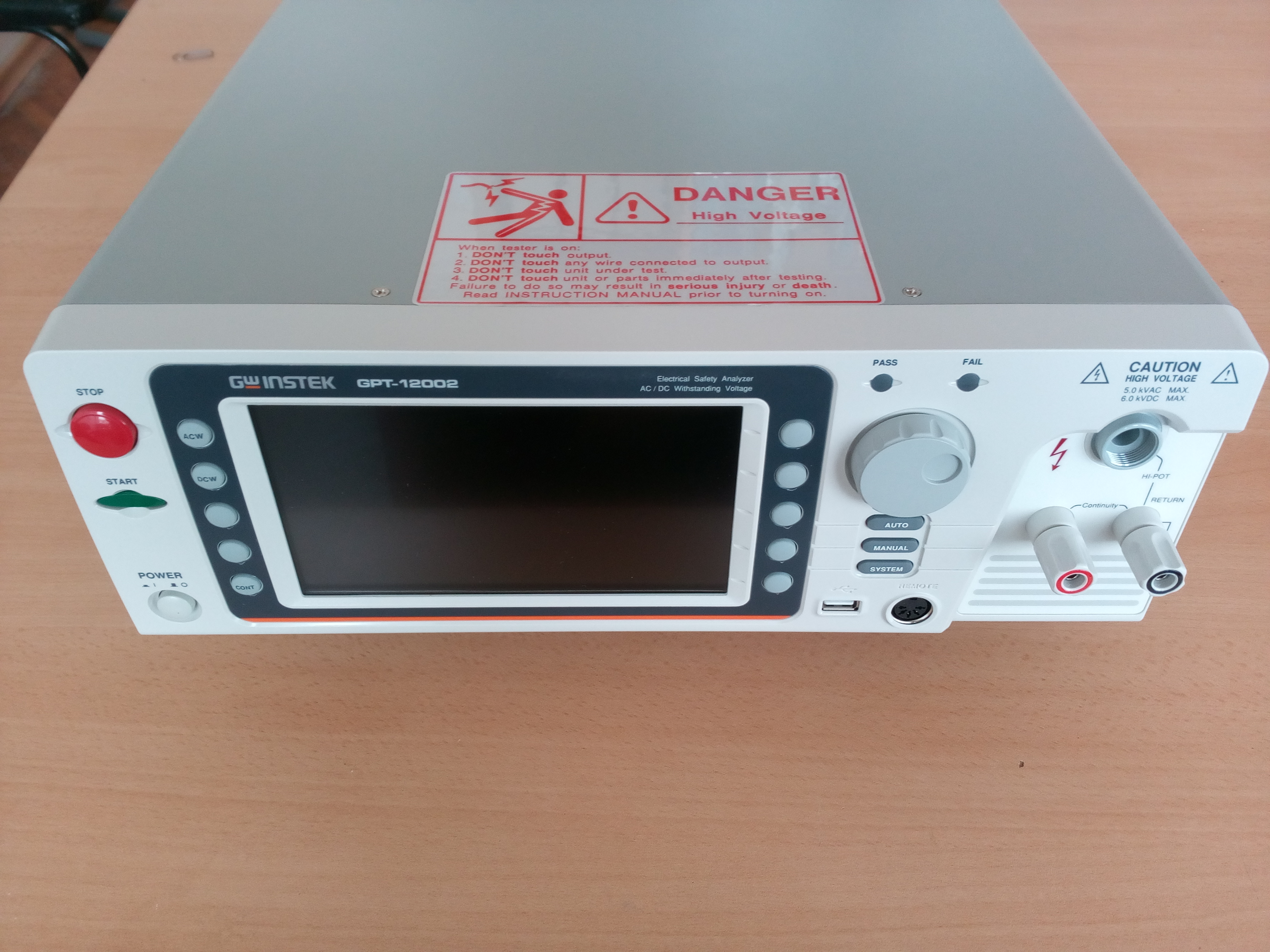
Electrical safety analyser

- BUL БДС EN 50664:2017 Общ стандарт за демонстриране на съответствието на устройства/съоръжения, използвани от работници при въвеждане в експлоатация или обслужване на място, с граничните стойности за облъчване от електромагнитни полета (0 Hz - 300 GHz)
- CHN GB 8702-88 电磁辐射防护规定
- EU 1999/519/CE Council Recommendation of 12 July 1999 on the limitation of exposure of the general public to electromagnetic fields (0 Hz to 300 GHz)
- FRA NF EN 50360 Norme de produit pour la mesure de conformité des téléphones mobiles aux restrictions de base relatives à l'exposition des personnes aux champs électromagnétiques (300 MHz - 3 GHz)
- GEO საქართველოს მთავრობის დადგენილება No.340 2013 წლის 17 დეკემბერი ქ. თბილისი
- GER DGUV V15 Elektromagnetische Felder
- ITA CEI EN 62209-1
- POL PN-EN ISO/IEC 17025:2005 Ogólne wymagania dotyczące kompetencji laboratoriów badawczych i wzorcujących
- RUS ГОСТ 12.4.306-2016 Система стандартов безопасности труда (ССБТ). Комплект экранирующий для защиты персонала от электромагнитных полей радиочастотного диапазона. Методы испытаний
- USA ANSI/IEEE C95.1–1992 IEEE Standard for Safety Levels with Respect to Human Exposure to Radio Frequency Electromagnetic Fields,

3 kHz to 300 GHz

==== EMF medical devices ====
A high frequency electromagnetic field can cause negative effects on the nervous system. Also, high intensity fields can cause serious damage to some organs. The health of people with implanted pacemakers and other electronic devices can be seriously harmed. Such irradiation can lead to death.

- GEO საქართველოს მთავრობის დადგენილება No.340 2013 წლის 17 დეკემბერი ქ. თბილისი
- GER DGUV V15
- GBR BS EN 45502-1: 1998 Active implantable medical devices Part 1. General requirements for safety, marking and information to be provided by the manufacturer
- ITA CEI EN 62209-1
- RUS ГОСТ 20790-93 МЕЖГОСУДАРСТВЕННЫЙ СТАНДАРТ ПРИБОРЫ, АППАРАТЫ И ОБОРУДОВАНИЕ МЕДИЦИНСКИЕ
- POL PN-EN ISO/IEC 17025:2005
- USA C95.1-2345-2014 IEEE Standard for Military Workplaces—Force Health Protection Regarding Personnel Exposure to Electric, Magnetic, and Electromagnetic Fields, 0 Hz to 300 GHz

=== Laser protection standard ===
Laser damage can be fatal to human vision. In the standards are defined the types of the laser equipment and its application. Safe distances from the laser equipment to the visual apparatus are also categorized.

- BUL БДС EN 171:2005/Наредба No. 9 от 28 октомври 1986
- CHN GB 10320-1995 激光设备和设施的电气安全
- GEO საქართველოს ორგანული კანონი
- ITA CEI 1381G
- IND IS 14624 (Part 2) : 2012
- POL PN-91/T-06700
- RUS ГОСТ IEC 60825-4-2014 Безопасность лазерной аппаратуры
- USA EN 60825 (IEC 825)

=== Protection from dangerous substances and preparations ===
These standards are set of rules and describe dangerous substances in machine oils, polycyclic aromatic hydrocarbons in extender oils and other chemical materials used in workplace. The Russian standard describes the physical and chemical properties of dangerous oils.

- GEO საშიში ქიმიური ნივთიერებების შესახებ 1420
- EU DIRECTIVE 2005/69/EC
- IND IS 1446: Classification of Dangerous Goods
- POL PN-EN 589
- RUS ГОСТ 30333-95 ПАСПОРТ БЕЗОПАСНОСТИ ВЕЩЕСТВА (МАТЕРИАЛА)
- SWI CC 813.11 Ordinance on Protection against Dangerous Substances and Preparations

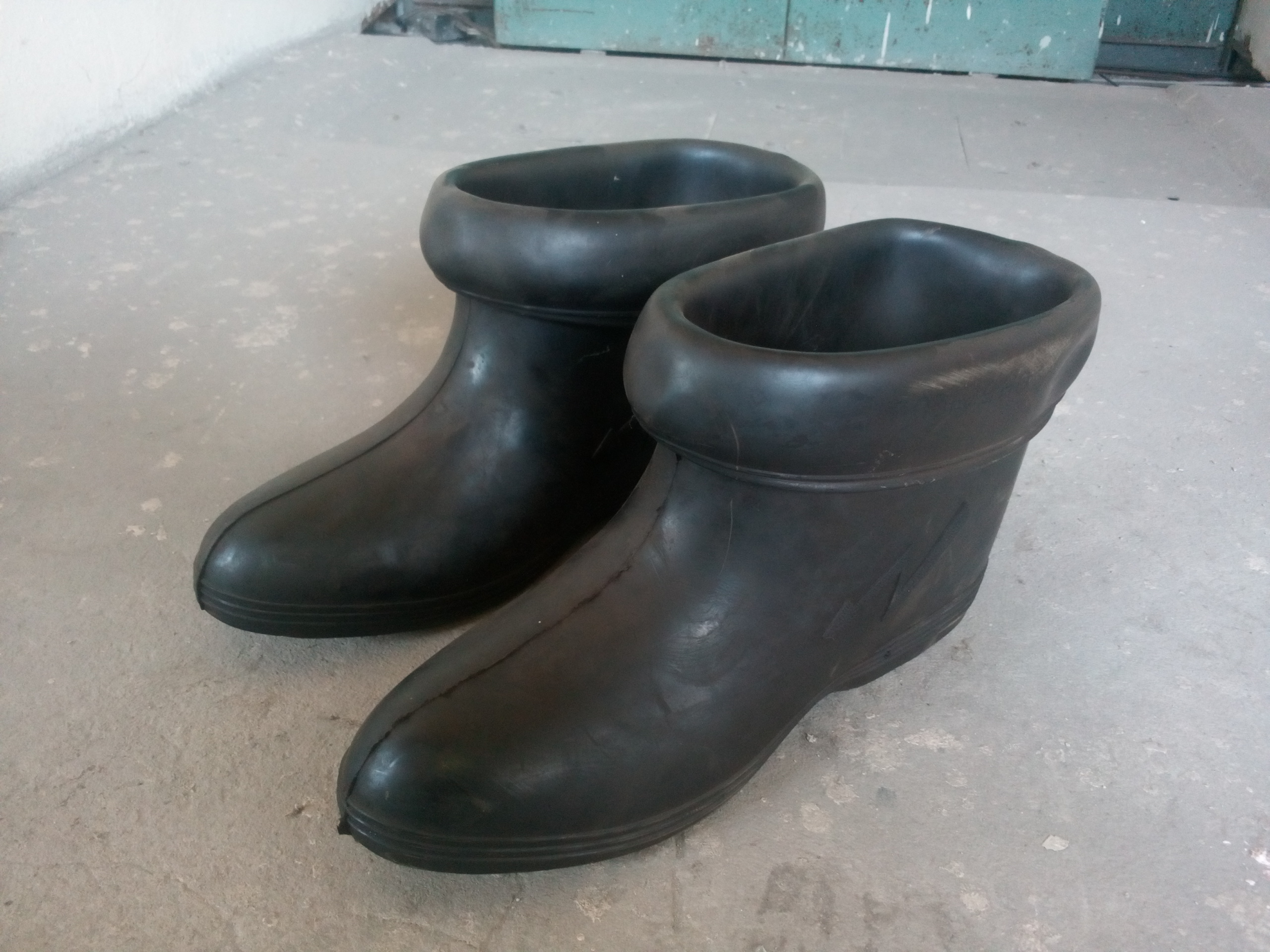
High voltage shoes

=== Welding safety ===
The following standards include safety and sanitary regulations for welding, cutting, and surface machining, as well as industrial process steps and guidelines on hazardous aerosols or other airborne particulates generated in these processes.

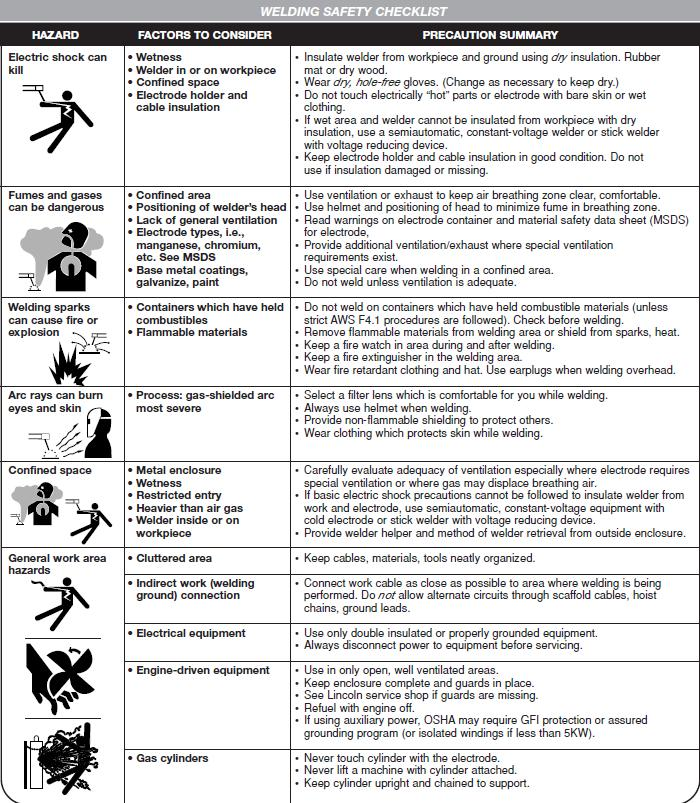

- ARM ԳՕՍՏ ԵՆ 439-2002 Գազեր պաշտպանական աղեղային եռակցման և կտրման համար. Դասակարգում
- CHN AQ 4214-2011 焊接工艺防尘防毒技术规范
- ESP NTP 494: Soldadura eléctrica al arco: normas de seguridad
- FRA NF An 85-002
- GER DIN EN 1011-1
- GEO შემდუღებელი 041272 პროფესიული სტანდარტი
- IND Is 818 Code of Practice for Safety and Health for Welding
- POL PN-EN 1598:2004 Norma wycofana i zastąpiona przez
- RUS ГОСТ 12.3.003-86 Система стандартов безопасности труда (ССБТ). Работы электросварочные. Требования безопасности
- USA AWS D17.1/D17.1M:2017

=== Vibration safety ===
- ARM ԳՕՍՏ ԵՆ 792-1-2012 Ձեռքի էլեկտրական մեքենաներ. Անվտանգության պահանջներ. Մաս 1. Առանց պարուրակի մասերի ամրացման համար մեքենաներ
- BUL БДС 12.1.012:1980 Охрана на труда. Вибрации. Общи изисквания за безопасност на труда
- ESP NTP 839 Notas Técnicas de Prevención 839 Exposición a vibraciones mecánicas. Evaluación del riesgo
- FRA NF EN ISO 13090 Vibrations et chocs mécaniques
- IND IS 13276-1: Mechanical Vibration
- POL 2002/44/WE Direktiwa w sprawie minimalnych wymagańw zakresie ochrony zdrowia i bezpieczeństwa dotyczącychnarażenia pracowników na ryzyko spowodowane czynnikami fizycznymi (wibracji)
- RUS ГОСТ 12.1.012-78 Система стандартов безопасности труда. Вибрация. Общие требования безопасности
- USA AS2670 - 2001 Evaluation of human exposure to whole-body vibration.
- USA AS ISO 5349.1-2013 Mechanical vibration - Measurement and evaluation of human exposure to hand-transmitted vibration - General requirements

=== Noise safety ===
- IND IS 3483-1965
- USA IEEE 656-2018 - IEEE Standard for the Measurement of Audible Noise from Overhead Transmission Lines
- RUS ГОСТ 12.1.003-83 ССБТ. Шум. Общие требования безопасности
- POL PN-EN 352-5:2005/A1:2007
- FRA NF EN 61310-1 Sécurité des machines - Indication, marquage et manoeuvre - Partie 1 : exigences pour les signaux visuels, acoustiques et tactiles
- GER DIN 4109 Normenübersicht Schallschutz (Bau- und Raumakustik)

=== Ultrasound safety ===
Working with ultrasound can damage the nervous and auditory systems.

- RUS ГОСТ 12.1.001-89 Система стандартов безопасности труда (ССБТ). Ультразвук. Общие требования безопасности
- USA IEEE 790-1989 - IEEE Guide for Medical Ultrasound Field Parameter Measurements
- FRA NF C74-335
- GER DIN EN 60601-2-5
- BUL БДС 12.1.001:1979 Охрана на труда. Ултразвук. Общи изисквания по безопасност на труда

=== Air ===
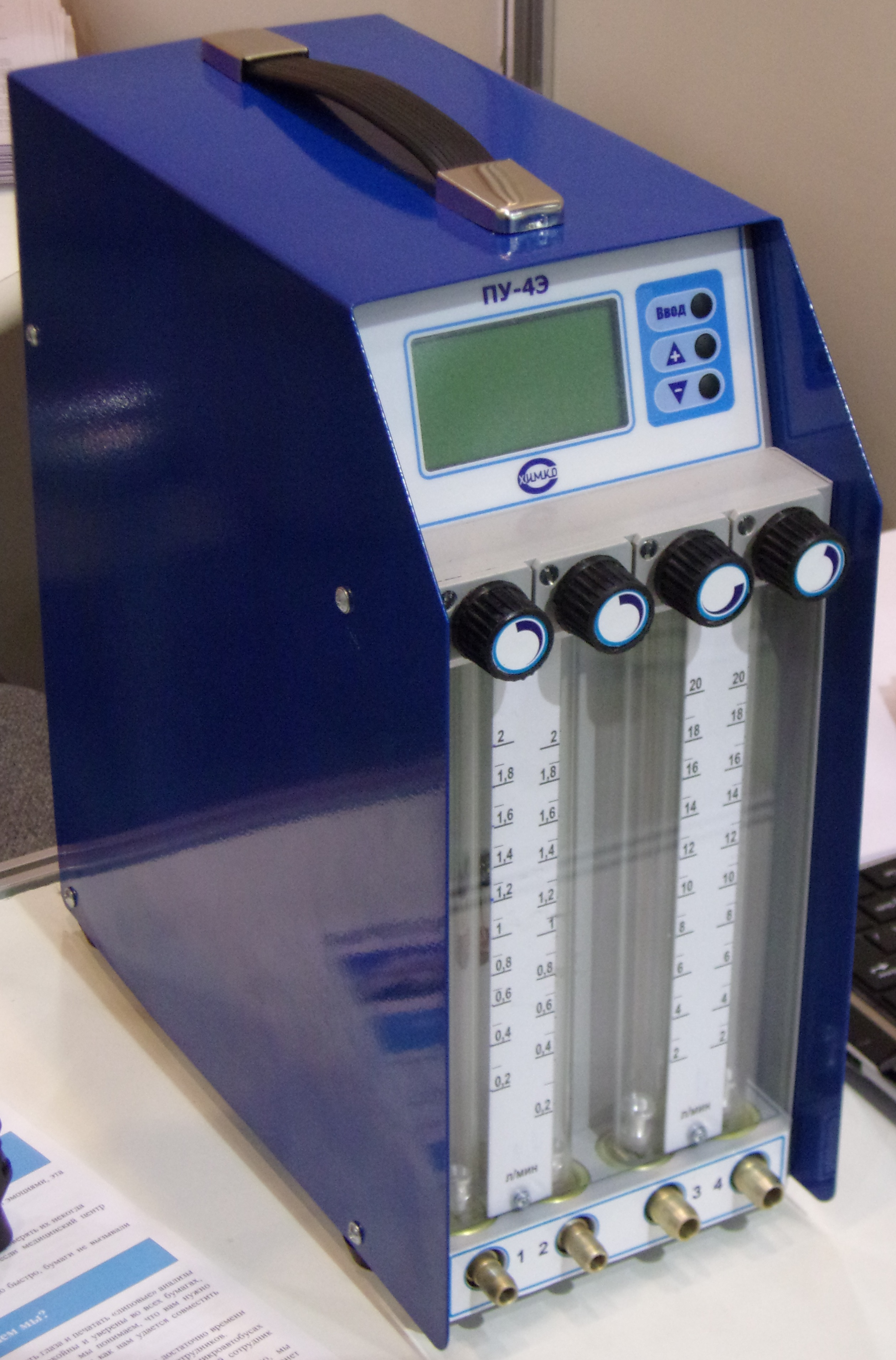
Stationary aspirator

These standards provide guidance on the use and maintenance of devices for determining concentrations of chemical and biological agents in the workplace air.

- BUL БДС EN 14042:2005 Въздух на работното място. Ръководство за приложение и използване на процедури за оценяване излагането на въздействие на химични и биологични агенти
- GBR BS EN ISO 16017-1:2001, Indoor, ambient and workplace air
- FRA NF EN ISO 16017-2 Air intérieur, air ambiant et air des lieux de travail
- RUS ГОСТ 30494-2011. Здания жилые и общественные. Параметры микроклимата в помещениях

=== Microclimatic parameters of the work environment ===
- BUL Наредба No. РД-07-3 от 18.07.2014 г. за минималните изисквания за микроклимата на работните места

Dust Control

==== Thermal environment ====
- RUS ГОСТ Р ИСО 7243-2007 Термальная среда. Расчет тепловой нагрузки на работающего человека, основанный на показателе WBGT (температура влажного шарика психрометра)
- USA ISO 7726 Ergonomics of the thermal environment – Instruments for measuring physical

quantities

- USA ISO 8896 Ergonomics of the thermal environment – Determination of metabolic rate
- GER DIN EN ISO 7730 Klima am Arbeitsplatz

=== Nanotechnology safety ===
Approaches to Safe Nanotechnology - Managing the Health and Safety Concerns Associated with Engineered Nanomaterials

- RUS ГОСТ Р 57933-2017 Нанотехнологии. Наноматериалы. Токсиколого-гигиеническая оценка безопасности. Общие требования к проведению испытаний на лабораторных животных
- USA ISO/TS 12901-1:2012(en) Nanotechnologies - Occupational risk management applied to engineered nanomaterials - Part 1: Principles and approaches

=== Artificial light on workplace ===
The use of artificial light as the sole source of light or mixing artificial and daylight might cause ill-health effects, both physical and mental, such as eye strain, headaches, or fatigue. The standards address the types of light that negatively affect vision, angles of light in different environments, illumination standards per square meter, and protection methods such as the UGR method.

- BUL БДС EN 12464
- CHN GB50034-2013 建筑照明设计标准
- RUS ГОСТ Р 55710-2013 Освещение рабочих мест внутри зданий. Нормы и методы измерений
- USA EN 12464 “Lighting of indoor workplaces”

=== Hazardous Area Classification ===
- GBR BS EN 60079 Hazardous Area Classification and Control of Ignition Sources
- IND IS 5572-1994 Hazardous Area Classification IS 5572-1994
- RUS ГОСТ Р 51330.9-99 Классификация опасных зон
- USA National Electrical Code(NEC) Article 505
- United Nations IEC 60079-10.2 Classification of areas

== Protection devices ==
- EMF meter – an instrument for measuring danger EMF fields, which affects human health (EMF measurement)
- Environmental meter – an instrument for measuring hazardous materials response
- EMF shield protection materials

== Supporting software ==
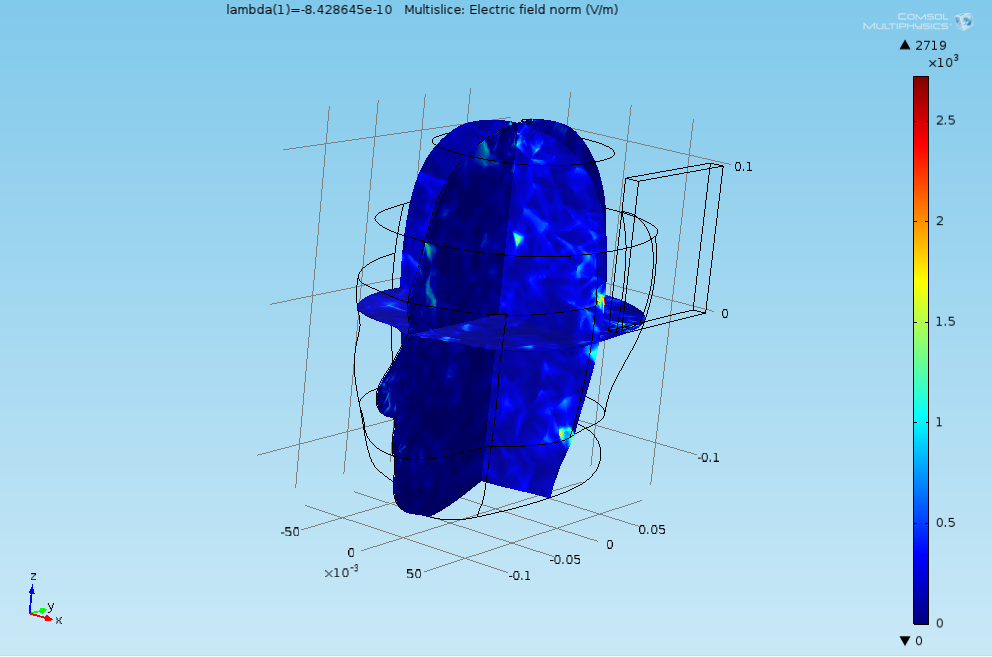
EMF in human head simulation COMSOL Multiphysics

There are thousands of software products today which can simulate workplace hazards.

- Narda EFC-400EP – software for calculation dangerous magnetic fields
- Sphera – software for Integrated Risk Management software and information services with a focus on Environmental Health & Safety (EHS)
- MY Compliance Management
- ALOHA Software – details can be entered about a real or potential chemical release and it will generate threat zone estimates for various types of hazards
- WeldZone Simulator – simulates the effect of electromagnetic fields on welders, providing a 3D visual representation of exposure levels and highlighting the associated risks

== Congress and Conferences for health and safety work ==
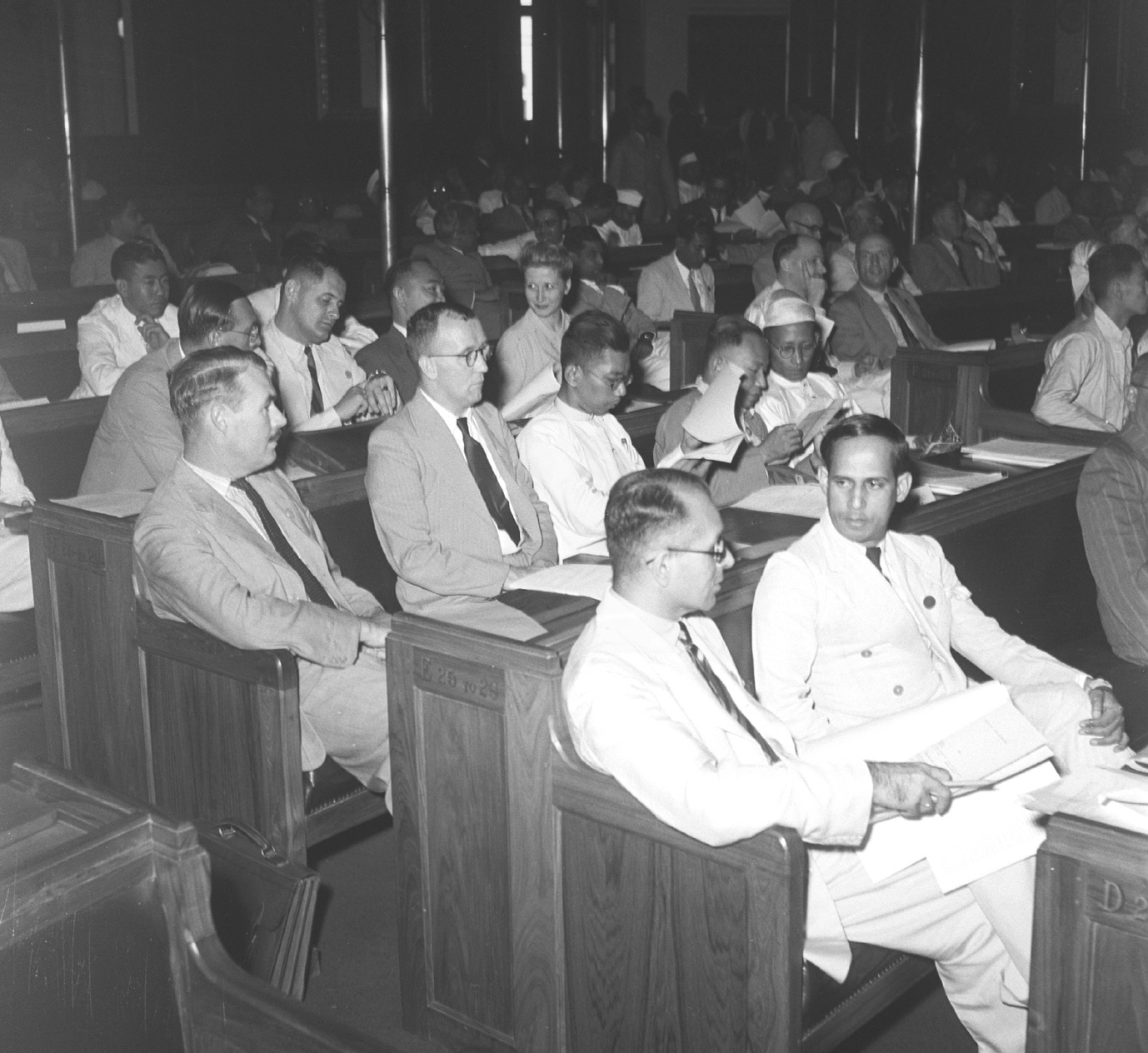
ILO conference

=== World Congress on Safety and Health ===
The forum is organized by the International Labour Organization. The first World Congress on Safety and Health was held in Rome in 1955.

- 2020 Canada XXII
- 2017 Singapore XXI
- 2014 Germany XX

=== Workplace Safety Conference ===
The forum is organized by OSHA.

- American Conference of Governmental Industrial Hygienists

== Workplace safety symbols ==
Workplace safety symbols are classified in several categories:

- European hazard pictograms
- ADR pictograms, an implementation of the UN recommended labels
- GHS hazard pictograms
- Green Emergency – emergency exits, escape routes, and on first aid kits ISO 7010
- Blue Mandatory – instructions to wash hands, use a safety harness, or wear safety glasses for example
- Red Prohibition – instruction to not touch, not enter, no access, and even evacuation

== Gallery ==
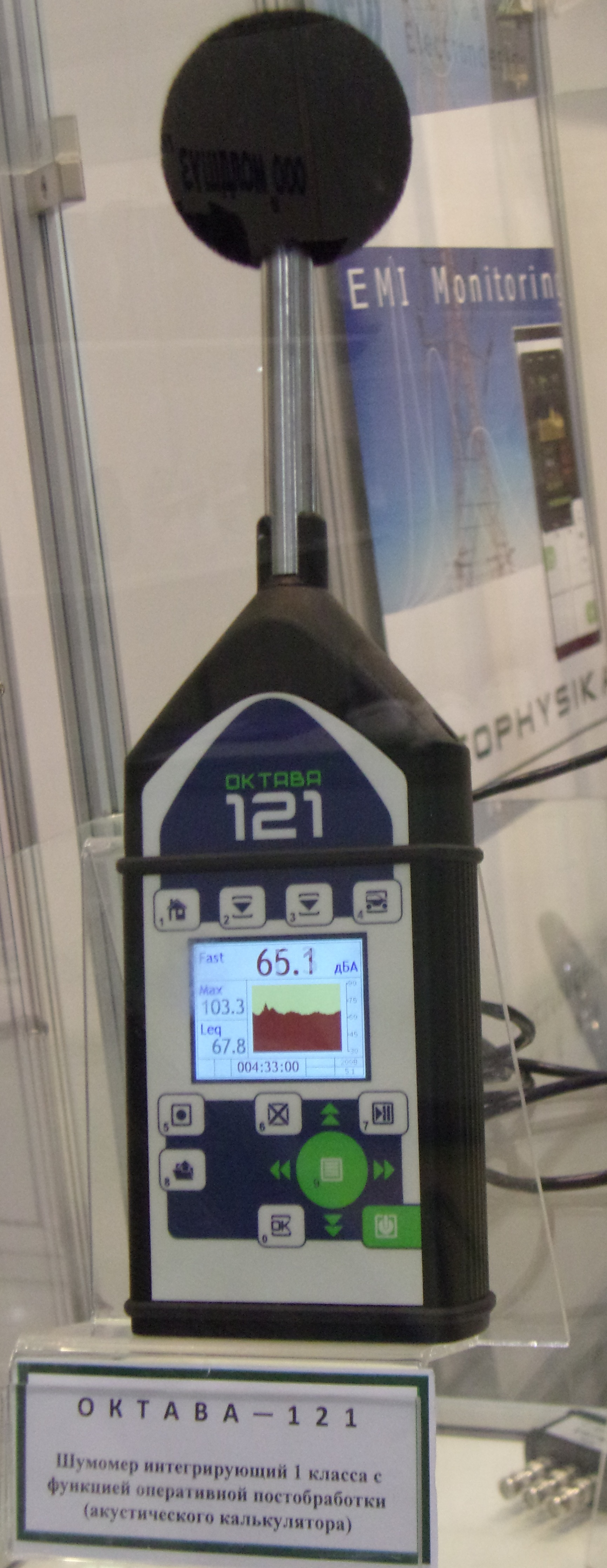
Noise meter

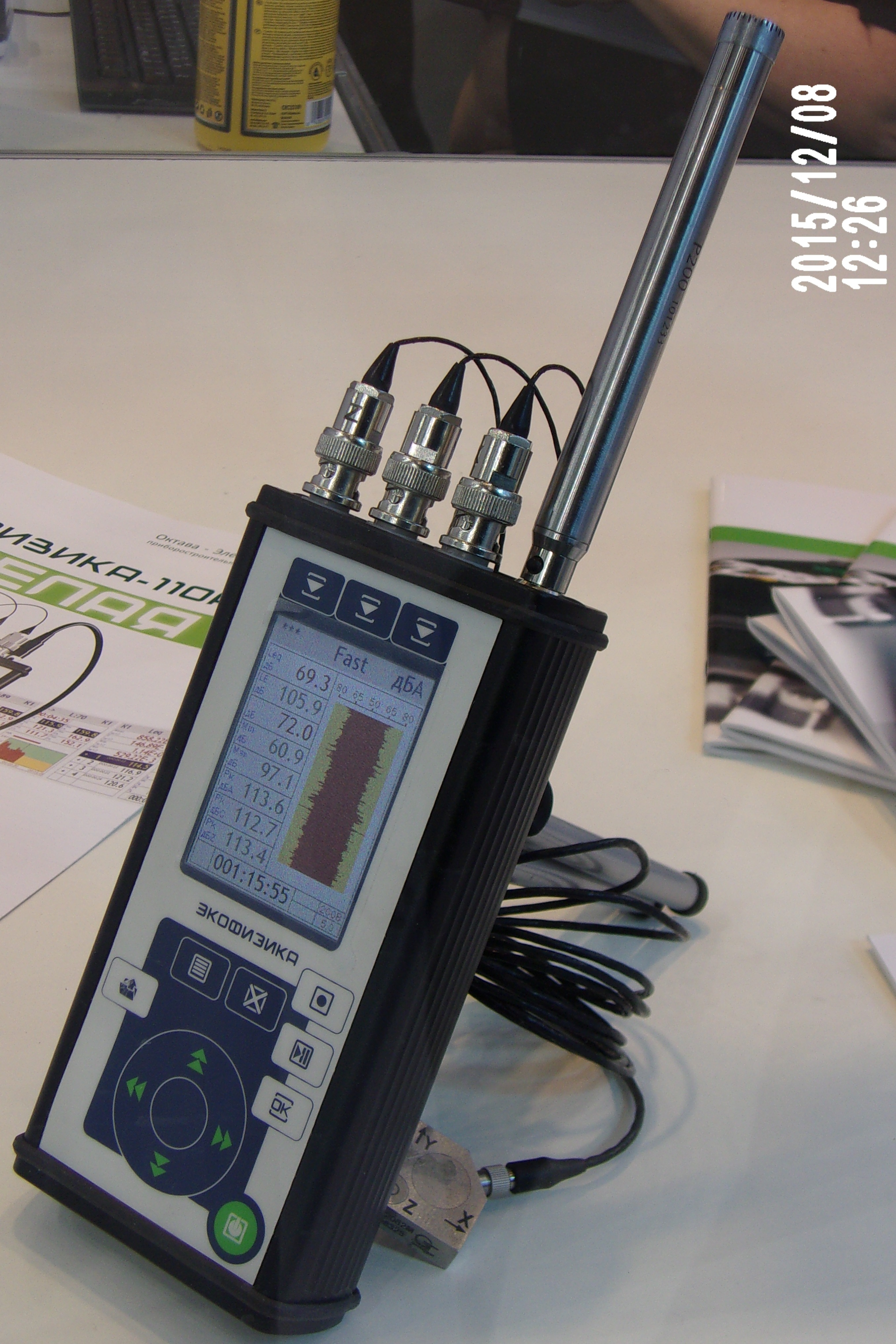
Gas analyzer, Moscow

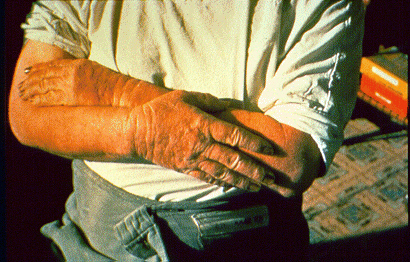
Hands damaged by kerosene

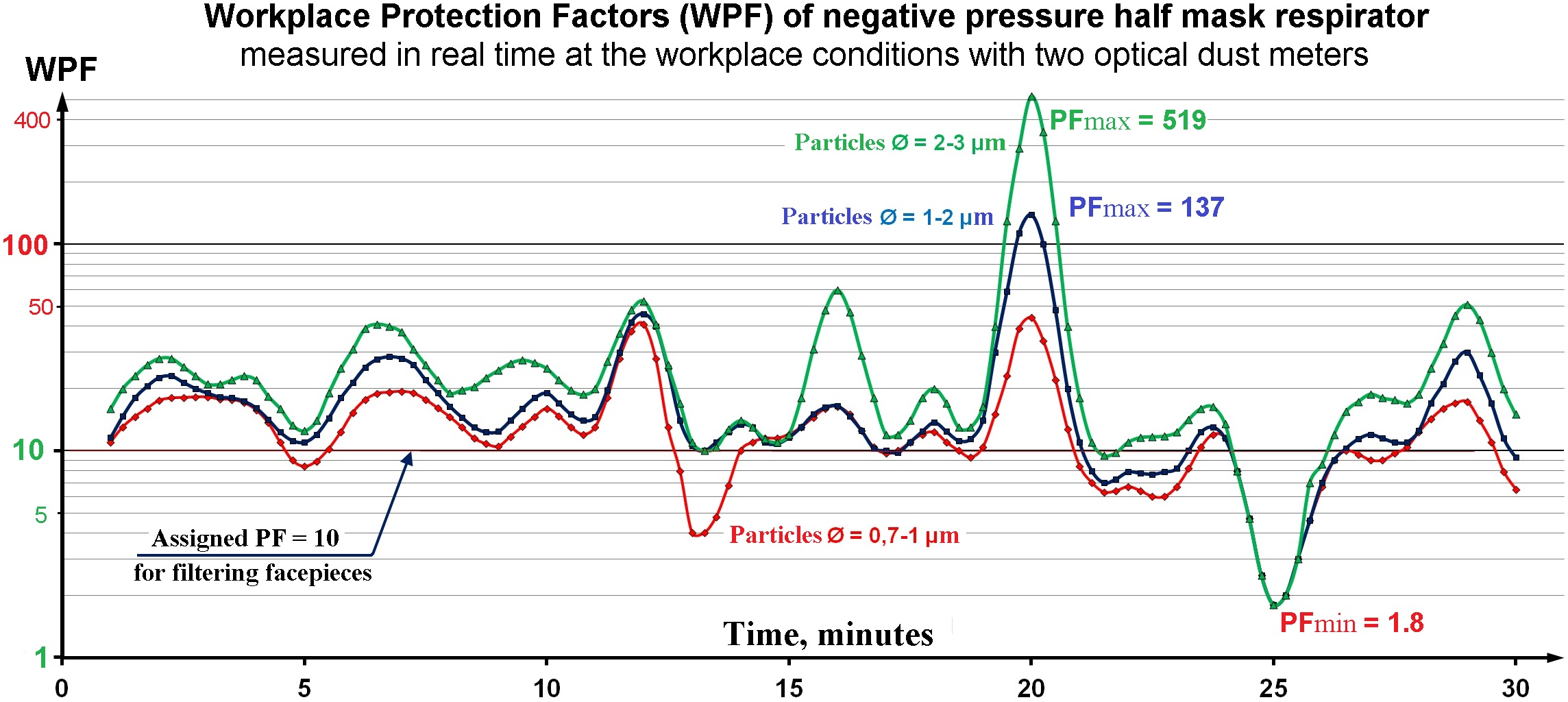
Protection Factors

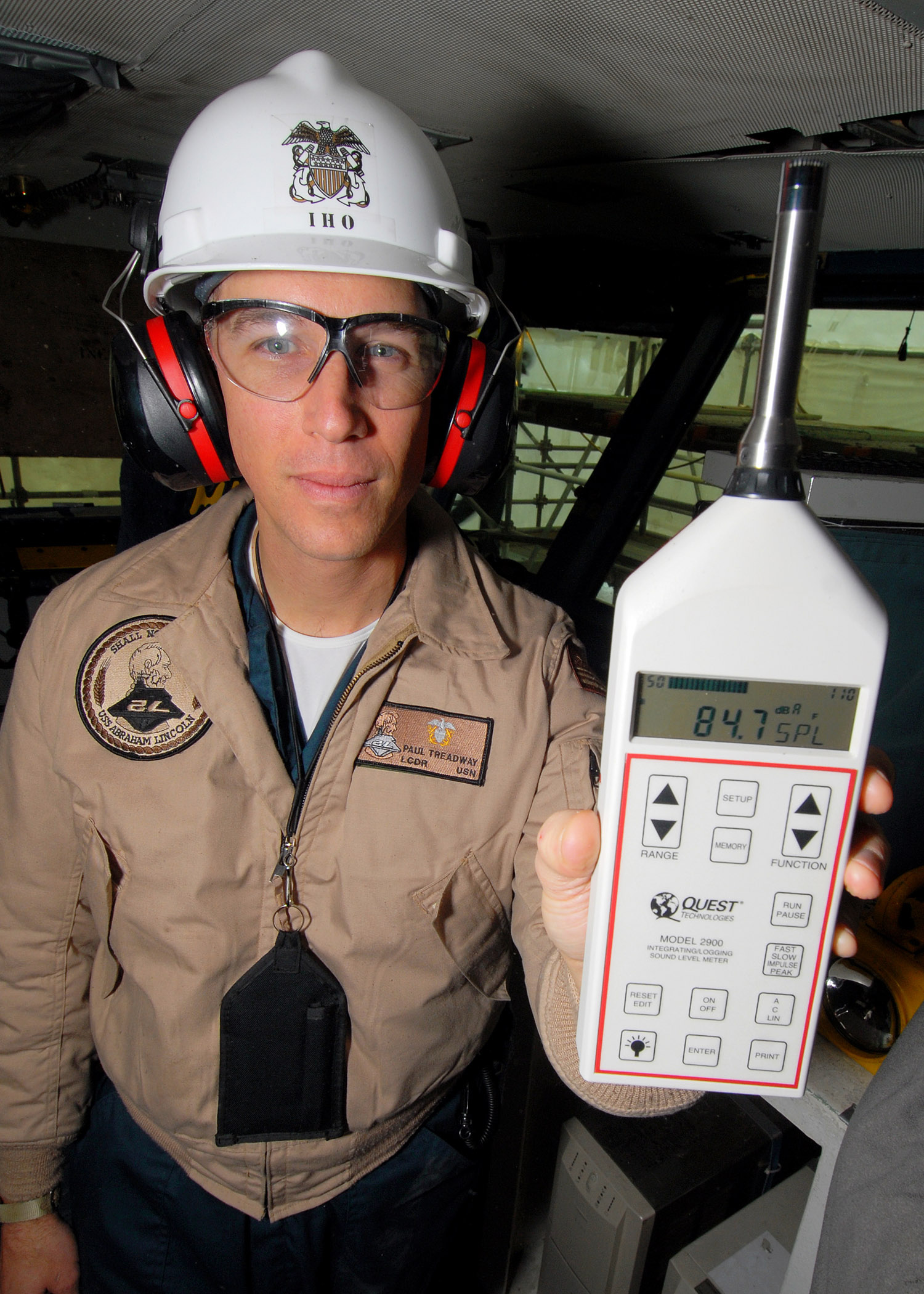
Sound level meter

Laser radiation safety symbol

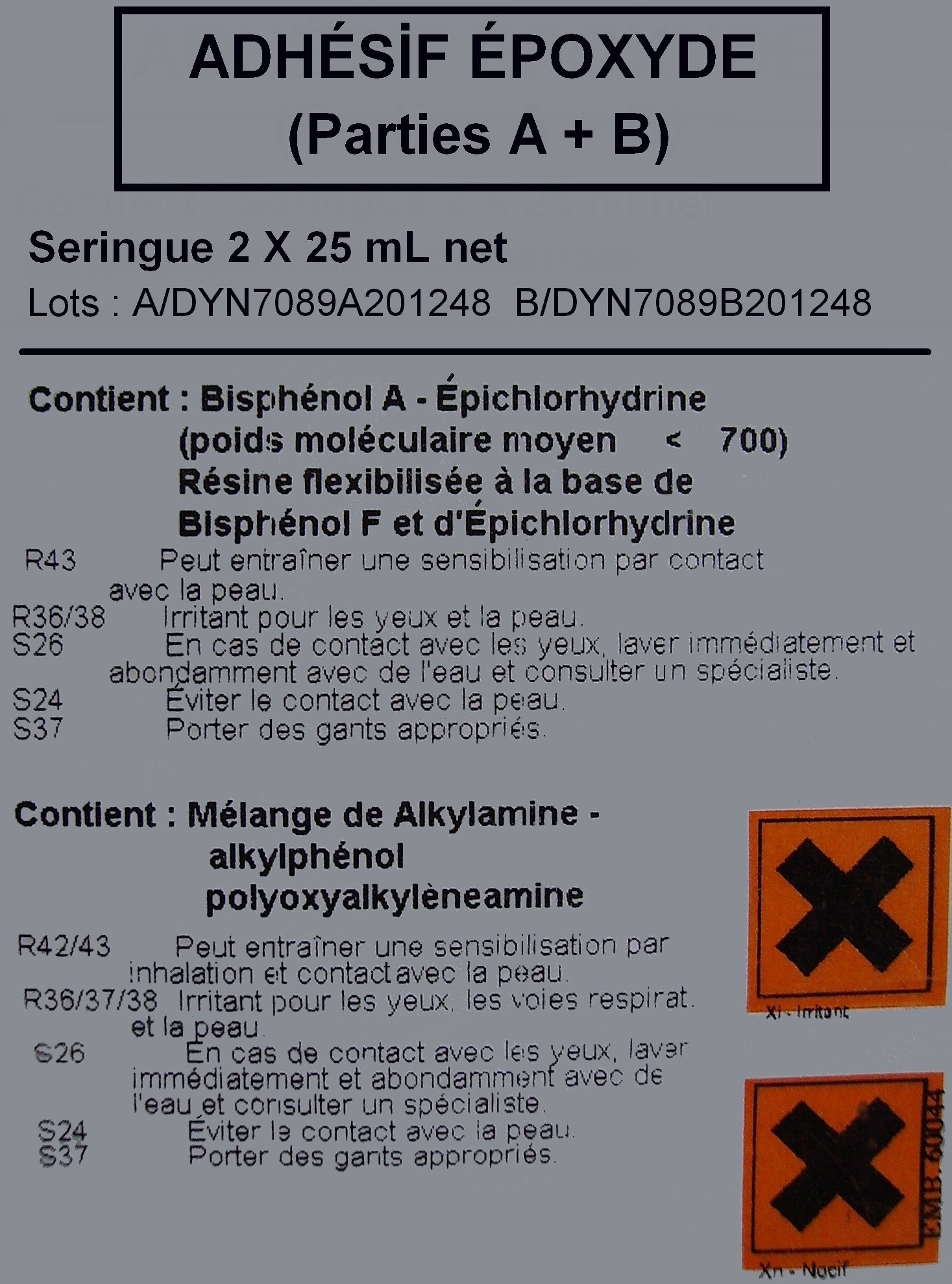
Hazard label on epoxy adhesive

Explosive hazard sign

Radio waves hazard symbol

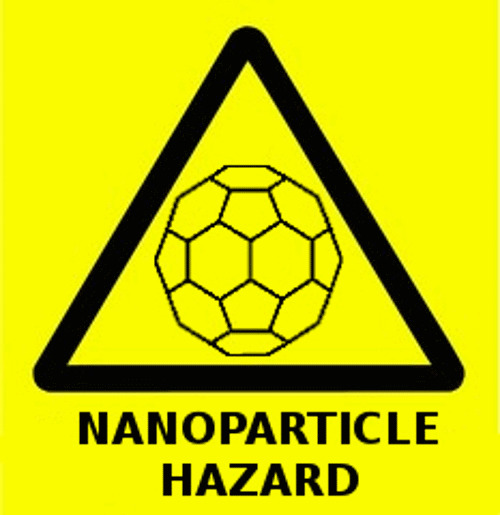
Hazard nanoparticle sign

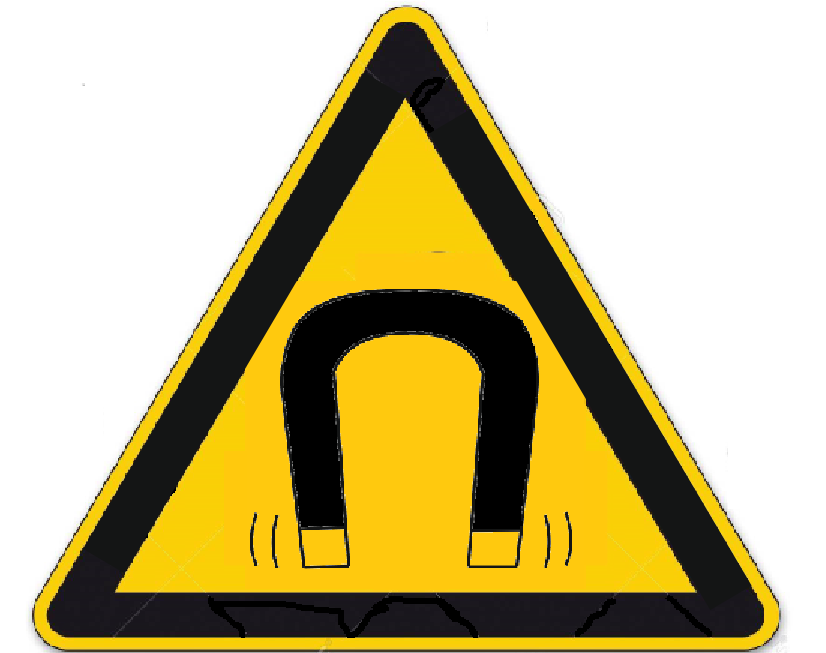
Magnetic field hazard symbol

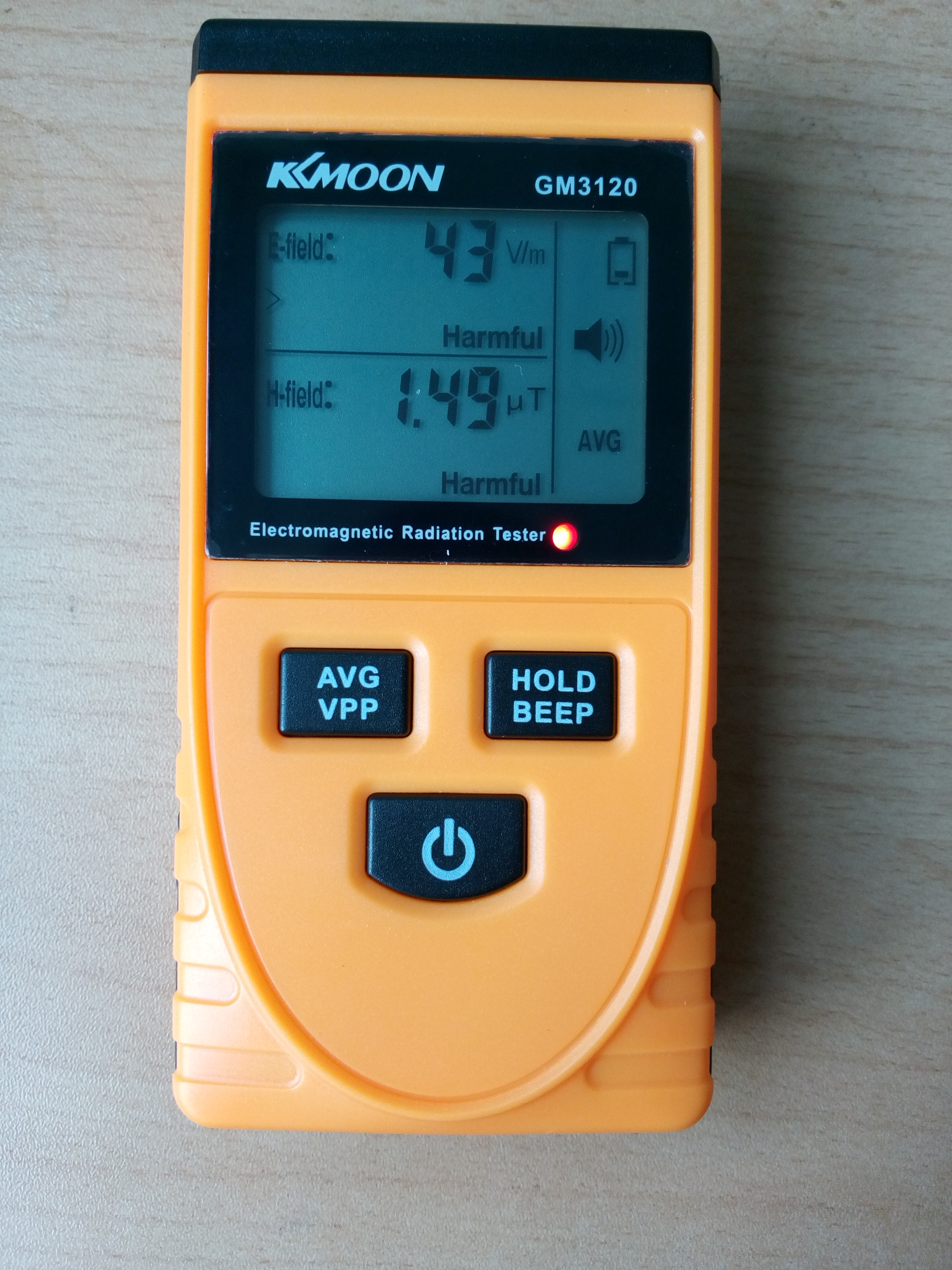
Electromagnetic radiation tester

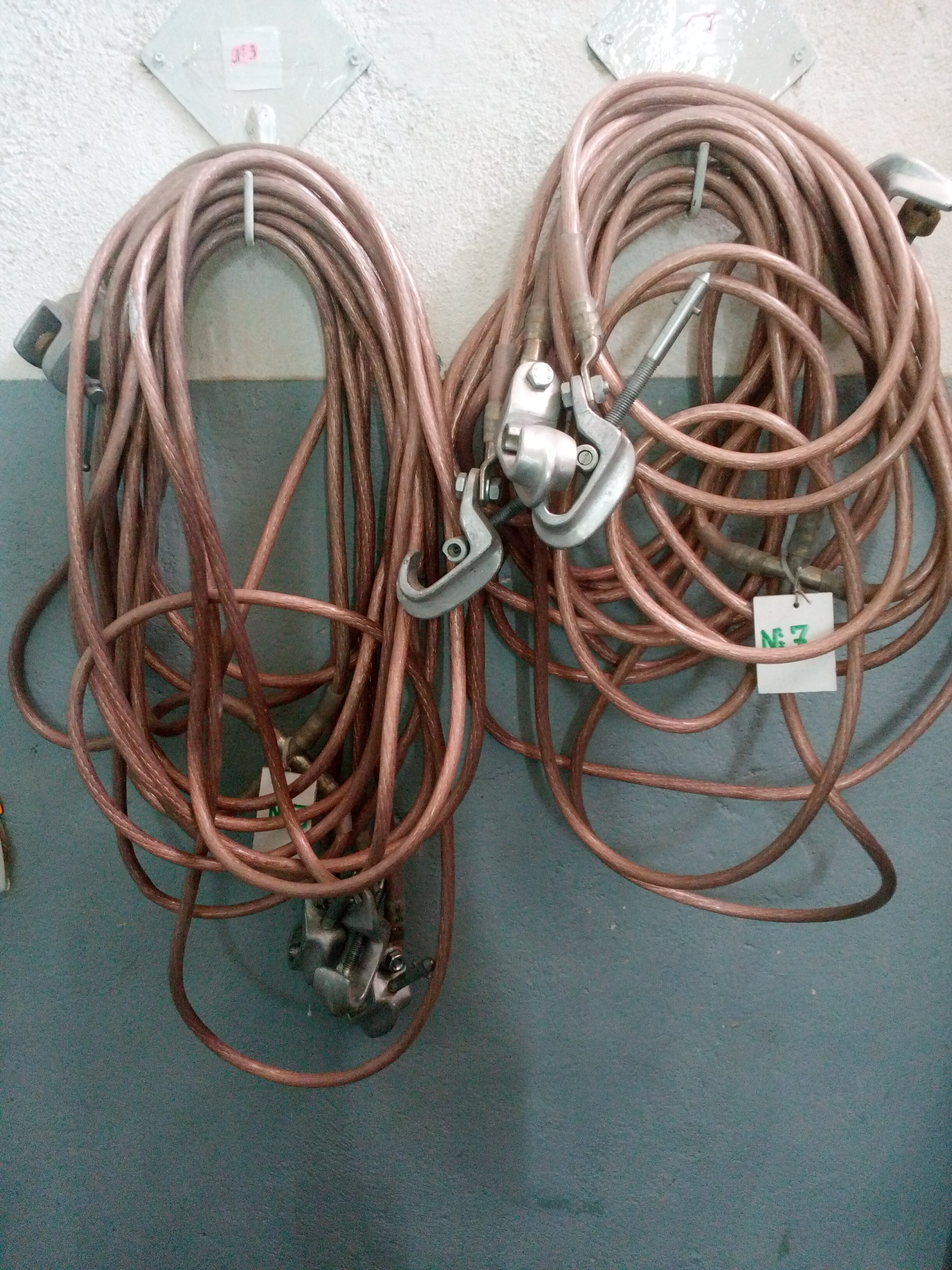
Portable grounding

Chemical hazard sign

== See also ==
- Occupational safety and health
