= Bekefi =

Békefi, Békefy, Békeffi, Békeffy, Bekefi, Bekfi is a Hungarian patronymic surname literally meaning "son of Beke". Notable people with the surname include:

- Antal Békefi (writer) (1858–1907), Hungarian writer, novelist, journalist, and editor
- Antal Békefi (composer) (1926–1982), Hungarian composer, music writer, conductor, cantor, and teacher
- Bianka Békefi, Hungarian tennis player
- George Bekefi (1925–1995), American plasma physicist, professor at MIT, and inventor
- István Békeffy (1901–1977), Hungarian screenwriter and playwright
- László Békeffi (1891–1962), Hungarian comedian, entertainer, cabaret writer, and actor
- Remig Békefi (1858–1924, Hungarian priest, church historian, and university professor
