= Eli Jerby =

Israeli academic

- אלי ג'רבי
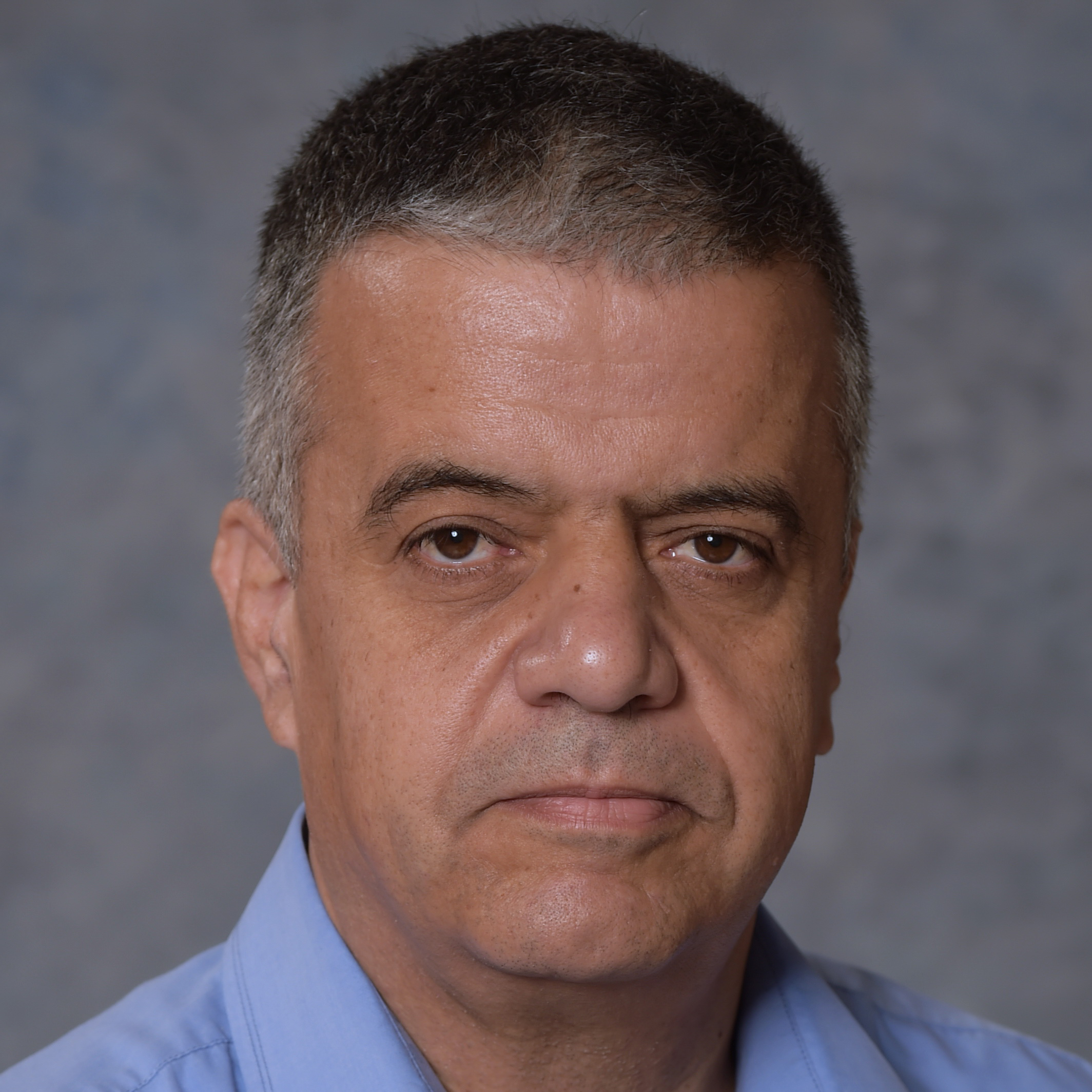
- Born: June 22, 1957 (age 69); Israel
- Education: Tel Aviv University (Ph.D., 1988)
- Occupation: Researcher in the field of electrical engineering
- Employer: Tel Aviv University
- Notable work: The microwave drill, localized microwave heating (LMH), ejection of plasma (ionized gas) from solids by LMH in fire-column and fireball forms, LMH-based additive manufacturing (3D printing), thermite ignition by LMH, and microwave impacts on materials in various phases

Eliahu (Eli) Jerby (Hebrew: אלי ג'רבי; born June 22, 1957) is a full professor at the Iby and Aladar Fleischman Faculty of Engineering, Tel Aviv University (TAU). His studies deal with localized interactions between electromagnetic (EM) radiation and materials in various phases. These include solids, powders, and plasmas, and their phase transitions. He also develops applications for these phenomena in the microwave regime.

== Biography ==
Jerby graduated in 1979 with bachelor's and master's degrees in electrical engineering at Tel Aviv University. His PhD thesis (1988) introduced a 3D linear theory of free-electron lasers (FELs). He did his post-doc as a Fulbright and Rothschild Fellow in the laboratory of Prof. George Bekefi at the Massachusetts Institute of Technology (MIT). Since 1991 he has been a faculty member at TAU's Faculty of Engineering.

== Research ==
Jerby's early studies dealt with amplification mechanisms of EM waves by electron beams in vacuum. These include fast-wave interactions (e.g. cyclotron-resonance masers, gyrotrons, and FELs), and their synergistic combination with slow waves in periodic structures (of 1, 2 or 3 dimensions known now as metamaterials). His FEL devices, operating at extremely low voltages, and accordingly in the UHF range, marked a record for the longest FEL's wavelength. His other innovative FEL schemes were further investigated by T. C. Marshal (FEL angular steering), H. P. Freund (slow-wave ubitron), and others.

Jerby's more recent team research deals with hotspot phenomena created by localized microwave-heating (LMH) processes. The intentional LMH effect discovered in these studies provided the basis for the microwave-drill invention, which aroused media interest worldwide. Microwave drills have since been successfully developed in various materials, including glass, concrete, and metals, and for a variety of applications.

Operating a microwave-drill device in an inverse mode causes the molten hotspot to detach from the substrate material. Further irradiation of the melt causes its vaporization in the form of a plasma column. In certain operating conditions, this plasma converges into a form of a plasma ball floating in the air. Similar experiments were followed by K. D. Stephan and other researchers. It was found later that the LMH-generated plasma also contains charged particles in nanometric and micrometric sizes, which originate from the substrate material. These add to the ions and electrons in the plasma, hence defined as dusty plasma. The similarity between these laboratory-made plasma balls and the relatively rare phenomenon of ball lightning in nature enables mimicking this natural atmospheric phenomenon in the laboratory. Similar experiments also demonstrate various volcanic phenomena, such as the flow of hot lava from the molten core of a basalt rock. These findings have also attracted media attention.

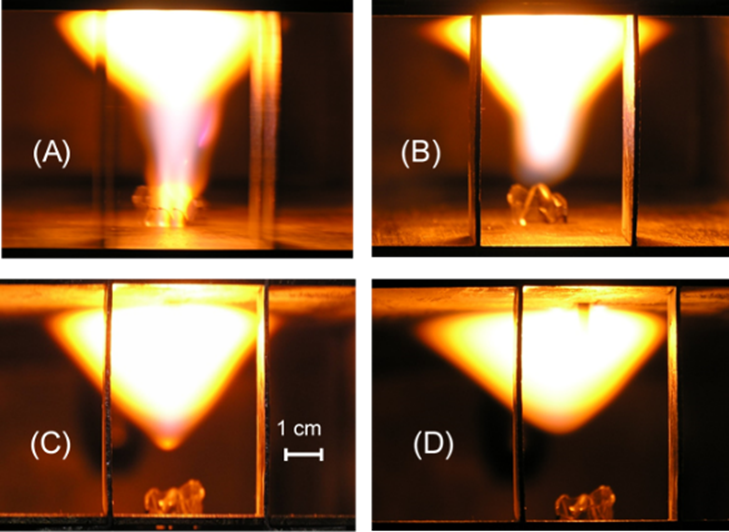
(A) Evolution of plasma in the form of a fireball, starting from a hotspot created by the LMH process on a glass substrate, from which a plasma column is emitted to feed the forming ball. (B) The plasma detaches from the hotspot, and (C) converges into a floating ball shape, adhering to the ceiling of the exposure chamber. (D) The fireball, similar to a ball lightning, continues to exist in microwave excitation.

Other studies by Jerby's group include novel LMH phenomena and applications, such as igniting thermite mixtures (led to the discovery of the bubble-marble effect), and 3D-printing of metal powders. Jerby's developments contributed to the trend of using high-power transistors for microwave heating applications.

Jerby served as the Editor of the Journal of Microwave Power and Electromagnetic Energy (JMPEE) in 2006-2009, and of AMPERE Newsletter (2015-2017). He also participated in organizing international conferences in his various research fields. Besides his scientific publications, he also authored several opinion articles related to academia-and-society issues in Israel. In 2025, Jerby was awarded an honorary membership of AIMHHA, Association of Industrial Microwave Heating and Highfrequency Applications.
