= Kudrati Chamatkar =

Sikh folk-legend

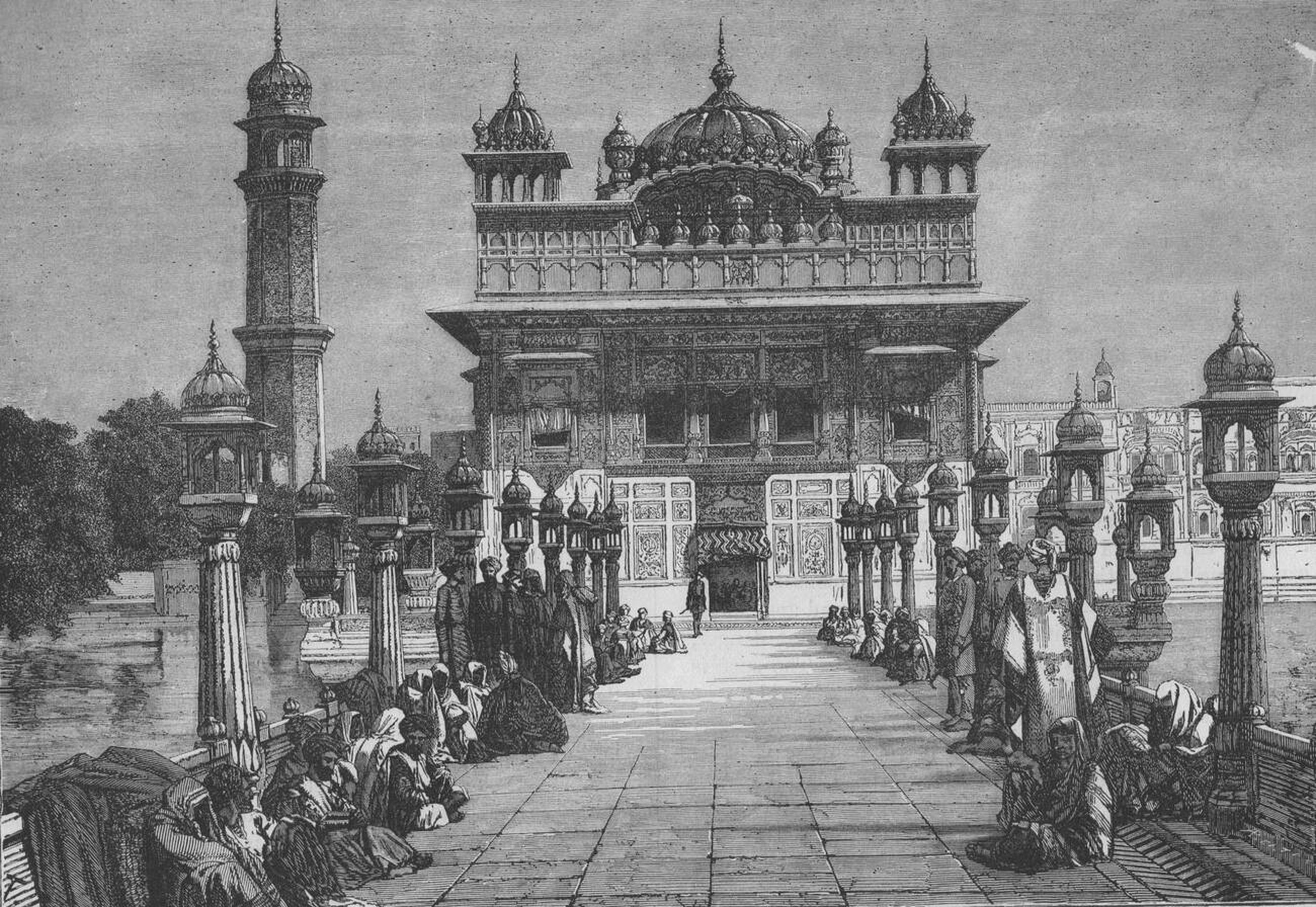
"The temple (Golden Temple) of Umritsur (Amritsar)", from the Illustrated London News, 1875

Kudrati Chamatkar (Gurmukhi: ਕੁਦਰਤੀ ਚਮਤਕਾਰ, meaning "natural miracle") is a claimed miracle that occurred at the Golden Temple in Amritsar, Punjab during the colonial-period as per Sikh folk-legend. On 30 April 1877, it is claimed in a popular folk-legend that the shrine was planned to be auctioned by the British but the appearance of ball lightening within the precincts of the shrine complex during amritvela that was witnessed by 400 Sikhs ended the plan. This event is believed by Sikhs to be a miracle attributed to Guru Ram Das to preserve the shrine while the British thought the ball lightning's appearance was a good omen for the rule of Queen Victoria. The lore was published in John Campbell Oman's work Cults, Customs and Superstitions of India (1908). The legend was later recounted in the works of Giani Kirpal Singh and Sahib Singh.

== Inscription ==
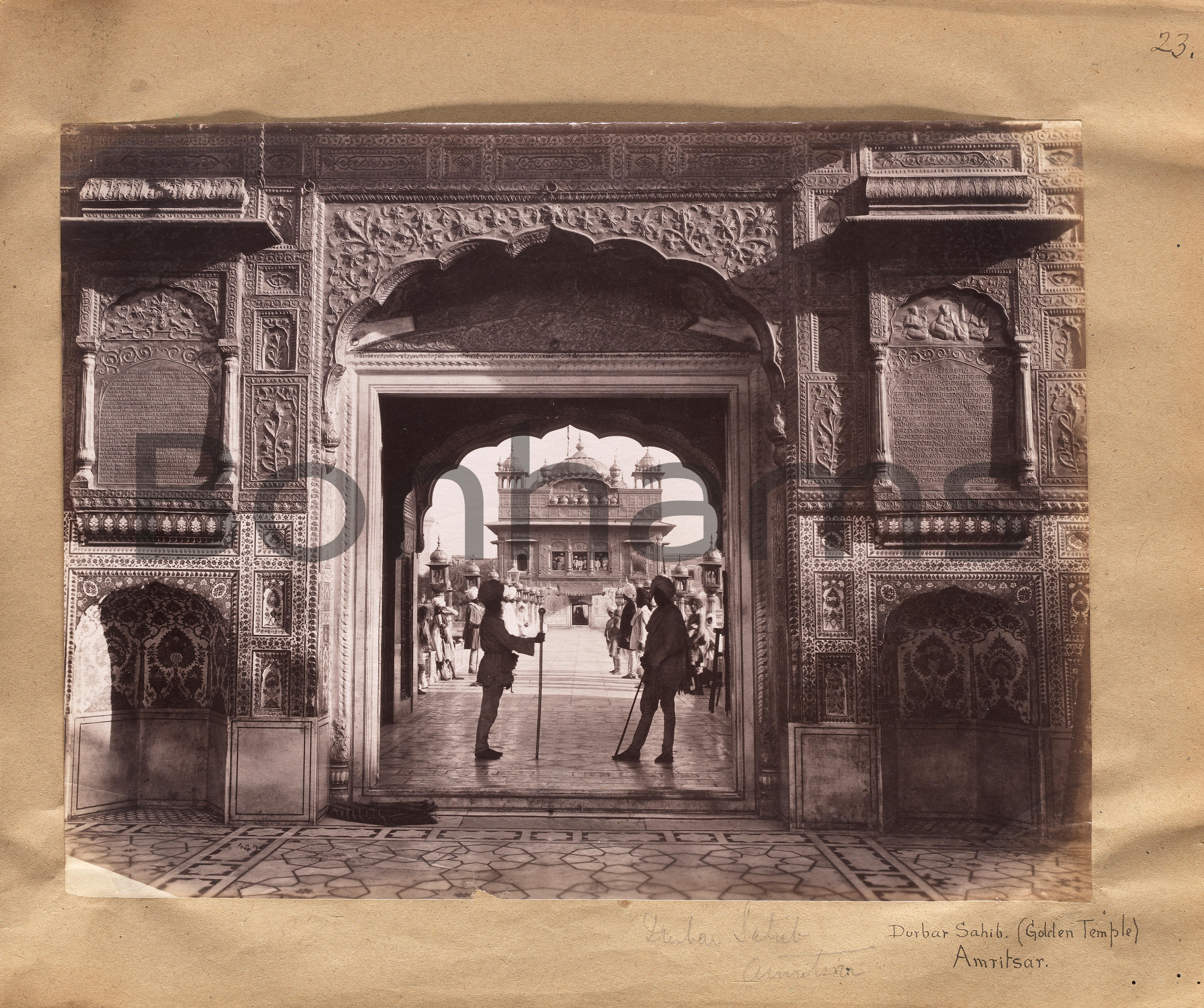
Two inscriptions on the side of the Darshani Deori entry that describe the legend, English on left and Punjabi on right

The story was inscribed in both English and Punjabi (Gurmukhi) within the shrine complex, with the full inscription being as follows (recorded by John Campbell Oman):

It should be generally known that a wonderful event took place lately in the Golden Temple. This building was erected by the great Guru Ram Dass King of Kings and incarnation of Ram who gives blessings and receives worship from all creatures. The following is an account of what occurred on the 30th of April 1877 at 4.30 a.m. about 400 persons according to ancient custom were praying in this Sri Durbar Sahib and listening to psalms whose music was almost drowned by the roar of thunder Suddenly a flash of lightning fell from heaven and entered the holy place by the northern door close to the singers and musicians a ball of fire of about two seers in weight burst in the temple shining with dazzling and terrible brightness. Then immediately after shining before the holy book it returned to the sky through the southern entrance and although it fell with such awful violence and so loud a report yet there was no injury caused to the durbar Sahib or to human life. Therefore all who were assembled joined in ascribing this miracle to Ram Dass who dedicated this temple to Hari. We think it is also a sign of the great prosperity of the British rule also we are thankful to the Empress of India we pray to the creator of all things for a daily increase in their happy influence and for the destruction of all the enemies of her Imperial Majesty. The government inspector waited on the Comr. and informed him of this remarkable event. The following gentlemen viz the Commissioner Rajah Surat Singh Sardar General Gulab Singh Bhagowalia Sardar Mangal Singh Ramgharia and all the worshippers agreed :—That money being collected by friends of the Golden Temple half should be given towards the support of the sacred edifice and half to pay for a dinner to the poor Sufficient money was gathered to pay for seven readings of the Granth Sahib and to feed some thousands of poor people who all expressed their gratitude. This notice is also intended as a memorial of the superintendence of Sardar Mangal Singh over the Sri Darbar Sahib of Hari and as a remembrance of the miracle of Guru Ram Dass and the prosperity of our rulers which we pray may last to the end of time B.K

— Inscription documenting the event at the Golden Temple, recorded by John Campbell Oman in Cults, Customs and Superstitions of India (1908), pp. 99–100

The English inscription was formerly found on the left-side of the entry of the Darshani Darwaza but Jagjit Singh (1935) notes it to have been removed at some point with only a vernacular translation remaining.
