= Vladimir Rojansky =

Vladimir Borisovich Rojansky
- Born: April 9, 1900; Bologoye, Russian Empire
- Died: March 4, 1981 (aged 80); Claremont, California, US
- Education: Whitman College; University of Oregon (M.A.); University of Minnesota (Ph.D.)
- Known for: Antimatter
- Scientific career
- Fields: Physics
- Workplaces: Washington University in St. Louis; Union College; Harvey Mudd College

Signature
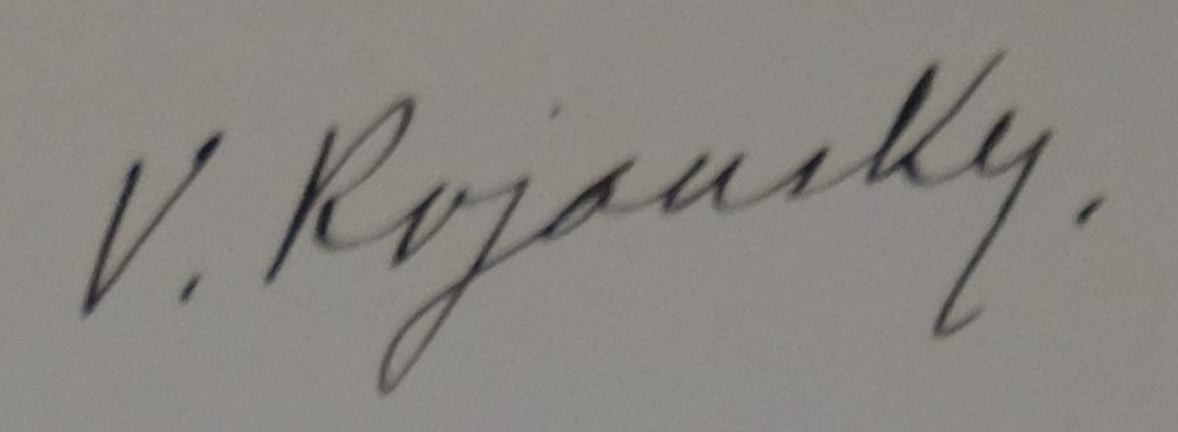

Vladimir Borisovich Rojansky (April 9, 1900 – March 6, 1981) was an American physicist, author and educator. He was born in Bologoye, Russian Empire. His father was a railroad construction engineer and one of his grandfathers was a general.

At the outbreak of the Russian Civil War (August 8, 1918) he enlisted in the dragoons of the White Army. Within a month he was wounded in action and was hospitalized until the end of January. During the war his regiment retreated across Siberia to the Far Eastern Republic. There he was discharged as an officer in April 1921.

That year he crossed the Pacific to America. He graduated from Whitman College in 1924, from the University of Oregon (M.A. 1925), and from the University of Minnesota (Ph.D. 1928). His thesis was one of the first to employ the modern form of quantum mechanics. It was supervised by John van Vleck, who later won a Nobel Prize. In 1938 he published Introductory Quantum Mechanics, one of the earliest textbooks on the subject.

He taught at Washington University in St. Louis (1928-1930), Union College (1930-1955), and Harvey Mudd College (1965-1972).

From 1955 to 1965 he worked in the aerospace industry, first at the Ramo-Wooldridge Corporation and later at the Space Technology Laboratories of TRW.

== Interest in contraterrene matter (antimatter) ==
In a 1935 paper, Rojansky coined the terms "terrene" and "contraterrene" to describe, respectively, ordinary matter and the substance now commonly known as "antimatter," in which "atoms consist of negative nuclei surrounded by positrons."

In a subsequent paper, he speculated that some comets may consist of antimatter. This suggestion was embraced by some meteorite specialists, and also found its way into science fiction stories.

== Personal ==
His marriage (1926-1958) to Betty Lantz produced a daughter. After his wife's death from Parkinson's disease he married (1958-1981) Mildred Black.

His digestion never recovered from his war wounds.

== Books ==
- Introductory Quantum Mechanics (1938)
- Electromagnetic Fields and Waves (1971)
