= Magnetophosphene =

Flashes of light seen due to a magnetic field

Magnetophosphenes are flashes of light (phosphenes) that are seen when one is subjected to a changing magnetic field such as when in an MRI. This changing field causes current within the retina or visual cortex resulting in the illusion of light. In one series, 8 out of 1023 people having an MRI experienced flashing lights.

Magnetophosphenes have been proposed as an explanation for ball lightning.
