= Electron-hole droplets =

Electron-hole droplets are a condensed phase of excitons in semiconductors. The droplets are formed at low temperatures and high exciton densities, the latter of which can be created with intense optical excitation or electronic excitation in a p-n junction.

== Discovery ==
Evidence for electron-hole droplets was first observed by J. R. Haynes of Bell Labs in 1966, who observed a frequency shift in the spectrum radiated by silicon at low temperatures (~3 K). The shift was attributed to the recombination of a bound state of two excitons (electron-hole pairs). V. M. Asnin and A. A. Rogachev discovered metallic conduction in germanium at low temperatures when the density of excitons exceeded the amount required to transition into a metallic state.
