= George Bekefi =

Plasma physicist

Professor George Bekefi
- Born: 14 March 1925; Prague, Czechoslovakia
- Died: 17 August 1995 (aged 70); Brookline, Massachusetts, U.S.

Academic work
- Discipline: Physics
- Sub-discipline: Plasma

George Bekefi (14 March 1925 in Prague – 17 August 1995 in Brookline, Massachusetts) was a plasma physicist, a professor at MIT, and an inventor.

In 1939 Bekefi emigrated from Czechoslovakia to England by means of a British government program to help Jewish children. He received in 1948 a B.S. in science and mathematics from University College London. In 1948 he went to Montreal as an instructor in the physics department of McGill University, where he earned an M.S. in 1950 and a Ph.D. in 1952. At McGill he became a research associate and then an assistant professor, leaving in 1957 to join MIT's Plasma Physics Group in the Research Laboratory of Electronics. Bekefi remained at MIT for the remainder of his career. In MIT's physics department he became in 1961 an assistant professor, in 1964 an associate professor, and in 1967 a full professor, retiring in the summer of 1995 as professor emeritus.

In 1976, he and a staff researcher, Dr. Thaddeus Orzechowski, developed a source of radiation producing bursts of microwaves about 50 times as strong as the largest microwave generators then in use. More recently, he worked to develop free-electron lasers as power sources in high-frequency bands. Such lasers have wide applications in communications, bulk chemical processing and fusion experiments, as well as cutting, drilling and welding. He received seven patents, wrote more than 180 scientific papers and was the co-author of three books. (Note: The preceding quotation from the New York Times obituary should have "author or co-author" instead of "co-author" because Bekefi was the sole author of Radiation Processes in Plasmas.)

Bekefi guided about 50 graduate students to their M.S. and Ph.D. degrees. Upon his death from leukemia, he was survived by a wife, a son, and a daughter.

== Awards and honors ==
- Guggenheim Fellow for the academic year 1972–1973 (spent at the University of Paris and the Hebrew University in Jerusalem)
- Fellow of the American Physical Society and chairman of the Society's Division of Plasma Physics in 1978
- Institute of Electrical and Electronics Engineers' Plasma Science and Applications Prize in 1989
- Gold Honorary Medal for Merit in the field of Physics Sciences from the Academy of Sciences of the Czech Republic in 1993
- Free-Electron Laser Award by the American Physical Society in 1995

== Selected publications ==
- Radiation Processes in Plasmas. 1966.
- as editor and co-author: Principles of Laser Plasmas. 1976.
- with A. H. Barrett: Bekefi, George; Barrett, Alan Hildreth (1977). Electromagnetic Vibrations, Waves and Radiation. MIT Press. ISBN 9780262520478.
