= Woody's Knob =

Mountain in North Carolina, United States

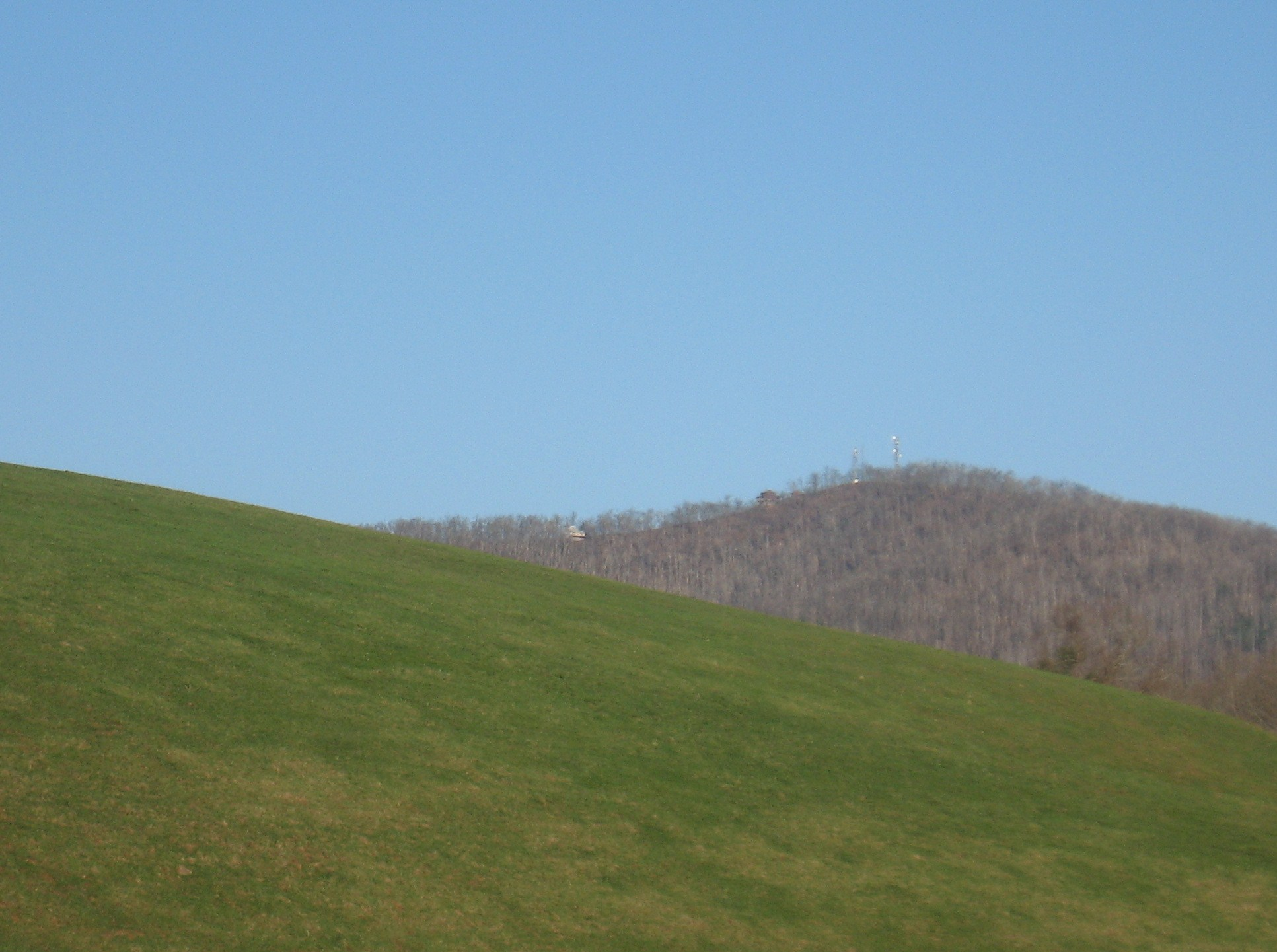
- Woody's Knob From NC-226N

Highest point
- Elevation: 4,177 ft (1,273 m) NAVD 88
- Coordinates: 35°52′48″N 82°06′15″W

Geography
- Location within North Carolina
- Parent range: Blue Ridge Mountains
- Topo map(s): USGS Spruce Pine, NC

Geology
- Rock age: c. 3/4 Billion years

Climbing
- Easiest route: Firetower Rd.

Woody's Knob (Charlie Woody Mountain), at an elevation of 4,170 feet, is a summit or "knob" in the Blue Ridge Mountains and one of the highest points in the unincorporated village of Little Switzerland and in Mitchell County, North Carolina.

== Geography ==
Described by North Carolina Geodetic Survey of 1982, the summit of Woody's Knob is located approximately 2.10 statute miles (3.4 km) north northwest of the village of Little Switzerland and 3.25 statute miles (5.2 km) southwest of Spruce Pine, North Carolina. The spike station is a standard NCGS bronze disk stamped "SPRUCE PINE NCDOT 4170 ft" set into the top of a round concrete monument 30 cm in diameter projecting 5 cm above ground located directly underneath the Spruce Pine Lookout and Firetower, which was constructed in 1958 as part of the Forest Service's efforts to detect woodland fires. Unmanned and standing 68.9 feet in height, today it serves as a communications transmission facility.

By vehicle, the mountain top is 5.1 statute miles from uptown Little Switzerland and the Blue Ridge Parkway. Approaching Woody's Knob on Old Chestnut Grove Church Road, Neideiger Road, Lake Laurel and Emerald Mine Road; gravel paved Firetower Road terminates at the grass covered summit. Along with the firetower mentioned above, at the mountain top stands four concrete block electric and generator houses, a wooden outhouse, one micro-wave tower, numerous vhf and uhf receivers and transceivers, a U.S. Forestry Service air monitoring station and a 180' high Homeland Security/North Carolina Highway Patrol Communications Viper Tower.

== Waypoints ==
From the firetower and above the tree line, a 360° panorama, covering no less than 4 counties, can be seen. To the north northeast are the white feldspar cliffs of Chalk Mountain above Spruce Pine, North Carolina. Grandfather Mountain (5964 ft.), Hawksbill (4020 ft.) and Table Rock Mountain (4100 ft.) can be seen towards the east with Marion, the Blue Ridge Parkway and Lynn Gap to the south south east. From south to north rise the spruce and fir covered eastern slopes of the Black Mountains comprising at least a dozen peaks along the visible ridge with Mt. Mitchell (6684 ft.) following close to a dozen Rocks, Mounts, Gaps, Hills, Peaks and Cones northwards terminating with Celo Knob (6327 ft.) abruptly cresting downwards to Burnsville. Due west downhill is Emerald Mine Road, Bushy Creek, Crabtree Mt. and Hoot Owl Mine. In the valley beyond is Micaville and the South Toe River, with Burnsville and eastern Yancey County towards the horizon. Northwards, completing the 360° view, the Roan Highlands Massif stretches along the Mitchell County, NC and Carter County, TN state line.

== Climate ==
The weather atop Woody's Knob ranges from one extreme to another. During the summer months, early morning fog is frequent and daytime temperatures average in the low 70's to low 50's at night. Wintertime, temperatures easily dip into double digits below zero. Add to that, a wind chill factor caused by the prevailing wintertime north westerlies which have been measured from atop the firetower at hurricane-force winds. Ice storms can occur as early as late November which can make traveling to the top of the mountain a challenge. Average rainfall on the mountaintop is 58 inches and normal snowfall is 20 to 25 inches annually. Springtime arrives late as flower buds and leaves aren't in full bloom until after late April. Rhododendron, mountain laurel and wildflowers are blooming by mid May and blackberries and strawberries are ready to pick by mid summer while fall colors on the mountain are at their most brilliant by the last week of October.

== Flora and fauna ==
Wildlife in the area include white-tailed deer, wild turkey, bobcat, various species of hummingbirds, cardinals, hawks, owls, bats, eastern gray squirrels, southern flying squirrels, eastern box turtles, eastern diamondback rattlesnakes and scarlet kingsnakes, salamanders and an occasional appearance of a black bear with cubs or a golden eagle.

== Gallery ==
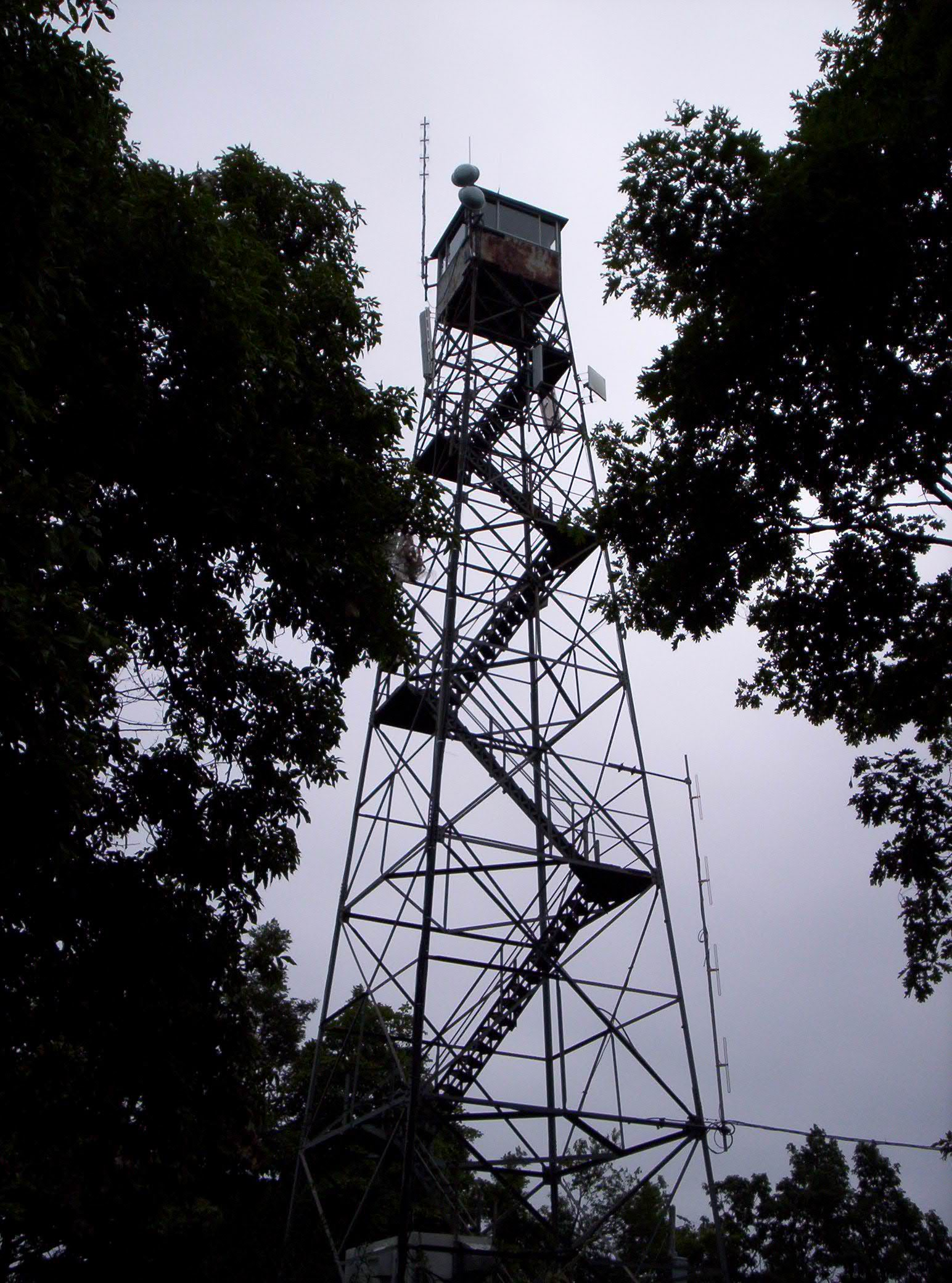
Fire Tower at Summit

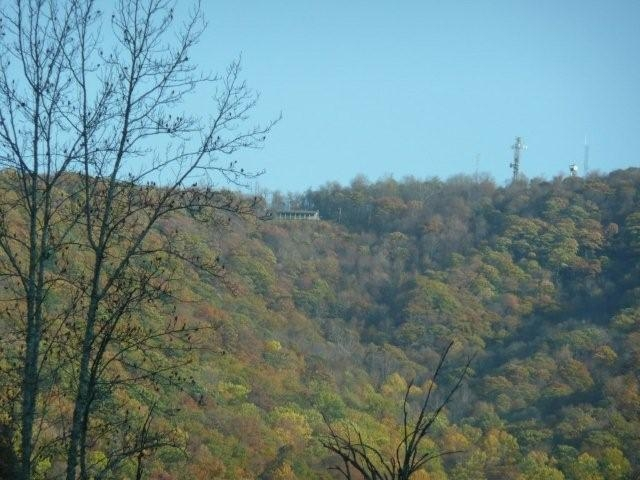
Western Slope & Towers at Summit

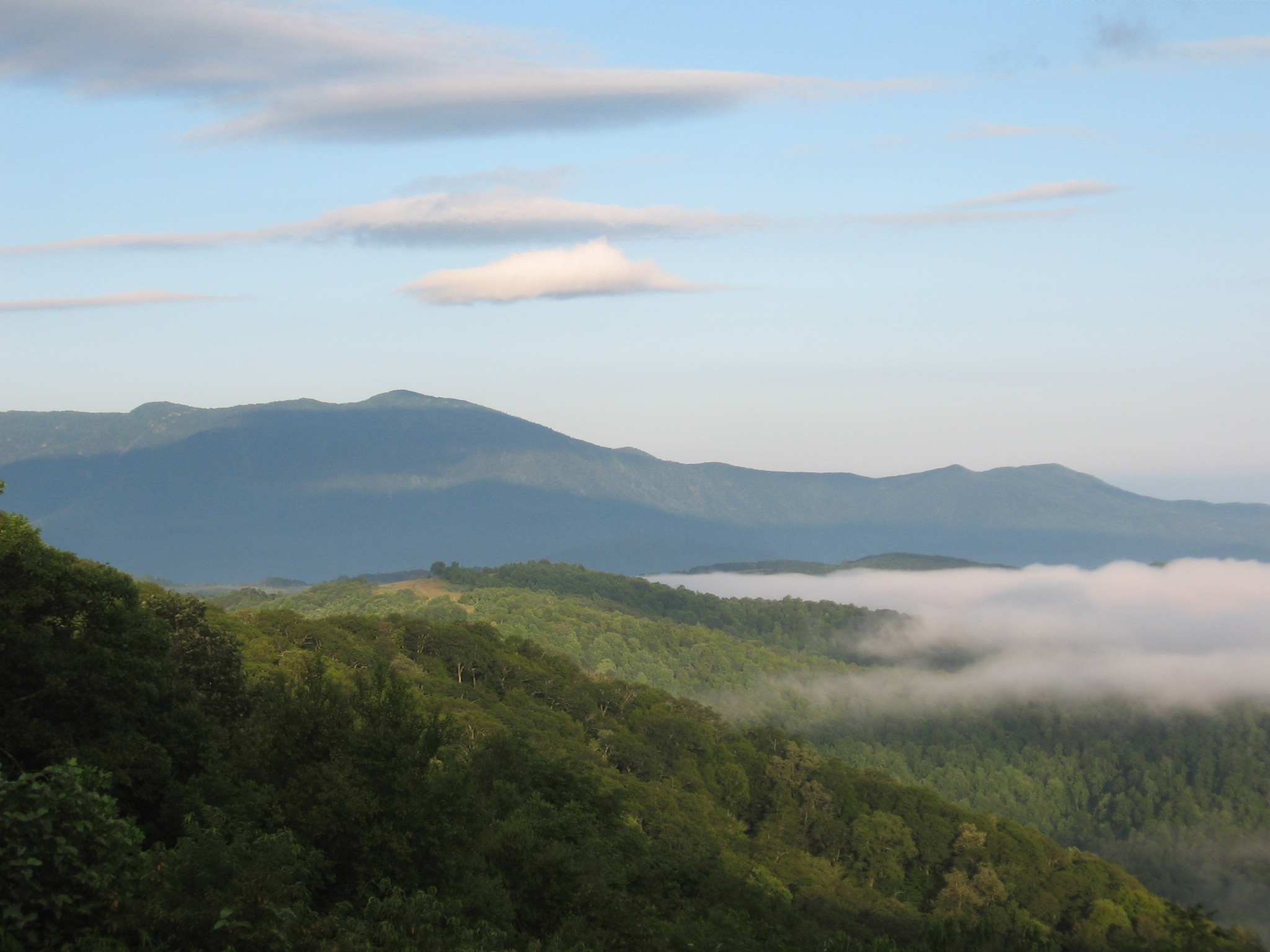
Celo Knob (6,327') Southwest View

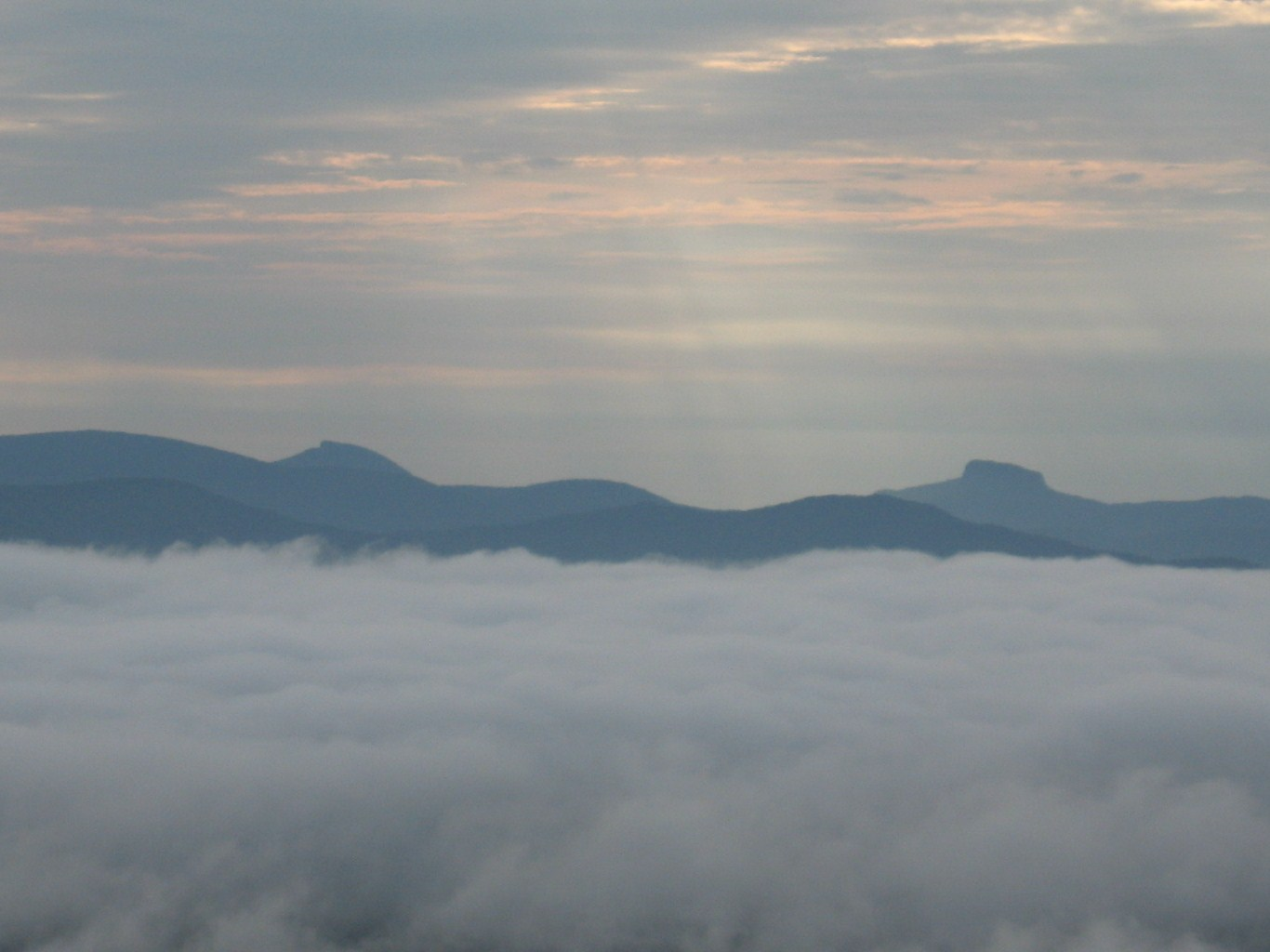
Sunrise Behind Hawksbill & Tablerock

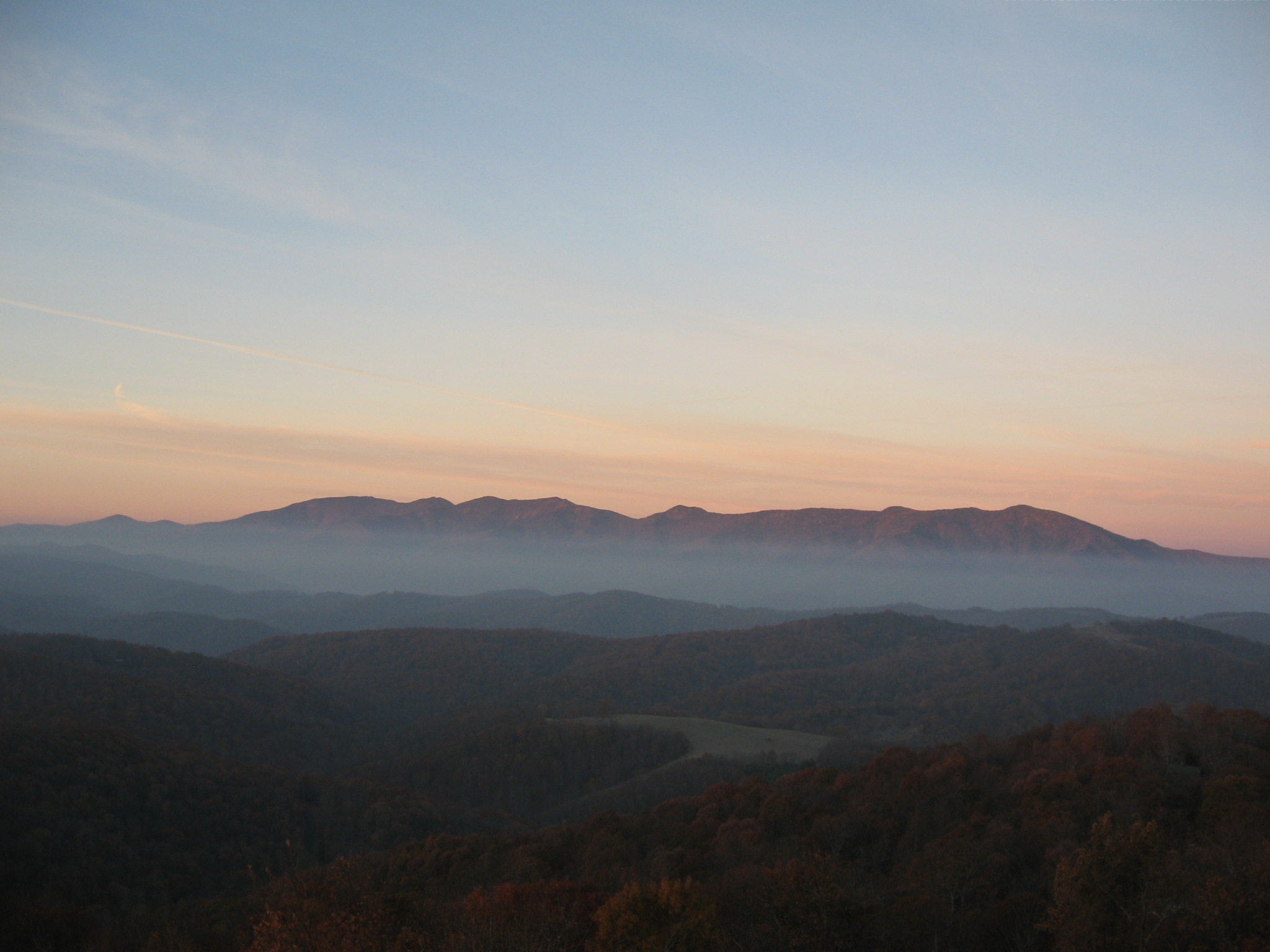
Black Mountains (Fall)

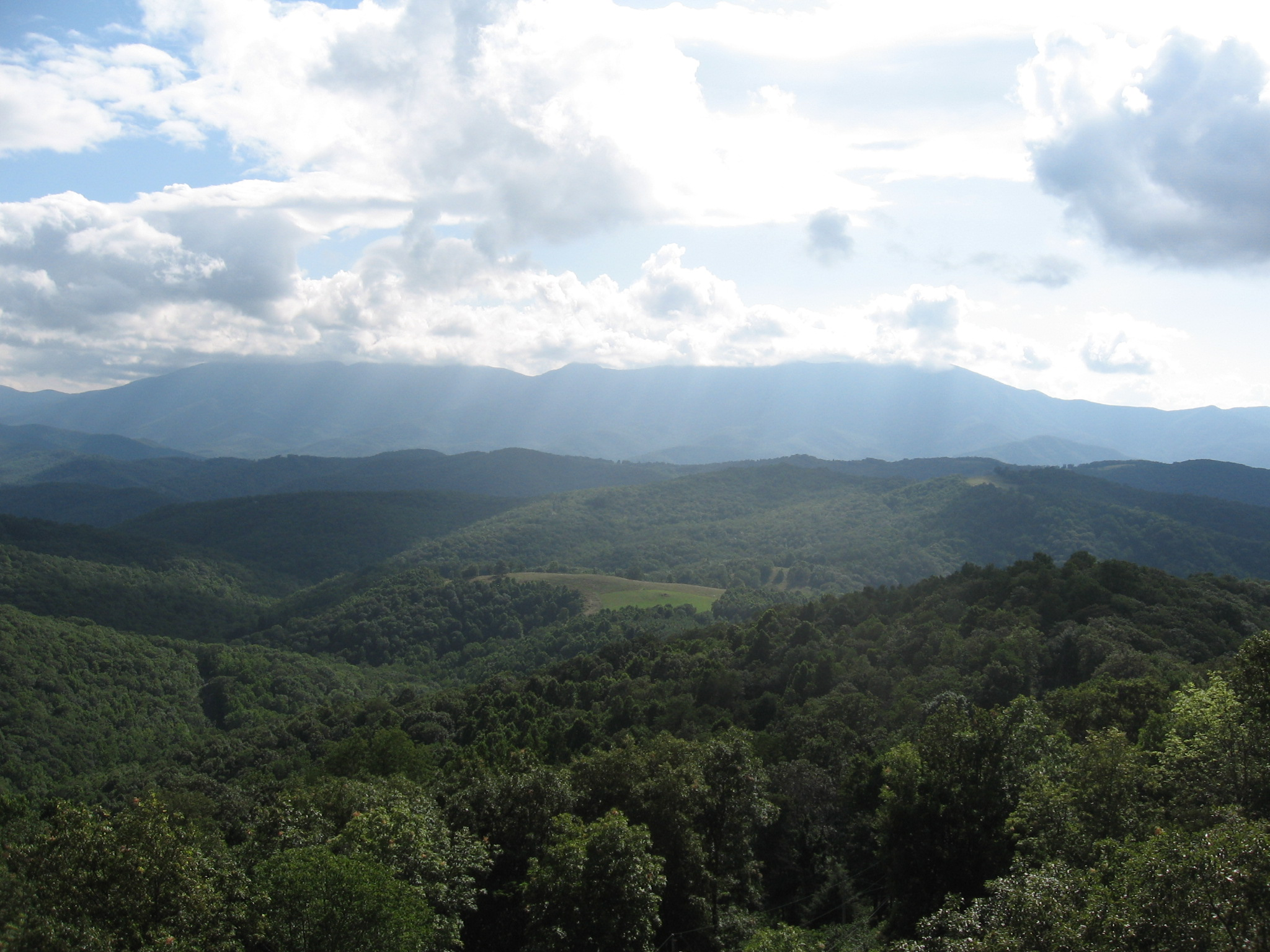
Black Mountains (Summer)

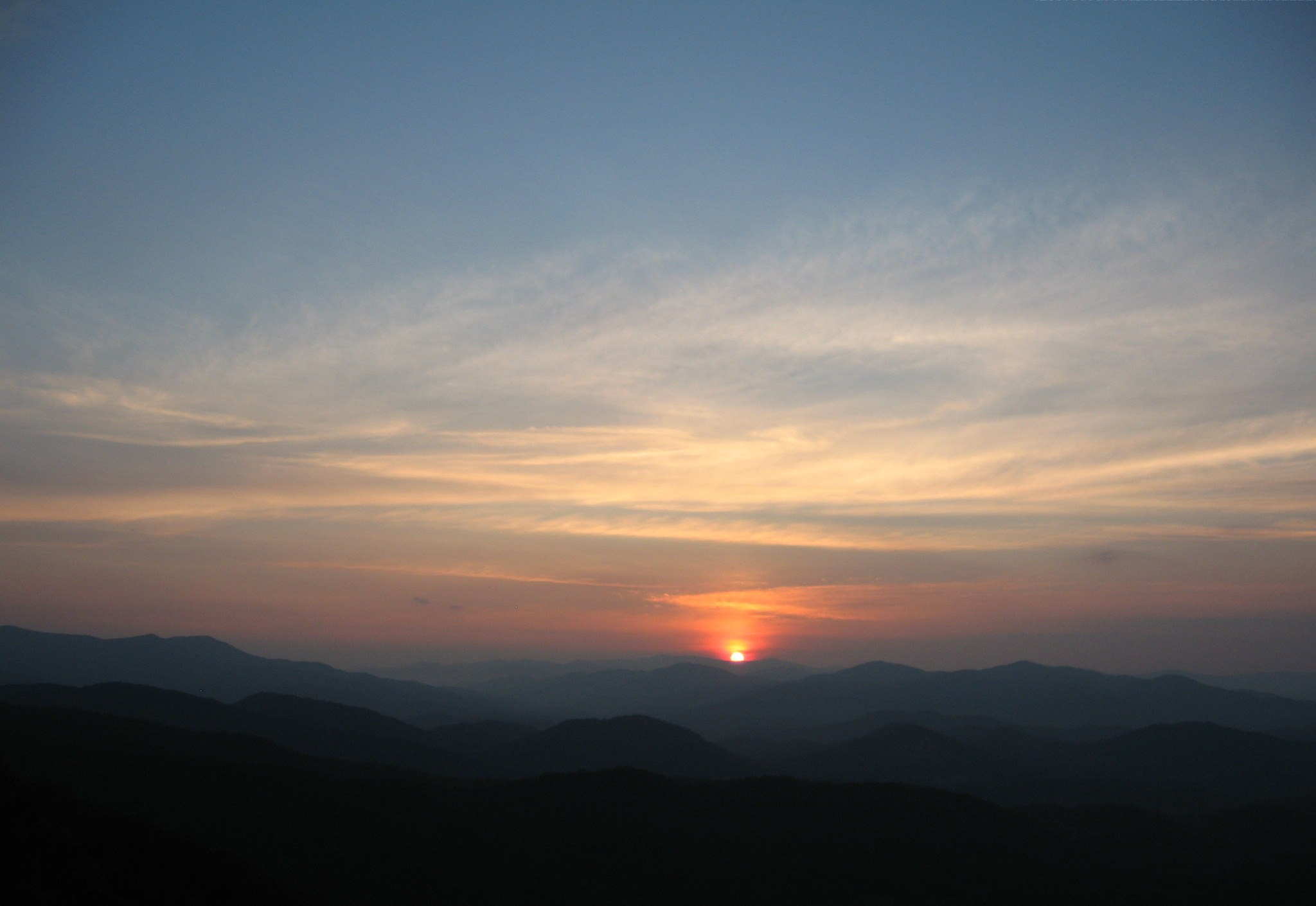
Sunset

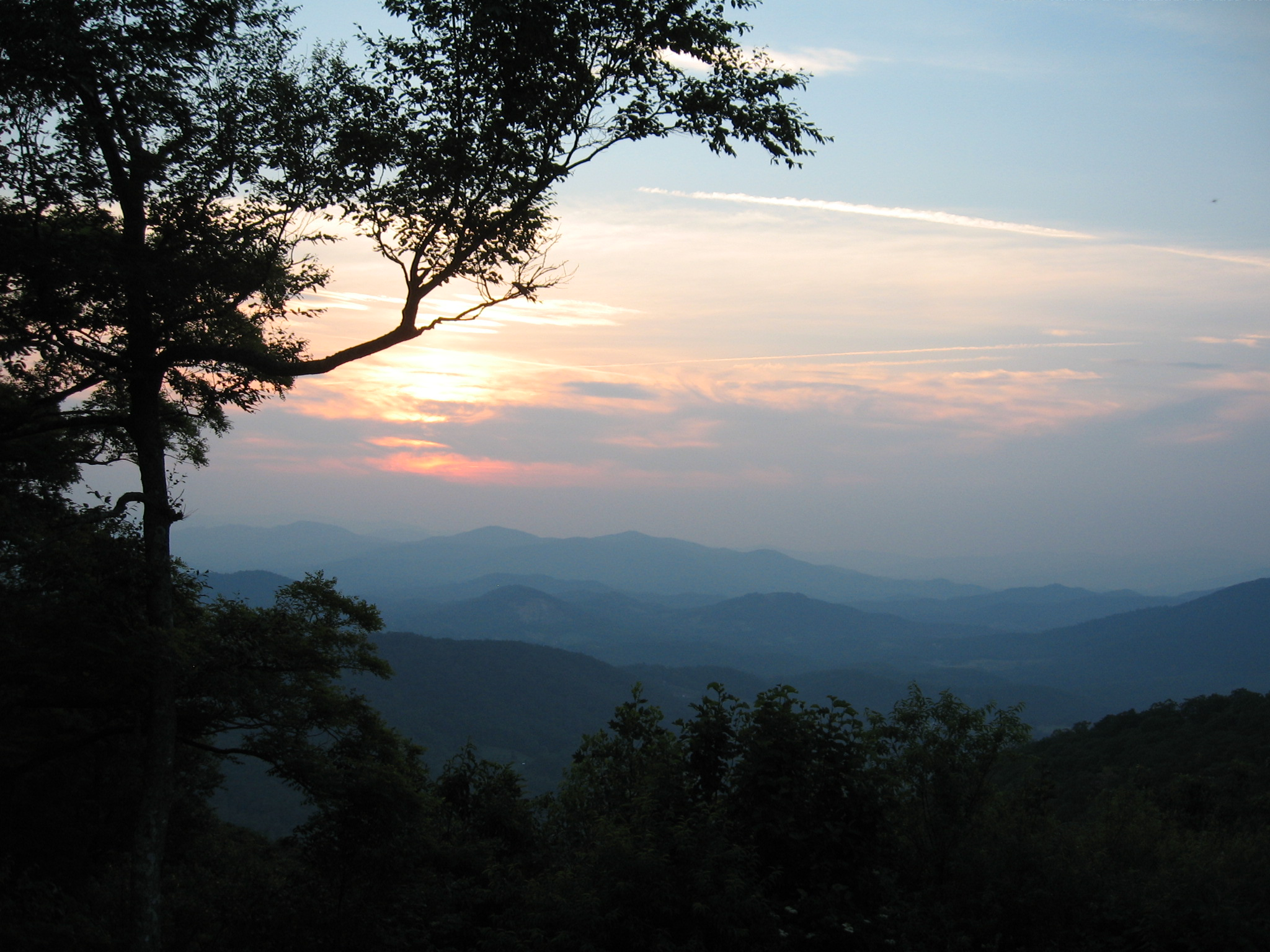
Sunset

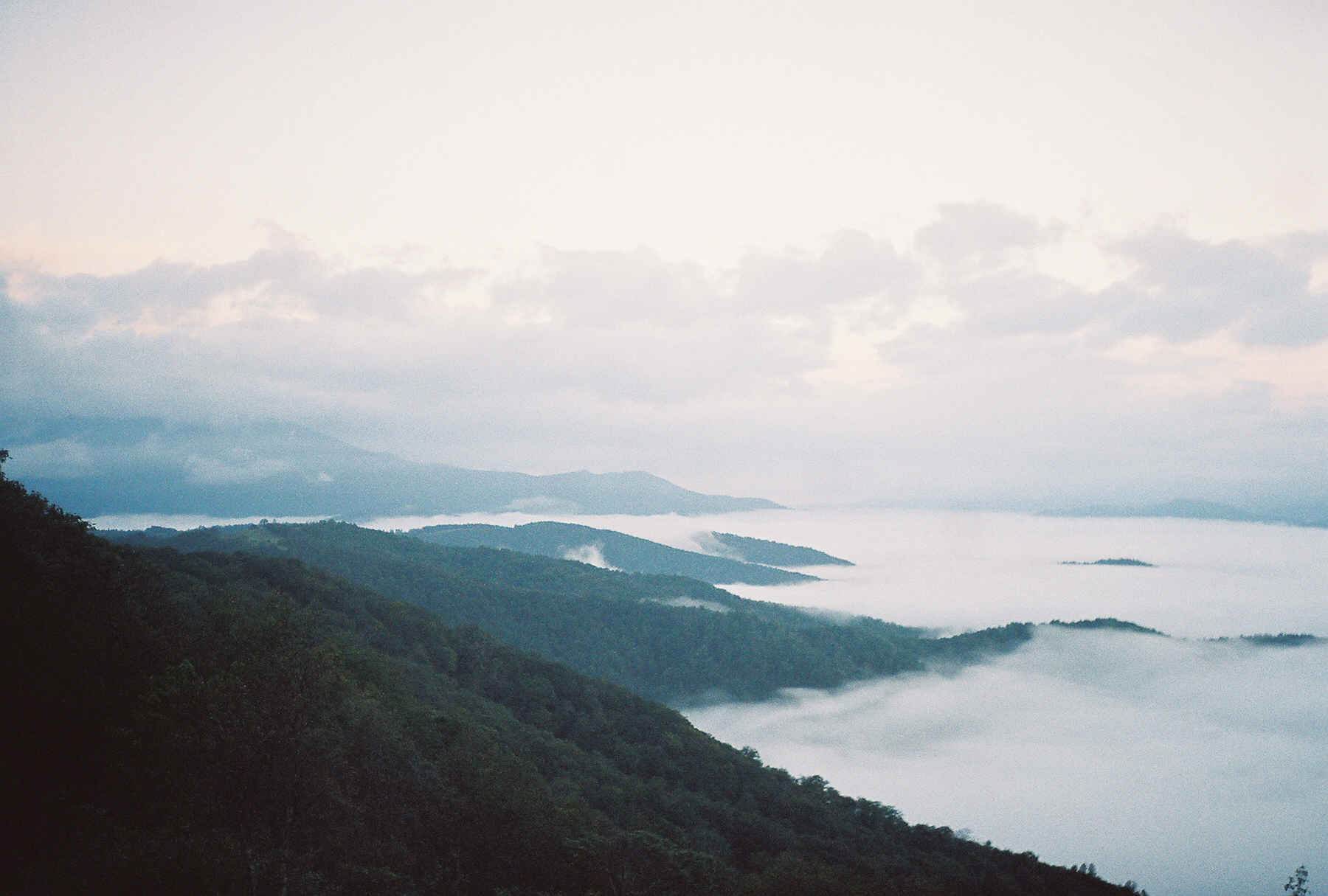
West-Southwest View Towards Burnsville

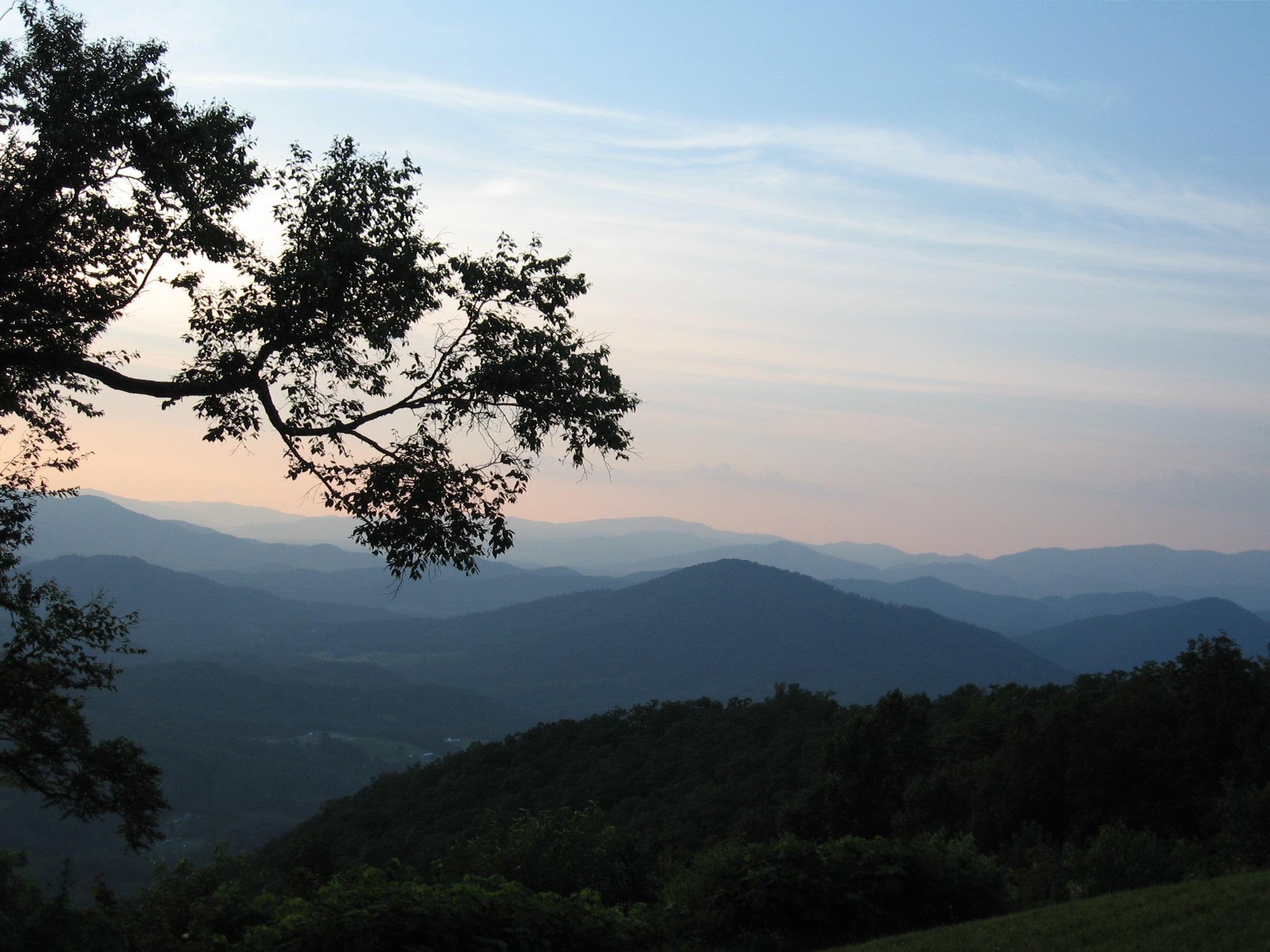
Boone Knob; Northwest View

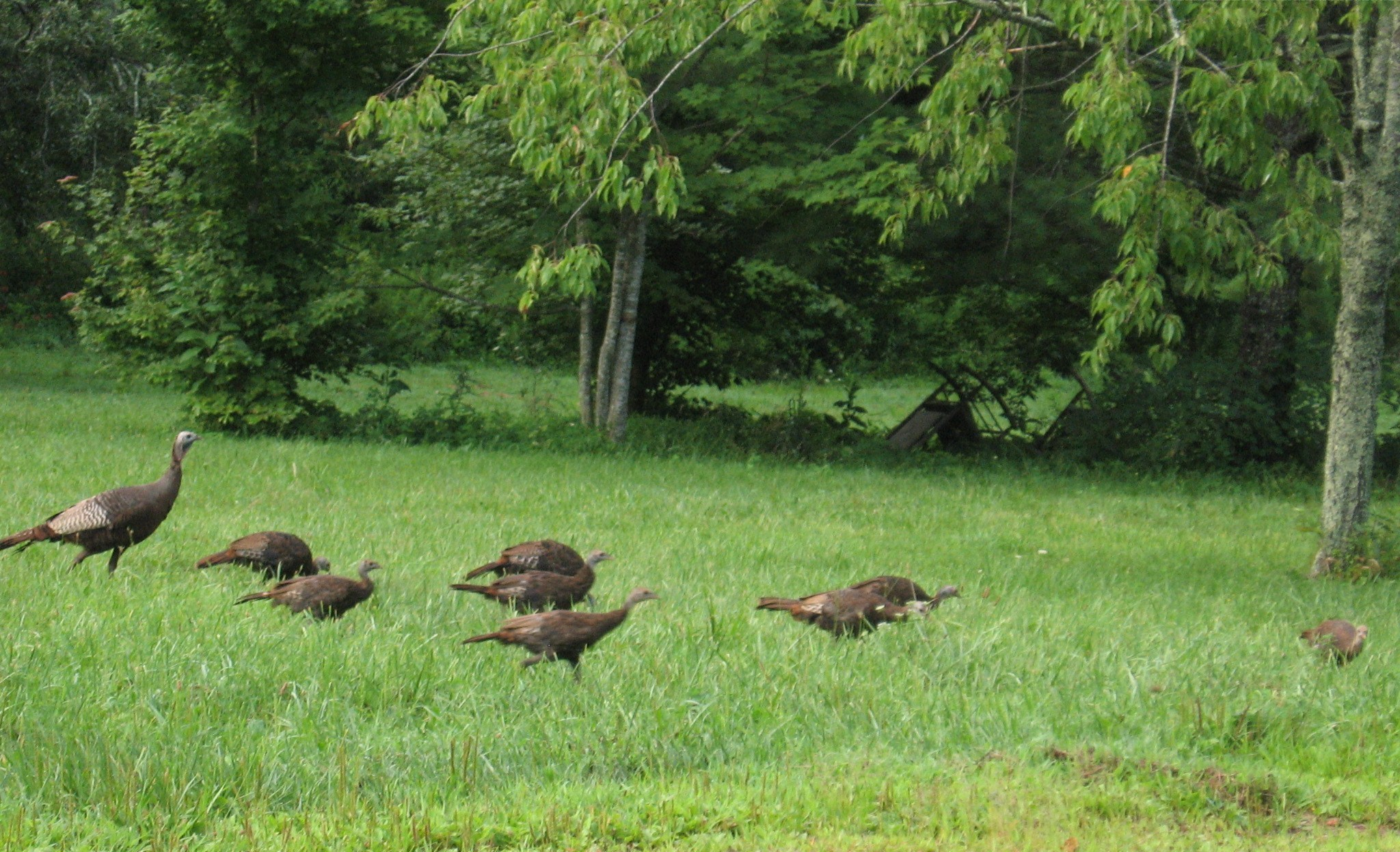
Local Population

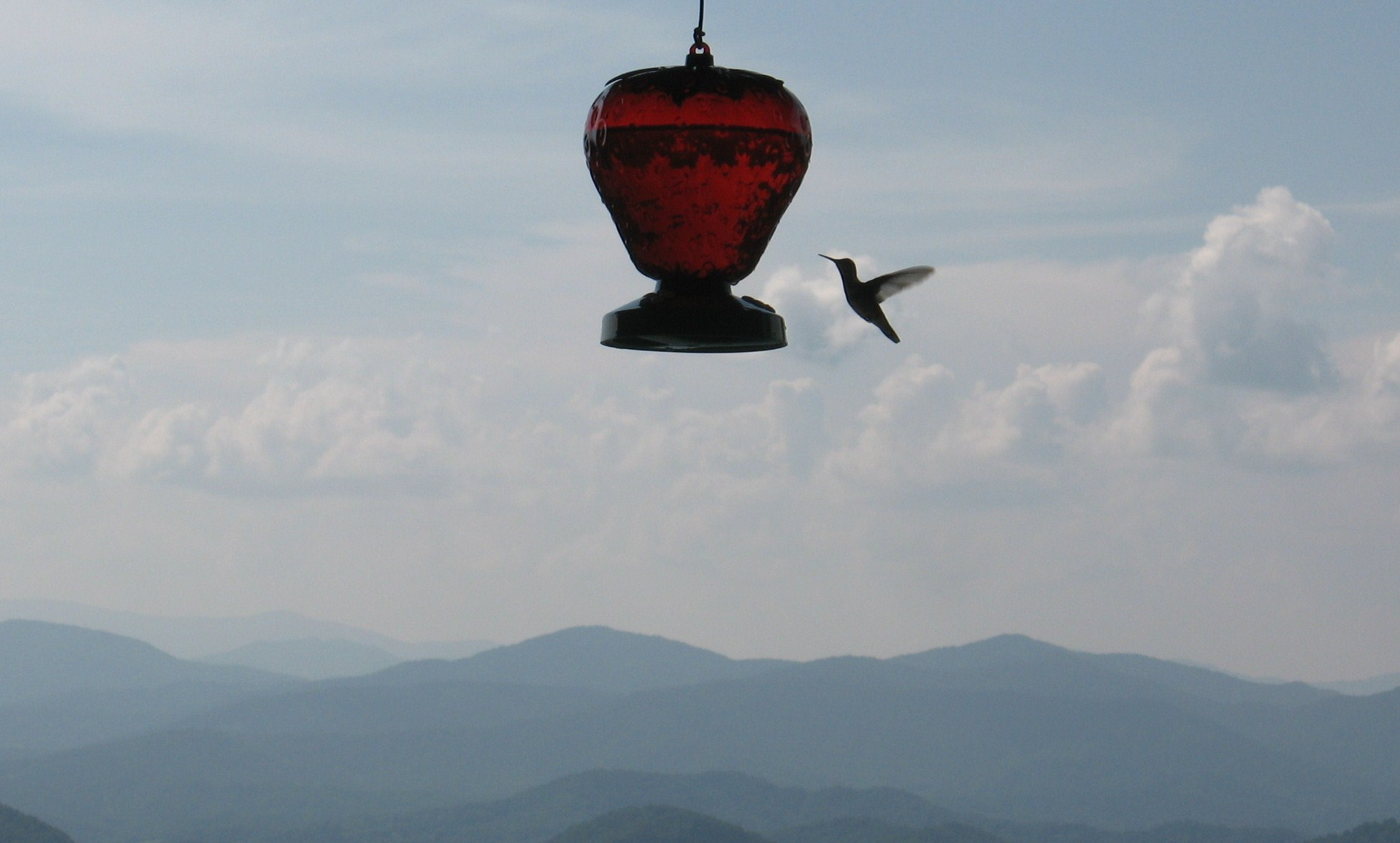
Local Population

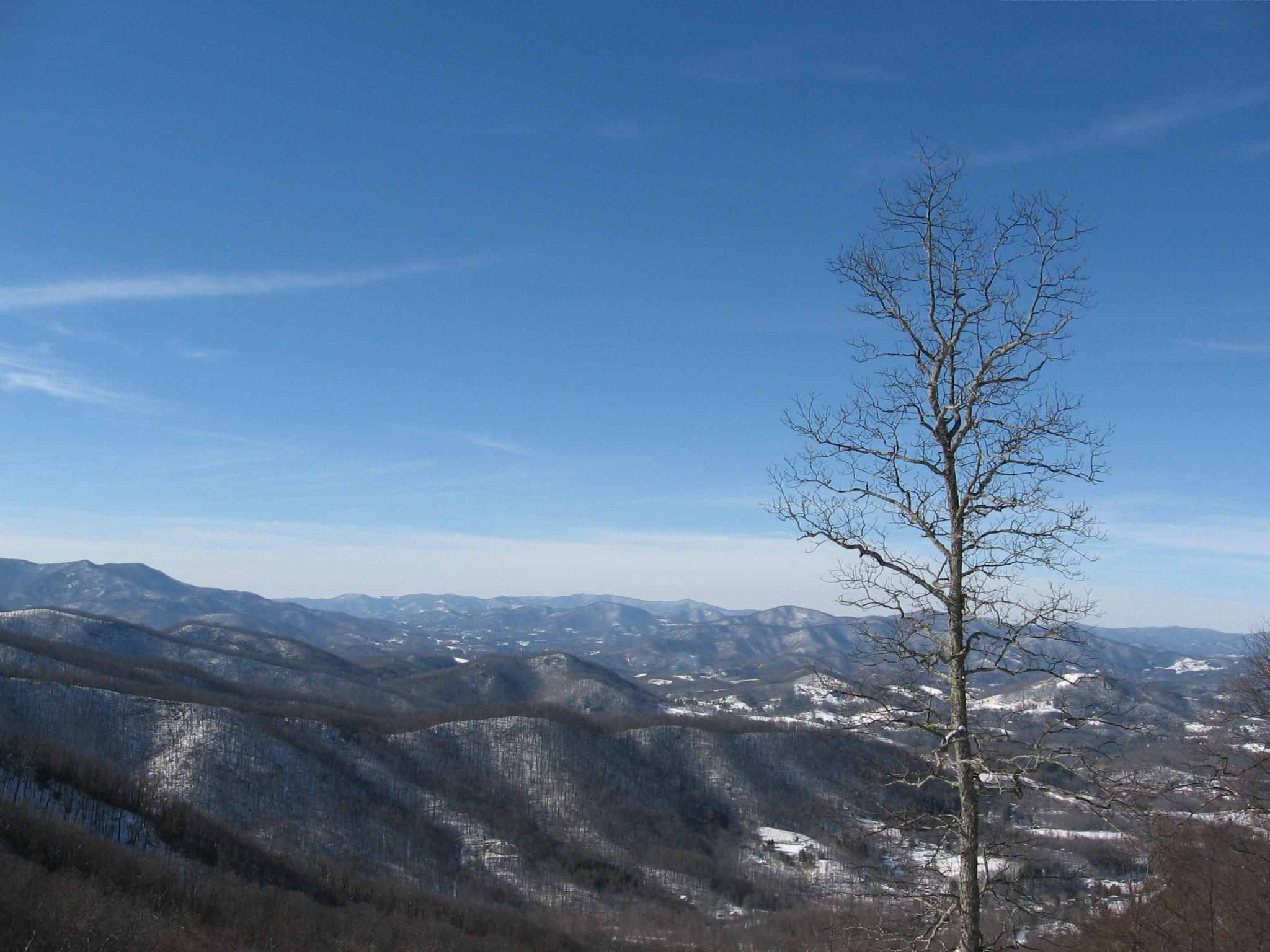
Snowfall; January, 2011

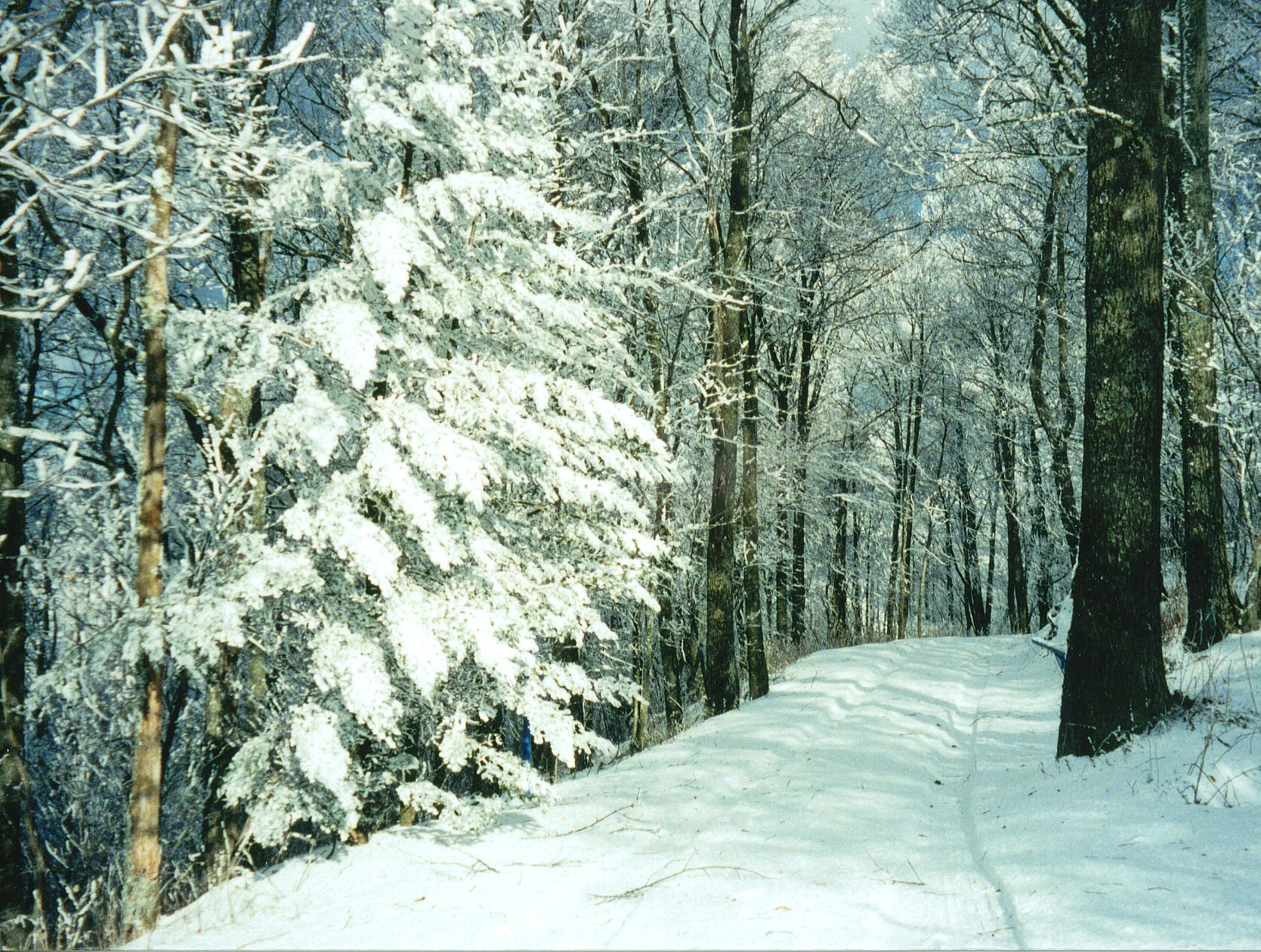
Snowfall at Summit

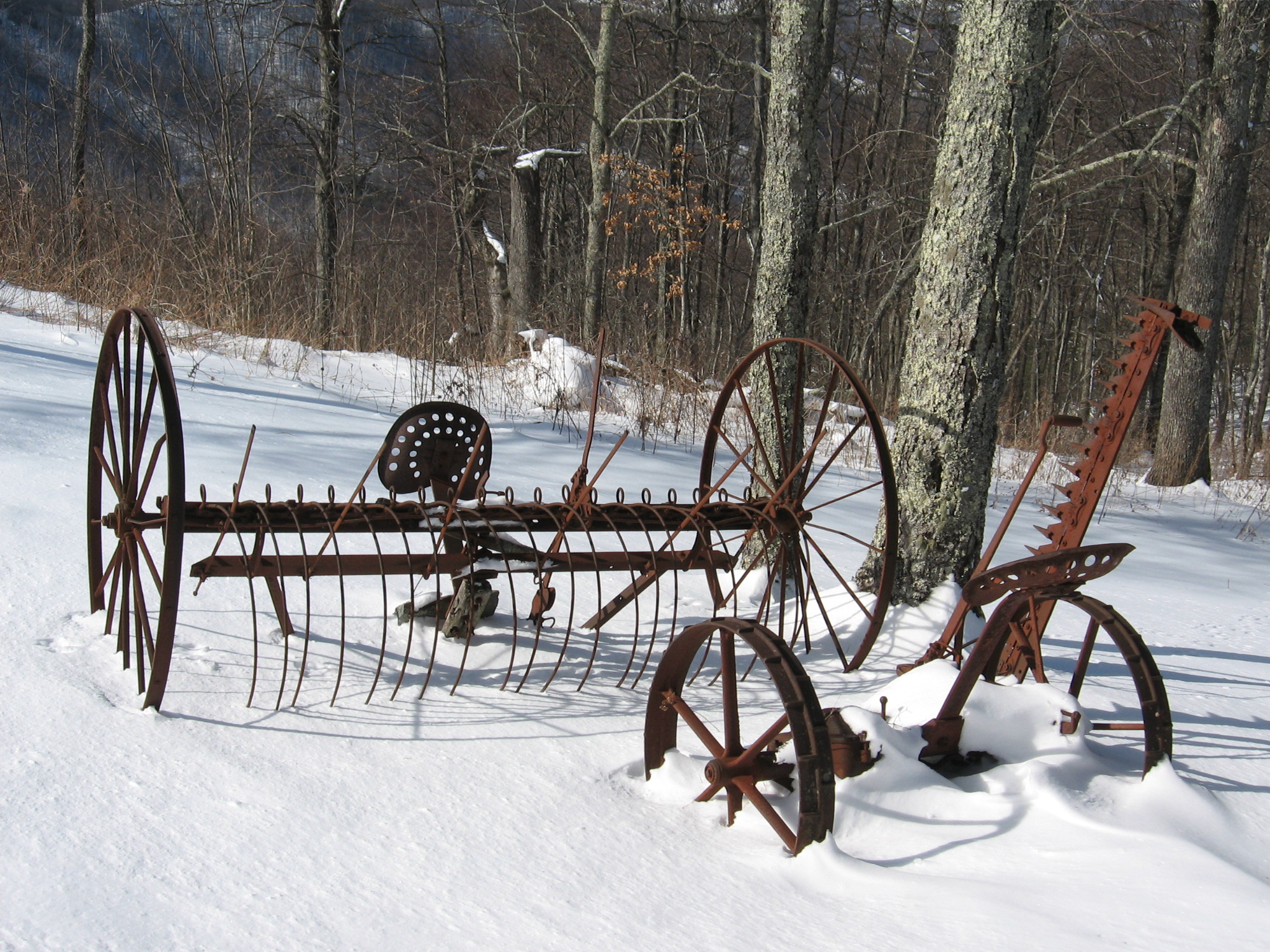
Farm Equipment

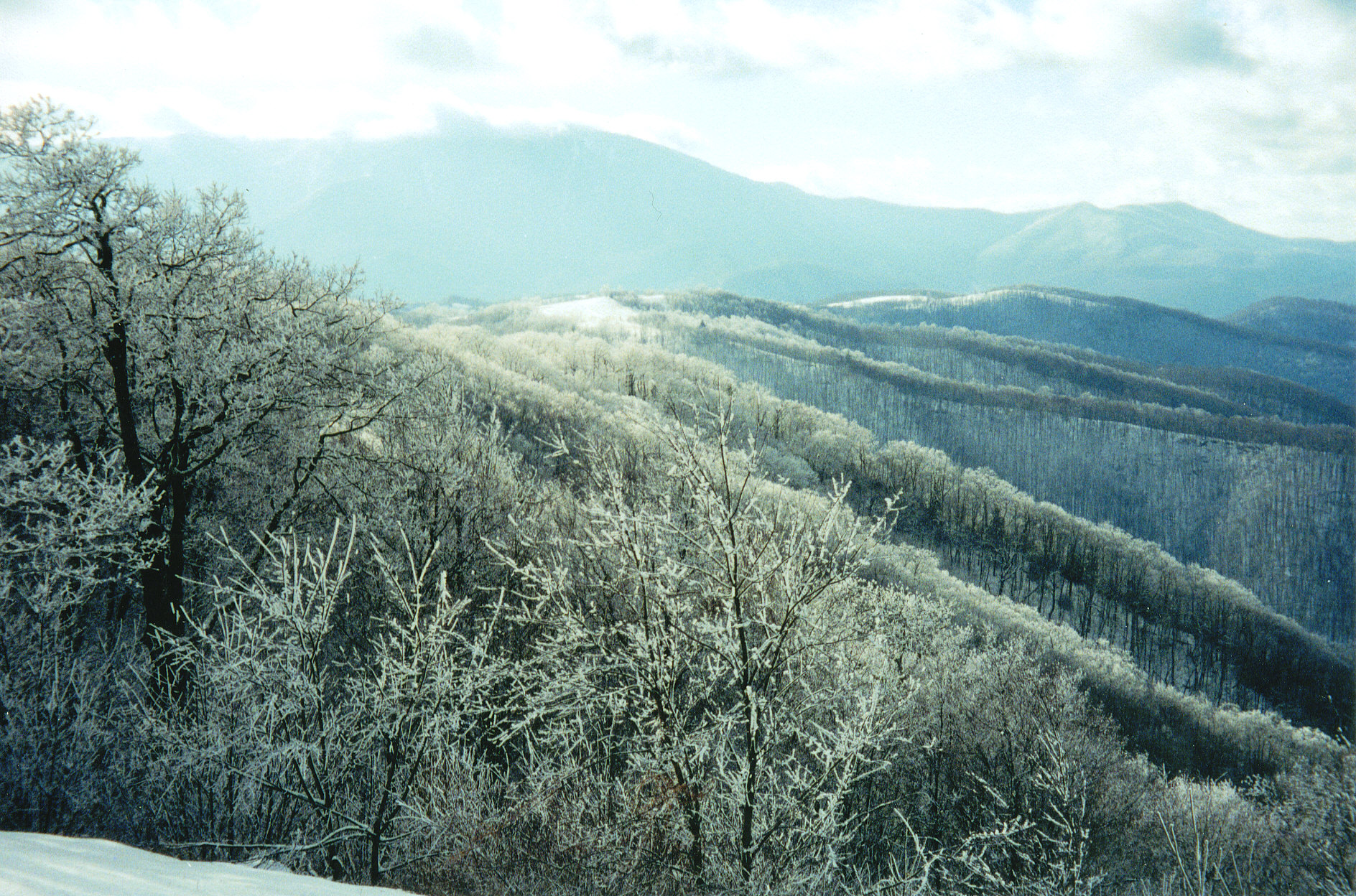
Rime Ice

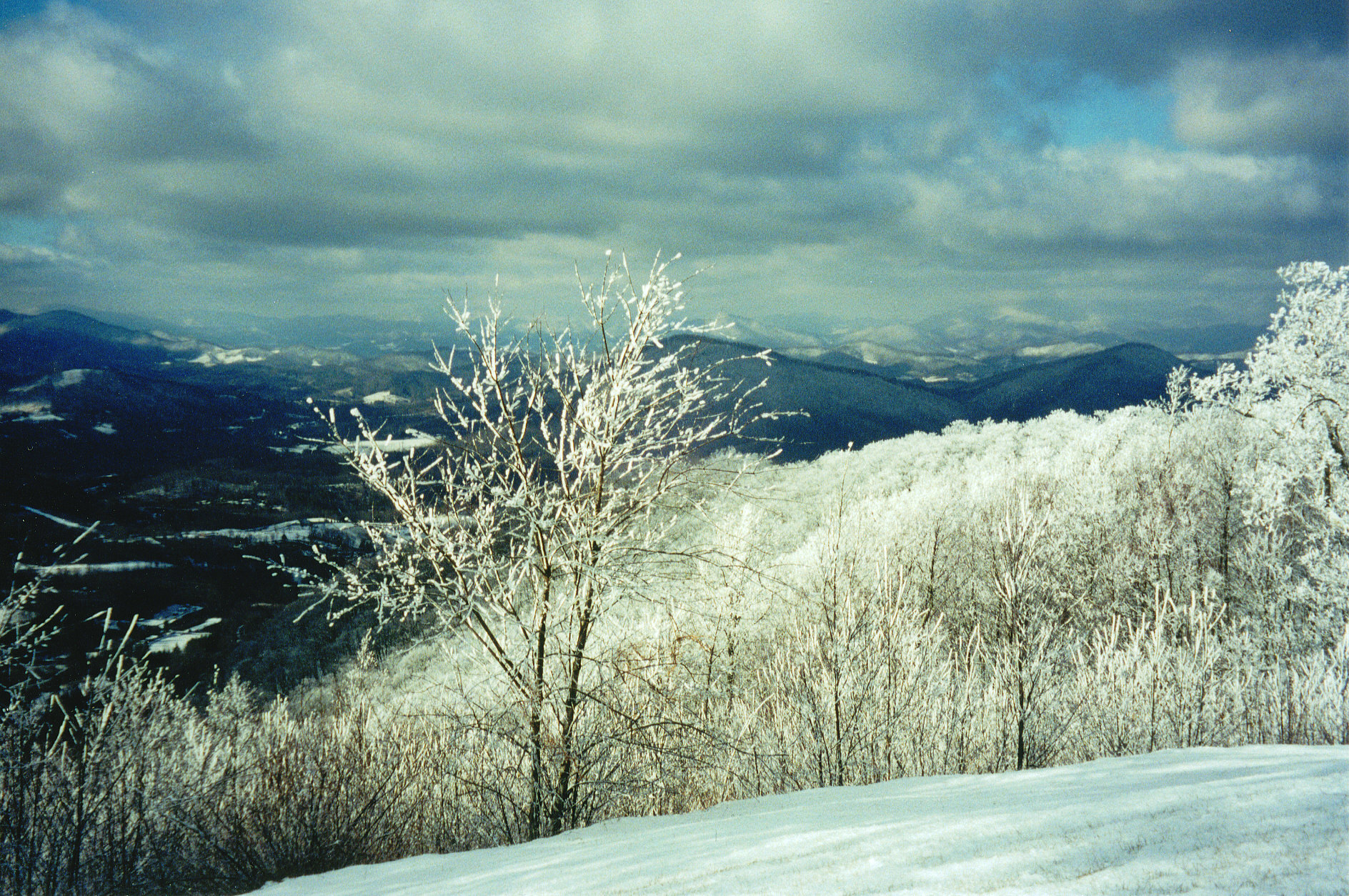
Rime Ice

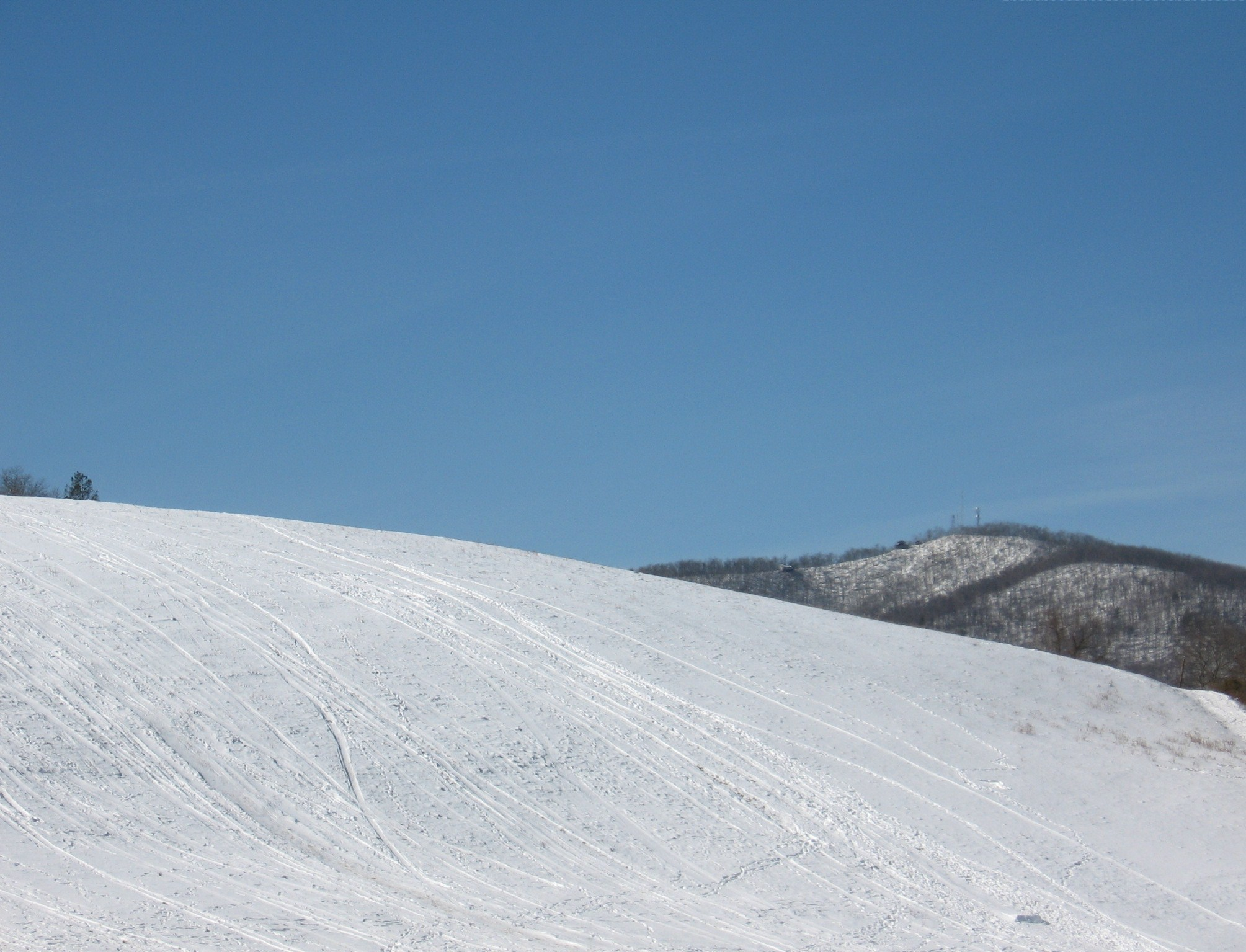
Woody's Knob From 221

== See also ==
- Little Switzerland, North Carolina
- Spruce Pine, North Carolina
- Blue Ridge Parkway
- Crabtree Falls (North Carolina)
- Grandfather Mountain
- Black Mountains (North Carolina)
- Table Rock (North Carolina)
- Linville Gorge Wilderness
- Mt. Mitchell
