= Church of the Resurrection (Little Switzerland, North Carolina) =

Historic church in North Carolina, United States

- U.S. National Register of Historic Places
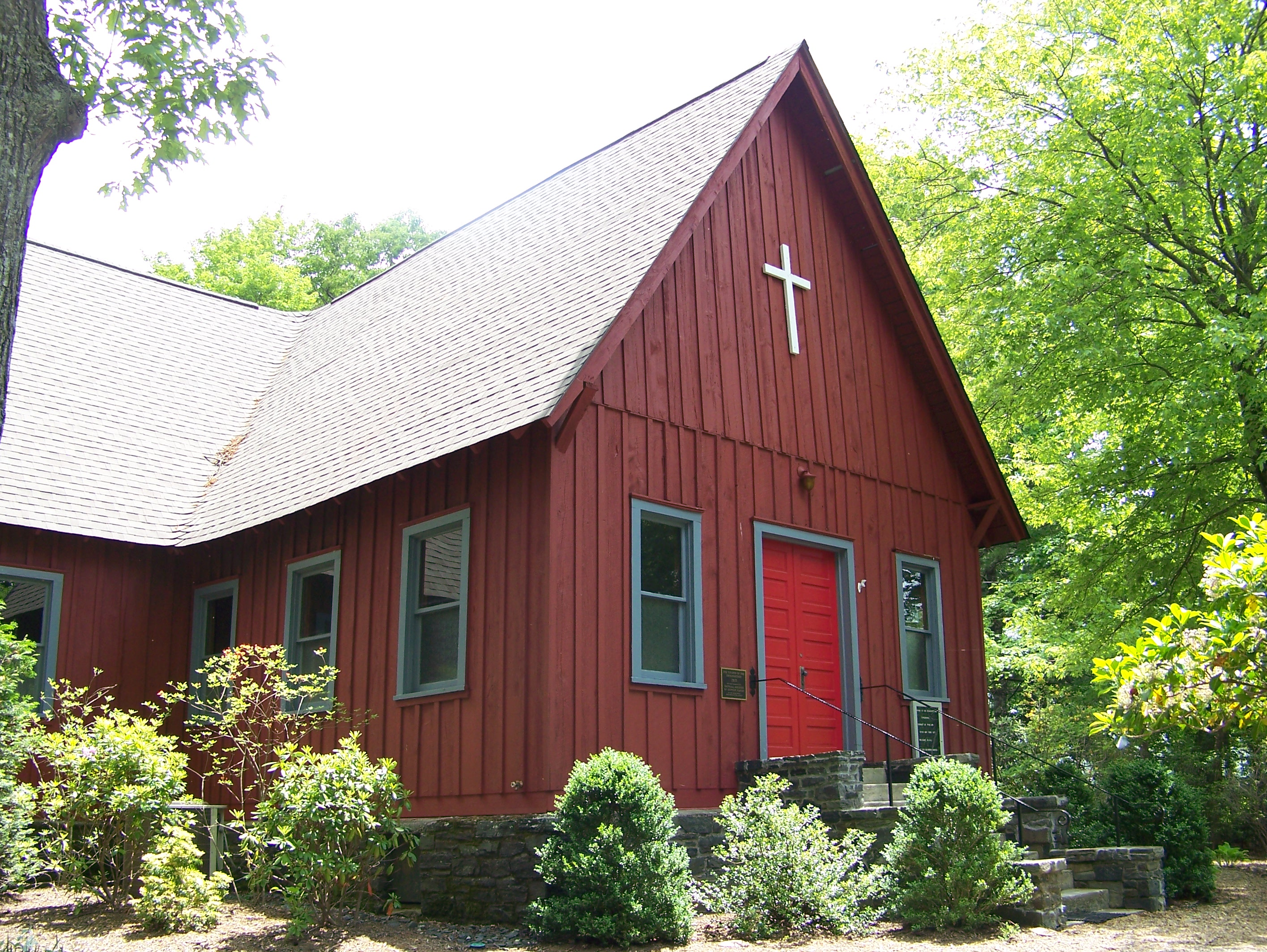

- Location within North Carolina Location within the United States
- Location: 160 High Ridge Rd., Little Switzerland, North Carolina
- Coordinates: 35°51′3″N 82°5′26″W
- Area: 0 acres (0 ha)
- Built: 1912
- Architect: Osborne, Adlai
- Architectural style: Cruciform plan
- NRHP reference No.: 99000272
- Added to NRHP: March 05, 1999

Church of the Resurrection is a historic Episcopal church located at 160 High Ridge Road in Little Switzerland, Mitchell County, North Carolina. The church was built in 1912 as a memorial to Fr. DuBose, an Episcopal priest. In the 1930s the church was moved from its original location 100 yards uphill, closer to the Blue Ridge Parkway. The church is not open year-round, but only from May through October with a summer vicar in residence.

It was added to the National Register of Historic Places in 1999.
