= Table Rock (North Carolina) =

Mountain in North Carolina, United States

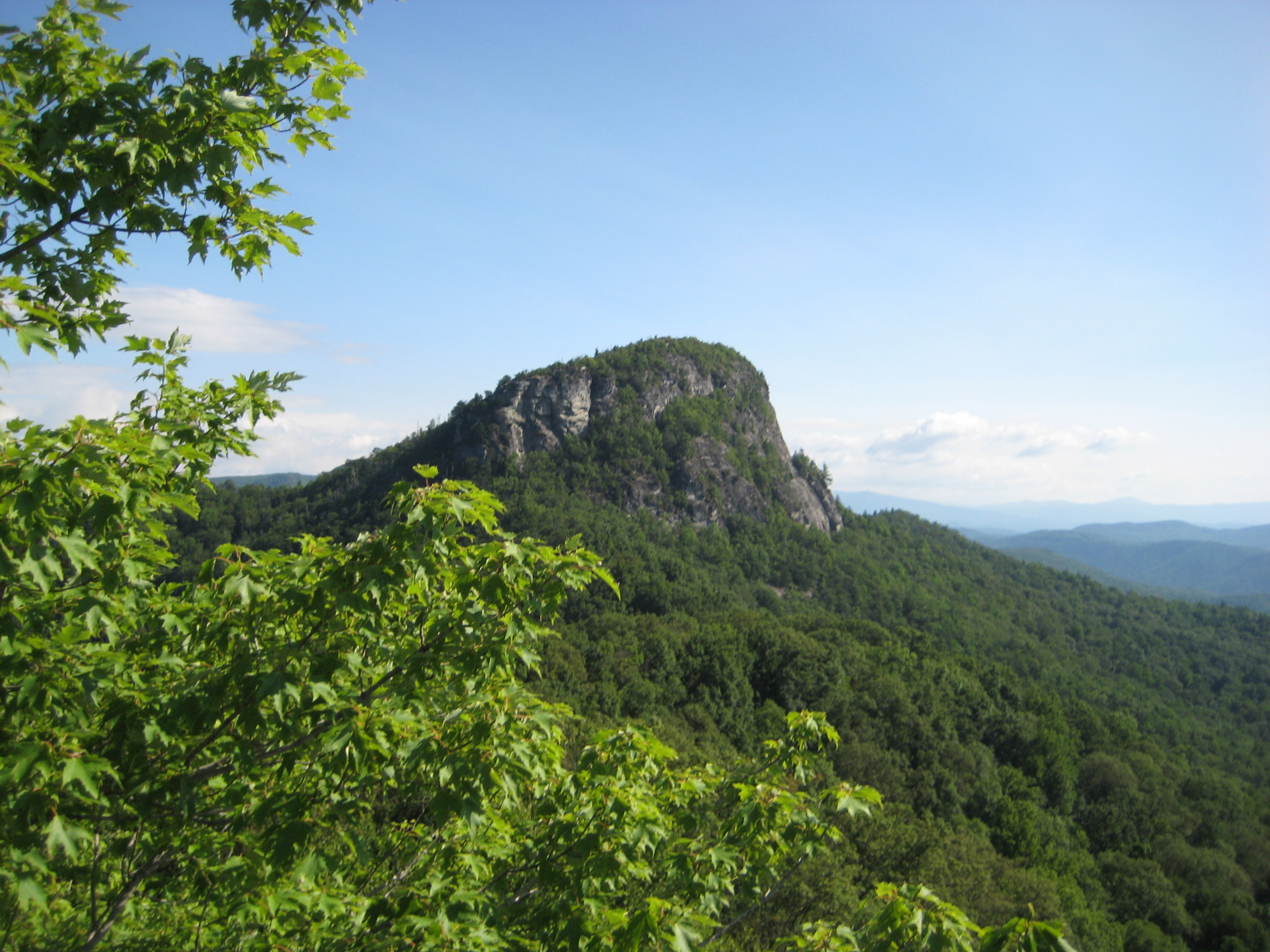
- A view of Table Rock from the Chimneys

Highest point
- Elevation: 3,940 ft (1,200 m)
- Coordinates: 35°53′10″N 81°53′04″W

Geography
- Location within North Carolina
- Location: Burke County, North Carolina, U.S.
- Parent range: Blue Ridge Mountains
- Topo map: USGS Linville Falls Quad

Climbing
- Easiest route: Hike

Table Rock is a mountain in the east rim of Linville Gorge, part of Pisgah National Forest (Grandfather Ranger District) in North Carolina. It features a distinctive rock formation, and is a prominent peak in the area.

The peak makes for a quick hike from a nearby parking area, and is also very popular for rock climbing. It is described as having a "national reputation of being the best place to climb in the Southeastern U.S.", and the "hub of climbing activity in Linville Gorge".

Table Rock is also known for its flora. Botanists André Michaux and John Fraser found various plants in the area in the nineteenth century. Fraser discovered Fraser's Sedge near the mountain.

Table Rock has been described as "the most visible symbol in the region". Former North Carolina senator Sam Ervin said that he retired to the nearby town of Morganton to "watch the glorious sunsets over Table Rock". In addition, Jules Verne's 1904 novel Master of the World describes Table Rock, which is called Great Eyrie in the book, as "rising high above the valley to sometimes belch strange sounds and fire over the little village of Morganton".

A wildfire swept through the area in November 2013. At least one hundred firefighters were involved.
