= Linville Gorge Wilderness =

Protected area in North Carolina, United States

Coordinates: 35.906238°N 81.914277°W

- IUCN category Ib (wilderness area)
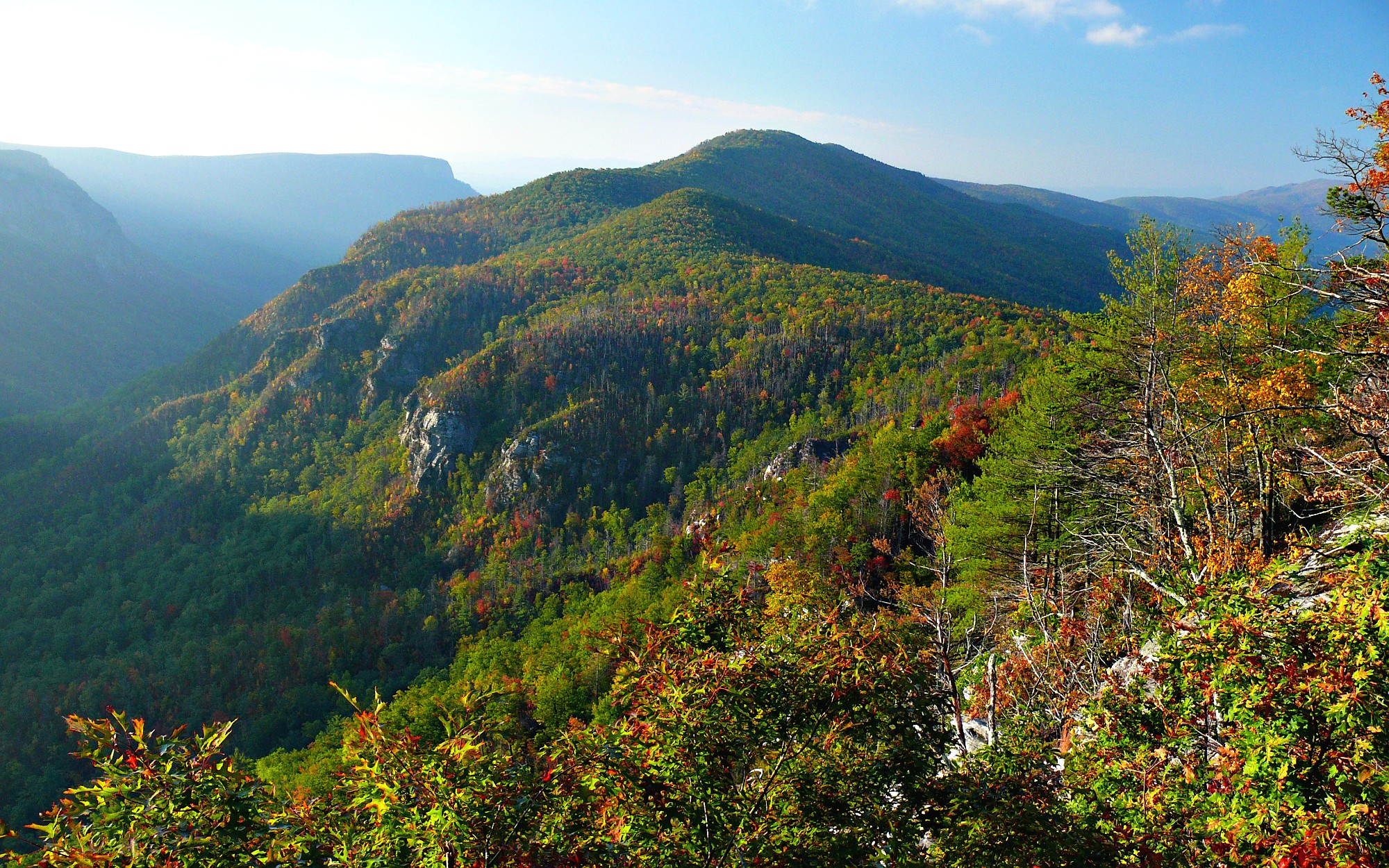
- Dogback Ridge as seen from Wiseman's View
- Location: Burke County, North Carolina, USA
- Nearest city: Morganton, North Carolina
- Area: 11,786 acres (48 km^{2})
- Designation: 1964
- Designated: Wilderness Area
- Governing body: United States Forest Service
- Website: Linville Gorge Wilderness

The Linville Gorge Wilderness ("The Grand Canyon of North Carolina") is the third largest wilderness area in North Carolina (after Shining Rock Wilderness and Joyce Kilmer-Slickrock Wilderness) and one of only two wilderness gorges in the Southern United States (along with Bald River Gorge Wilderness in Tennessee). Maintained by the United States Forest Service, it comprises 11,786 acres (47.70 km^{2}) around the Linville River, and is situated inside the Pisgah National Forest. The river is approximately 1,400 feet (430 m) below the ridge, thus hiking in and out of the Gorge is challenging and enjoyable for those who like serious hiking. The plant and animal community is extremely diverse, with a dense hardwood/pine forest and a wide variety of smaller trees and other plants as well as bear, fox, raccoon, trout, grouse, wild turkey, vultures, owls, hawks, copperheads, and timber rattlesnakes.

Popular tourist attractions in or near the wilderness are:

- Linville Falls, a waterfall fed by the river and free to the public.
- Wiseman's View, a rock outcrop near the center of the gorge that gives an excellent view of the interior of the gorge.
- Linville Caverns, a privately maintained cave attraction accessible by automobile from U.S. Route 221.

== History ==
Prior to the European colonization of North America, virtually all of western North Carolina was inhabited by tribes of the Cherokee Indians. In the Cherokee language, the Linville River is called Ee-see-oh, which means "river of many cliffs" when literally translated. Early white settlers named the river Linville in honor of John and William Linville, explorers who were scalped by the Shawnee in the gorge in 1766.

The steepness of the sides, the depth of the gorge, and the peaks of the Jonas Ridge to the east and Linville Mountain to the west made settlement impractical in the 1800s and 1900s. In the early 20th century, logging was a major industry in the surrounding region, but the gorge itself was spared clearcutting. The forbidding nature of the terrain made resource extraction unprofitable, which is the primary reason why the gorge is one of the few remaining examples of old growth forest in the Blue Ridge Mountains range. No industrial logging ever took place within the gorge, and its virgin forests span 10,000 acres (40 km^{2}). The gorge is remarkably free of manmade structures, and of the four major gorges in North Carolina, the Linville Gorge is the only one without a road in the bottom.

Formal protection of the area began in 1952, when the land was purchased with funds donated by John D. Rockefeller. When the Wilderness Act was approved by Congress and signed into law by President Johnson in 1964, the Linville Gorge Wilderness became one of the first formally designated Wilderness areas of the new National Wilderness Preservation System. It is the only gorge or canyon in the United States that was labeled a wilderness area in the initial year of the Wilderness Act that has never changed in acreage. It is managed by the Grandfather Ranger District of the United States Forest Service.

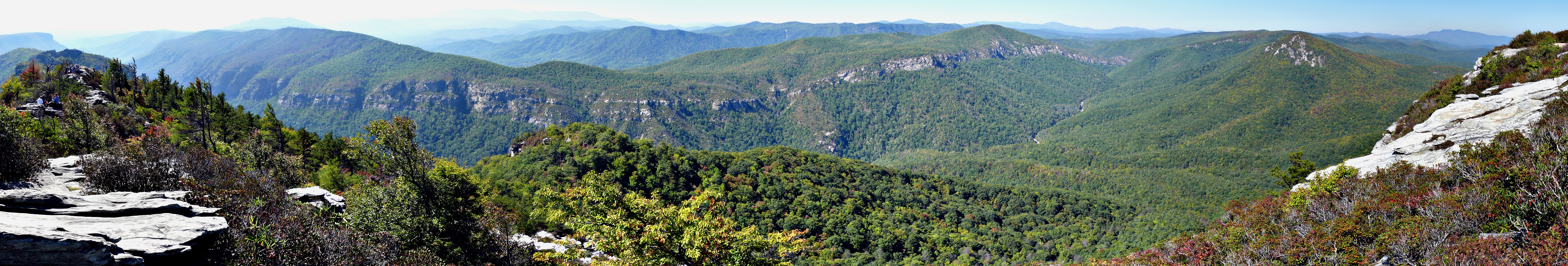
The southern end of Linville Gorge, as seen from the summit of Table Rock

== Camping and hiking ==
Due to the nature of the terrain, hiking in the Linville Gorge can be a strenuous and challenging activity. Maps of the trail system are available through United States Forest Service offices and information facilities in the area, but it's important to remember that due to the Wilderness area designation, trails in the gorge are not the improved, well-marked, cleared and graded paths that visitors to state or national parks become accustomed to.

In order to maintain the quality of the wilderness, camping in the gorge is managed by the Grandfather Ranger District of the United States Forest Service. Group sizes are limited to no more than ten people, and free permits are required on weekends and holidays from 1 May until 31 October each year. Permits are restricted to one stay per group per month, and for no longer than three days and two nights per visit.

== Hunting and fishing ==
Game animals such as deer, black bear, wild turkey, and gray squirrel are common in the gorge. As part of the Pisgah Game Lands established by the North Carolina Wildlife Resources Commission, hunting is legal in the area in keeping with local seasons and hunting regulations. In actual practice, hunting in the Linville Gorge is fairly rare, due to the difficult, inaccessible terrain and the presence of campers and hikers who are often unfamiliar with hunting seasons.

The Linville River is included in the NC Wildlife trout stocking program, and fishermen are occasionally seen in the gorge seeking brown, brook, and rainbow trout. Once again however, the terrain requires a long hike down the steep sides of the gorge to reach the river, and a long difficult hike back, so fishing is more common on the river above and below the gorge section.

== Climbing ==
Rock climbing is allowed anywhere in the area, but due to nesting peregrine falcons, certain areas are sometimes closed. Popular spots include Table Rock, The Amphitheater, The North Carolina Wall, Shortoff Mountain, The Chimneys, and Hawksbill Mountain. For adventurous climbers the Gold Coast Cliffs are a relatively unclimbed section of the gorge lying across from the other areas.

== Photo gallery ==
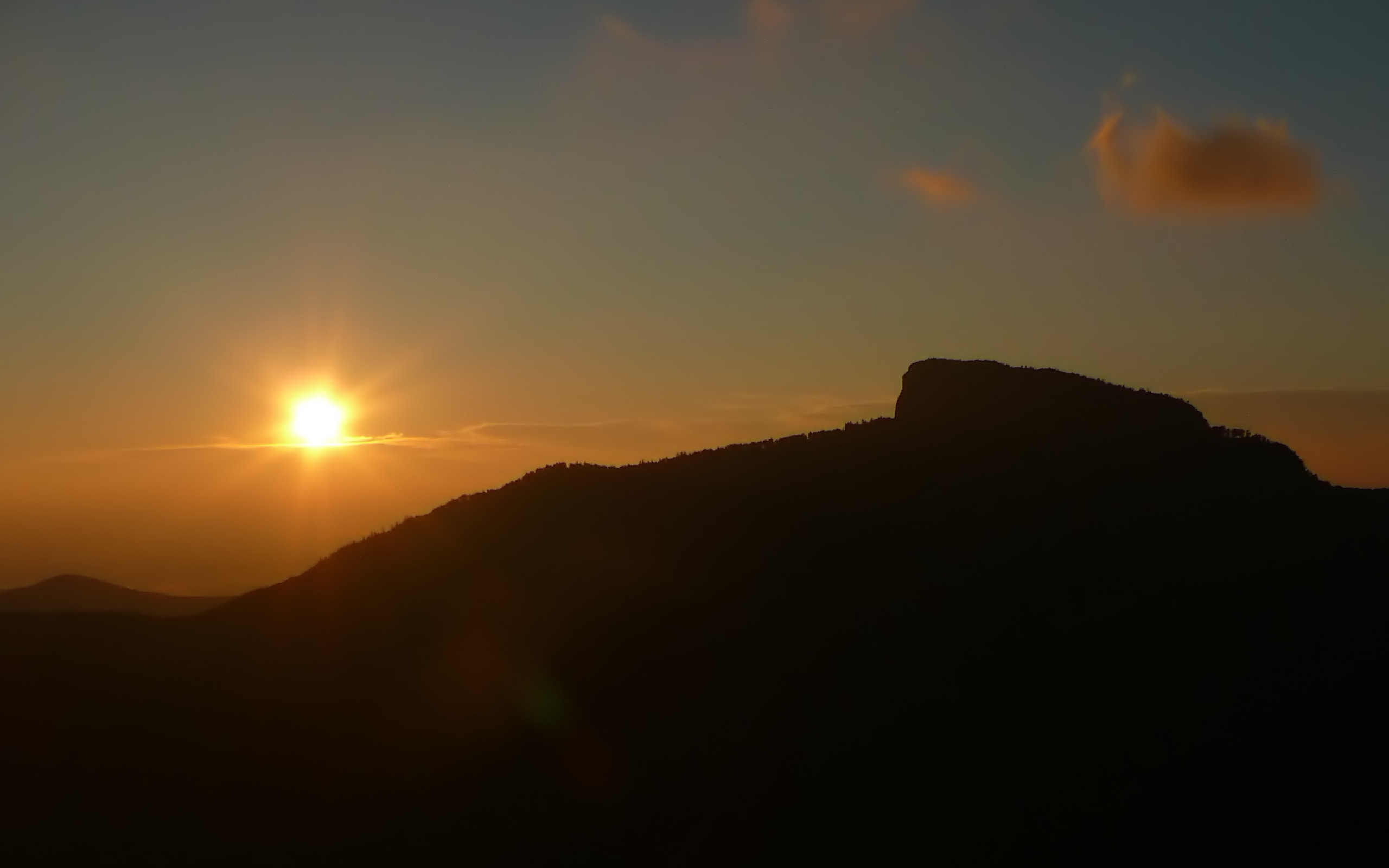
Sunrise over Table Rock

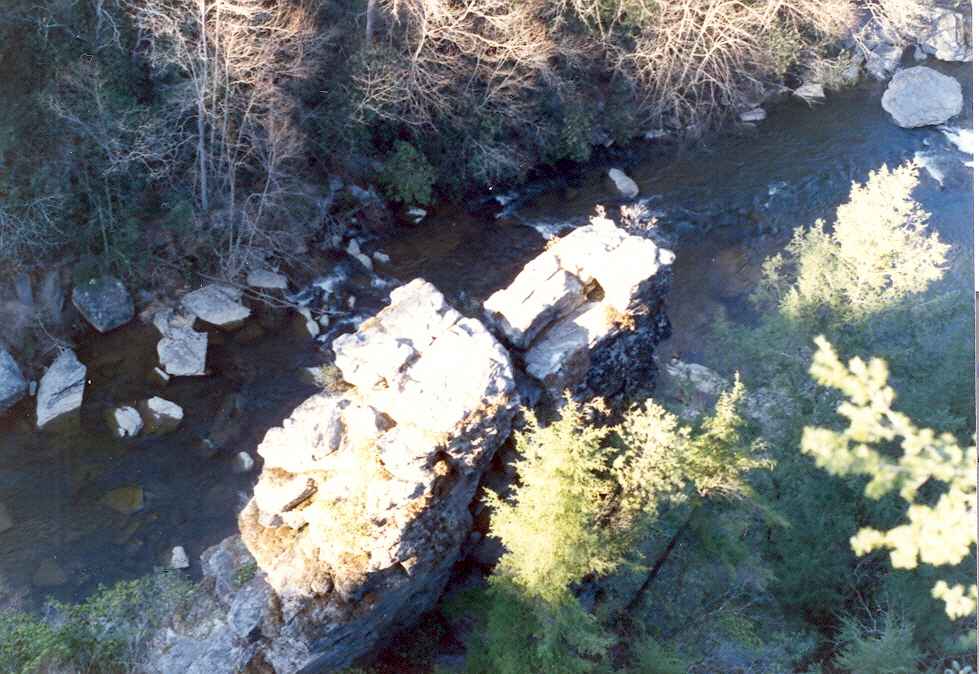
Babel Tower

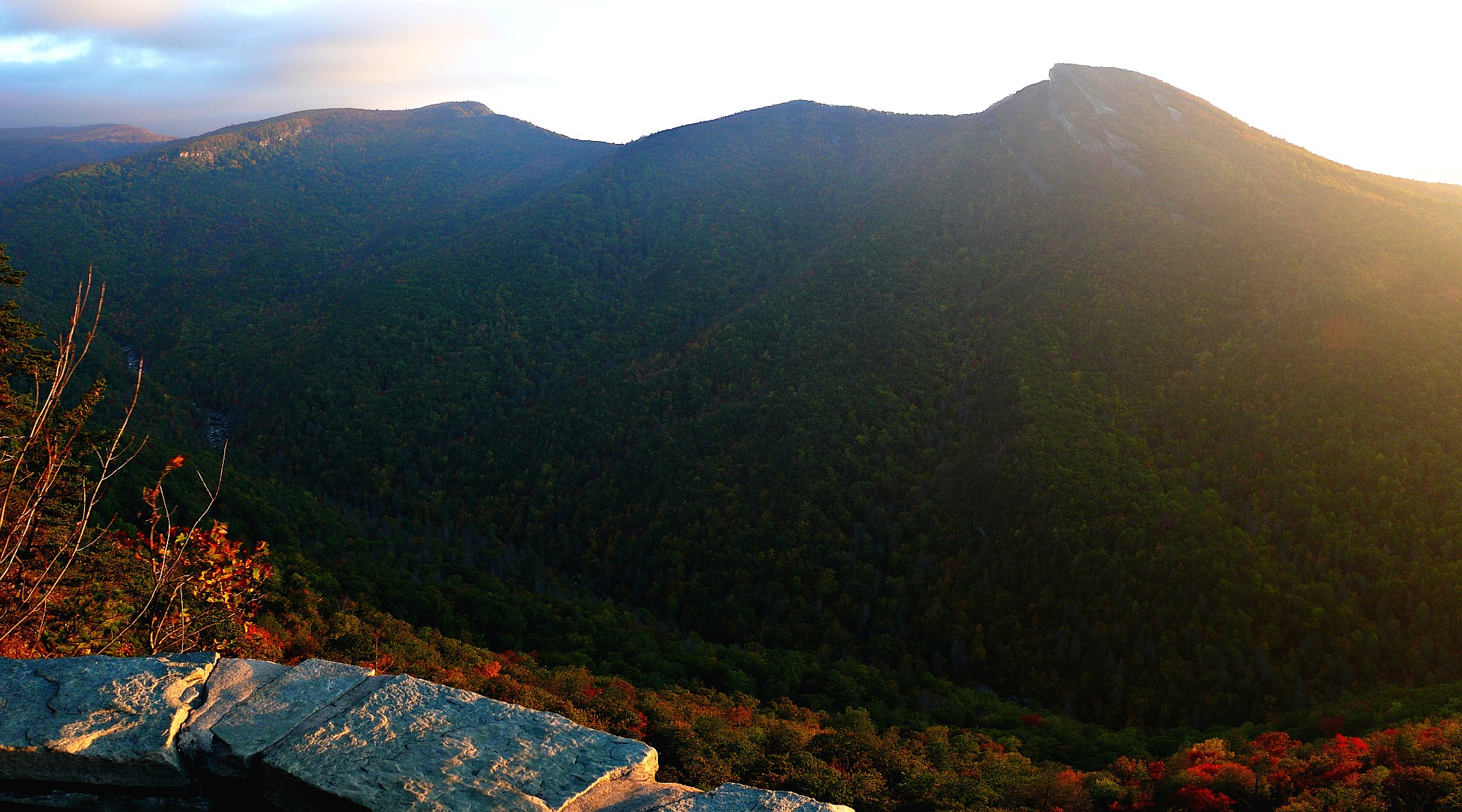
Hawksbill and Sitting Bear as seen from Wiseman's View

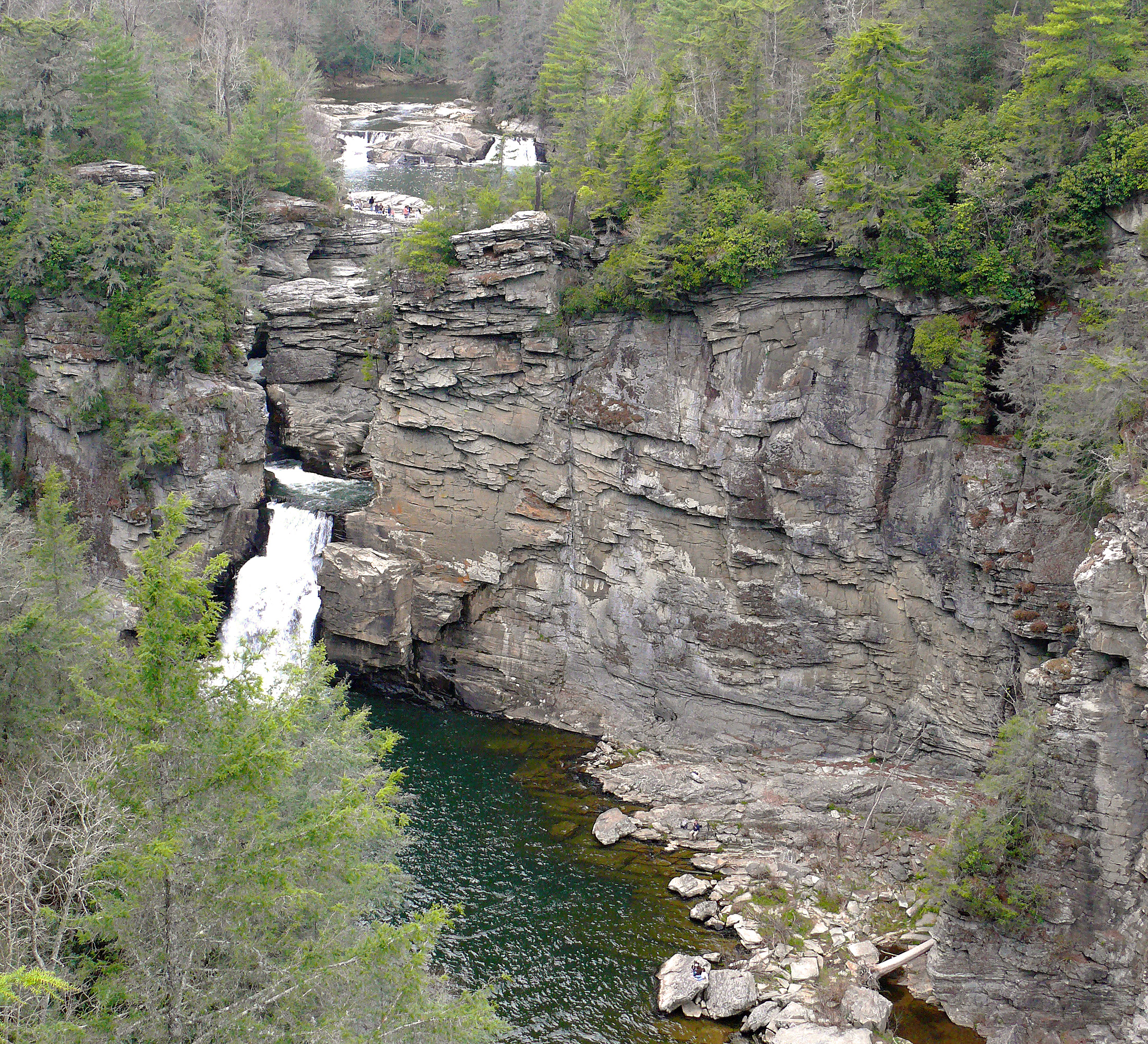
Linville Falls at the northern end of Linville Gorge

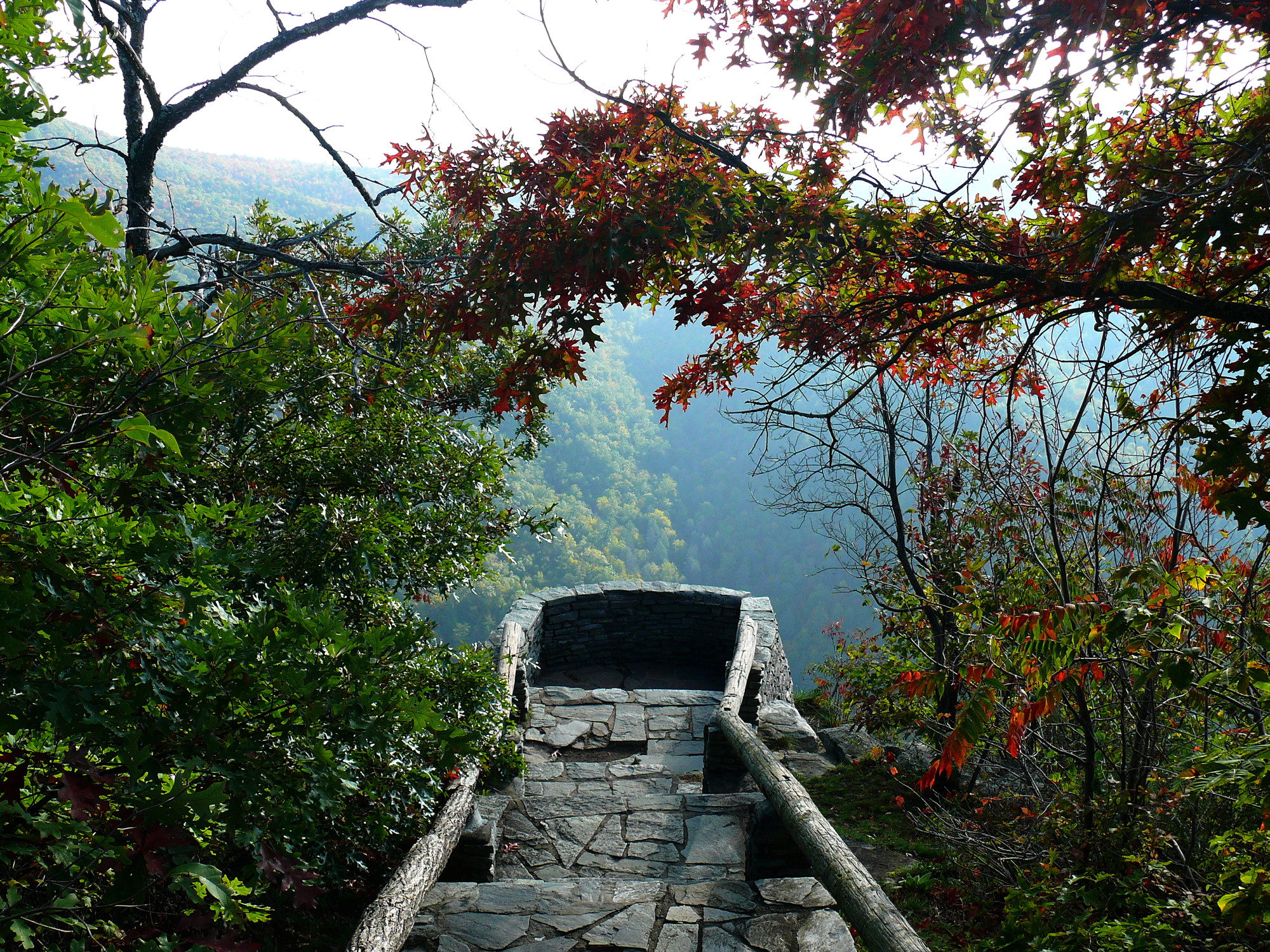
Wiseman's View

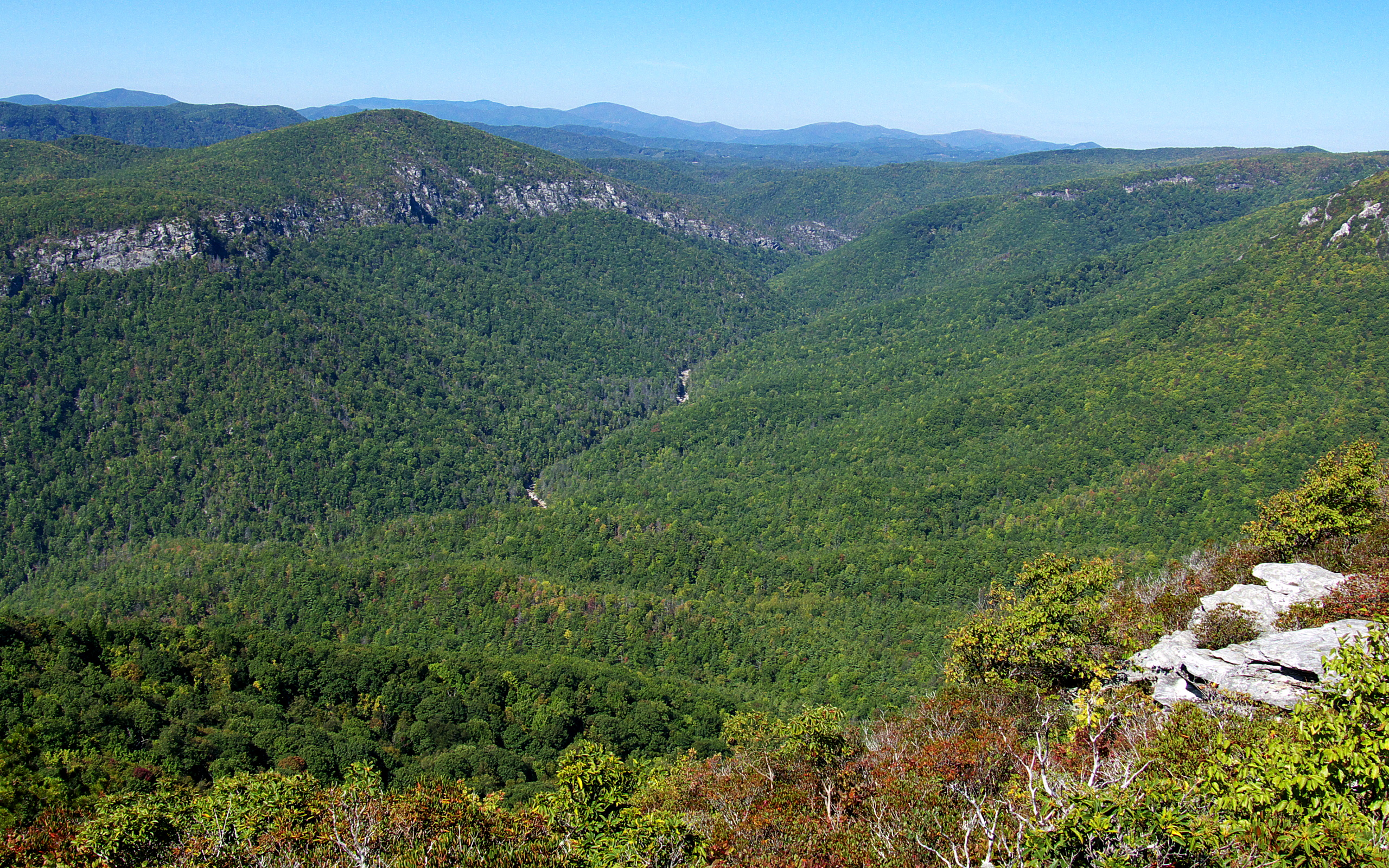
The Linville Gorge as seen from the top of Table Rock

Climbers in the Linville Gorge

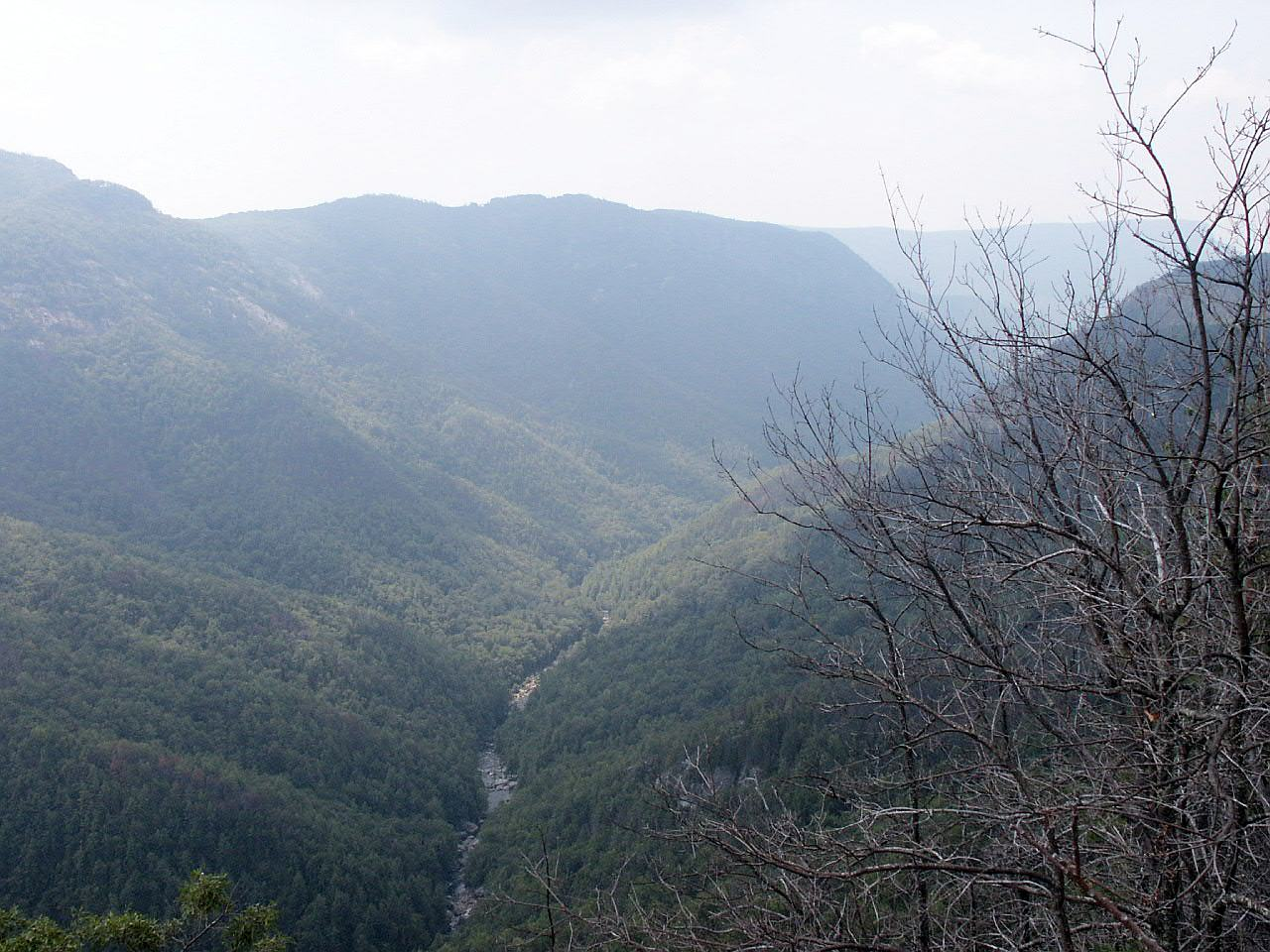
Linville Gorge from Wiseman's View

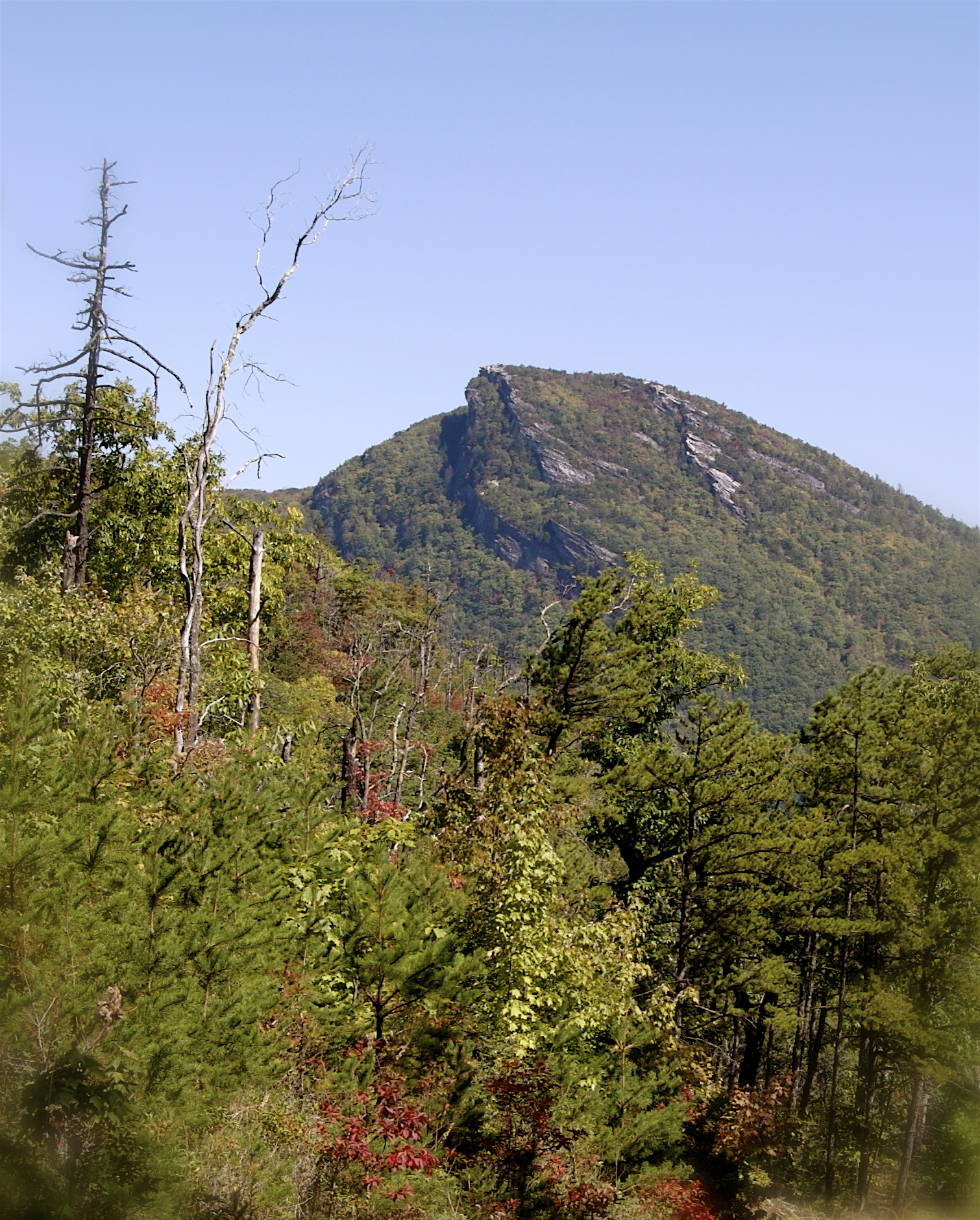
Hawksbill Mountain as seen from Dogback Ridge

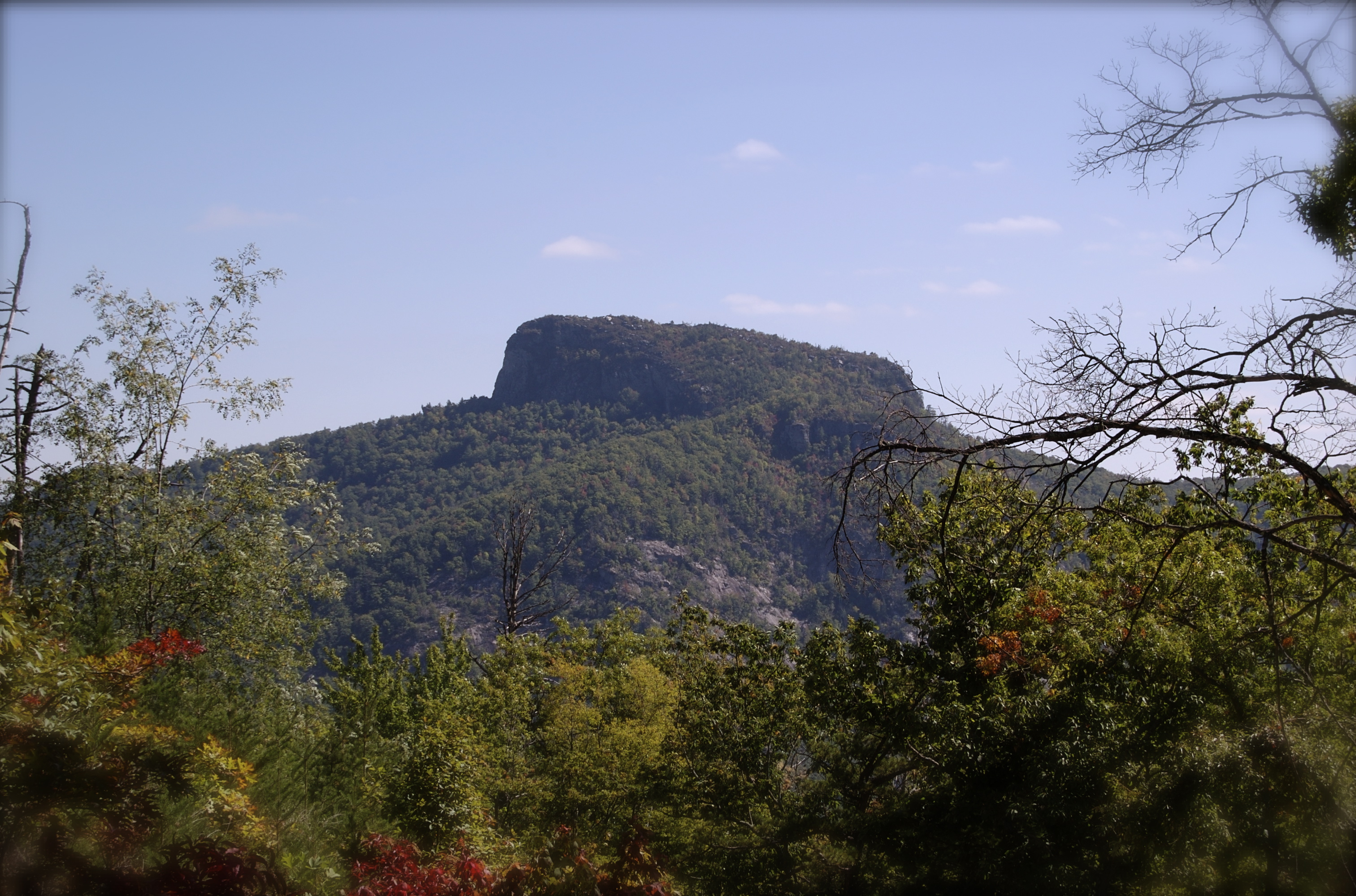
Table Rock as seen from Dogback Ridge

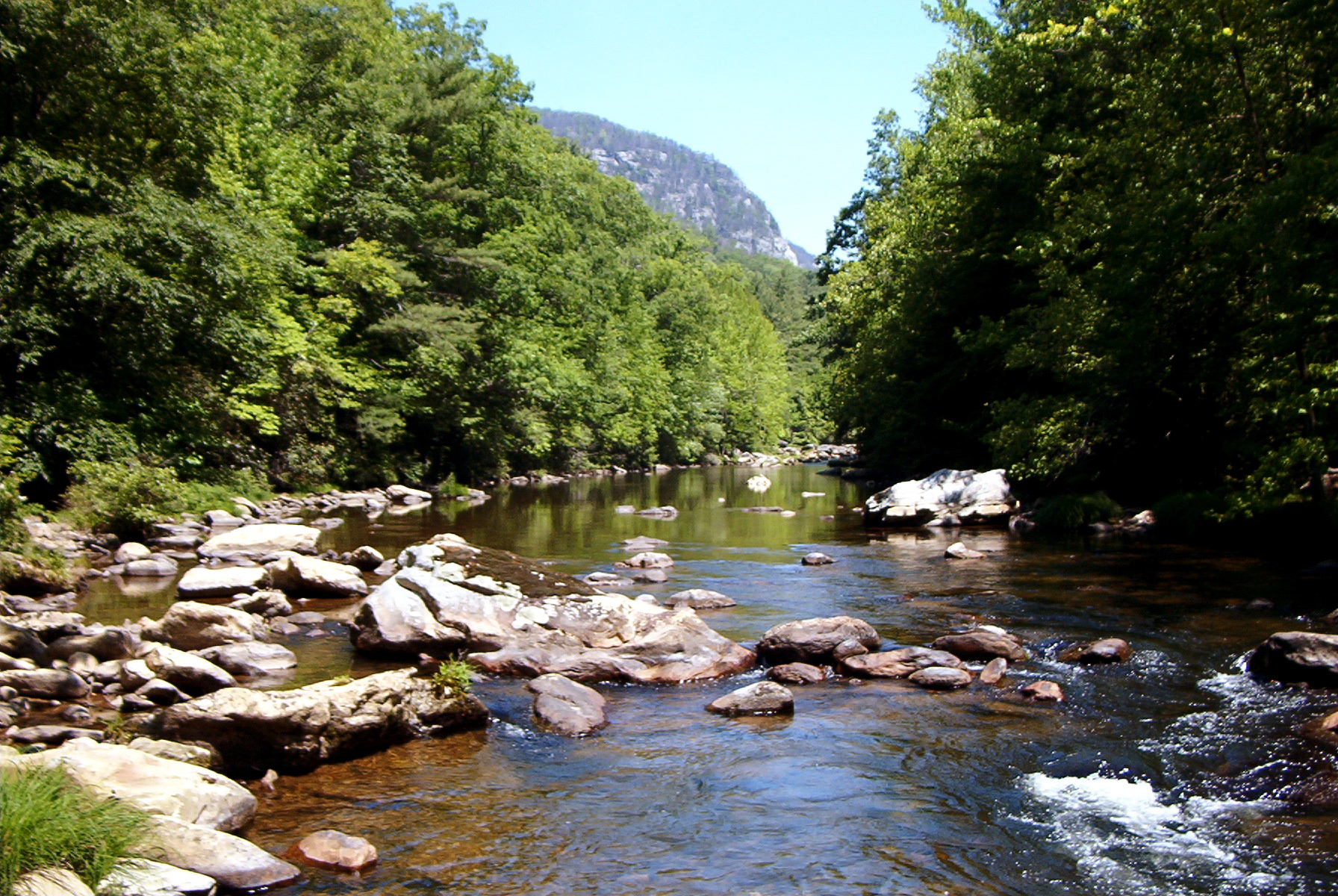
View of the Linville River

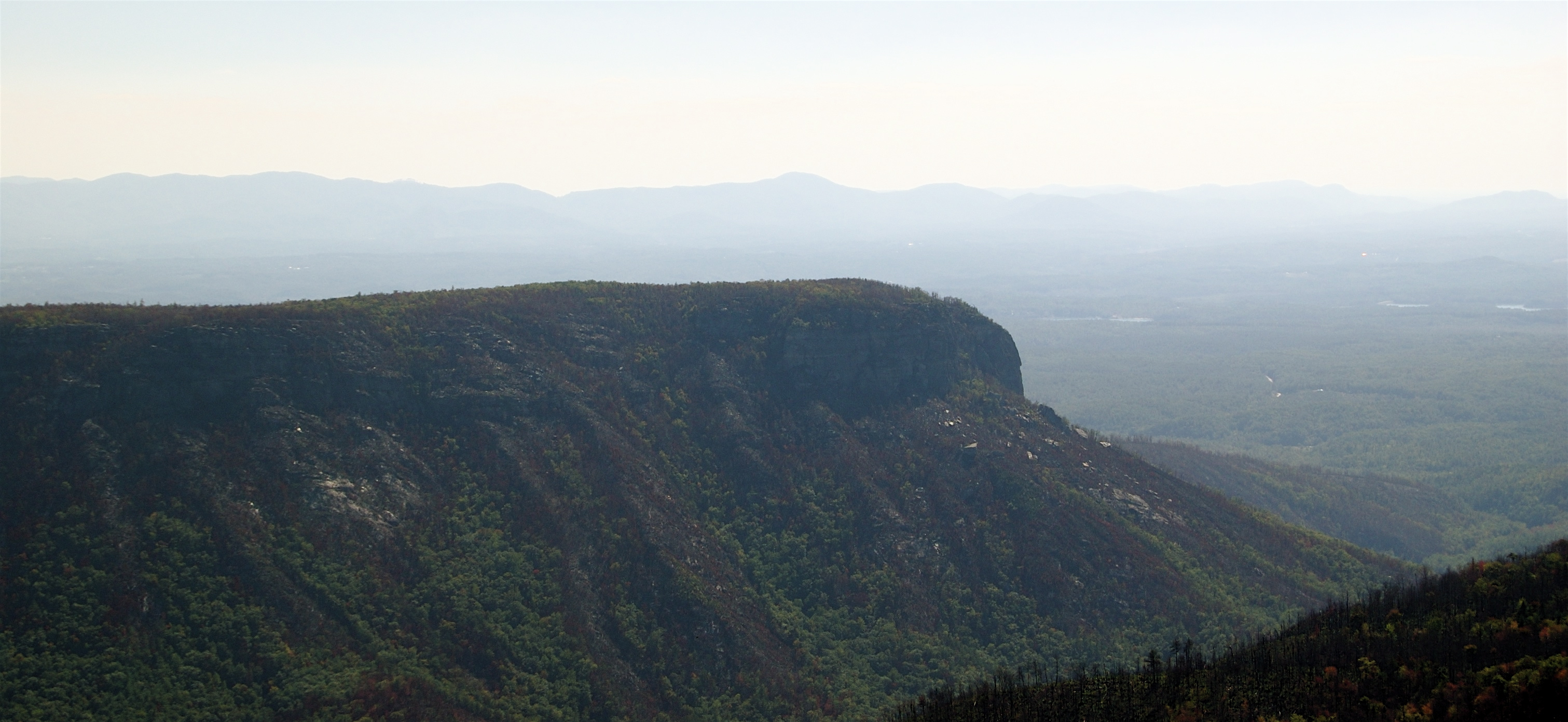
Southeast Canyon Wall

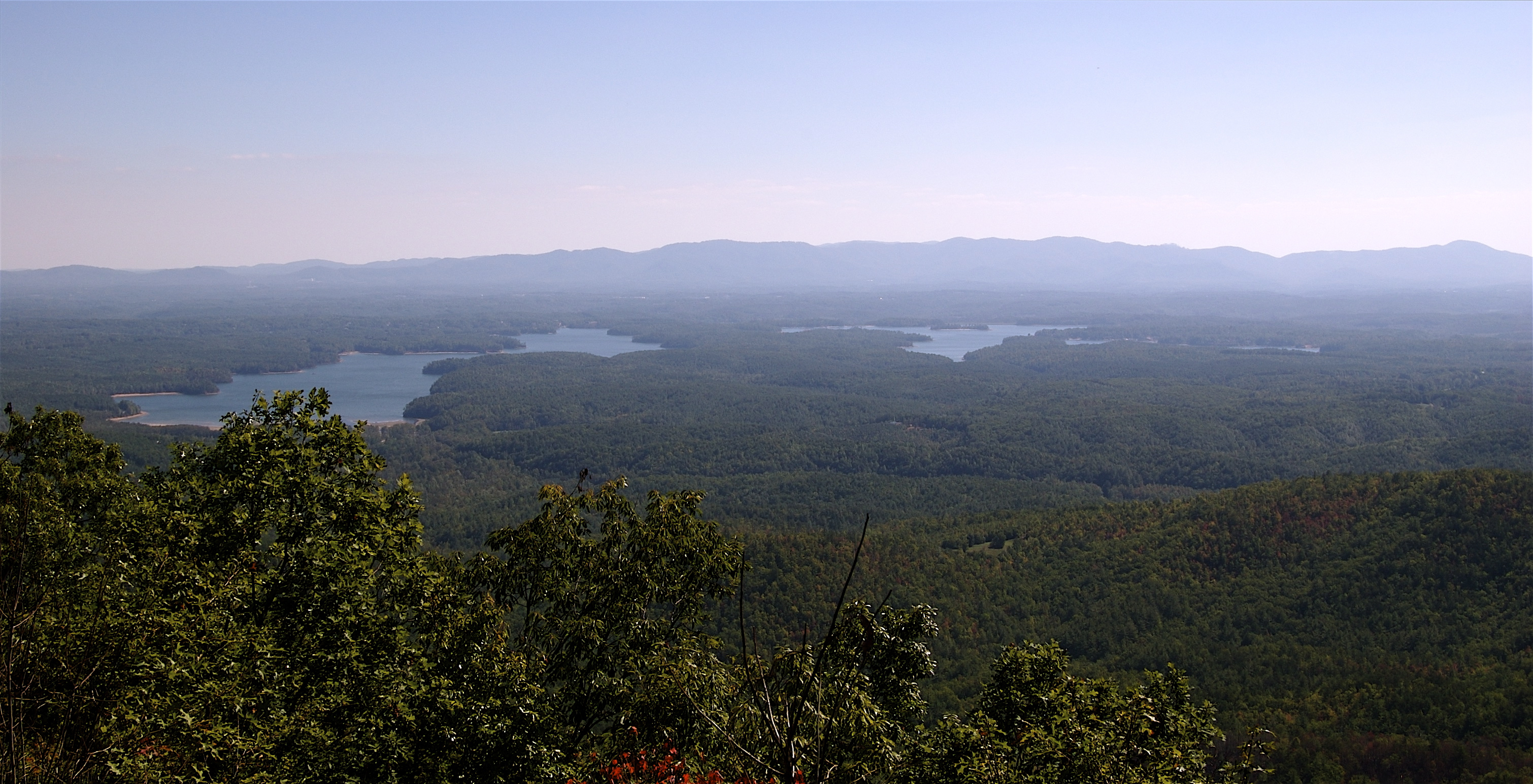
Lake James and surrounding area from southern end of Linville Gorge

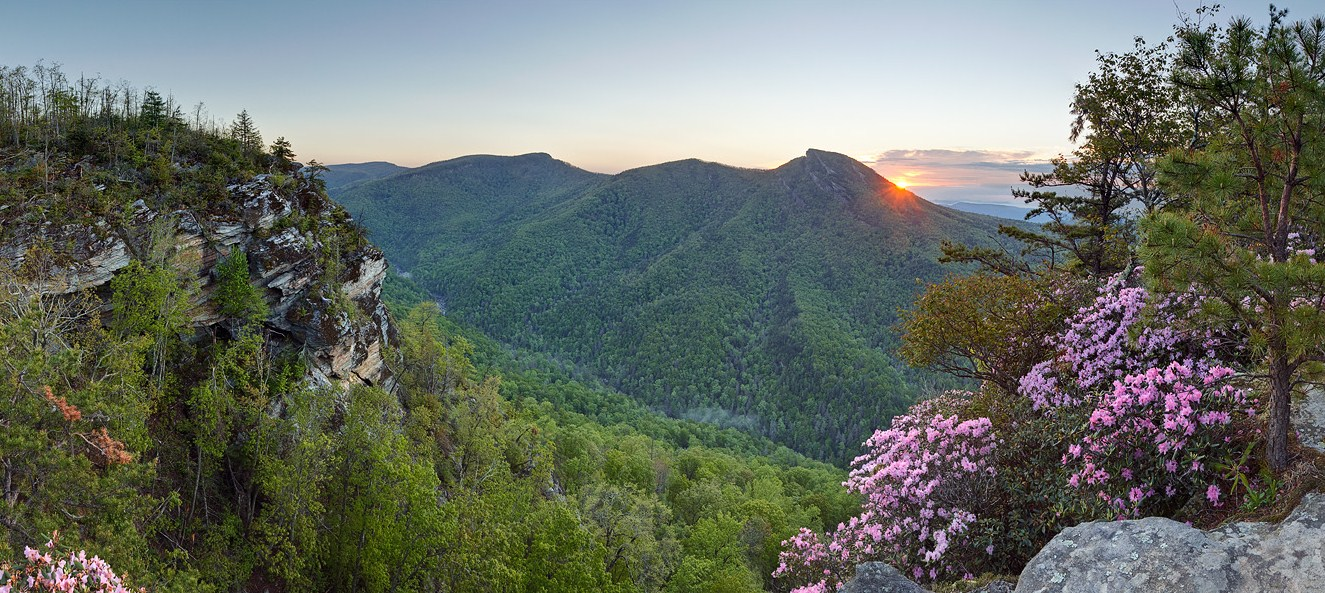
Sunrise from Wiseman's View

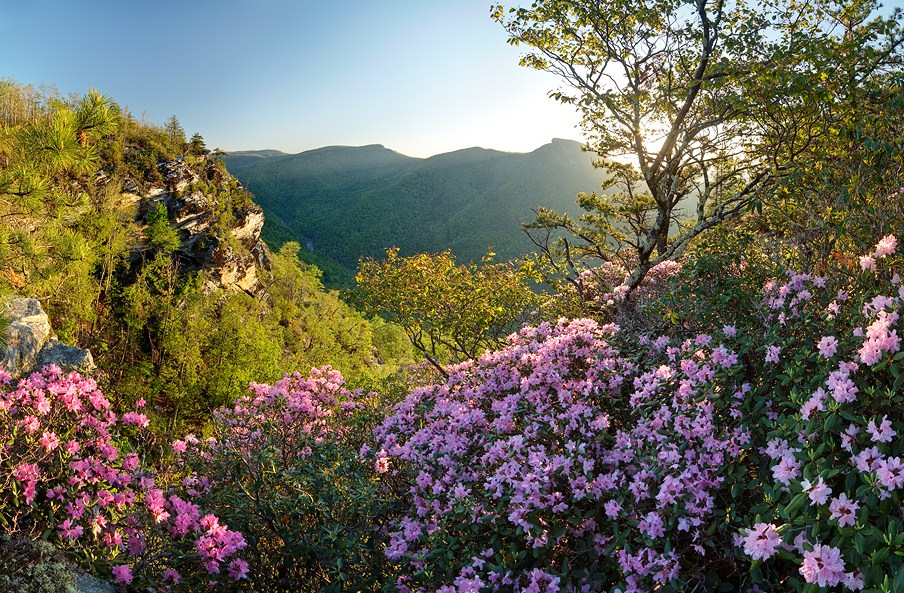
Springtime at Wiseman's View

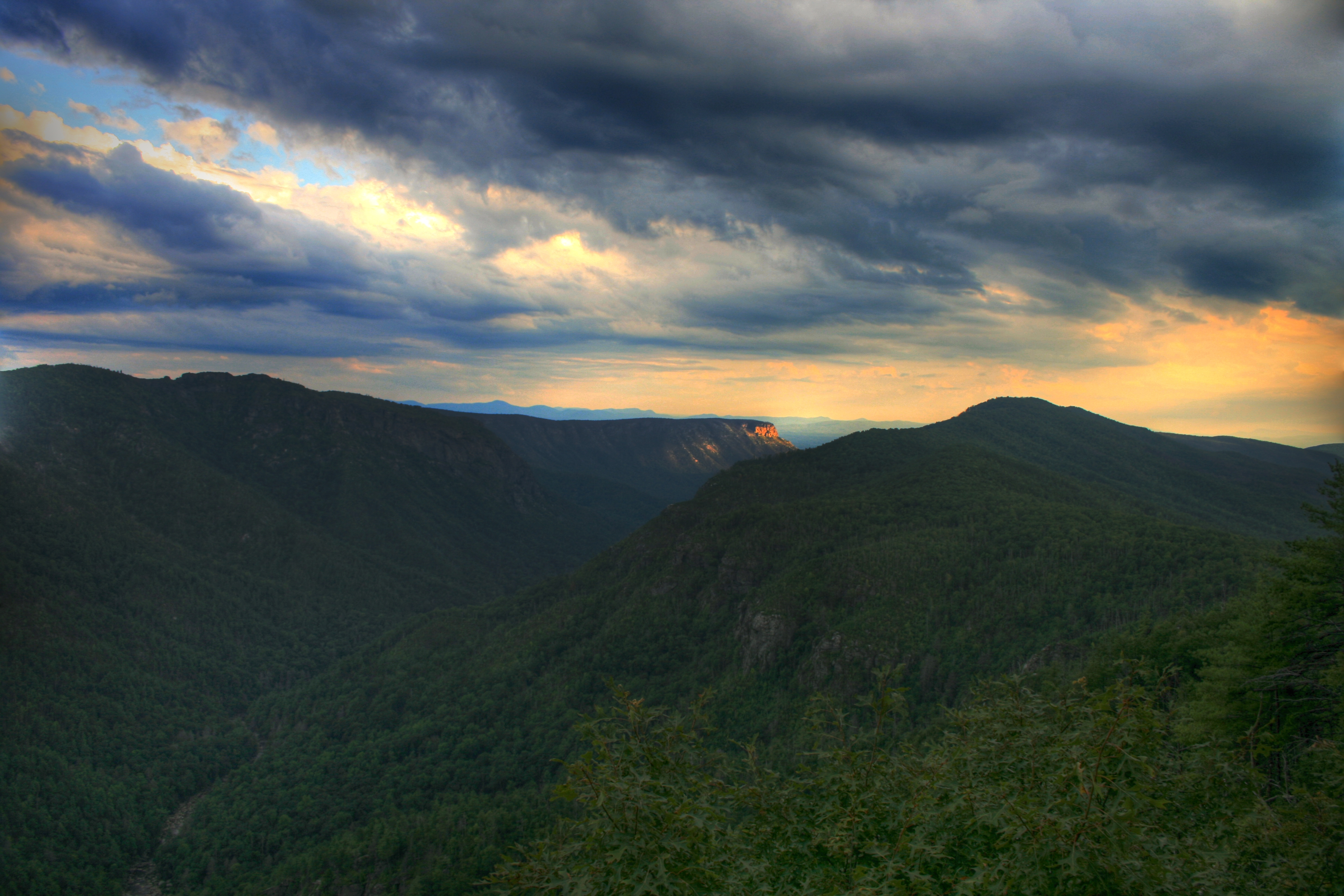
Sunset from Wiseman's View

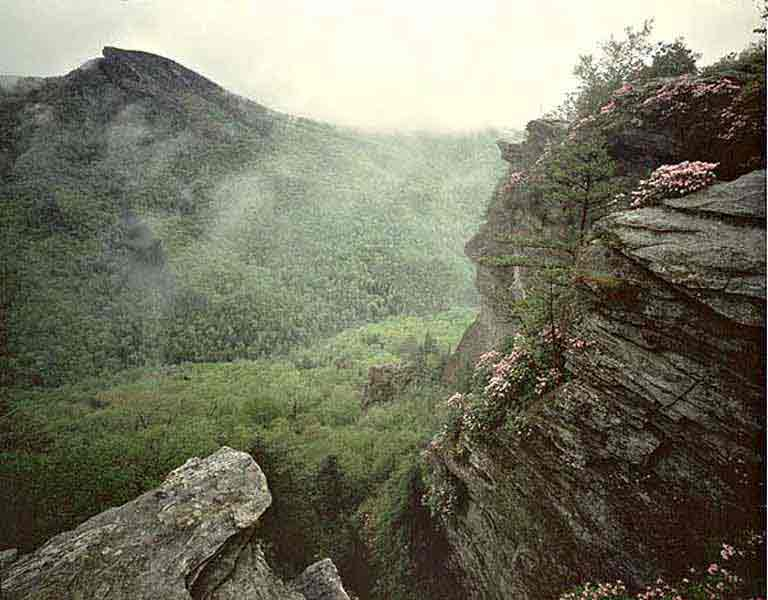
Gorge and Hawksbill from Wiseman's View

== See also ==
- Blue Ridge Parkway
