= Chain lightning =

Chain lightning may refer to:

- Angular, zigzag, forked, or bead lightning
- Lockheed XP-58 Chain Lightning, an American World War II fighter airplane that never went into mass production
- Chain Lightning (1922 film), a silent melodrama
- Chain Lightning (1927 film), an American Western
- Chain Lightning (1950 film), an aviation film starring Humphrey Bogart
- Chain Lightning (album), by Don McLean
- "Chain Lightning", a Steely Dan song from the album Katy Lied
- "Chain Lightnin'", .38 Special's song from Special Forces
- "Chain Lightning", a song from Rush's Presto
- "Chain Lightning", a song from Bruce Springsteen's 2015 box set The Ties That Bind: The River Collection
- Chain Lightning (comics), an enemy of DC Comics' Captain Marvel
