= Pine of Naples =

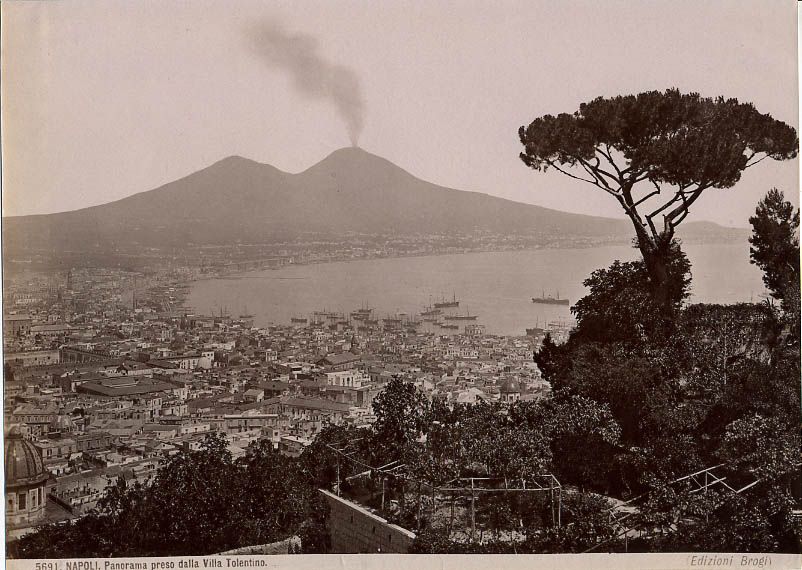
Photo of the Pine of Naples by Giacomo Brogi (1822-1881).

The Pine of Naples was a Pinus pinea (stone pine), which until the 1980s featured prominently in most postcards that had a panoramic view of the city of Naples and its gulf, with Mount Vesuvius as the background. The tree was located on Via Minucio Felice, near the church of Sant'Antonio in Posillipo. It is believed to have been planted after 1855.

By 1984 the tree had fallen ill and was removed. After the removal of the original specimen, a new Pine of Naples was planted in 1995 by the environmental organization Legambiente, which still celebrates this event every year.
