= Dry thunderstorm =

Thunderstorm where little to no precipitation reaches the ground

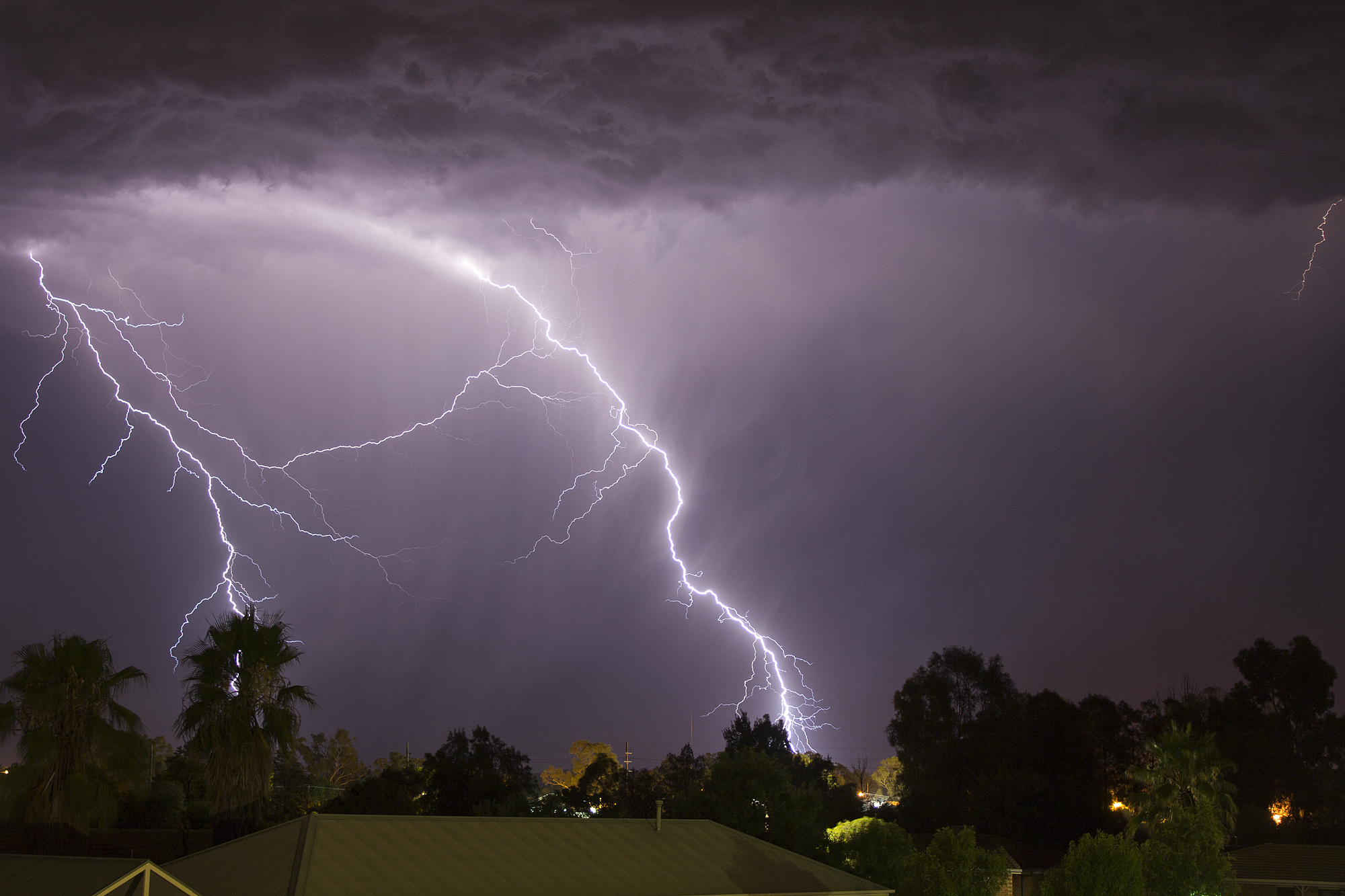
A cloud-to-ground lightning strike during a dry thunderstorm near Wagga Wagga, Australia

A dry thunderstorm is a thunderstorm that produces thunder and lightning, but where all or most of its precipitation evaporates before reaching the ground. Dry lightning is lightning occurring in this situation. Both are so common in the American West that the terms for them are sometimes used interchangeably.

Dry thunderstorms occur essentially in dry conditions, and their lightning is a major cause of wildfires. Because of that, the United States National Weather Service, and other agencies around the world, issue forecasts for its likelihood over large areas.

== Occurrence ==
Dry thunderstorms generally occur in deserts or places where the lower layers of the atmosphere usually contain little water vapor. Any precipitation that falls from elevated thunderstorms can be entirely evaporated as it falls through the lower dry layers. They are common during the summer months across much of western North America and other arid areas. The shaft of precipitation that can be seen falling from a cloud without reaching the ground is called "virga".

A thunderstorm does not have to be completely dry to be considered dry; in many areas 0.1 inches (2.5 mm) is the threshold between a "wet" and "dry" thunderstorm.

== Hazards ==
Dry thunderstorms are notable for two reasons: they are the most common natural origin of wildland fires, and they can produce strong gusty surface winds that can fan flames.

=== Dust storms ===
Strong winds often develop around dry thunderstorms as the evaporating precipitation causes significant cooling of the air beneath the storm, which increases its density and thereby its weight relative to the surrounding air. This cool air then descends rapidly and fans out upon impacting the ground, an event often described as a dry microburst. As the gusty winds expand outward from the storm, dry soil and sand are often picked up by the strong winds, creating dust and sand storms known as haboobs.

=== Fires ===
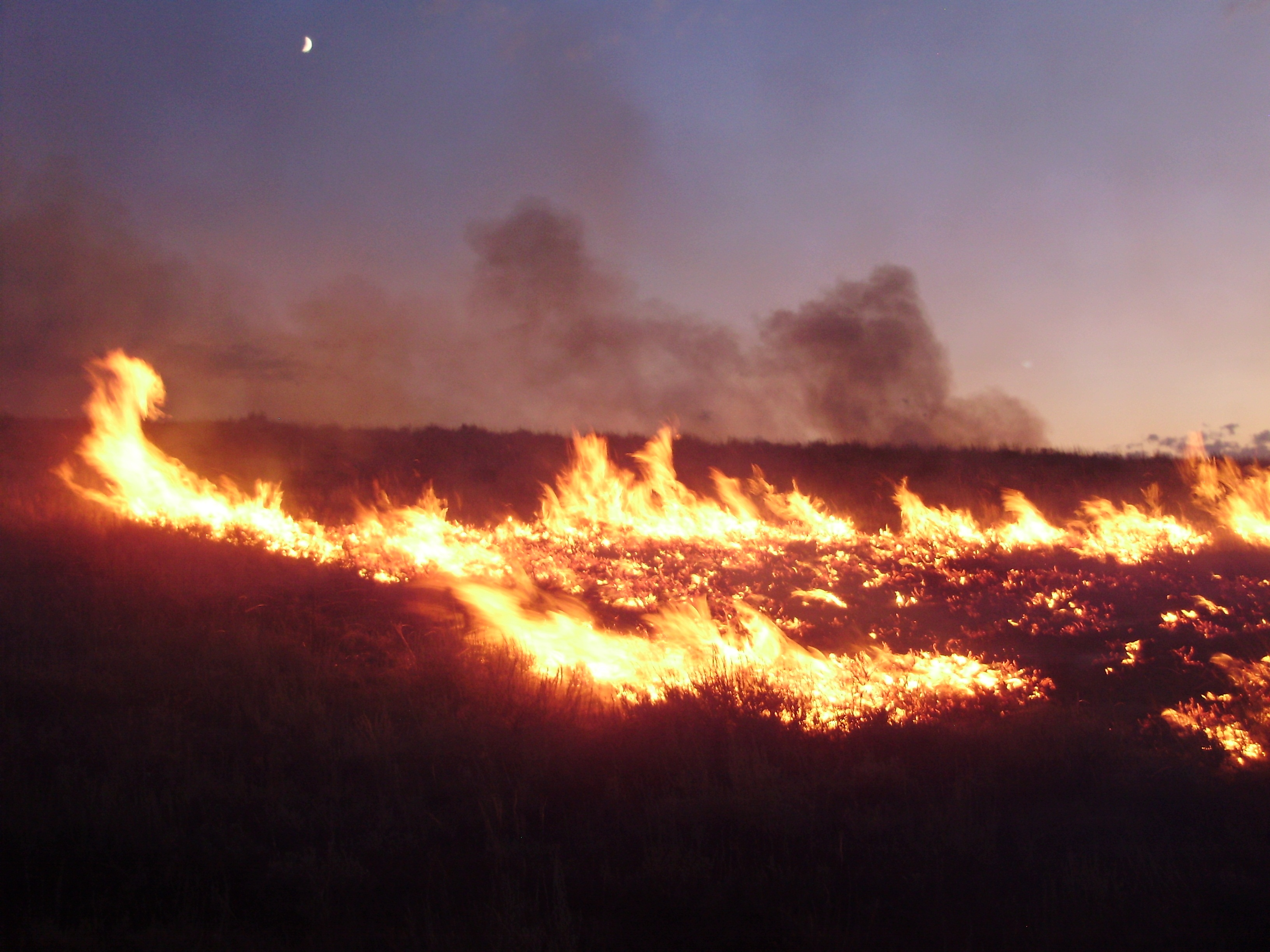
A lightning-sparked wildfire in Nevada.

During dry thunderstorms there is little to no rain that could prevent lightning from causing areas with trees or other vegetation to catch fire. Storm winds also fan the fire and firestorm, causing it to spread more quickly.

Pyrocumulonimbus are cumuliform clouds that can form over a large fire and that are particularly dry. When the higher levels of the atmosphere are cooler, and the surface is thus warmed to extreme temperatures due to a wildfire, volcano, or other event, convection will occur, and produce clouds and lightning. They are similar to any cumulus cloud but ingest extra particulates from the fire. This increases the voltage difference between the base and the top of the cloud, helping to produce lightning.

== Climate change ==
Climate change is expected to alter patterns of lightning-ignited wildfires. A key factor in the ignition of these wildfires is the type of lightning, with long-continuing-current (LCC) lightning being particularly significant. The risk of lightning-ignited wildfires is influenced not only by the occurrence of LCC lightning but also by the availability of dry fuel, which is influenced by how much rain has fallen before. Scientists predict, some places will see more LCC lightning and less rain, making it easier for wildfires to start. Areas like Southeastern Asia, South America, Africa, and Australia, along with parts of North America and Europe, could be at higher risk for these lightning-caused wildfires.

== See also ==
- Heat lightning
- Lightning strike
- List of lightning phenomena
