= Vesuvius in Eruption (Wright painting) =

Series of paintings by Joseph Wright of Derby

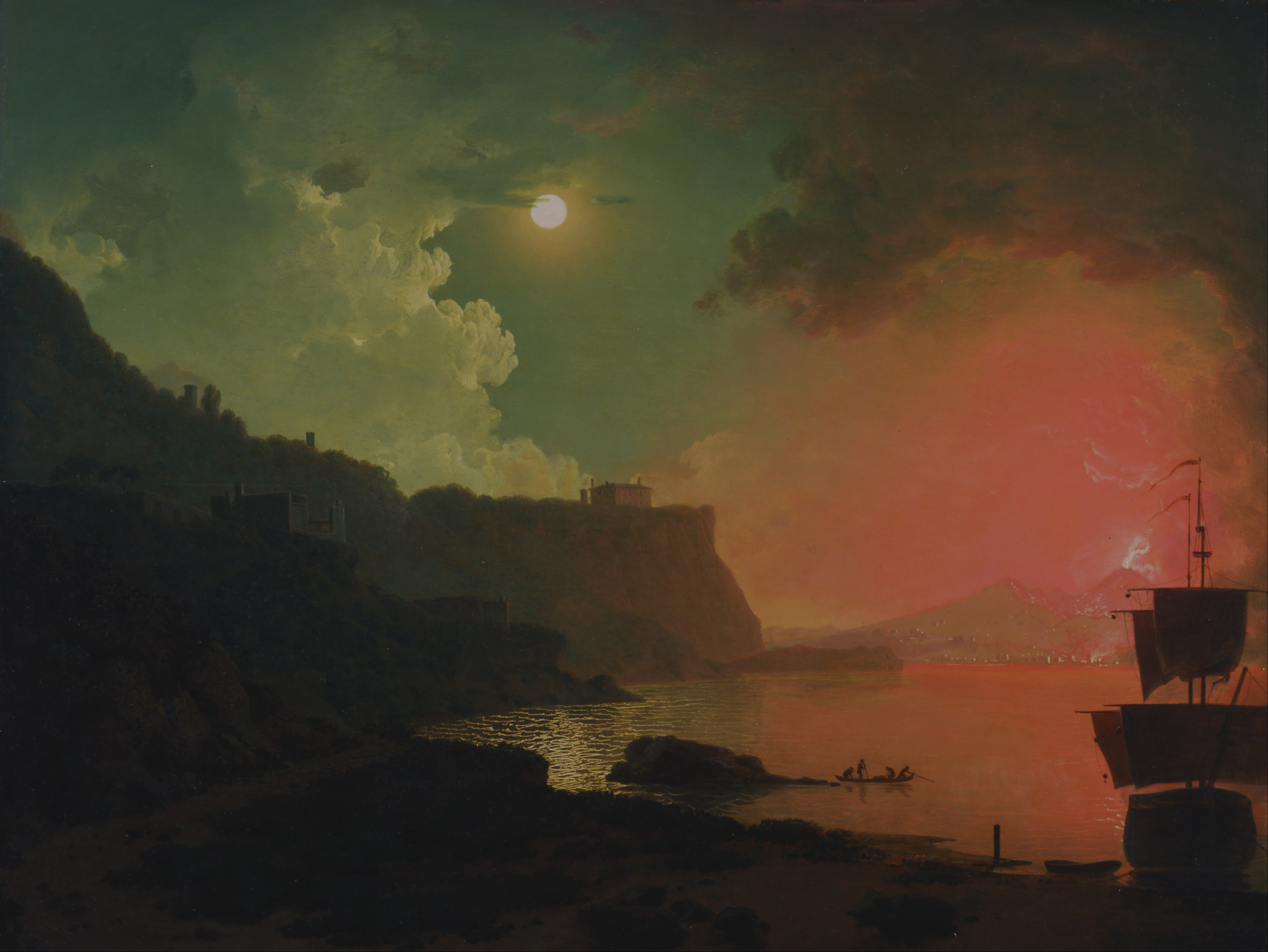
Vesuvius from Posillipo by Joseph Wright of Derby (Yale Center for British Art, New Haven, Connecticut)

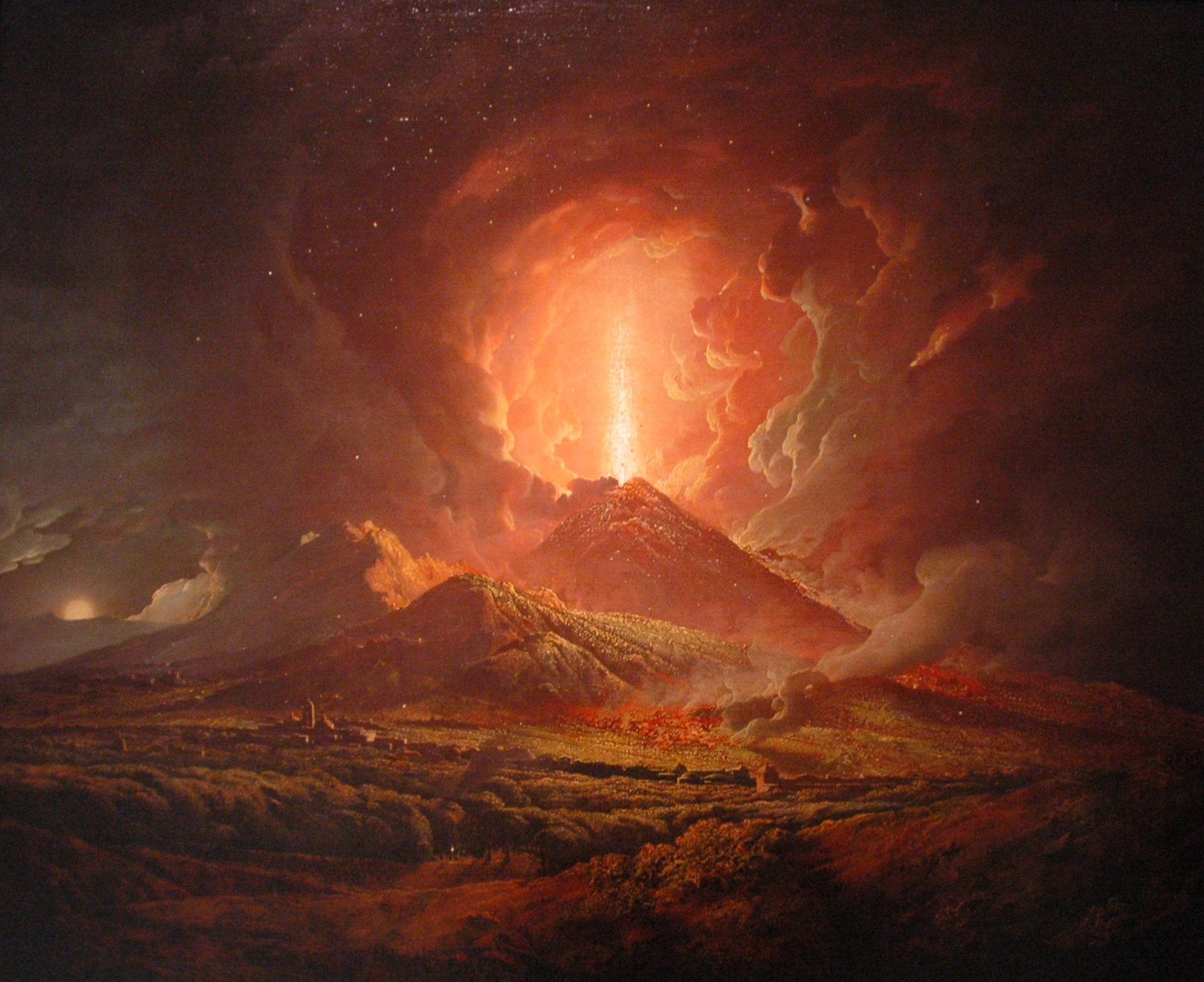
Vesuvius from Portici by Joseph Wright of Derby (Huntington Library, San Marino, California)

Vesuvius in Eruption is the subject of a series of thirty paintings and at least one preliminary sketch by Joseph Wright of Derby, who travelled in Italy in the years 1773-1775.

== The paintings ==
Wright is thought to have painted Vesuvius over thirty times in his career. One of Wright's Vesuvius paintings known as Vesuvius from Portici, is held at the Huntington Library at San Marino in California. A second, known by the title Vesuvius in Eruption, with a View over the Islands in the Bay of Naples is in Tate Britain in London. A third, Vesuvius from Posillipo, can be seen at the Yale Center for British Art, while a fourth, known under almost the same title, is in a private collection.

The painting in the Tate has been chemically analysed to find that the bright yellow is due to the element sulphur whilst the ground for the painting is based on gypsum rather than chalk and that has led to speculation that this was painted in Italy. It is not uncommon for Wright to arrange his compositions. The Tate painting does show the view to be between Sorrento and the Island of Capri, but from the walk up to Vesuvius you cannot see the two islands of Procida and Ischia which are included. Surprisingly it appears that at the time when Wright was in Italy, Vesuvius was not erupting, but he may have seen something that was briefly as impressive.

There is a gouache sketch of a view of Vesuvius, made in 1774 during Wright's Italian travels, among the collection of his works in Derby Museum and Art Gallery. This sketch is thought to be so quickly and carelessly done that it is thought to have been created at the scene. Benedict Nicolson, Wright's biographer, imagines him traveling up to the volcano with the vulcanologist and diplomat Sir William Hamilton who may have been a guide on these climbs.

== References in other works ==
It was said that one of Wright's Vesuvius paintings was commissioned by an Irish bishop. When the painting was near completion the bishop visited to see the work and presumably to try to reduce the price. The bishop made such deprecating comments about the work that Wright decided to keep the painting and this story was made into a poem by Wright's friend William Hayley and eventually published in The Reliquary.

The Portici painting is used as the cover art for Frederik Pohl's novel All the Lives He Led and also on the cover of The Vesuvian Affair by Cosima Zanardi.

== Other versions ==
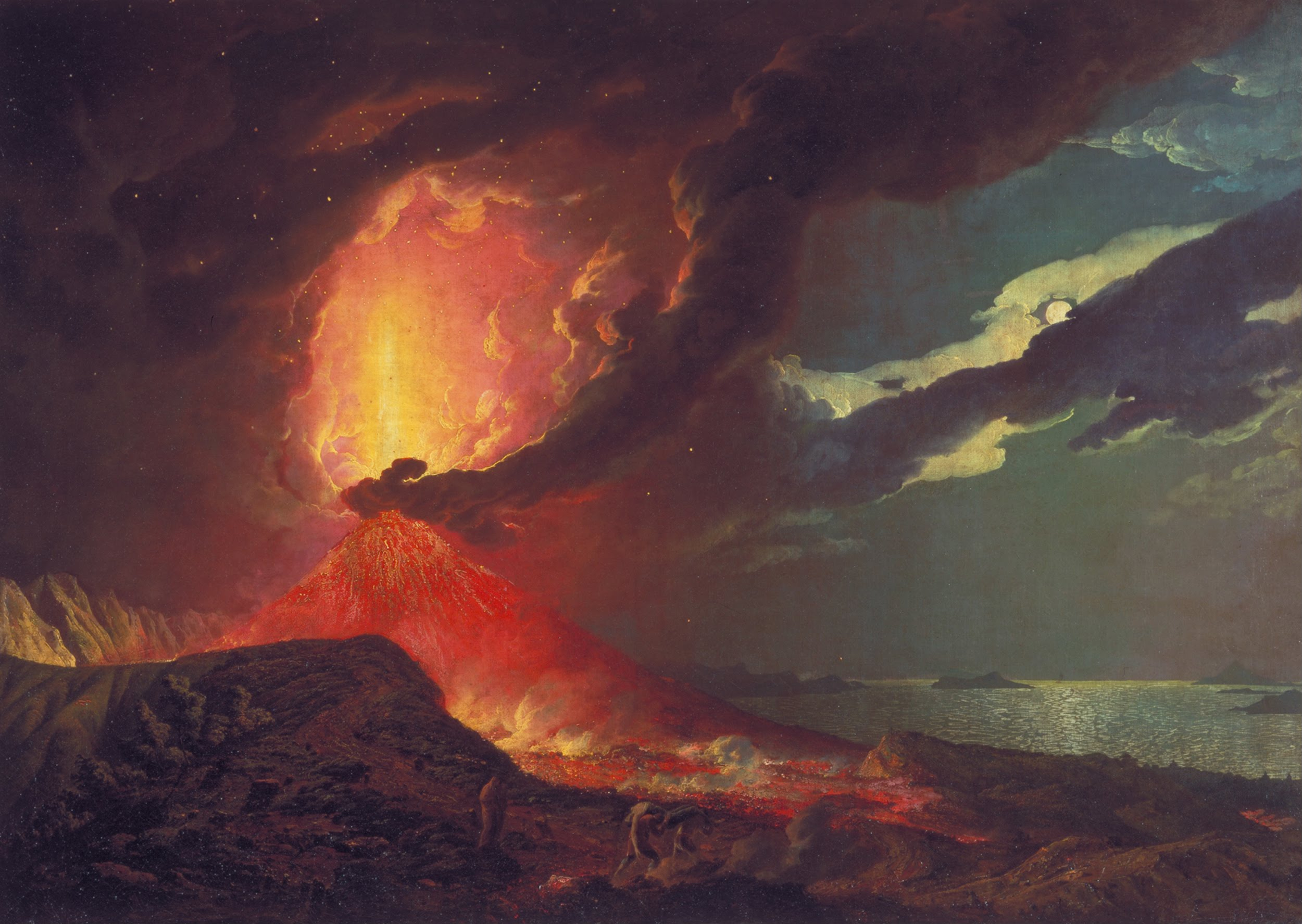
Vesuvius in Eruption, with a View over the Islands in the Bay of Naples (Tate Britain, London)

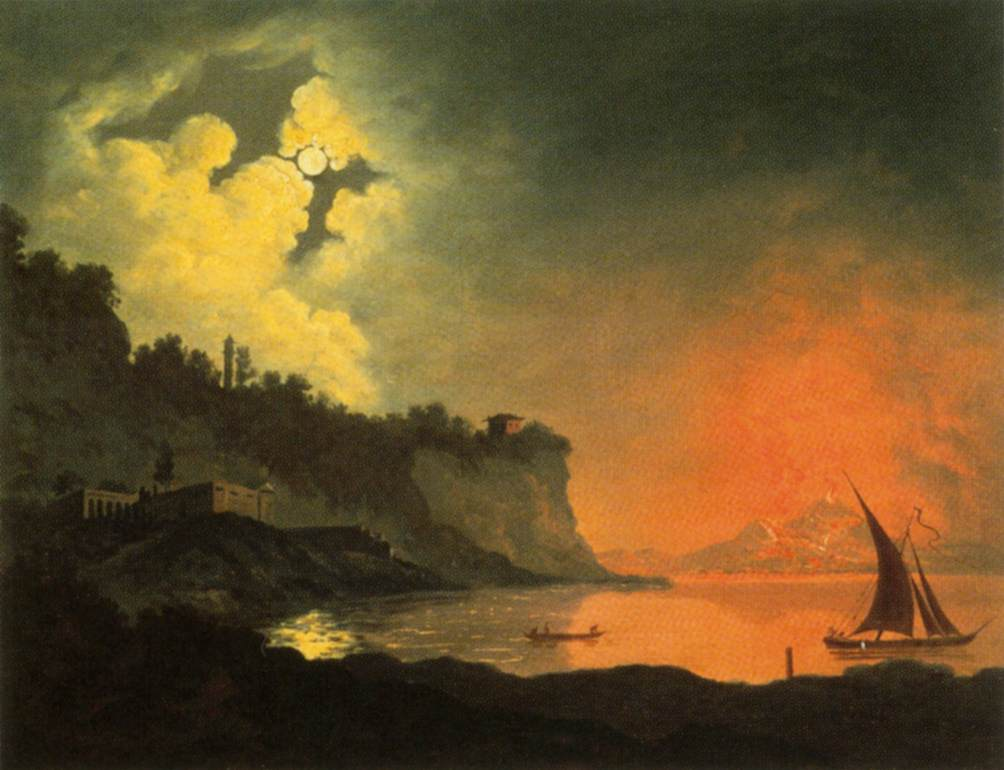
View of Vesuvius from Posillipo (private collection)

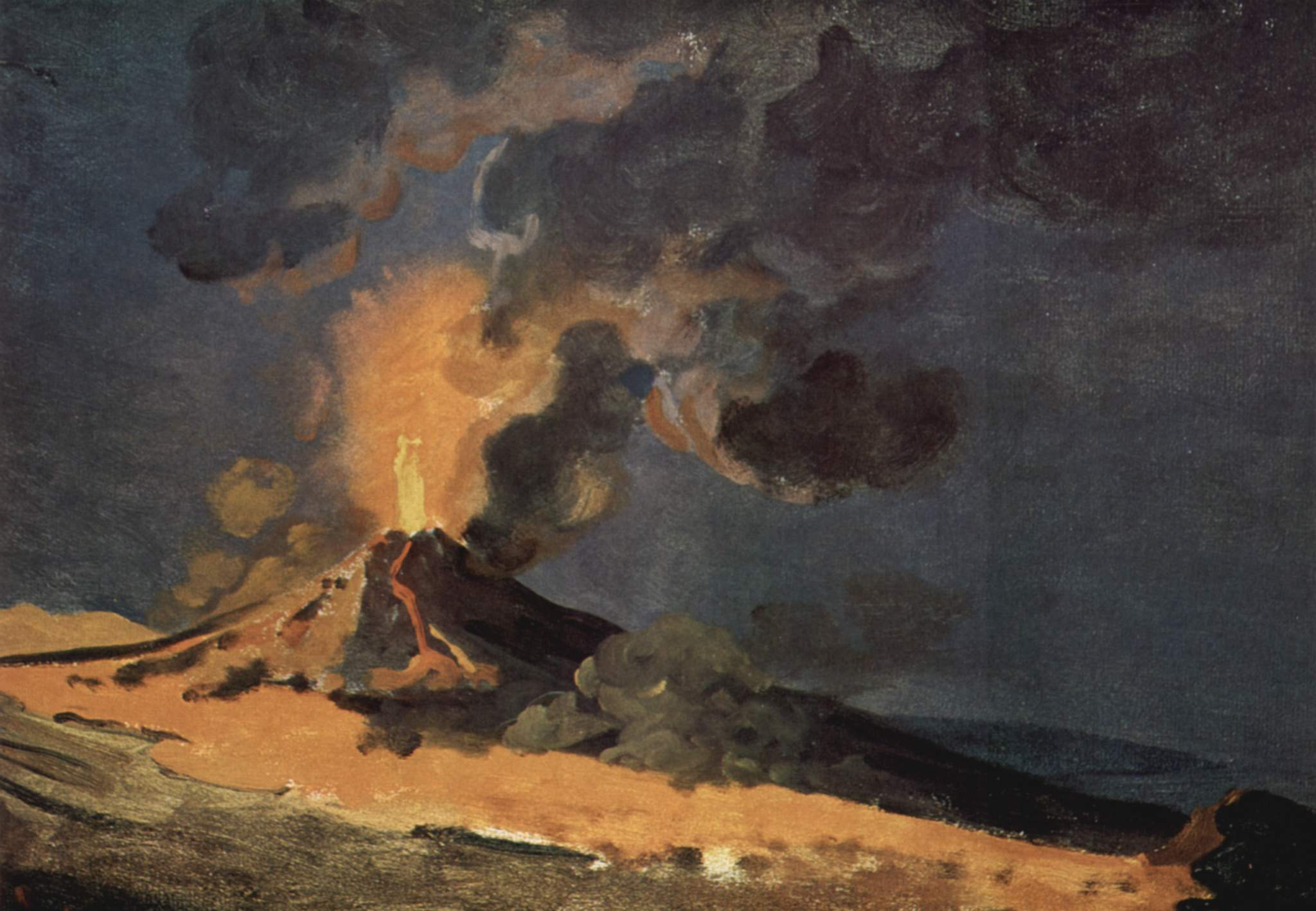
Colour sketch of 1774 (Derby Museum and Art Gallery)
