= List of lightning phenomena =

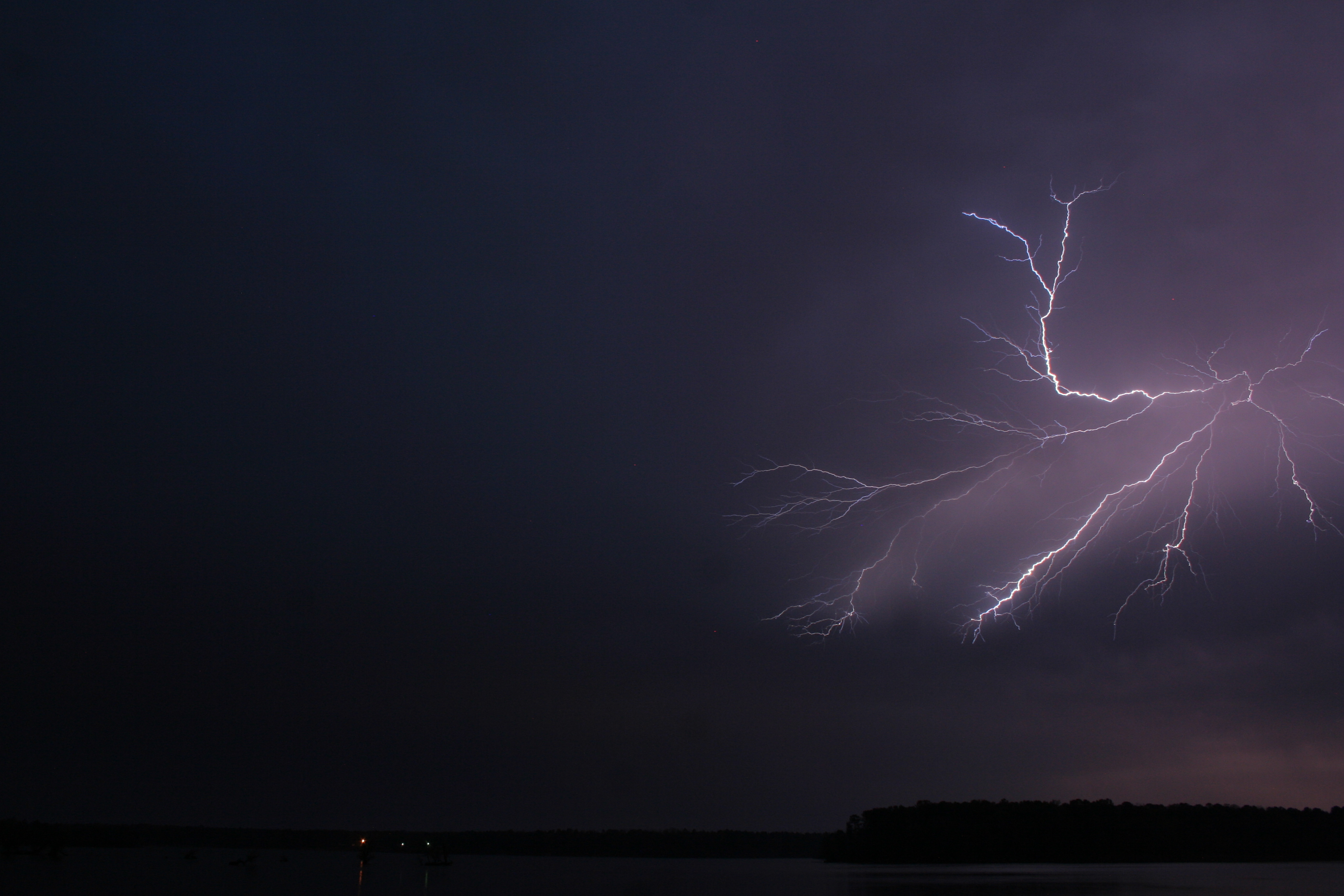
Anvil Crawler over Lake Wright Patman south of Redwater, Texas on the backside of a large area of rain associated with a cold-front

This is a list of lightning phenomena.

== Types ==
- Anvil crawler lightning, sometimes called spider lightning, is created when leaders propagate through horizontally-extensive charge regions in mature thunderstorms, usually the stratiform regions of mesoscale convective systems. These discharges usually begin as IC discharges originating within the convective region; the negative leader end then propagates well into the aforementioned charge regions in the stratiform area. If the leader becomes too long, it may separate into multiple bidirectional leaders. When this happens, the positive end of the separated leader may strike the ground as a positive CG flash or crawl on the underside of the cloud, creating a spectacular display of lightning crawling across the sky. Ground flashes produced in this manner tend to transfer high amounts of charge, and this can trigger upward lightning flashes and upper-atmospheric lightning.
- Ball lightning may be an atmospheric electrical phenomenon, the physical nature of which is still controversial. The term refers to reports of luminous, usually spherical objects which vary from pea-sized to several metres in diameter. It is sometimes associated with thunderstorms, but unlike lightning flashes, which last only a fraction of a second, ball lightning reportedly lasts many seconds. Ball lightning has been described by eyewitnesses but rarely recorded by meteorologists. Scientific data on natural ball lightning is scarce owing to its infrequency and unpredictability. The presumption of its existence is based on reported public sightings, and has therefore produced somewhat inconsistent findings. Brett Porter, a wildlife ranger, reported taking a photo in Queensland, Australia in 1987.
- Bead lightning, also known by the terms pearl lightning, chain lightning, perlschnurblitz, éclair en chapelet and others, is the decaying stage of a lightning channel in which the luminosity of the channel breaks up into segments. Nearly every lightning discharge will exhibit beading as the channel cools immediately after a return stroke, sometimes referred to as the lightning's 'bead-out' stage. 'Bead lightning' is more properly a stage of a normal lightning discharge rather than a type of lightning in itself. Beading of a lightning channel is usually a small-scale feature, and therefore is often only apparent when the observer/camera is close to the lightning.
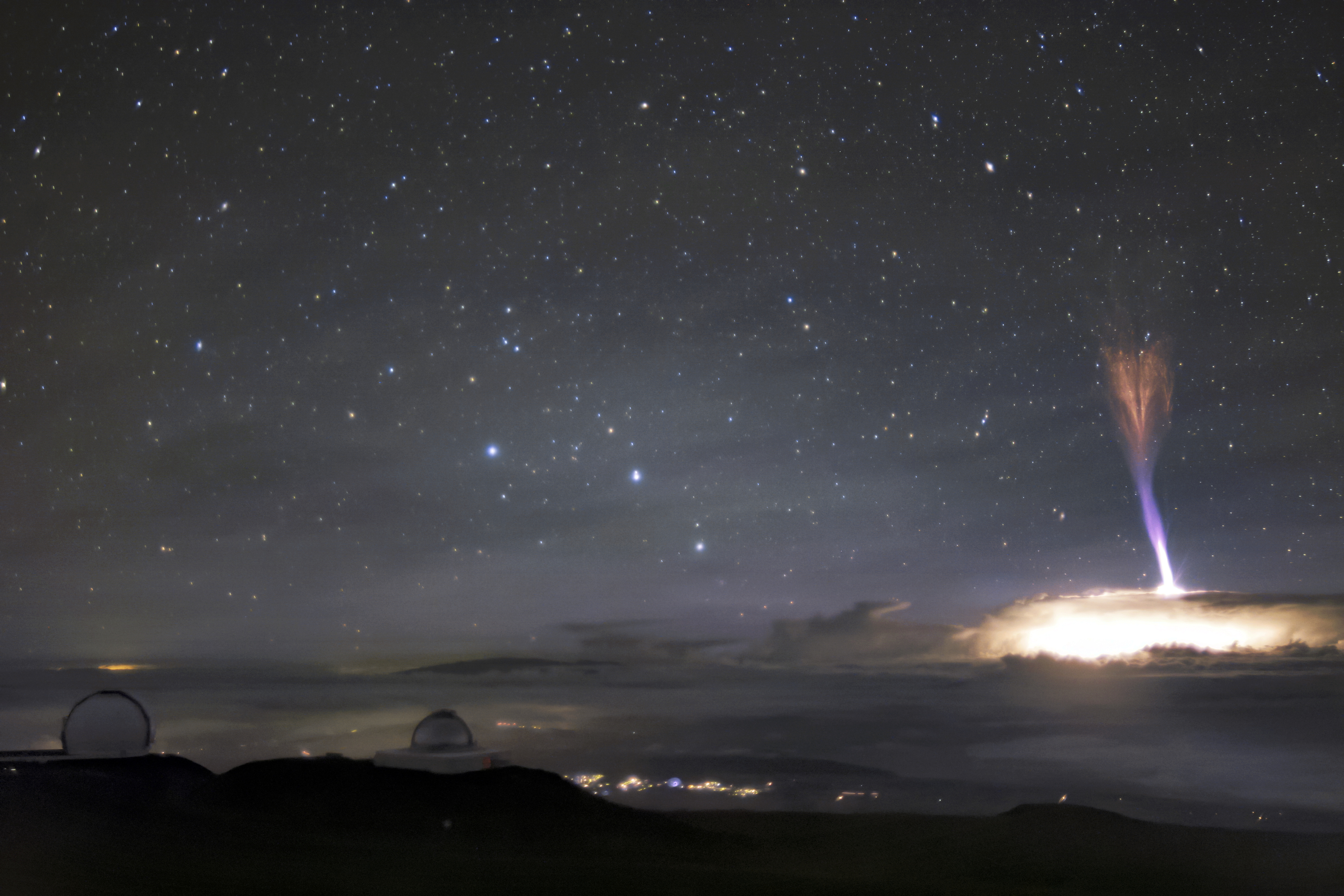
  Gigantic jet as seen from the summit of Mauna Kea, Hawaii.
- Clear-air lightning describes lightning that occurs with no apparent cloud close enough to have produced it. In the U.S. and Canadian Rockies, a thunderstorm can be in an adjacent valley and not observable from the valley where the lightning bolt strikes, either visually or audibly. European and Asian mountainous areas experience similar events. Also in areas such as sounds, large lakes or open plains, when the storm cell is on the near horizon (within 26 km or 16 mi) there may be some distant activity, a strike can occur and as the storm is so far away, the strike is referred to as a bolt from the blue. These flashes usually begin as normal IC lightning flashes before the negative leader exits the cloud and strikes the ground a considerable distance away. Positive clear-air strikes can occur in highly sheared environments where the upper positive charge region becomes horizontally displaced from the precipitation area.
- Cloud-to-air lightning is a lightning flash in which one end of a bidirectional leader exits the cloud, but does not result in a ground flash. Such flashes can sometimes be thought of as failed ground flashes. Blue jets and gigantic jets are a form of cloud-to-air or cloud-to-ionosphere lightning where a leader is launched from the top of a thunderstorm.
- Dry lightning is lightning that occurs with no precipitation at the surface and is the most common natural cause of wildfires. Pyrocumulus clouds produce lightning for the same reason that it is produced by cumulonimbus clouds. This term is mainly used in Australia, Canada, and the United States.
- Forked lightning is cloud-to-ground lightning that exhibits branching of its path.
- Heat lightning is a lightning flash that appears to produce no discernible thunder because it occurs too far away for the thunder to be heard. The sound waves dissipate before they reach the observer.
- Megaflash is a term for a lightning flash with a horizontal path length of approximately 100 km or greater, typically more than 5 seconds in duration. Megaflashes occur in mesoscale convective systems.
- Ribbon lightning occurs in thunderstorms with high cross winds and multiple return strokes. The wind will blow each successive return stroke slightly to one side of the previous return stroke, causing a ribbon effect.
- Rocket lightning is "a form of cloud discharge, generally horizontal and at cloud base, with a luminous channel appearing to advance through the air with visually resolvable speed, often intermittently."
- Sheet lightning is cloud-to-cloud lightning that exhibits a diffuse brightening of the surface of a cloud, caused by the actual discharge path being hidden or too far away. The lightning itself cannot be seen by the spectator, so it appears as only a flash, or a sheet of light. The lightning may be too far away to discern individual flashes.
- Smooth channel lightning is an informal term referring to a type of cloud-to-ground lightning strike that has no visible branching and appears like a line with smooth curves as opposed to the jagged appearance of most lightning channels. They are a form of positive lightning generally observed in or near the convective regions of severe thunderstorms in the north central United States. It is theorized that severe thunderstorms in this region obtain an "inverted tripole" charge structure in which the main positive charge region is located below the main negative charge region instead of above it, and as a result these thunderstorms generate predominantly positive cloud-to-ground lightning. The term "smooth channel lightning" is also sometimes attributed to upward ground-to-cloud lightning flashes, which are generally negative flashes initiated by upward positive leaders from tall structures.
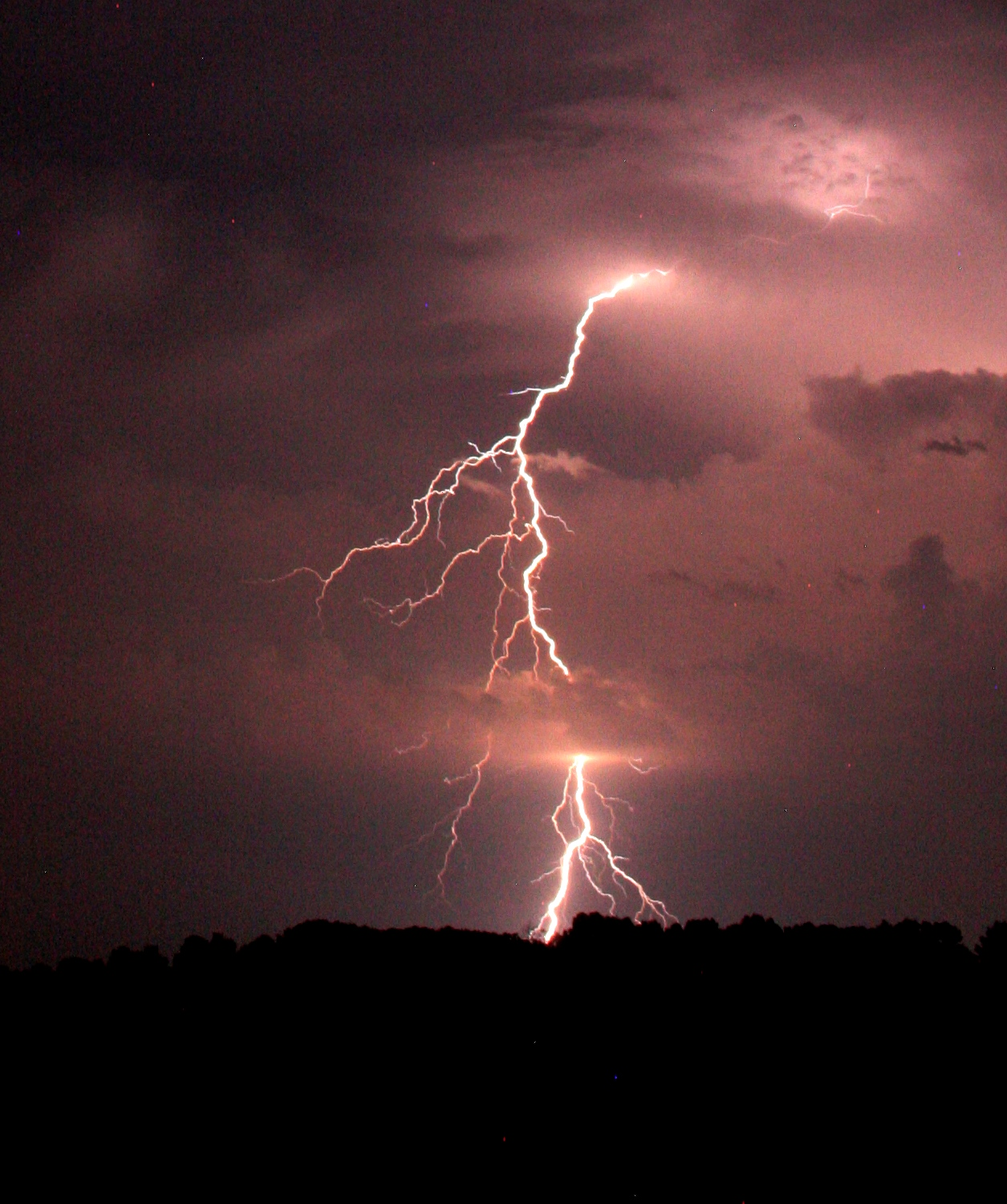
  This CG was of very short duration, exhibited highly branched channels and was very bright indicating that it was staccato lightning near New Boston, Texas.
- Staccato lightning is a cloud-to-ground lightning (CG) strike which is a short-duration stroke that (often but not always) appears as a single very bright flash and often has considerable branching. These are often found in the visual vault area near the mesocyclone of rotating thunderstorms and coincides with intensification of thunderstorm updrafts. A similar cloud-to-cloud strike consisting of a brief flash over a small area, appearing like a blip, also occurs in a similar area of rotating updrafts.
- Superbolts are rather loosely defined as strikes with a source energy of more than 100 gigajoule [100 GJ] (most lightning strikes come in at around 1 gigajoule [1 GJ]). Events of this magnitude occur about as frequently as one in 240 strikes. They are not categorically distinct from ordinary lightning strikes, and simply represent the uppermost edge of a continuum. Contrary to popular misconception, superbolts can be either positively or negatively charged, and the charge ratio is comparable to that of "ordinary" lightning.
- Sympathetic lightning is the tendency of lightning to be loosely coordinated across long distances. Discharges can appear in clusters when viewed from space.
- Upward lightning or ground-to-cloud lightning is a lightning flash which originates from the top of a grounded object and propagates upward from this point. This type of lightning can be triggered by a preceding lightning flash, or it may initiate entirely on its own. The former is generally found in regions where spider lightning occurs, and may involve multiple grounded objects simultaneously. The latter usually occurs during the cold season and may be the dominant lightning type in thundersnow events.
