= List of mountains of the Blue Ridge =

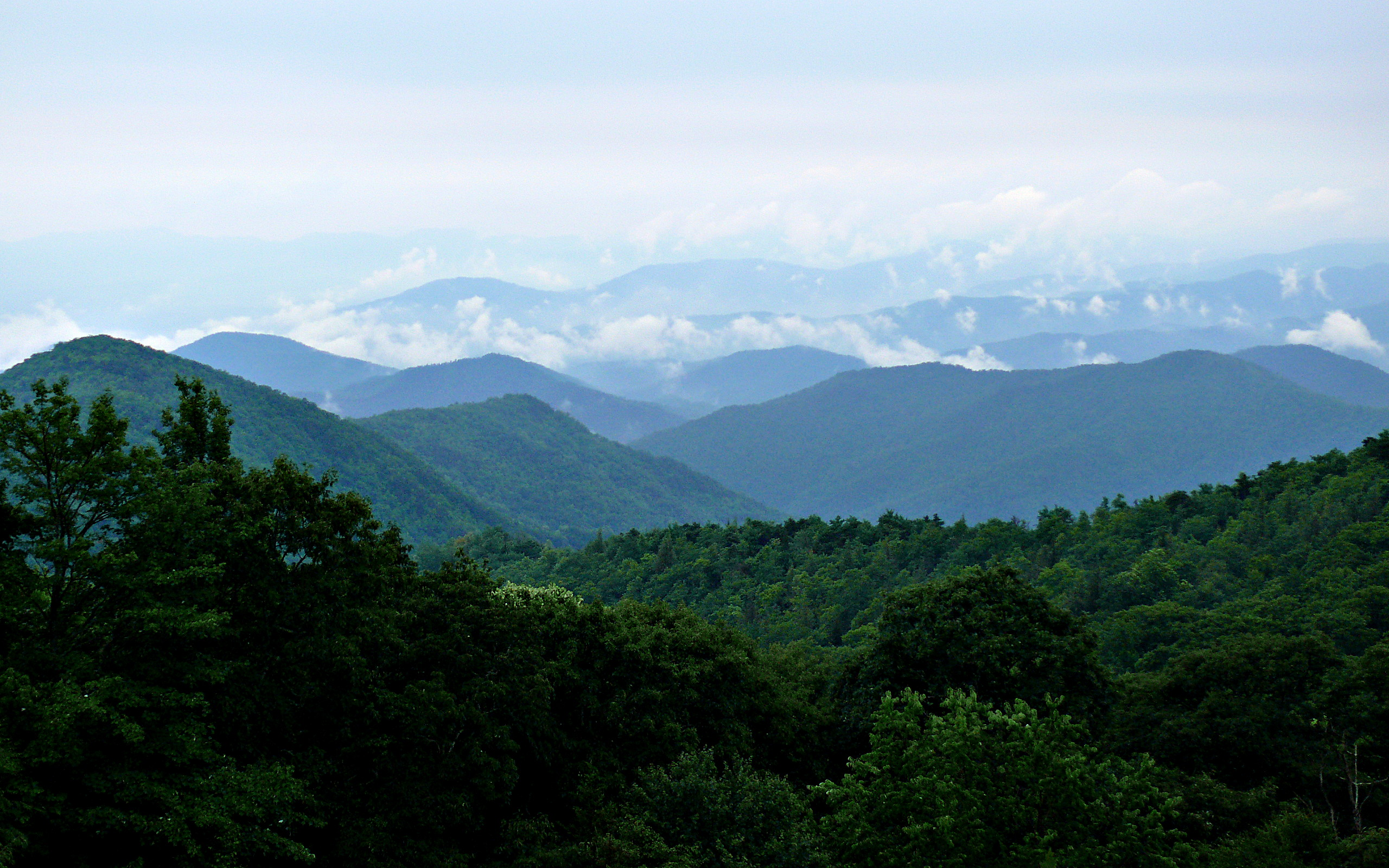
The Blue Ridge Mountains as seen from the Blue Ridge Parkway near Mount Mitchell.

The following is a list of mountains constituting the Blue Ridge, a mountain range stretching about 450 miles from Pennsylvania to Georgia in the USA. The Blue Ridge is part of the larger Appalachian Mountain Range.

== List of mountains (roughly from northeast to southwest) ==
- South Mountain, Pennsylvania/Maryland
- Catoctin Mountain, Maryland/Virginia
  - Sugarloaf Mountain, Maryland (possible outlier)
- Elk Ridge, Maryland
- Bull Run Mountains, Virginia
- Short Hill Mountain, Virginia
- Blue Ridge Mountain, Virginia
- The "Blue Ridge" proper, Shenandoah Nat'l Park, Virginia
  - Pignut Mountain, Virginia
  - Knob Mountain, Virginia
  - Neighbor Mountain, Virginia
  - Hawksbill Mountain, Virginia
  - Old Rag Mountain, Virginia
- Apple Orchard Mountain, Virginia
- Humpback Mountain, Virginia
- Southwest Mountains, Virginia
- Peaks of Otter, Virginia
- Poor Mountain, Virginia
- Brushy Mountain, North Carolina
- Holston Mountain, Tennessee / Virginia
- Iron Mountains, Tennessee / Virginia / North Carolina
- Sauratown Mountains, North Carolina
  - Moore's Knob, North Carolina
  - Pilot Mountain, North Carolina
- Three Top Mountain, North Carolina
- Tomkins Knob, North Carolina
- Fire Scale Mountain, North Carolina
- Howard Knob, North Carolina
- Rich Mountain, Watauga County, North Carolina
- Elk Knob, North Carolina
- Snake Mountain, North Carolina
- Rich Mountain Bald, North Carolina
- Crossing Knob, North Carolina
- Beech Mountain, North Carolina
- Hanging Rock, North Carolina
- Peak Mountain, North Carolina
- Sugar Mountain, North Carolina
- Flattop Mountain, North Carolina
- Brier Knob, Avery County, North Carolina
- Pixie Mountain, North Carolina
- Grandfather Mountain, North Carolina
- Grandmother Mountain, North Carolina
- Bee Mountain, North Carolina
- Spanish Oak Mountain, North Carolina
- Unaka Mountains, Tennessee/North Carolina
  - Big Yellow Mountain, North Carolina
  - Little Yellow Mountain, North Carolina
  - Grassy Ridge Bald, North Carolina
  - Roan Mountain, Tennessee/North Carolina
- Bald Mountains
  - Max Patch
- Chestnut Mountain, Caldwell County, North Carolina
- Little Chestnut Mountain, North Carolina
- Adams Mountain, North Carolina
- Brown Mountain Ridge, North Carolina
- Black Mountains, North Carolina
  - Mount Mitchell, North Carolina
  - Mount Craig, North Carolina
  - Celo Knob, North Carolina
- Great Craggy Mountains, North Carolina
- Great Balsam Mountains, North Carolina
  - Richland Balsam, North Carolina
  - Black Balsam Knob, North Carolina
  - Cold Mountain, North Carolina
  - Chestnut Mountain, Transylvania County, North Carolina
  - Shining Rock, North Carolina
- Plott Balsams, North Carolina
  - Waterrock Knob, North Carolina
- Great Smoky Mountains, Tennessee/North Carolina
  - Mount Cammerer
  - Old Black
  - Mount Guyot
  - Mount Chapman
  - Mount Sequoyah
  - Charlies Bunion
  - Mount Kephart
  - Mount Le Conte
  - Kuwohi
  - Silers Bald
  - Thunderhead Mountain
  - Gregory Bald
- Standing Indian Mountain, North Carolina
- Unicoi Mountains, Tennessee/North Carolina
- Big Frog Mountain, Tennessee
- Sassafras Mountain, North Carolina/South Carolina
- Pinnacle Mountain, South Carolina
- Springer Mountain, Georgia
- Blood Mountain, Georgia
- Brasstown Bald, Georgia
- Rabun Bald, Georgia
- Black Rock Mountain, Georgia
- Currahee Mountain, Georgia
- Sawnee Mountain, Georgia

== See also ==
- List of mountains of the Appalachians
