= List of mountains in North Carolina =

This article lists notable mountains in the U.S. state of North Carolina.

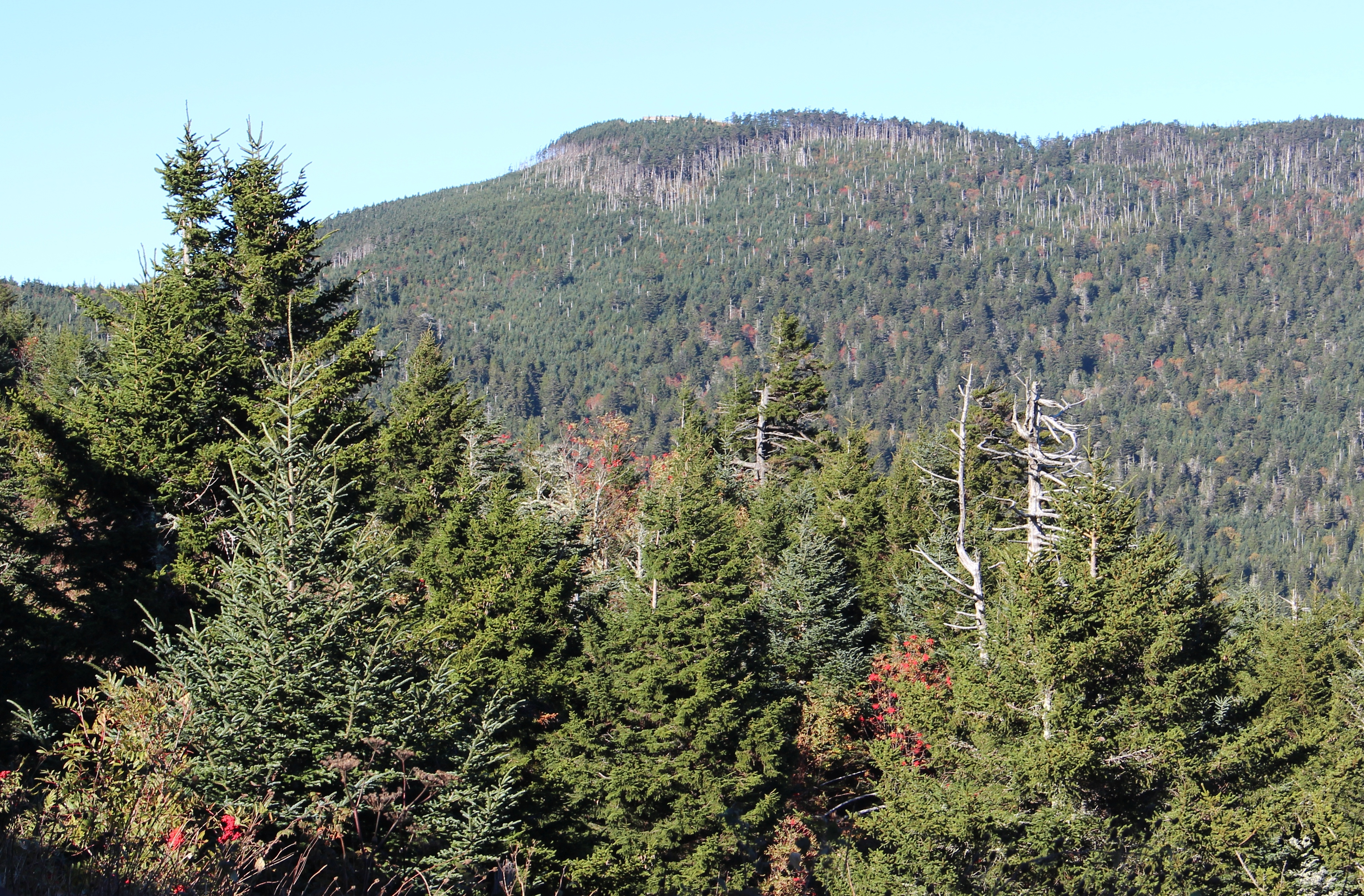
Mount Mitchell is the highest peak in the U.S. state of North Carolina

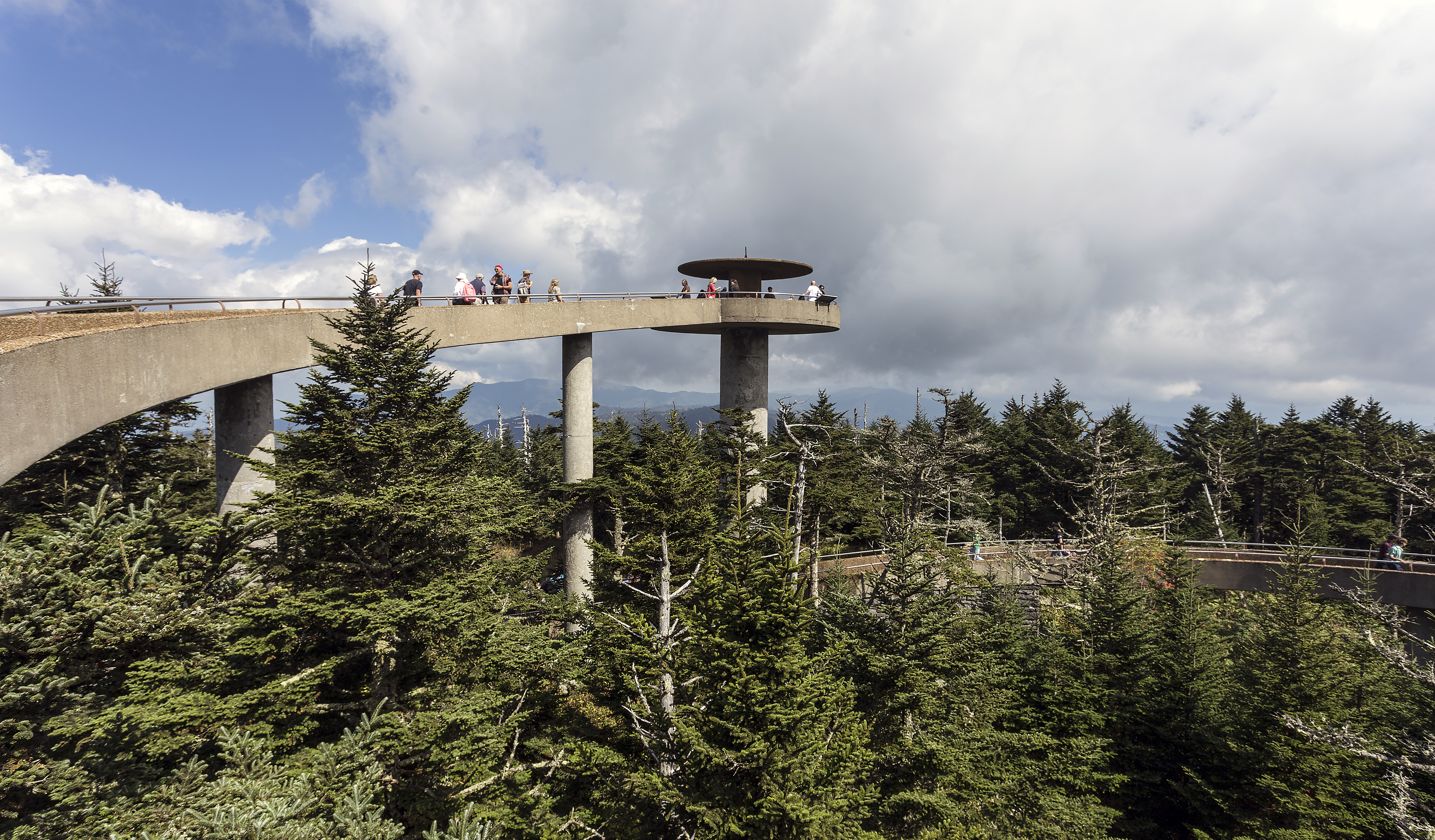
Kuwohi, third highest mountain in North Carolina

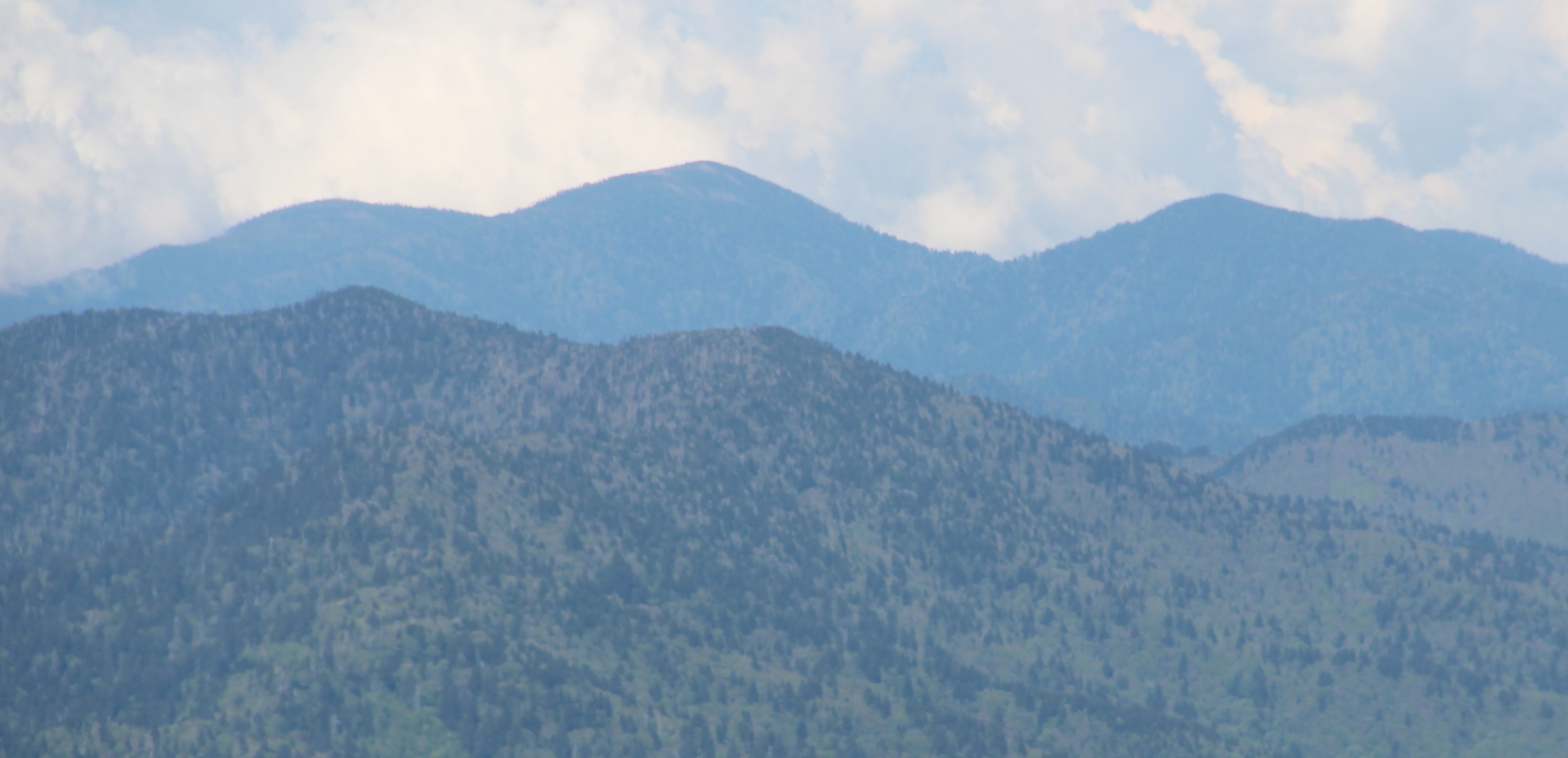
From left: Old Black, Mount Kephart, Mount Guyot and Mount Chapman, 9th, 16th, 4th, and 7th highest mountains, respectively, in North Carolina

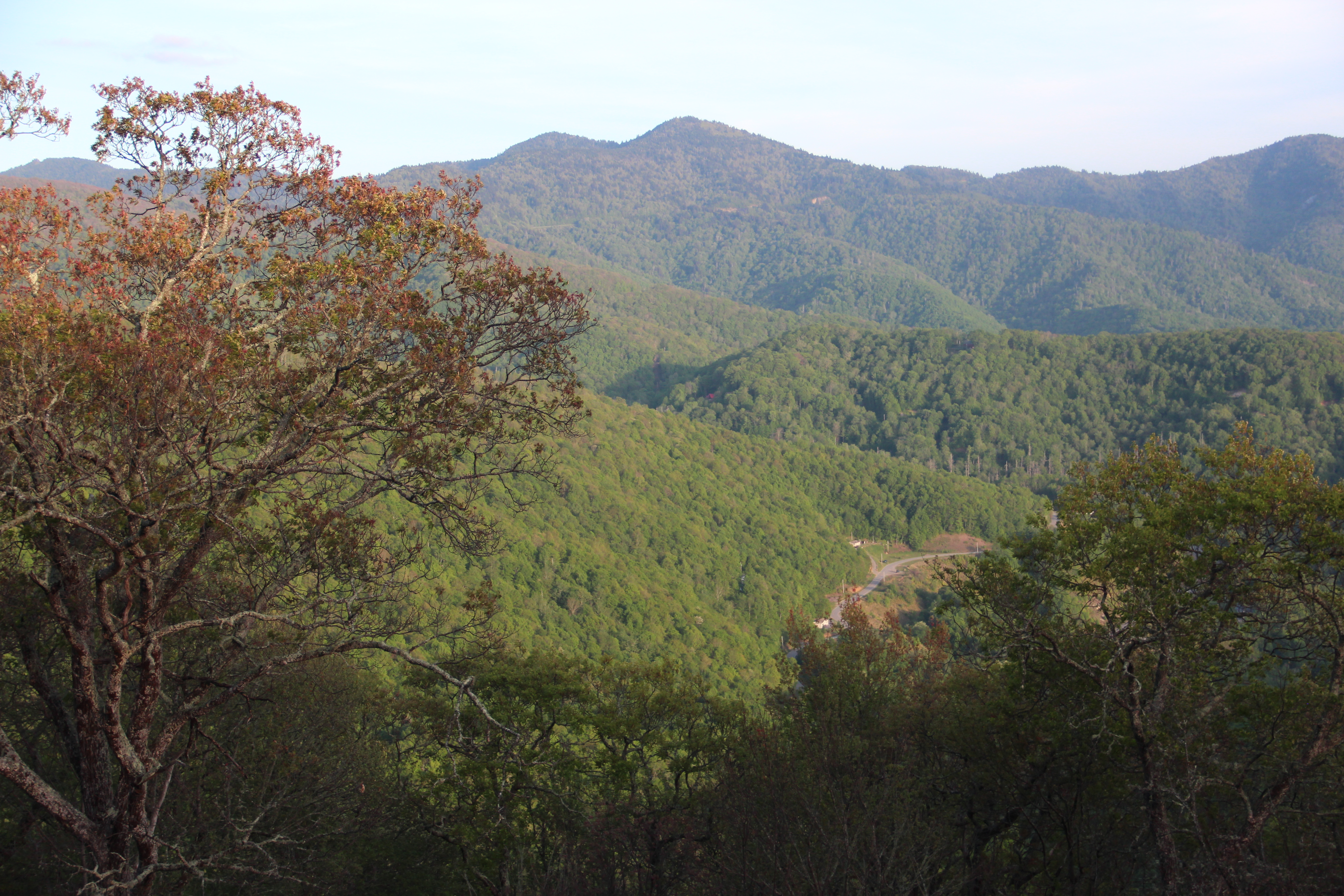
Waterrock Knob, 12th highest mountain in North Carolina

== Highest mountains ==
The following sortable table lists the 20 highest mountain peaks of North Carolina with at least 160 feet (49 m) of topographic prominence. Listings found elsewhere may not necessarily agree because they do not include each of these mountains.

The 20 highest summits of North Carolina with at least 160 feet of topographic prominence
Rank	Summit	Mountain Range	Elevation	Prominence	Isolation	Location
1	Mount Mitchell (Note: Highest mountain in eastern North America.)	Black Mountains	6,684 ft 2037 m	6,094 ft 1857 m	1,189 mi 1,913 km	35°45′53″N 82°15′54″W
2	Mount Craig	Black Mountains	6,647 ft 2026 m	285 ft 87 m	0.89 mi 1.44 km	35°46′39″N 82°15′42″W
3	Kuwohi (Note: Partially in Tennessee; highest mountain in Tennessee.)	Great Smoky Mountains	6,643 ft 2025 m	4,505 ft 1373 m	70.7 mi 113.9 km	35°33′47″N 83°29′55″W
4	Mount Guyot (Note: Partially in Tennessee.)	Great Smoky Mountains	6,621 ft 2018 m	1,581 ft 482 m	16.74 mi 26.9 km	35°42′19″N 83°15′28″W
5	Balsam Cone	Black Mountains	6,600 ft 2012 m	360 ft 110 m	0.9 mi 1.45 km	35°47′23″N 82°15′21″W
6	Mount Gibbes	Black Mountains	6,520 ft 1987 m	400 ft 122 m	2.1 mi 3.38 km	35°44′21″N 82°17′07″W
7	Mount Chapman (Note: Partially in Tennessee.)	Great Smoky Mountains	6,417 ft 1956 m	577 ft 176 m	1.49 mi 2.39 km	35°41′12″N 83°16′16″W
8	Richland Balsam	Great Balsam Mountains	6,410 ft 1954 m	3,010 ft 917 m	27.1 mi 43.6 km	35°22′03″N 82°59′25″W
9	Old Black (Note: Partially in Tennessee.)	Great Smoky Mountains	6,370 ft 1942 m	170 ft 52 m	0.68 mi 1.1 km	35°42′54″N 83°15′20″W
10	Celo Knob	Black Mountains	6,327 ft 1928 m	607 ft 185 m	3.52 mi 5.66 km	35°51′09″N 82°14′55″W
11	Blackstock Knob	Black Mountains	6,320 ft 1926 m	440 ft 134 m	1.6 mi 2.57 km	35°44′17″N 82°19′07″W
12	Waterrock Knob	Plott Balsams	6,292 ft 1918 m	1,947 ft 593 m	10.7 mi 17.22 km	35°27′51″N 83°08′16″W
13	Roan High Knob (Note: Partially in Tennessee.)	Unaka Range	6,285 ft 1916 m	3,485 ft 1062 m	18.8 mi 30.3 km	36°06′16″N 82°07′21″W
14	Mount Lyn Lowry	Plott Balsams	6,240 ft 1902 m	360 ft 110 m	1.5 mi 2.41 km	35°27′49″N 83°06′38″W
15	Luftee Knob	Great Smoky Mountains	6,234 ft 1900 m	314 ft 96 m	2.5 mi 4.02 km	35°41′33″N 83°12′55″W
16	Mount Kephart (Note: Partially in Tennessee.)	Great Smoky Mountains	6,217 ft 1895 m	657 ft 200 m	2.8 mi 4.51 km	35°37′52″N 83°23′24″W
17	Black Balsam Knob	Great Balsam Mountains	6,214 ft 1894 m	989 ft 301 m	7.1 mi 11.43 km	35°19′41″N 82°52′28″W
18	Winter Star Mountain	Black Mountains	6,203 ft 1891 m	283 ft 86 m	1.1 mi 1.77 km	35°49′04″N 82°14′57″W
19	Mount Collins (Note: Partially in Tennessee.)	Great Smoky Mountains	6,188 ft 1886 m	465 ft 142 m	1.7 mi 2.74 km	35°35′11″N 83°28′23″W
20	Marks Knob	Great Smoky Mountains	6,169 ft 1880 m	249 ft 76 m	1.4 mi 2.25 km	35°40′48″N 83°14′55″W

== Other mountains ==
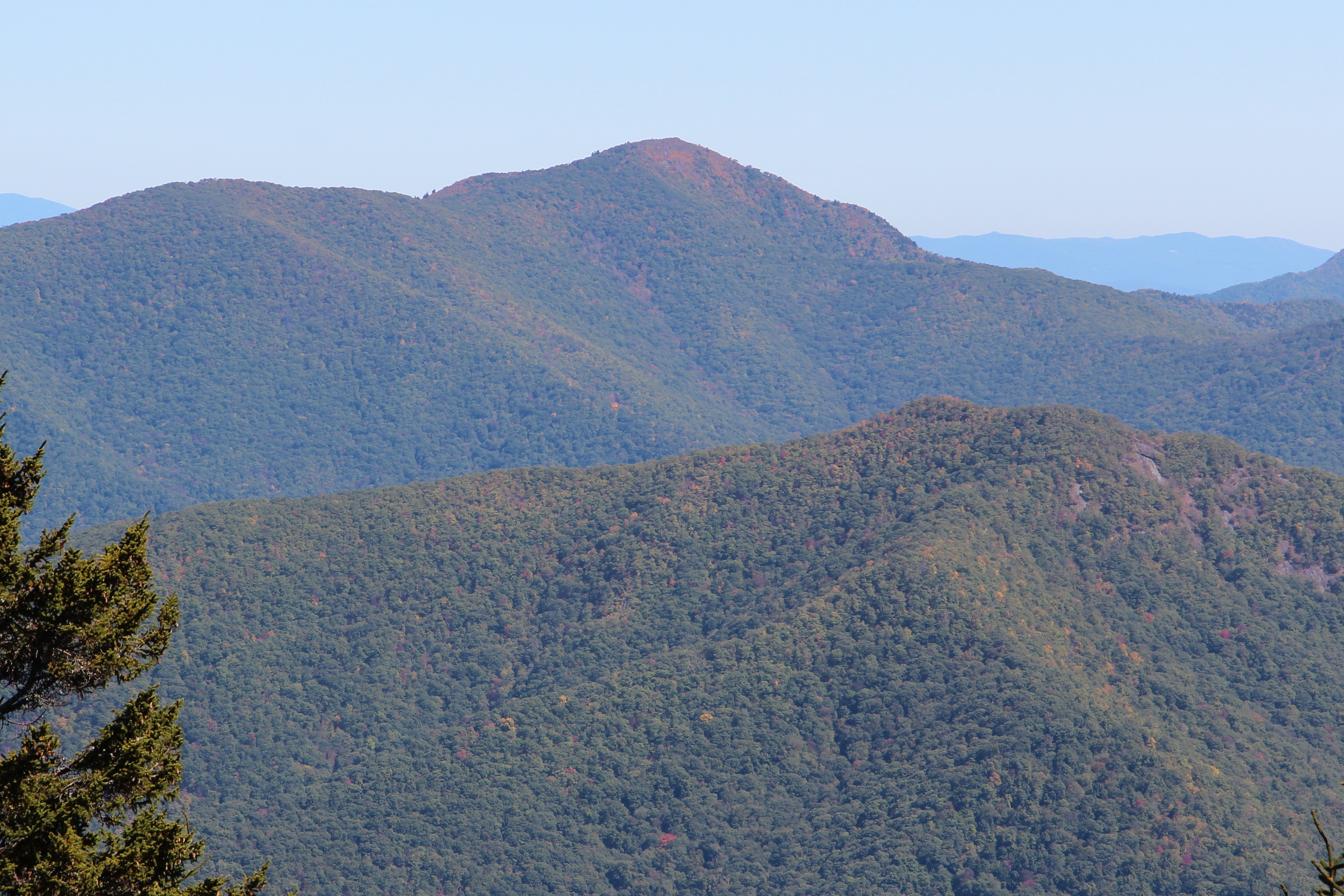
Cold Mountain

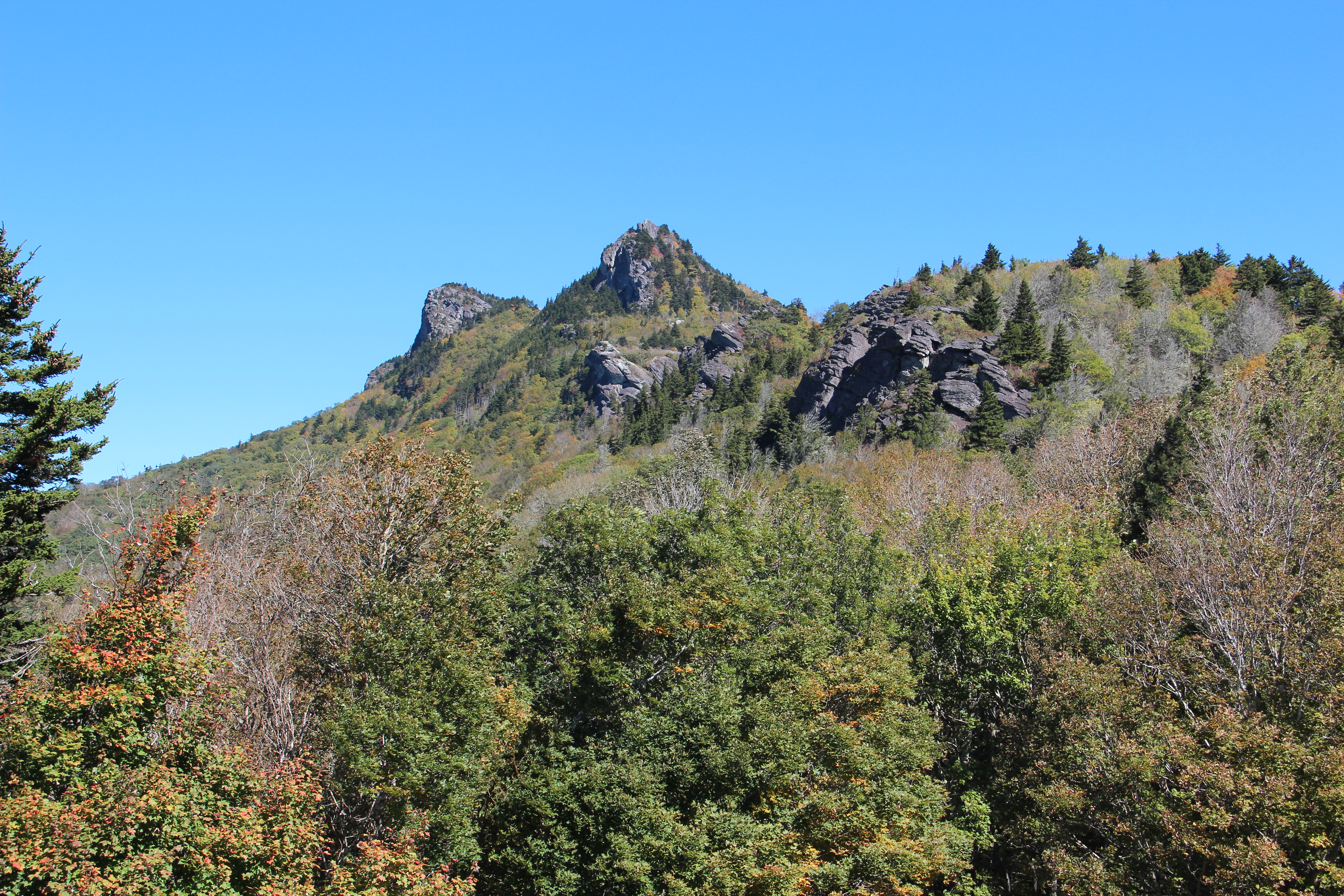
Grandfather Mountain

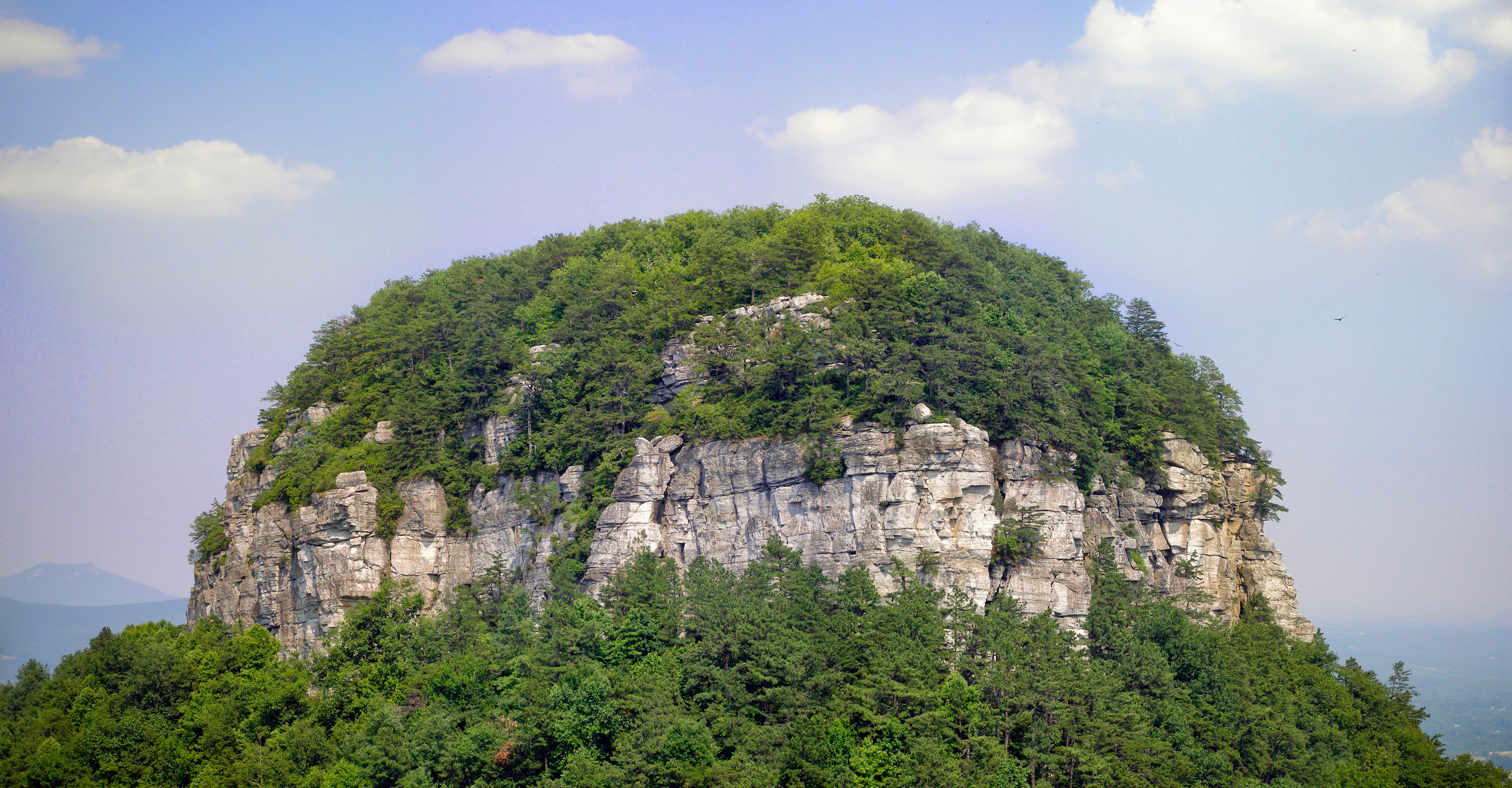
Pilot Mountain

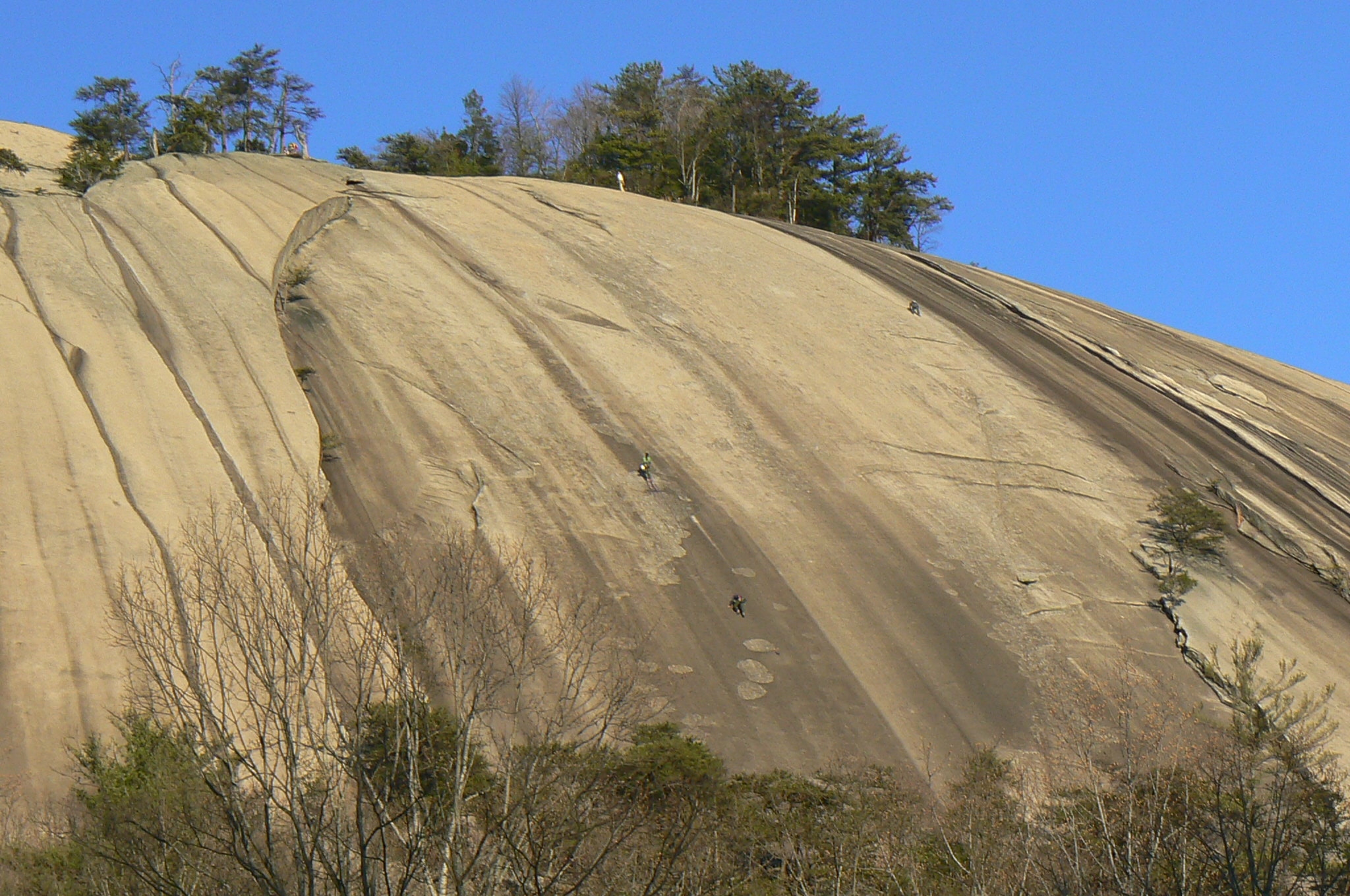
Stone Mountain

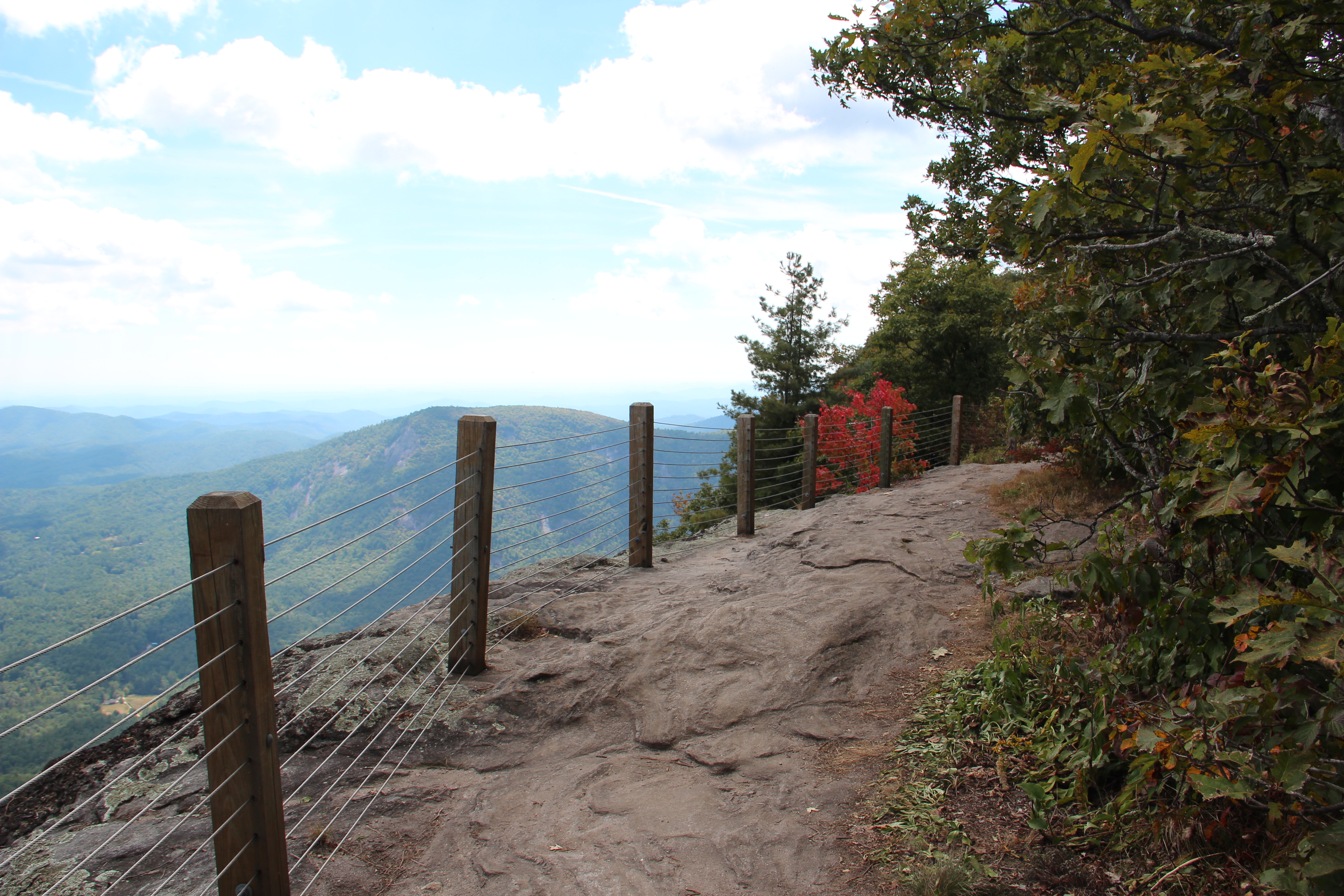
Whiteside Mountain

- Adams Mountain
- Albert Mountain
- Andrews Bald
- Bear's Paw
- Beaucatcher Mountain
- Bee Mountain
- Beech Mountain
- Big Butt Mountain
- Big Yellow Mountain
- Black Mountains
- Bluerock Mountain
- Blackwood Mountain, Hillsborough, North Carolina
- Bob Stratton Bald
- Brier Knob
- Brown Mountain
- Brushy Mountains
- Chestnut Mountain (Caldwell County, North Carolina)
- Chestnut Mountain (Transylvania County, North Carolina)
- Crowders Mountain
- Cold Mountain
- Crowder's Mountain
- Devil's Courthouse
- Eaglenest Mountain
- Flattop Mountain
- Grandfather Mountain
- Grandmother Mountain
- Great Craggy Mountains
- Great Smoky Mountains
- Gregory Bald
- Hanging Rock
- Hanging Rock State Park
- Hibriten Mountain
- Humpback Mountain
- King's Pinnacle
- Little Yellow Mountain
- Looking Glass Rock
- Max Patch
- Morrow Mountain
- Moore's Knob
- Mount Hardison
- Mount Jefferson
- Mount Pisgah
- North Eaglenest Mountain
- Occoneechee Mountain
- Old Butt Knob
- Peak Mountain
- Pilot Mountain
- Pixie Mountain
- Rich Mountain
- Rich Mountain Bald
- Saura Mountains
- Scaly Mountain
- Shining Rock
- Shuckstack
- Silers Bald
- Snake Mountain
- Standing Indian Mountain
- Stone Mountain
- Sugar Mountain
- Tanasee Bald
- Three Top Mountain
- Thunderhead Mountain
- Tricorner Knob
- Unicoi Mountains
- Uwharrie Mountains
- Whiteside Mountain
- Wayah Bald
- Woody's Knob

== See also ==
- List of mountains of the Appalachians
- List of mountains in the United States
- Geography of North Carolina
- Southern Sixers
