= Chestnut Mountain (disambiguation) =

Chestnut Mountain is a ski resort in Galena, Illinois.

Chestnut Mountain can also refer to the following places in the United States:

- Chestnut Mountain, Georgia, an unincorporated community
- Chestnut Mountain (Caldwell County, North Carolina), a mountain
- Chestnut Mountain (Transylvania County, North Carolina), a mountain

== See also ==
- Little Chestnut Mountain, a mountain in North Carolina
