= Junaluska (disambiguation) =

Junaluska may refer to:

- Junaluska, a leader of the Cherokee people
- Junaluska (community), an African-American community in Boone, North Carolina
- Lake Junaluska, North Carolina, a census-designated place
- Mount Junaluska, a mountain in Haywood County, North Carolina now called North Eaglenest Mountain\

== See also ==
- Junaluska salamander
