= Adams Mountain =

Mountain in North Carolina, United States of America

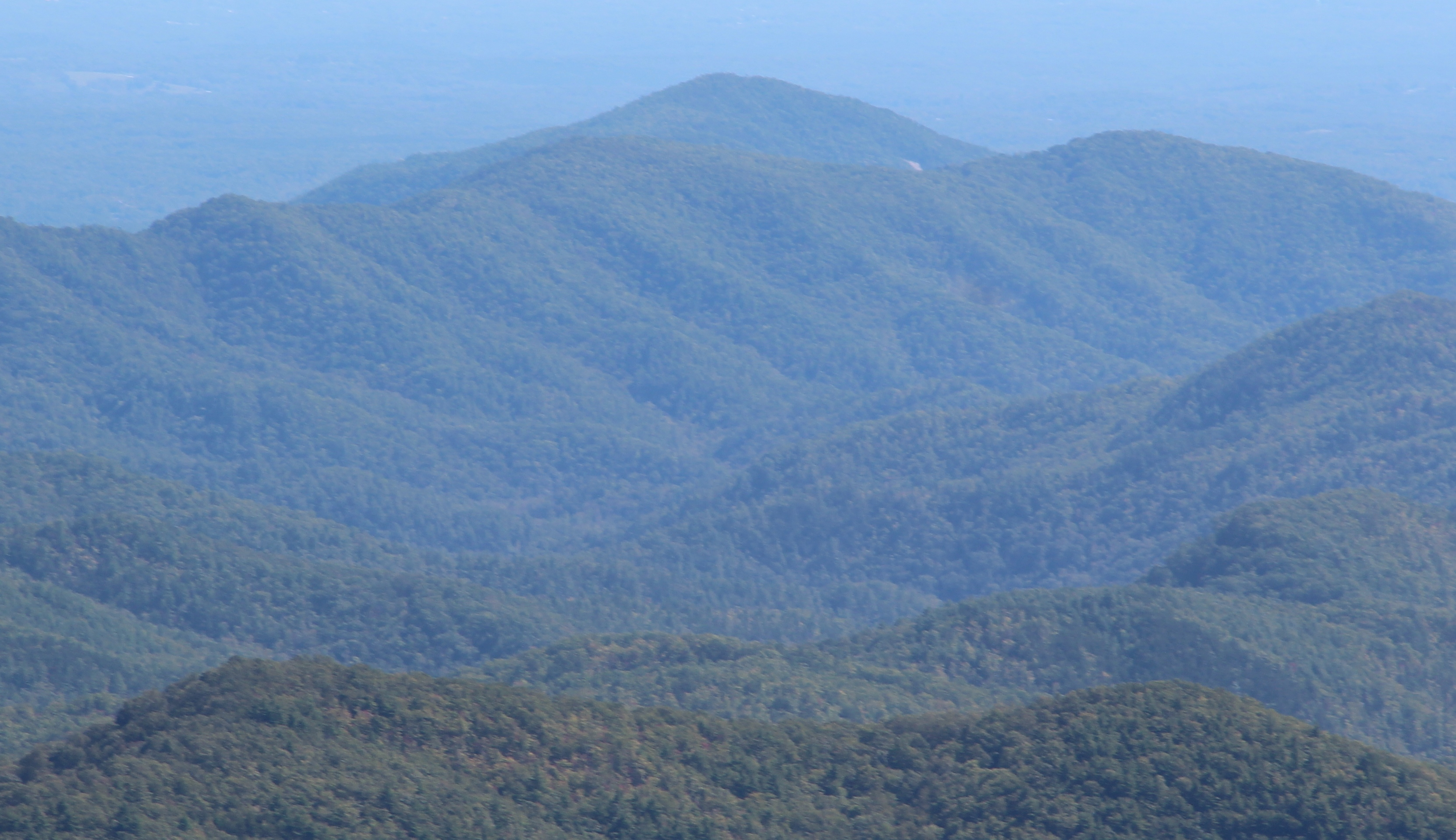
- Adams Mountain viewed from Beacon Heights

Highest point
- Elevation: 2,490 ft (760 m)
- Coordinates: 35°55′52″N 81°43′28″W

Geography
- Location within North Carolina
- Location: Caldwell County, North Carolina, U.S.
- Parent range: Blue Ridge Mountains
- Topo map: USGS Collettsville

Adams Mountain (variant name: Adams Knob) is a mountain near the unincorporated community of Collettsville, North Carolina. It is situated wholly within Pisgah National Forest. It reaches 2,490 feet (759 m) and is nearby Brown Mountain Ridge, which is known for its mysterious Brown Mountain Lights. Adams Mountain rises along the eastern rim of Wilson Creek Gorge. Its slopes generate feeder streams for Wilson Creek as it flows towards the Catawba River.

== See also ==
- List of mountains in North Carolina
