= Linville Historic District =

Historic district in North Carolina, United States

- U.S. National Register of Historic Places
- U.S. Historic district
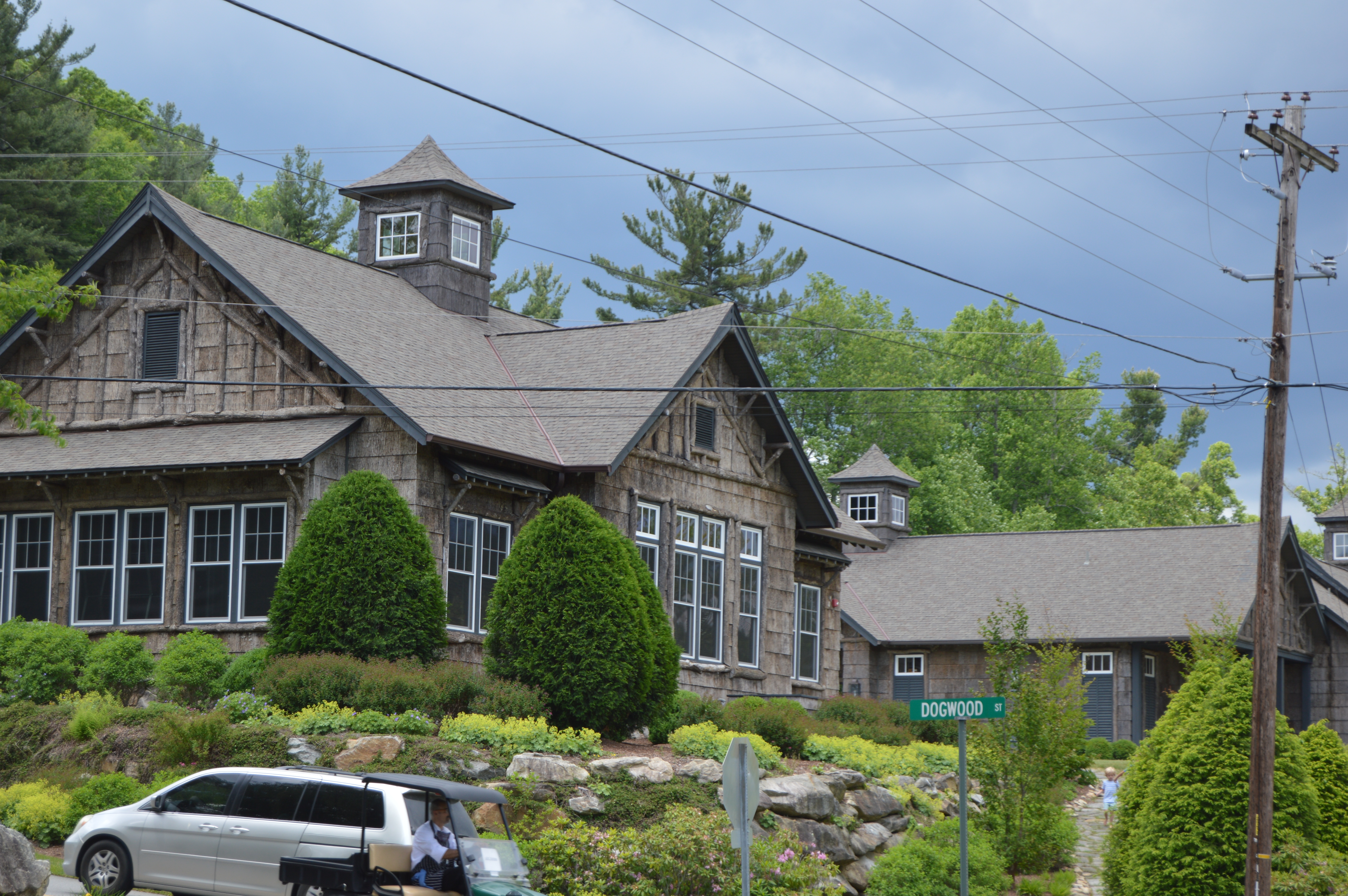
- Buildings on Linville Avenue

- Location within North Carolina Location within the United States
- Location: Linville Avenue, Linville, North Carolina
- Coordinates: 36°3′58″N 81°52′10″W
- Area: 140 acres (57 ha)
- Built: 1892
- Architect: Henry Bacon, et al.
- Architectural style: Late 19th And 20th Century Revivals, Shingle Style, Neo-Tudor
- NRHP reference No.: 79001659
- Added to NRHP: March 7, 1979

Linville Historic District is a historic school campus and national historic district located at Linville, Avery County, North Carolina. It encompasses 96 contributing buildings and 4 contributing structures in the historic core of Linville. The buildings date between about 1892 and 1940, and include shingle-or chestnut bark-covered resort buildings and the second generation of houses flanking the first and eighteenth fairways of the golf course. Notable buildings include the Hemlock Cottage, Dormiecroft, "Honeymoon" Cottage, Presbyterian Church, The Studio, the VanLandingham House, and All Saints Episcopal Church.

It was listed on the National Register of Historic Places in 1979.
