= Little Chestnut Mountain =

Mountain in North Carolina, United States

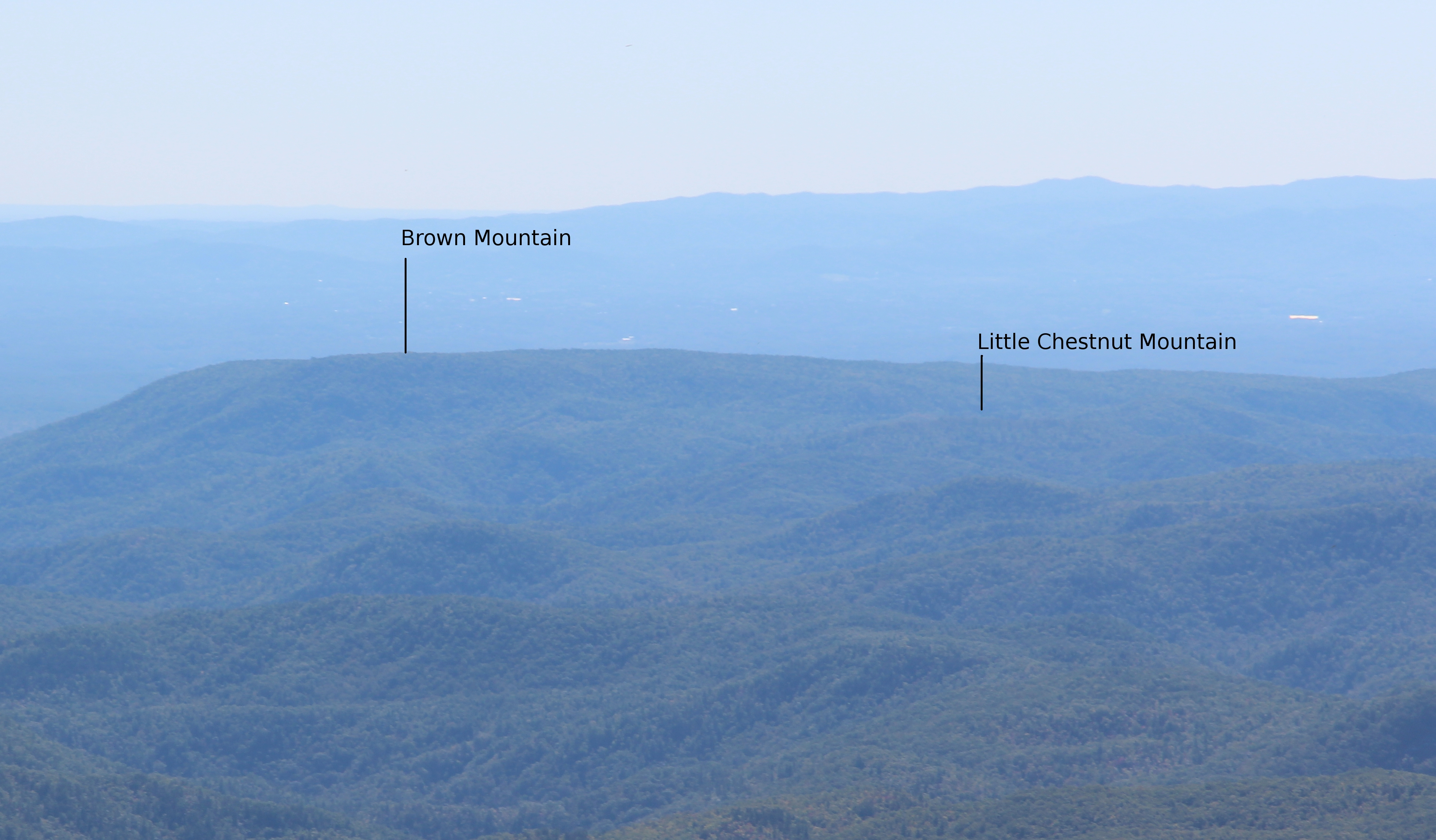
- Brown Mountain (left) and Little Chestnut Mountain viewed from Grandfather Mountain

Highest point
- Elevation: 2,480 ft (760 m)
- Coordinates: 35°56′27″N 81°46′36″W

Geography
- Location: Burke County / Caldwell County, North Carolina, U.S.
- Parent range: Blue Ridge Mountains
- Topo map: USGS Chestnut Mountain

Chestnut Mountain is a mountain in the North Carolina High Country, United States, and wholly in the Pisgah National Forest. Its elevation reaches 2,480 feet (756 m) and is split between Burke County and Caldwell counties. The mountain generates feeder streams for the Catawba River.

== See also ==
- List of mountains in North Carolina
