= Linville, North Carolina =

- Census-designated place
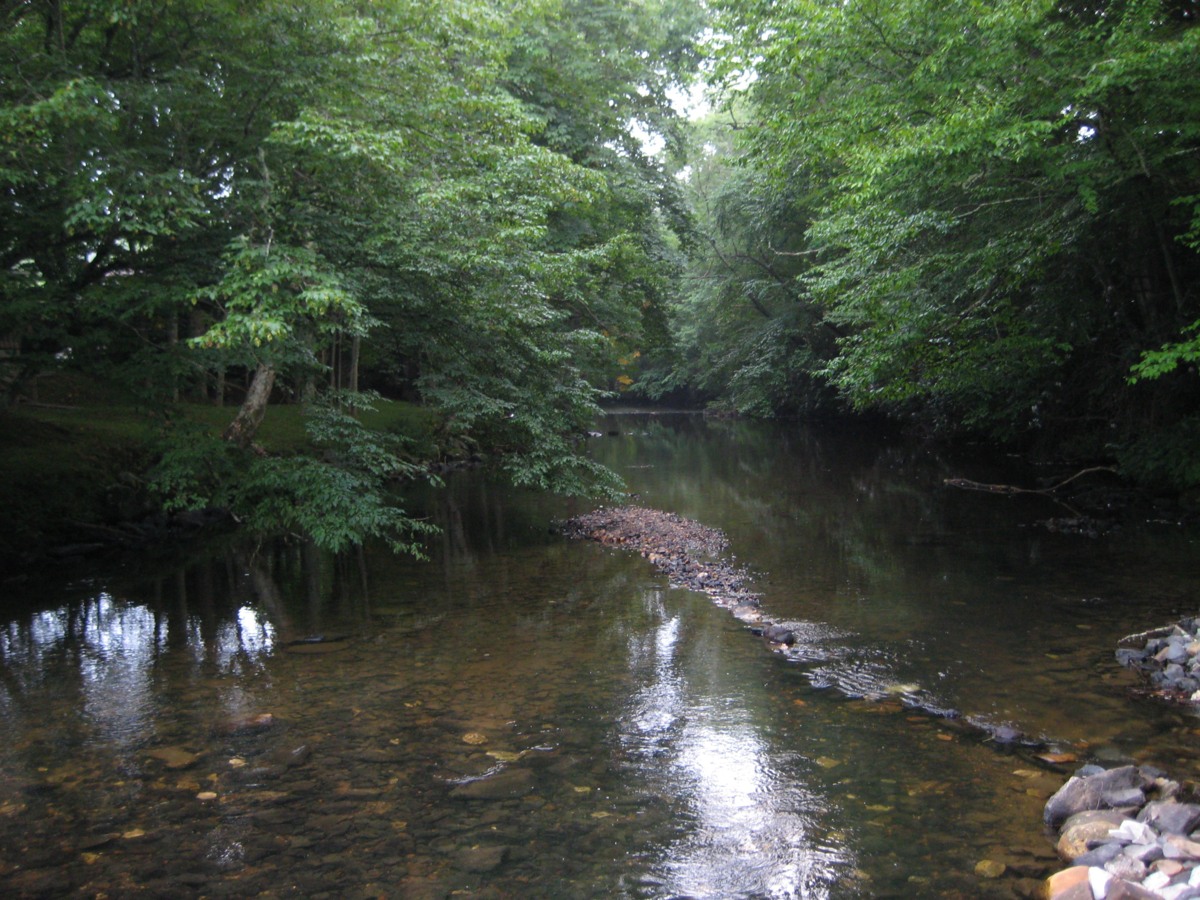
- Linville River

- Location within the state of North Carolina
- Coordinates: 36°04′03″N 81°52′17″W
- Country: United States
- State: North Carolina
- County: Avery
- Founded: 1883
- Named after: William and John Linville

Area
  - Total: 1.78 sq mi (4.62 km^{2})
  - Land: 1.78 sq mi (4.62 km^{2})
  - Water: 0 sq mi (0.00 km^{2})
- Elevation: 3,665 ft (1,117 m)

Population (2020)
  - Total: 283
  - Density: 158.6/sq mi (61.23/km^{2})
- Time zone: UTC-5 (Eastern (EST))
  - Summer (DST): UTC-4 (EDT)
- ZIP code: 28646
- Area code: 828
- GNIS feature ID: 2812776

Linville is an unincorporated community and census-designated place (CDP) in Avery County, North Carolina, United States. It was first listed as a CDP in the 2020 census with a population of 283. Centered just south of US 221 and NC 105, the community is known as a summer mountain resort and host of the Grandfather Mountain Highland Games, the largest modern Highland games events in North Carolina.

== History ==
The community—at times known as Clay or Porcelain—was founded in 1883 and designed by Samuel T. Kelsey of Kansas, and named for William and John Linville, who were killed by Cherokees in 1766. The East Tennessee and Western North Carolina Railroad ("Tweetsie") passed through the community from 1916 until 1940, when a major flood washed away the tracks. The old rail route later became NC 105 in 1956.

== Geography ==
Linville is located in eastern Avery County in the Blue Ridge Mountains. The community is surrounded on all sides by mountains, these are: Grandmother Mountain (East), Flat Rock (Southeast), Pixie Mountain (West), Moore Mountain (Northwest), Brier Knob (North) and Grandfather Mountain (Northeast). Located east of the Eastern Continental Divide, most water drains into the Linville River, which traverses through the area, or either to Lake Kawahna (south) or Grandmother Lake (east).

== Attractions ==
Linville has four country clubs in the area: Grandfather Golf and Country Club, Linville Land Harbor Golf Club, Linville Golf Club and Linville Ridge; all open late spring to early fall. Adjacent to Linville is Grandfather Mountain, best known for its mile-high swinging bridge, and the Blue Ridge Parkway. The Linville Historic District, located between Hickory Lane and Mitchell Avenue, features various buildings built between 1892 and 1940.

== Demographics ==
Historical population
Census	Pop.	Note	%±
2020	283		—
U.S. Decennial Census; 2020

=== 2020 census ===
Linville CDP, North Carolina – Demographic Profile (NH = Non-Hispanic)
Race / Ethnicity	Pop 2020	% 2020
White alone (NH)	260	97.87%
Black or African American alone (NH)	0	0.00%
Native American or Alaska Native alone (NH)	1	0.35%
Asian alone (NH)	2	0.71%
Pacific Islander alone (NH)	0	0.00%
Some Other Race alone (NH)	0	0.00%
Mixed Race/Multi-Racial (NH)	8	2.83%
Hispanic or Latino (any race)	12	4.24%
Total	283	100.00%

Note: the US Census treats Hispanic/Latino as an ethnic category. This table excludes Latinos from the racial categories and assigns them to a separate category. Hispanics/Latinos can be of any race.

== Health care ==
Linville has one hospital, Charles A. Cannon, Jr. Memorial Hospital, that serves all of Avery County.

== Notable person ==
- Hugh Morton, a photographer and nature conservationist who developed Grandfather Mountain
