= Eaglenest Mountain =

Mountain in North Carolina, United States

- Location within North Carolina

Highest point
- Elevation: 4,924 ft (1,501 m)
- Coordinates: 35°29′46″N 83°02′35″W

Geography
- Location: Haywood County, North Carolina, U.S.
- Parent range: Appalachian Mountains

Eaglenest Mountain (also known as Eagles Nest Mountain) is a mountain located 2 miles south of Maggie Valley, North Carolina in Haywood County. It is part of the Plott Balsams, a range of the Appalachian Mountains, and less than a mile south of North Eaglenest Mountain, a higher mountain which used to be called Mount Junaluska and is the highest mountain overlooking Lake Junaluska from the southwest. The closest town that is accessible by road is Hazelwood. Hazelwood was absorbed into the larger incorporated Town of Waynesville in 1995.

In 1900, S. C. Satterthwaite of Waynesville, North Carolina, which was 5 miles away, built the Eagle Nest Hotel at an elevation of 5050 feet. The location was a mountain range he called The Junaluskas, on what is now called North Eaglenest Mountain. The hotel was destroyed by a fire of undetermined origin on April 22, 1918.
