= Waterrock Knob =

Mountain in North Carolina, United States

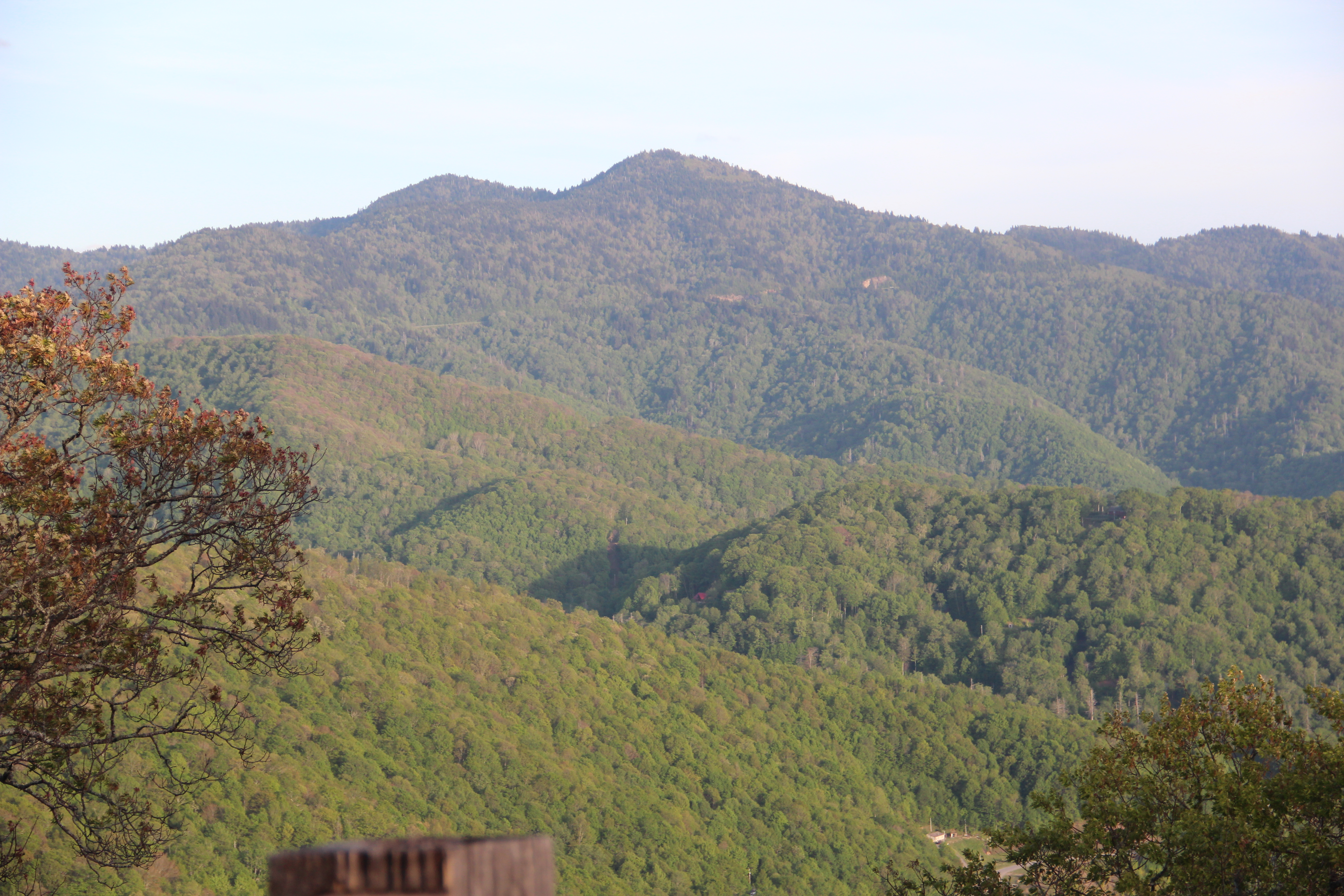
- Waterrock Knob viewed from the Blue Ridge Parkway

Highest point
- Elevation: 6,292 ft (1,918 m)
- Prominence: 1,947 ft (593 m)
- Coordinates: 35.464268°N 83.137643°W

Geography
- Location: Haywood / Jackson Counties, North Carolina, U.S.
- Parent range: Plott Balsams; Blue Ridge Mountains
- Topo map: USGS Sylva North

Climbing
- Easiest route: Hike

Waterrock Knob is a mountain peak in the U.S. state of North Carolina. It is the highest peak in the Plott Balsams and is the 16th-highest mountain in the Eastern United States.

The mountain is a popular destination with tourists and amateur hikers, as it is easily accessible from the Blue Ridge Parkway. A visitors' center is located near its summit and a hiking trail leads to its top. The hiking trail and visitors' center are staffed and maintained by the National Park Service, part of the United States Department of the Interior.

== Name ==
Waterrock Knob is named as such because of a spring located near the summit where hunters would refill their canteens.

== Geography ==
With an elevation of 6,292 feet (1,918 m), Waterrock Knob is the highest peak in the Plott Balsams and is the 13th-highest mountain in the Eastern United States if using a 160 feet (49 m) prominence rule.

The mountain is split by both Haywood and Jackson counties in the western mountains of North Carolina. The mountain's summit is located within the Blue Ridge Parkway National Park Service unit. Cherokee is located about 10 miles (16 km) to the west, while Richland Balsam is located about 10 miles (16 km) to the southeast.

== Hiking ==
Waterrock Knob's summit can be accessed from the Waterrock Knob Visitor Center, located a milepost 451.2 on the Blue Ridge Parkway. This 0.6 miles (0.97 km) long trail ascends over 400 feet (120 m) from visitor center's parking lot and is paved for the first quarter mile.

== Images ==
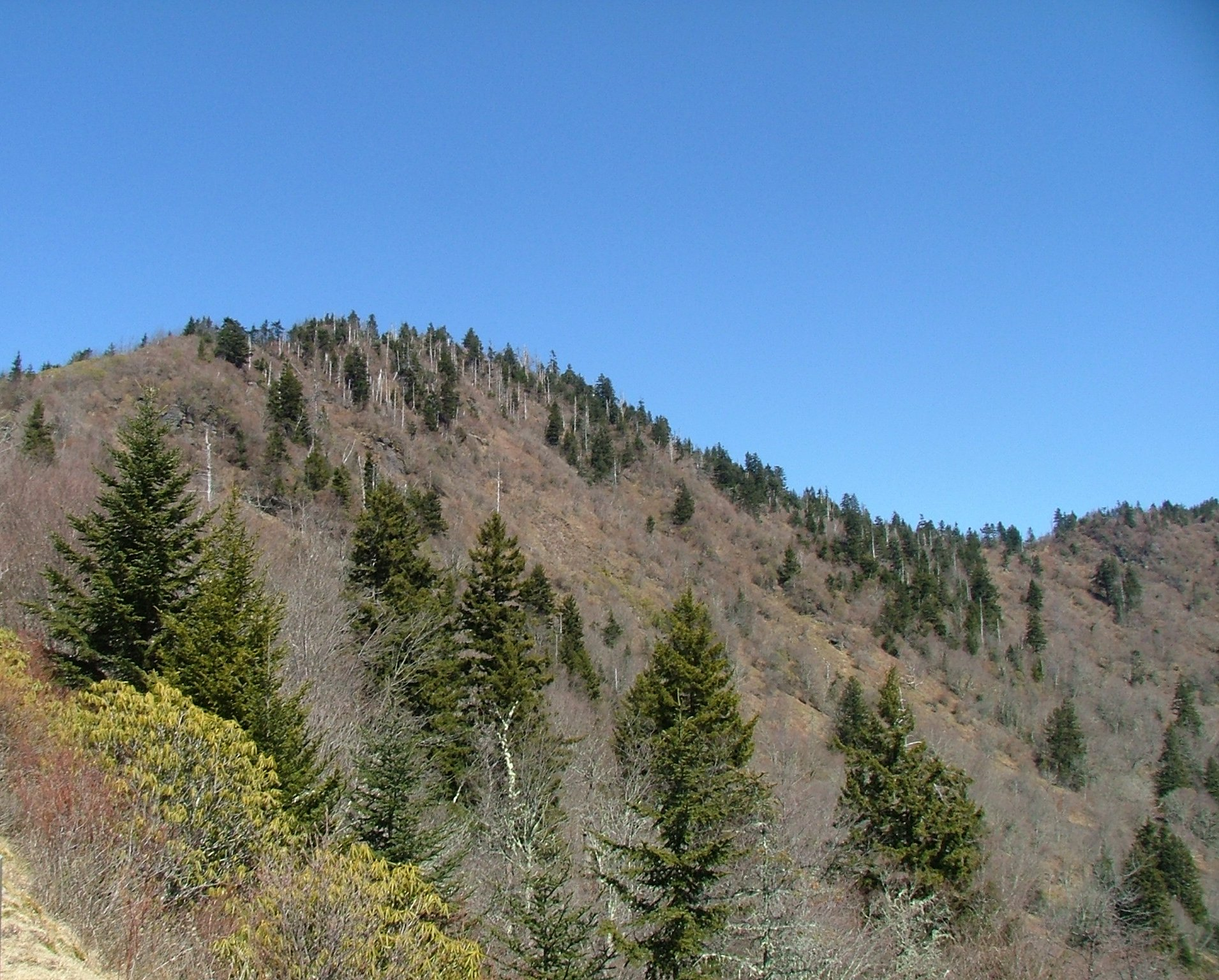
From the visitor center parking lot

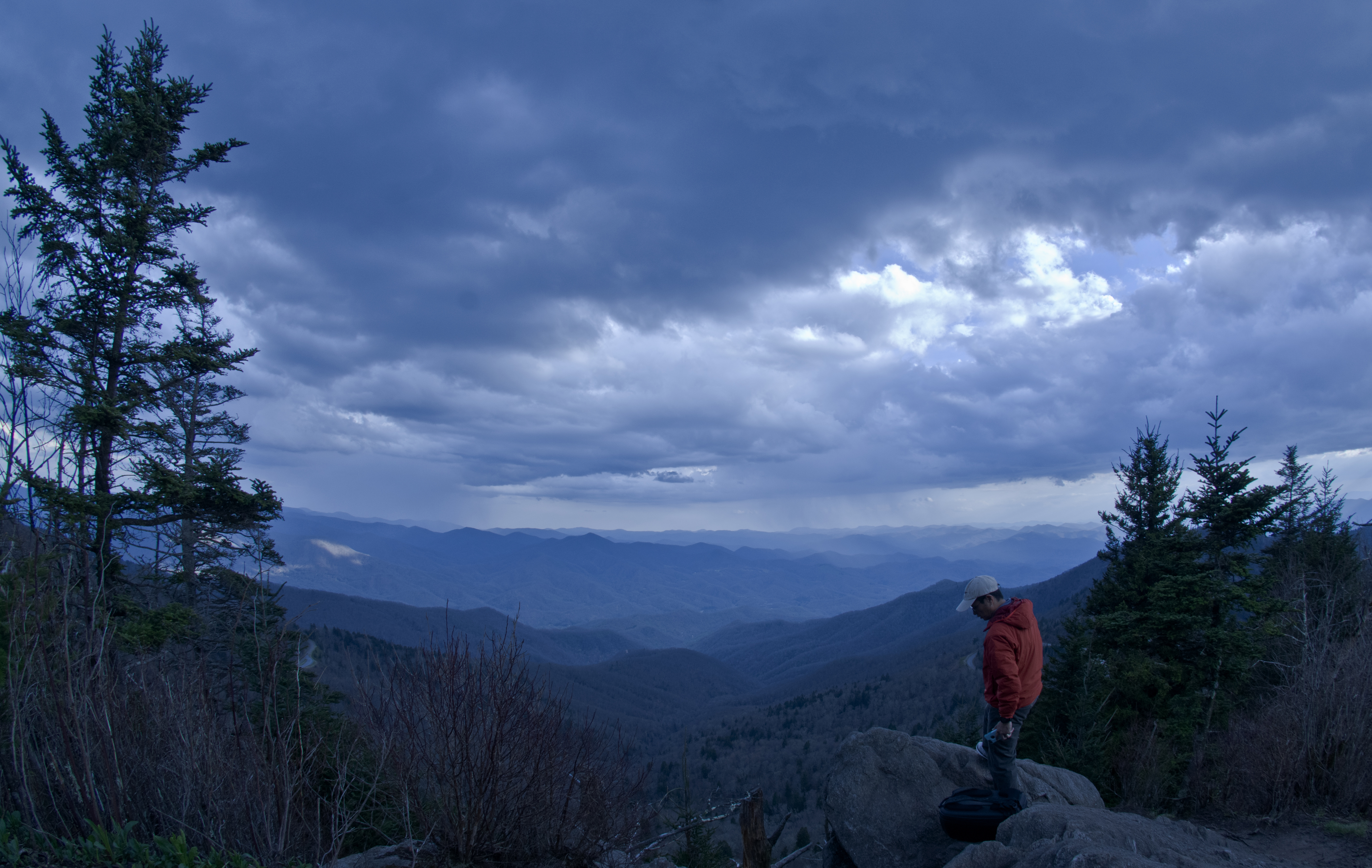
Taken from the summit of Waterrock Knob

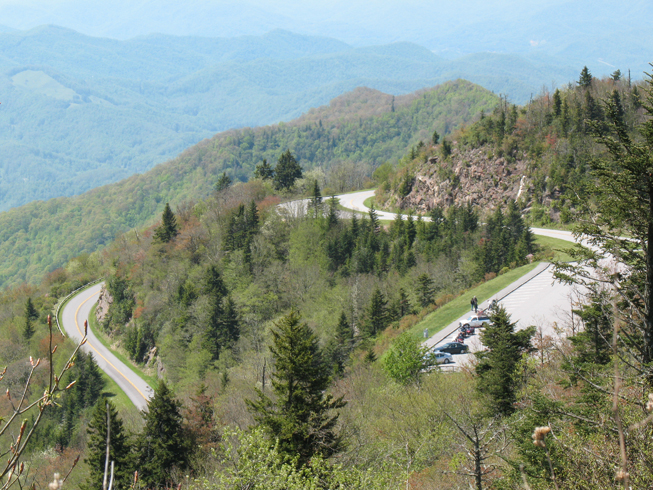
View of the Waterrock Knob parking lot and the Blue Ridge Parkway from the summit of Waterrock Knob

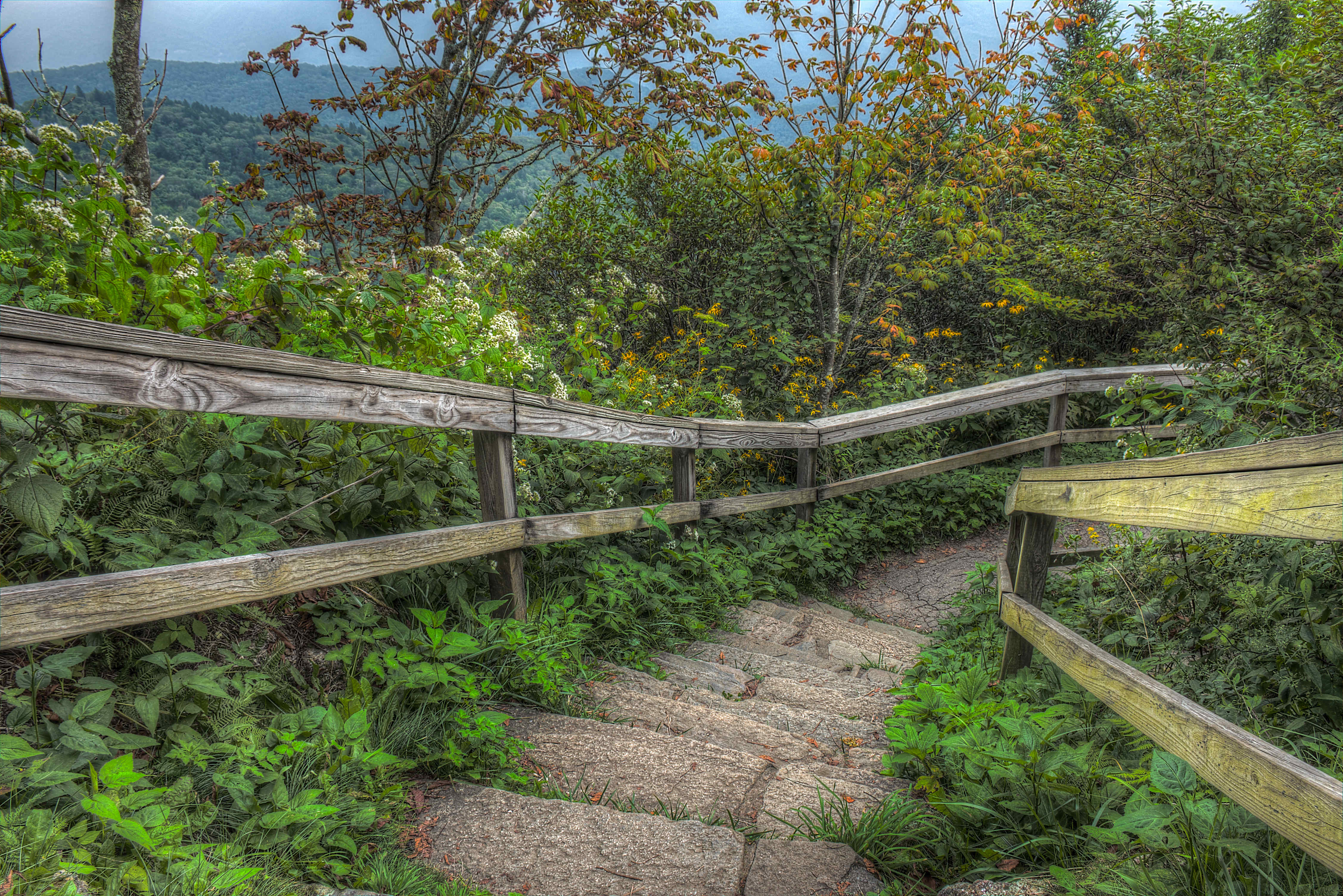
Waterrock Knob Trail

== See also ==
- List of mountains in North Carolina
