= Bee Mountain (North Carolina) =

Mountain in America

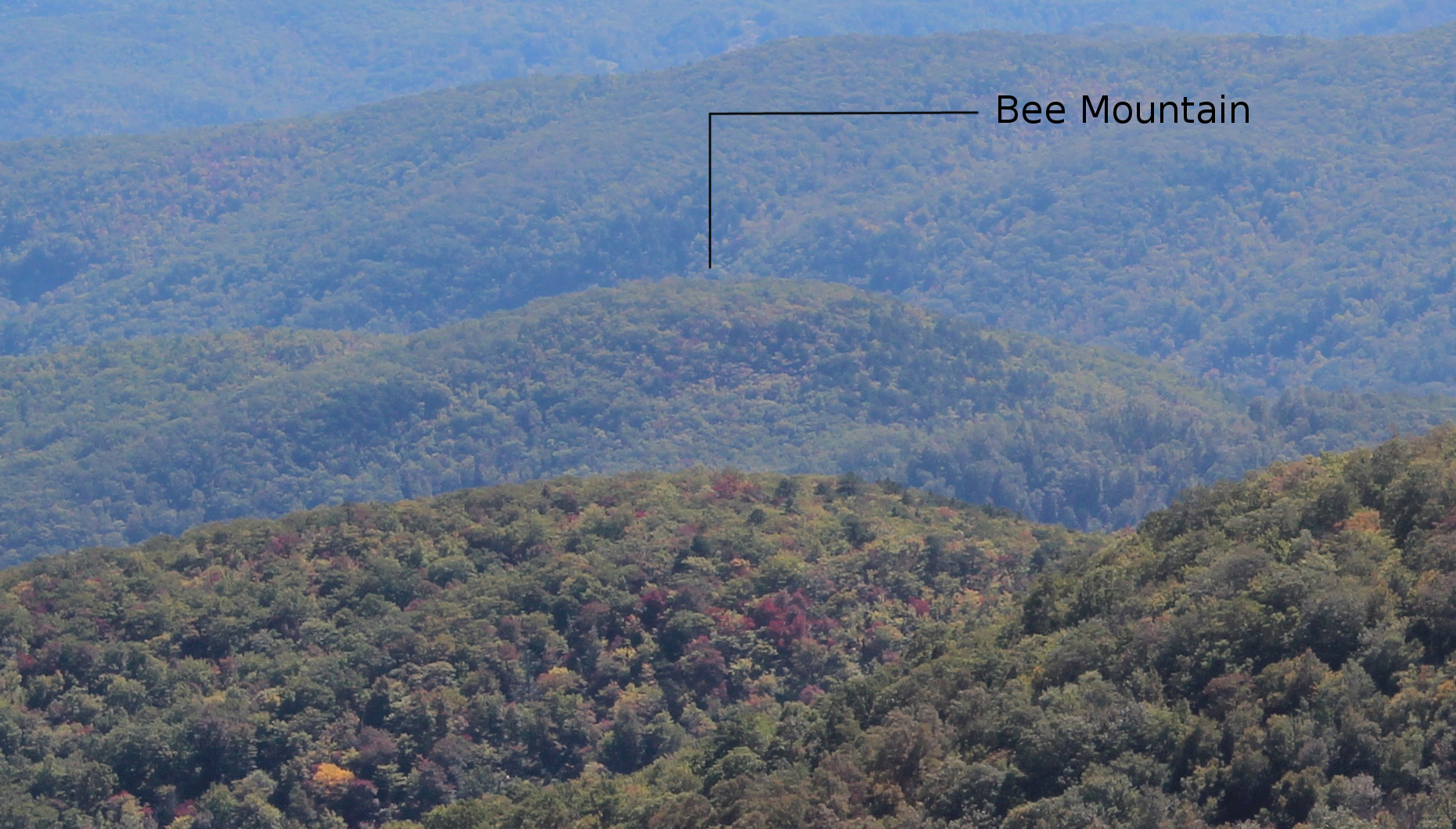
- Bee Mountain viewed from Beacon Heights

Highest point
- Elevation: 2,946 ft (898 m)
- Coordinates: 36°01′50″N 81°49′23″W

Geography
- Location within North Carolina Location within the United States
- Location: Avery County, North Carolina, U.S.
- Parent range: Blue Ridge Mountains
- Topo map: USGS Grandfather Mountain

Bee Mountain is a mountain in the North Carolina High Country and is wholly in the Pisgah National Forest. Its elevation reaches 2,946 feet (898 m). The mountain generates feeder streams for the Catawba River.

It is one of the more isolated mountains in North Carolina, with only one road (Roseboro Road/SR1511) that remotely goes near it.

== See also ==
- List of mountains in North Carolina
