= Grandmother Mountain (North Carolina) =

Mountain in North Carolina, United States

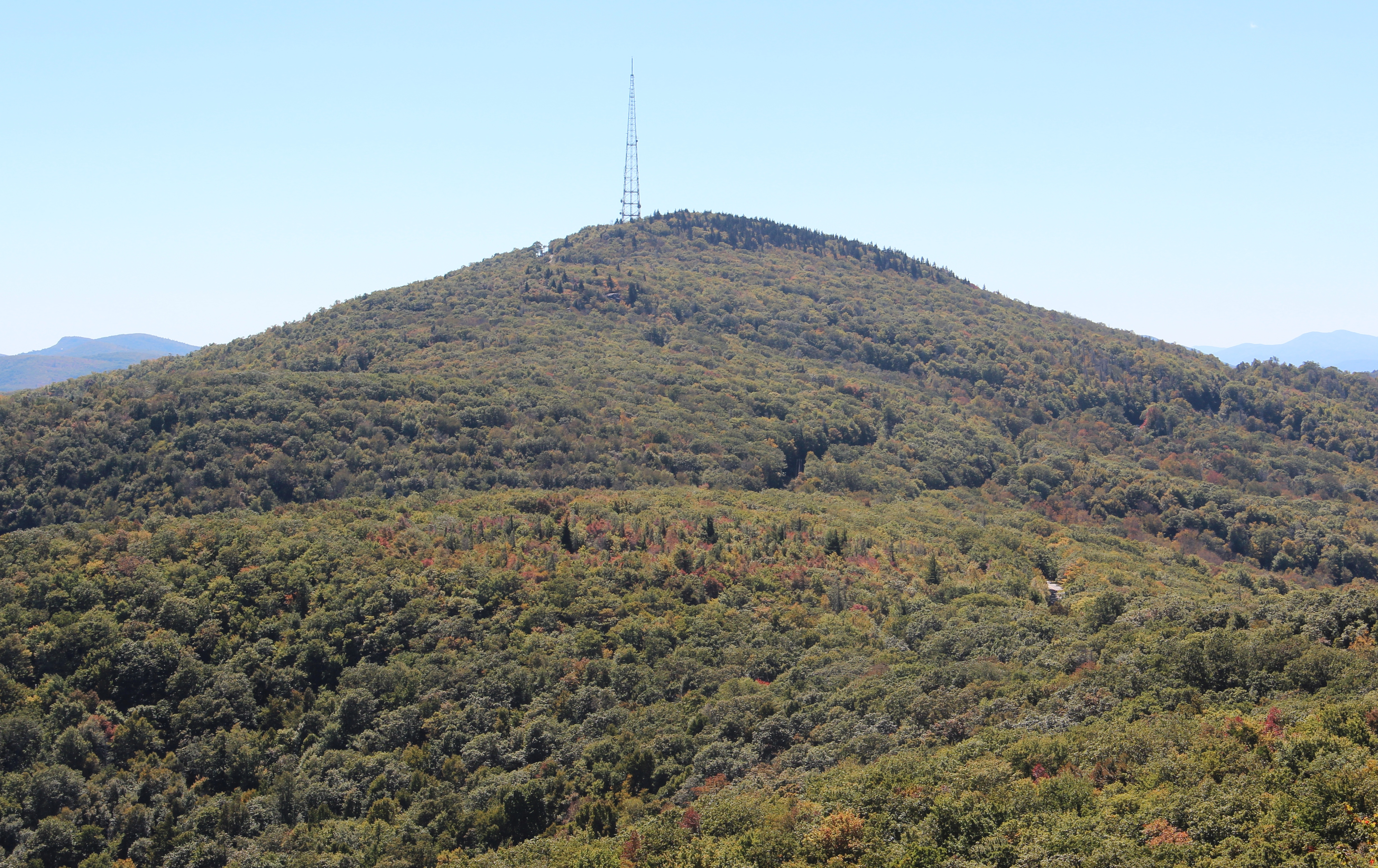
- Grandmother Mountain, from Beacon Heights

Highest point
- Elevation: 4,603 ft (1,403 m)
- Prominence: 240 ft (73 m)
- Coordinates: 36°03′35″N 81°50′33″W

Geography
- Location within North Carolina Location within the United States
- Location: Avery County, North Carolina, U.S.
- Parent range: Blue Ridge Mountains
- Topo map: USGS Grandfather Mountain

Grandmother Mountain is a mountain in the North Carolina High Country, near the community of Linville. It is wholly in the Pisgah National Forest and next to the Blue Ridge Parkway. Its elevation reaches 4,603 feet (1,403 m). The mountain generates feeder streams for the Linville River.

On top of Grandmother Mountain is the WUNE-TV tower, broadcasting PBS North Carolina (PBS NC) on channel 17 (RF 36).

== Wilkes County ==
There is also a Grandmother Mountain in Wilkes County, North Carolina with an elevation of 3,379 ft (1,030 m).

== See also ==
- List of mountains in North Carolina
