= North Eaglenest Mountain =

Mountain in North Carolina, United States

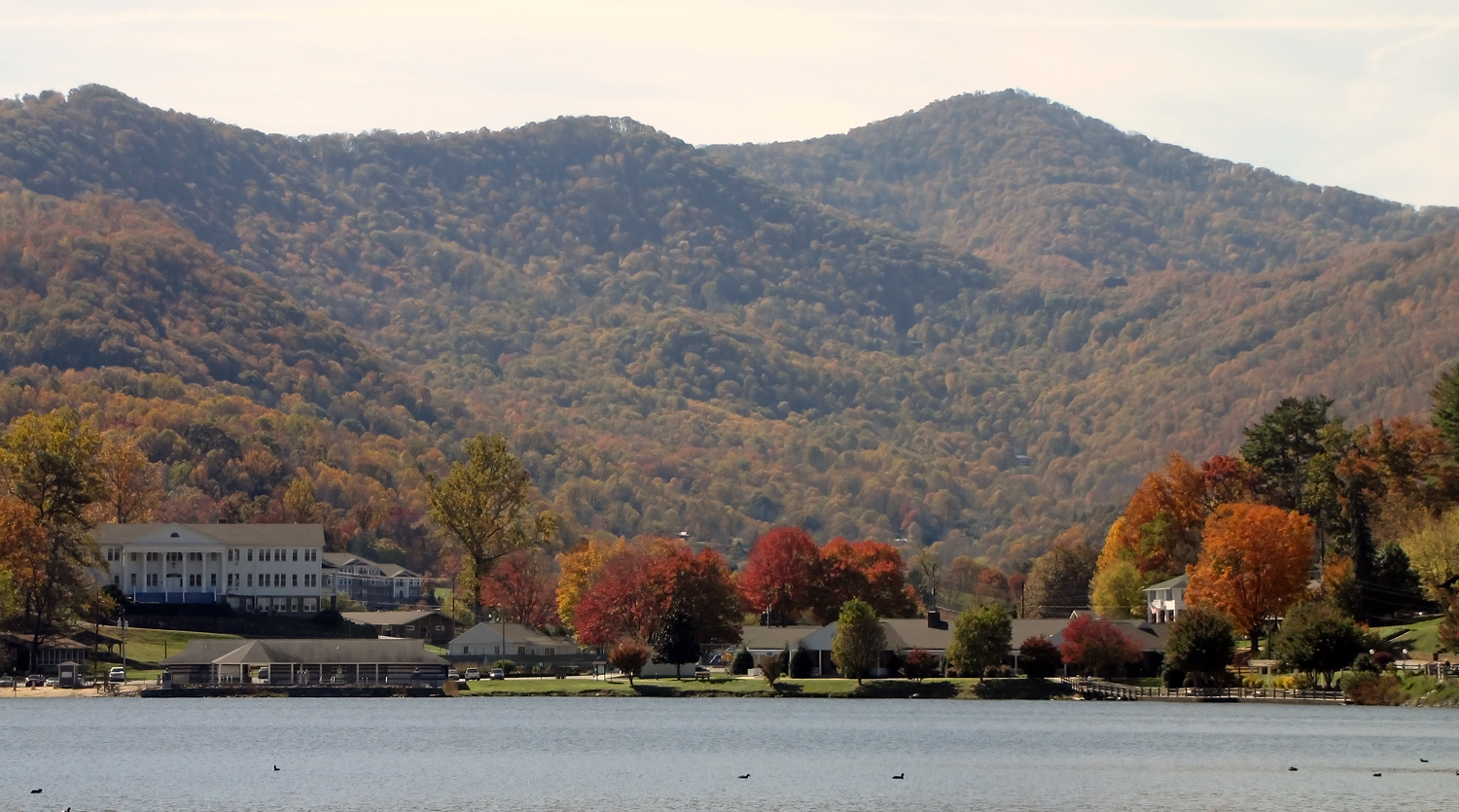

Highest point
- Elevation: 5,071 ft (1,546 m)
- Coordinates: 35°30′02″N 83°02′30″W

Geography
- Location within North Carolina
- Location: Haywood County, North Carolina, U.S.
- Parent range: Appalachian Mountains

North Eaglenest Mountain is a mountain located less than 2 miles (3.2 km) south of Maggie Valley, North Carolina, US, in Haywood County. It is part of the Plott Balsams, a range of the Appalachian Mountains, and less than a mile north of Eaglenest Mountain. It used to be called Mount Junaluska and is the highest mountain overlooking Lake Junaluska from the west.

In 1900, S. C. Satterthwait of Waynesville, North Carolina, which was 5 miles (8.0 km) away, built the Eagle Nest Hotel at an elevation of 5,050 feet (1,540 m). The location was a mountain range he called The Junaluskas, on a peak called Mount Junaluska. The hotel was one of the two hay fever resorts in western North Carolina, the other being Cloudland on Roan Mountain, and it had room for 100 guests (although tents could be used if the hotel filled up) and a view of Plott Balsam. "[A] good wagon road" reached the top of the mountain. The hotel was destroyed by a fire of undetermined origin on April 22, 1918. There was talk of rebuilding but it never happened. A road that was built in 1898, some say by Cherokee, was not used by cars for 20 years. In 1937, H.G. Stone and H.L. Liner took over the road, improved it and began charging tolls to "Scenic Eagle’s Nest Road". This lasted only until 1941. Houses were built on the former Satterwait Estate, and Steve and Sue Foreman have a house where the hotel once stood.
