= Max Patch =

Mountain in North Carolina and Tennessee

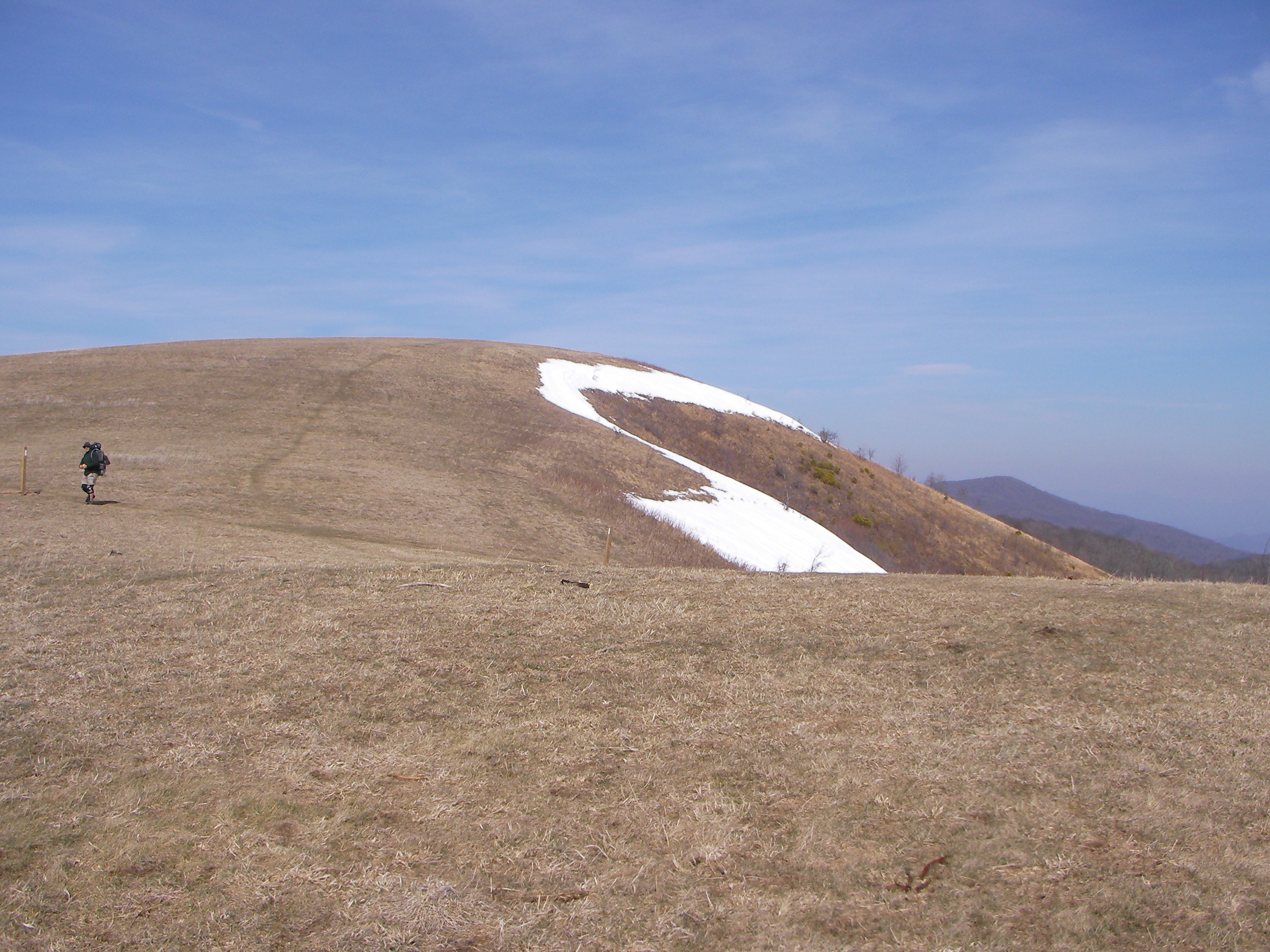
- Max Patch Bald

Highest point
- Elevation: 4,626 ft (1,410 m)
- Prominence: 866 ft (264 m)
- Coordinates: 35°47′49″N 82°57′25″W

Geography
- Location within North Carolina
- Location: Madison County, North Carolina, U.S.
- Parent range: Bald Mountains
- Topo map: USGS Lemon Gap

Max Patch is a bald mountain on the North Carolina-Tennessee Border in Madison County, North Carolina, and Cocke County, Tennessee. It is a major landmark along the Tennessee/North Carolina section of the Appalachian Trail, although its summit is in North Carolina. It is known for its 360-degree views of the surrounding mountains, namely the Bald Mountains in the immediate vicinity; the Unakas to the north; the Great Smoky Mountains National Park to the south; and the Great Balsams and Black Mountains to the southeast. A small parking area is near the summit with a short loop trail. No public bathrooms or trash cans exist, and parking is limited at the site.

== History ==
Max Patch was originally cleared in the early 19th century by farmers seeking to use the area as pasture for cattle and sheep. Throughout the first half of the 20th century, the mountain was used for a wide range of purposes including the site of an inn, a hostel circuit, and an airstrip before the United States Forest Service purchased the area in 1982 to preserve the historic site and prevent the construction of a ski resort. The Carolina Mountain Club, Appalachian Trail Conservancy, and United States Forest Service worked collaboratively to relocate the Appalachian Trail to Max Patch's summit and completed the project in 1984.

== Ecology ==
In addition to being a popular tourist destination, Max Patch is home to various native plants and wildlife. The mountain is managed by the United States Forest Service to maintain its early ecological succession stage, preserving habitat for local flora and fauna in addition to the famed panoramic views. The Carolina Mountain Club, United States Fish and Wildlife Service, and Appalachian Trail Conservancy also work to help restore and manage the area's ecosystem. American black bears, bobcats, and elk have been spotted at Max Patch. The area is also a designated Important Bird Area through Birdlife International and a critical site for the imperiled golden-winged warbler and an assortment of other bird species. In addition, Max Patch is an important stopover point for monarch butterfly populations.

== Tourism and Conservation ==
Due to widespread ecological damage and human health hazards stemming from overuse and irresponsible visitor stewardship, the United States Forest Service issued a closure order to help the area recover in July 2021. The order includes a ban on overnight camping, fires, and group sizes of more than ten. The complete closure order is listed below. Visitors are encouraged to leave no trace and always stay on the trail to prevent the creation of harmful social trails which damage habitat through erosion and fragmentation.

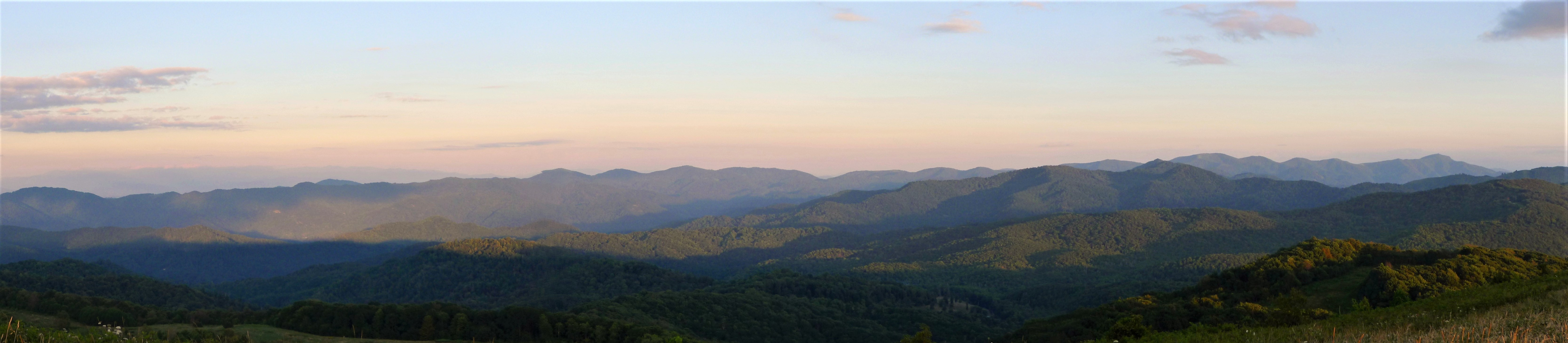
Panorama taken from Max Patch 2013
