= Rich Mountain (Watauga County, North Carolina) =

Mountain in North Carolina, United States

- Location within North Carolina

Highest point
- Elevation: 4,748 ft (1,447 m)
- Coordinates: 36°14′08″N 81°42′21″W

Geography
- Location: Watauga County, North Carolina, U.S.
- Parent range: Blue Ridge Mountains
- Topo map: USGS Boone

Rich Mountain is a mountain located in the North Carolina High Country, roughly 3 miles (4.8 km) northwest of the town of Boone. Its elevation reaches 4,748 feet (1,447 m).

The mountain is sometimes confused with Howard Knob, which is to its immediate east; sharing the same ridge to the west is Snakeden Mountain. The summit is private property.

The summit of Rich Mountain has year-round temperatures similar to nearby Beech Mountain. While Beech Mountain stands 800 feet (240 m) taller, the unique environment and prevailing winds that channel through a valley just to the North of Rich, bring winter lows that compete with and are occasionally lower than Beech. The summit, and upper north face of Rich Mountain will also receive 50-90% more snow each winter than Boone. 68" of snow was recorded during the 2017/2018 winter which sported 3 different snowfalls through the end of April.

The mountain generates several feeder streams to the South Fork New River (via Doe Fork) and the Watauga River (via Laurel Fork).
