= Brier Knob (Avery County, North Carolina) =

Mountain in North Carolina, United States

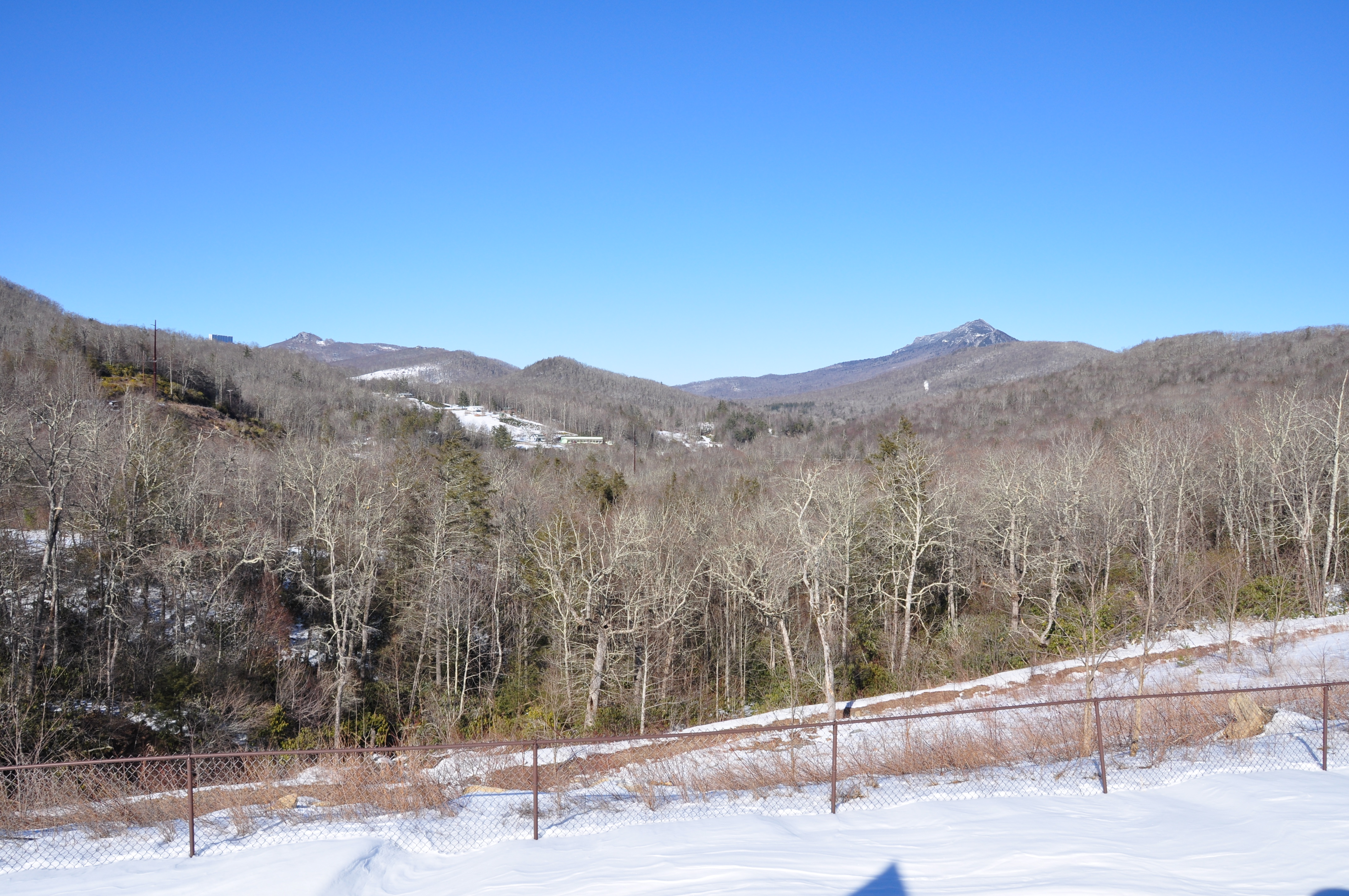
- Brier Knob (center), also Sugar Mountain and Flattop Mountain on left, Grandfather Mountain and Pixie Mountain on right.

Highest point
- Elevation: 4,085 ft (1,245 m)
- Coordinates: 36°04′52″N 81°52′41″W

Geography
- Location within North Carolina
- Location: Avery County, North Carolina, U.S.
- Parent range: Blue Ridge Mountains
- Topo map: USGS Grandfather Mountain

Brier Knob is a mountain in the North Carolina High Country, at the Linville community. It is wholly in the Pisgah National Forest. Its elevation reaches 4,085 feet (1,245 m). Feeder streams from the mountain flow directly into the Linville River.

Brier Knob is considered the northern limit of Linville, it is flanked by NC 105 to the east and West Fork Road to the west. Unlike other mountains that surround it, there is not development on the summit of Brier Knob.
