= Richland Balsam =

Mountain in North Carolina

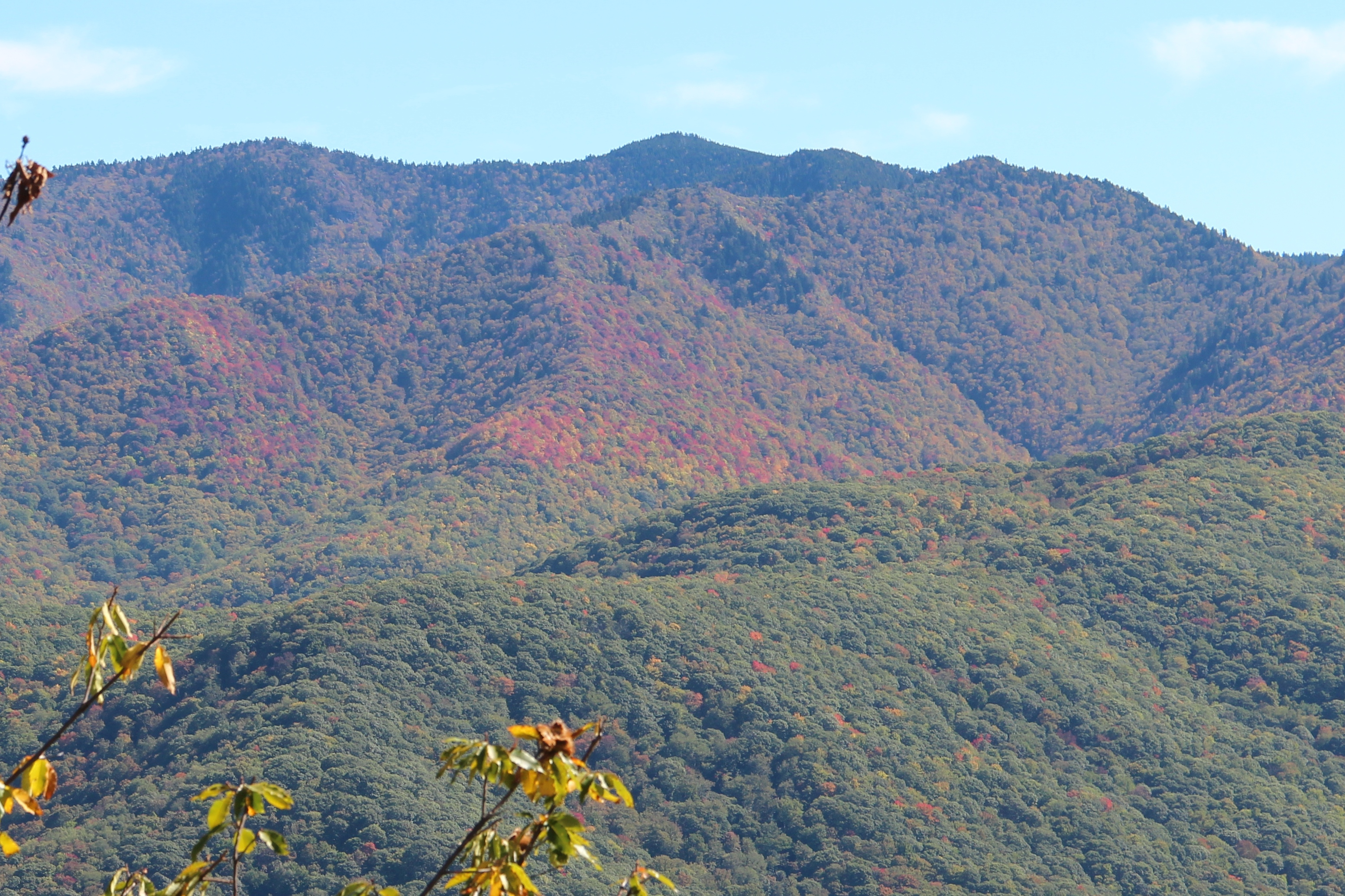
- Richland Balsam viewed from the Steestachee Bald Overlook

Highest point
- Elevation: 6,405 ft (1,952 m)
- Prominence: 3,010 ft (920 m)
- Coordinates: 35°22′02″N 82°59′24″W

Geography
- Location: Haywood / Jackson counties, North Carolina, U.S.
- Parent range: Great Balsam Mountains
- Topo map: USGS Sam Knob

Climbing
- Easiest route: short hiking trail

Richland Balsam is a mountain in the Great Balsam Mountains in the U.S. state of North Carolina. Rising to an elevation of 6,410 feet (1,950 m), it is the highest mountain in the Great Balsam range, is among the 20 highest summits in the Appalachian range, and is the ninth highest peak in the Eastern United States. The Blue Ridge Parkway reaches an elevation of 6,053 feet (1,845 m)—the parkway's highest point—as it passes over Richland Balsam's southwestern slope. The Jackson County-Haywood County line crosses the mountain's summit.

Richland Balsam's upper elevations (above approximately 5,500 feet) support part of one of just ten stands of Southern Appalachian spruce-fir forest. This forest type consists of two dominant tree types—the red spruce and the Fraser fir—commonly called the "he-balsam" and "she-balsam" respectively, although the latter has been decimated in recent decades by the balsam woolly adelgid infestation.

The eastern half of Richland Balsam is protected by the Pisgah National Forest, and most of the western half is protected by the Nantahala National Forest (the exception being the Blue Ridge Parkway corridor, which is maintained by the National Park Service).

== Hiking ==
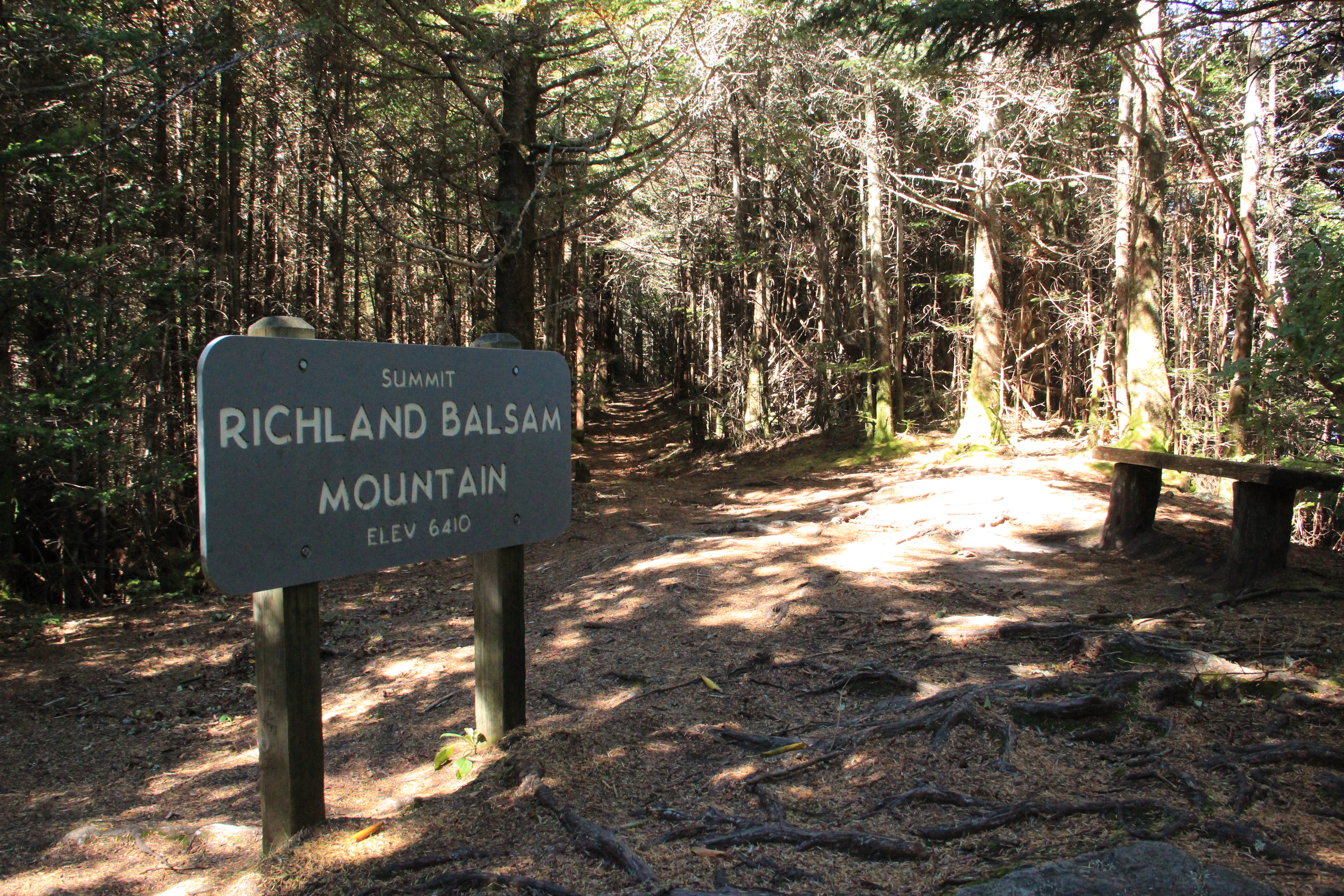
Sign incorrectly marking summit along the hiking trail

There is a low difficulty, 1.5 mile long trail that can be hiked to reach the summit of Richland Balsam, accessible from a parking area off the Blue Ridge Parkway. The trail begins at the north end of the parking lot and about 0.15 miles along the trail there is a fork which allows you to take the loop to the top in either direction with the option to the right offering a quicker, but more challenging route to the top. Both routes take about 45 minutes to complete and involve roughly 700 feet of elevation gain. The highest point of the mountain is slightly east off the trail about 0.8 miles along the trail, but the sign marking the summit is slightly down the trail and technically an incorrect marker of the peak.

The trail is maintained by the Friends of the Blue Ridge Parkway the Balsam Chapter which helps maintain the parkway from mile marker 416 to mile marker 469. While the Friends of the Blue Ridge Parkway has been an organization since 1988, the Balsam Chapter was not founded until November 2020. The Friends of the Blue Ridge Parkway compose of about 750 volunteers and 1,500 paying members.

Due to the winding nature of the roadway and the increased severity of winter weather due to the elevation, the section of the Blue Ridge Parkway that passes over Richland Balsam is frequently closed for long periods during the winter season. The Mountain is only accessible when the Blue Ridge Parkway is open, so the mountain is often inaccessible in winter. The trail and overlook is maintained by the Friends of the Blue Ridge Parkway, a nonprofit mostly composed of residents along the parkway.

== Flora and fauna ==
This forest type consists of two dominant tree types— the red spruce and the Fraser fir— commonly called the "he-balsam" and "she-balsam" respectively, although the latter has been decimated in recent decades by the balsam woolly adelgid infestation. Spruce-fir forests are found in the highest elevations of Southern Appalachia due their ability to survive in climates that are too cold and harsh for the hardwood forests which dominate lower elevations. Southern spruce-fir ecosystems resemble ecosystems more commonly found in the northern United States and Canada than in the Southeastern United States.

There are 121 mammals native and 475 birds native to North Carolina, and the vast majority have historical ranges native to the mountain. Due to the protected lands on either side of the Mountain, seeing birds and mammals is not unusual. While the surrounding protected areas offer better wildlife recreation, the mountain provides a high view of the surrounding wilderness, which can be advantageous for bird or animal watching.

== Camping ==
There is no designated camping areas directly attached to the Haywood-Jackson Overlook. However, camping is permitted in the Pisgah National forest to the east of the mountain and to the west of the mountain in Nantahala National Forest.

== See also ==
- List of mountains in North Carolina
