= Pixie Mountain =

Mountain in North Carolina, United States

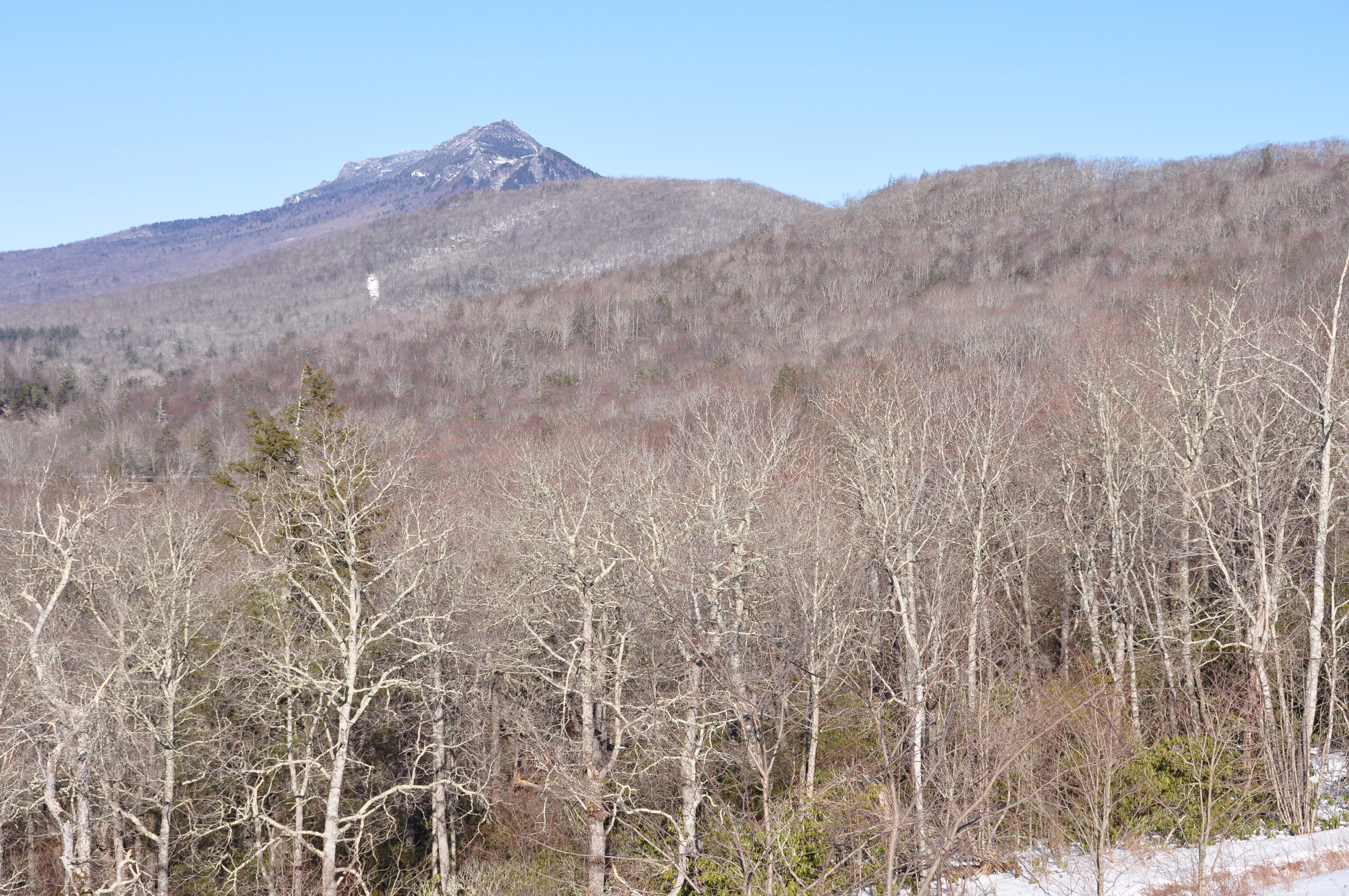
- Grandfather Mountain (left) and Pixie Mountain (right)

Highest point
- Elevation: 4,058 ft (1,237 m)
- Coordinates: 36°03′42″N 81°52′36″W

Geography
- Location within North Carolina
- Location: Avery County, North Carolina, U.S.
- Parent range: Blue Ridge Mountains
- Topo map: USGS Newland

Pixie Mountain is a mountain in the North Carolina High Country, in the community of Linville. Its elevation reaches 4,058 feet (1,237 m). The mountain is adjacent to the Linville River.

The Linville Bypass (NC 181) goes around Pixie Mountain on its western side; while the majority of the Linville community is on its East and North.
