= Three Top Mountain (North Carolina) =

Mountain in North Carolina, United States

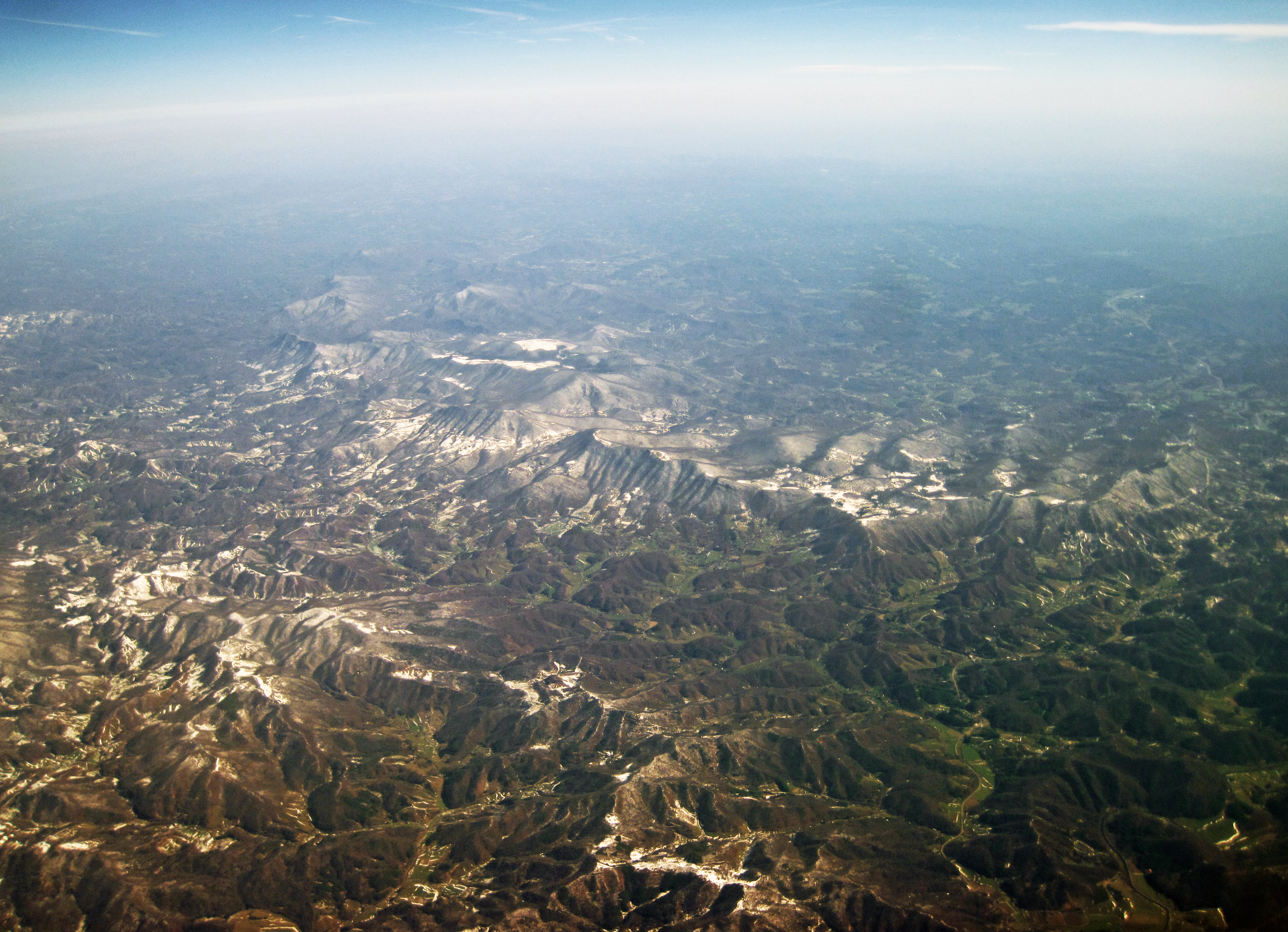

Highest point
- Elevation: 5,020 ft (1,530 m)
- Prominence: 1,269 feet (387 m)
- Coordinates: 36°25′33″N 81°34′43″W

Geography
- Location within North Carolina
- Location: Ashe County, North Carolina, U.S.
- Parent range: Blue Ridge Mountains
- Topo map: USGS Warrensville

Three Top Mountain (variant names: Three Tops) is a mountain in the North Carolina High Country, located west of the town of West Jefferson. Its elevation reaches 5,020 feet (1,530 m) at its highest peak, unofficially named "Big Rock." Three Top also has ten other sub-peaks of varying height.

The mountain generates feeder streams to the North Fork New River.
