= Chestnut Mountain (Transylvania County, North Carolina) =

Mountain in North Carolina, United States

Highest point
- Elevation: 3,012 ft (918 m)
- Coordinates: 35°09′58″N 82°42′57″W

Geography
- Location: Transylvania County, North Carolina, U.S.
- Parent range: Great Balsam Mountains; Blue Ridge Mountains
- Topo map: USGS Brevard

Chestnut Mountain is a mountain near the city of Brevard, North Carolina. It reaches an elevation of 3,012 feet (918 m). The mountain generates feeder streams for the French Broad River.
