= Brown Mountain (North Carolina) =

Ridge in North Carolina, United States

Brown Mountain Ridge
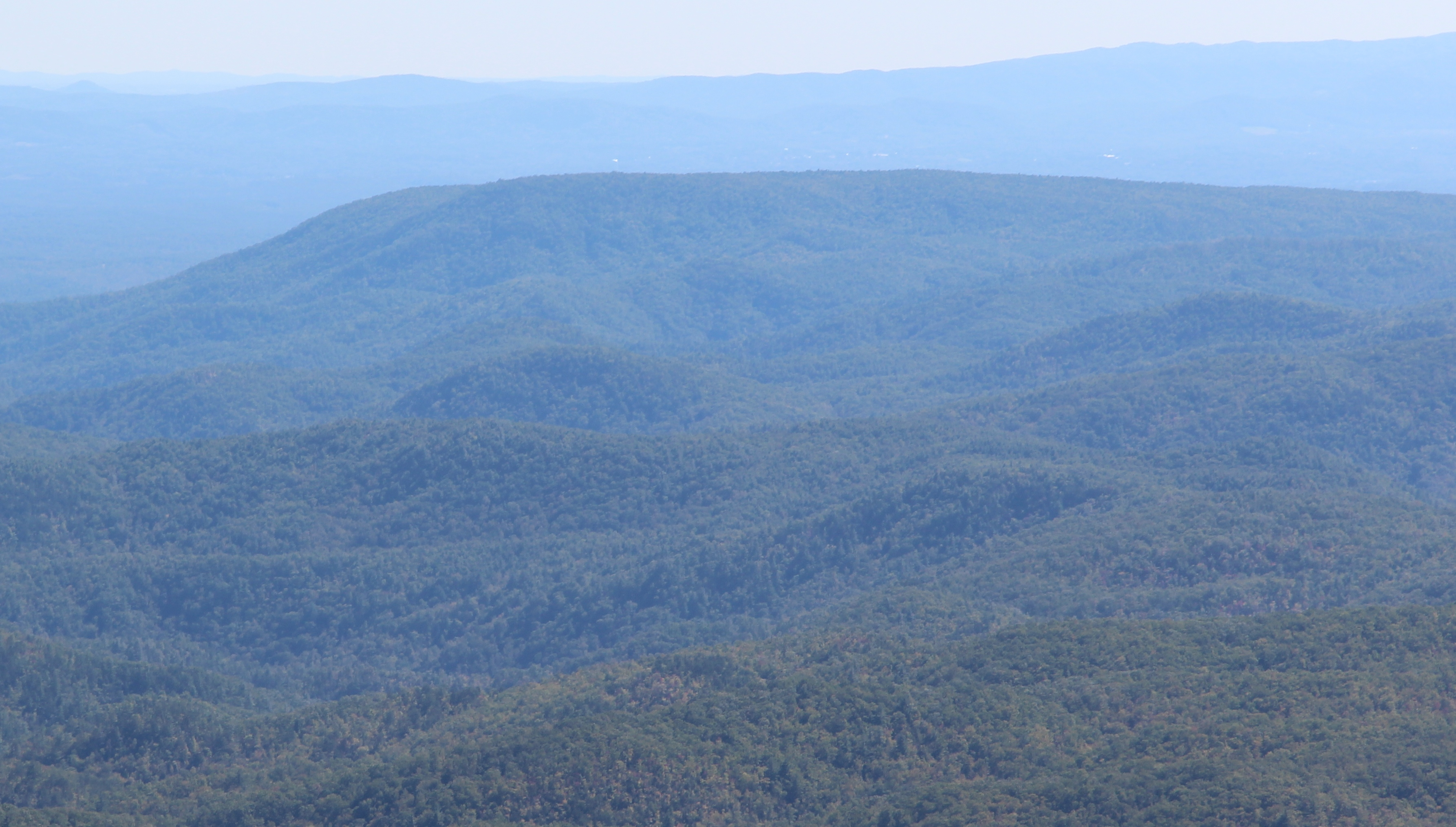
- Brown Mountain viewed from Beacon Heights

Highest point
- Elevation: 2,283 ft (696 m)
- Coordinates: 35°54′57″N 81°44′45″W

Geography
- Location: Burke / Caldwell counties, North Carolina, U.S.
- Parent range: Blue Ridge Mountains
- Topo map: USGS Collettsville

Brown Mountain is a low-lying ridge, approximately 1.5 miles (2.4 km) long, in the Pisgah National Forest near Morganton, in western North Carolina, on the border of Burke and Caldwell Counties.

Since at least the early 20th century, mysterious illuminations known as the Brown Mountain lights have been seen there.

== See also ==
- List of mountains in North Carolina
