= Chestnut Mountain (Caldwell County, North Carolina) =

Mountain in North Carolina, United States

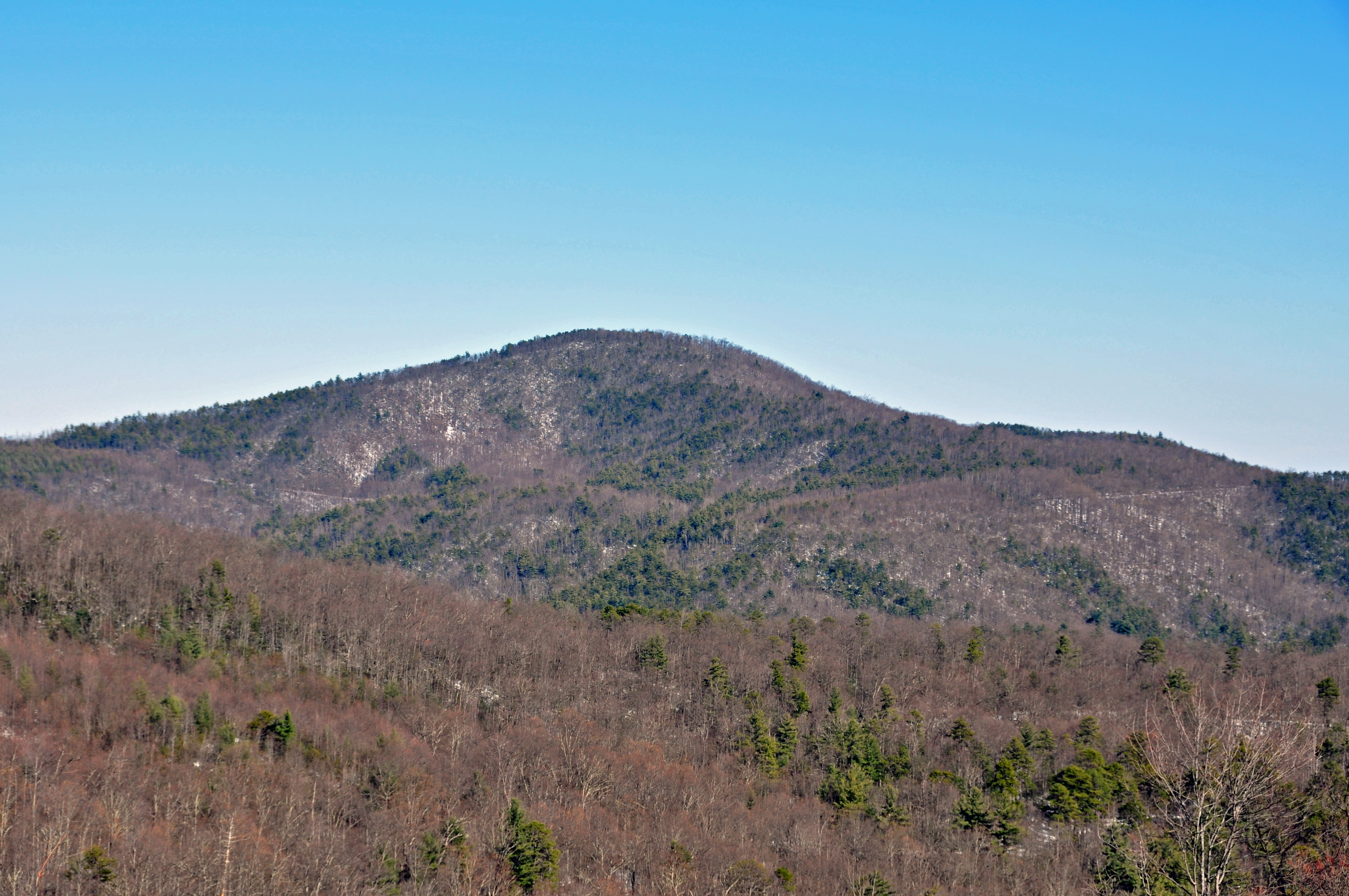
- Chestnut Mountain

Highest point
- Elevation: 3,314 ft (1,010 m)
- Coordinates: 35°57′42″N 81°48′25″W

Geography
- Location: Avery / Burke / Caldwell counties, North Carolina, U.S.
- Parent range: Blue Ridge Mountains
- Topo map: USGS Chestnut Mountain

Chestnut Mountain is a mountain in the North Carolina High Country and wholly in the Pisgah National Forest. Its elevation reaches 3,314 feet (1,010 m) and it also marks the corner between Avery, Burke, and Caldwell counties. The mountain generates feeder streams for the Catawba River.
