= Plott Balsams =

Mountain range in North Carolina, United States

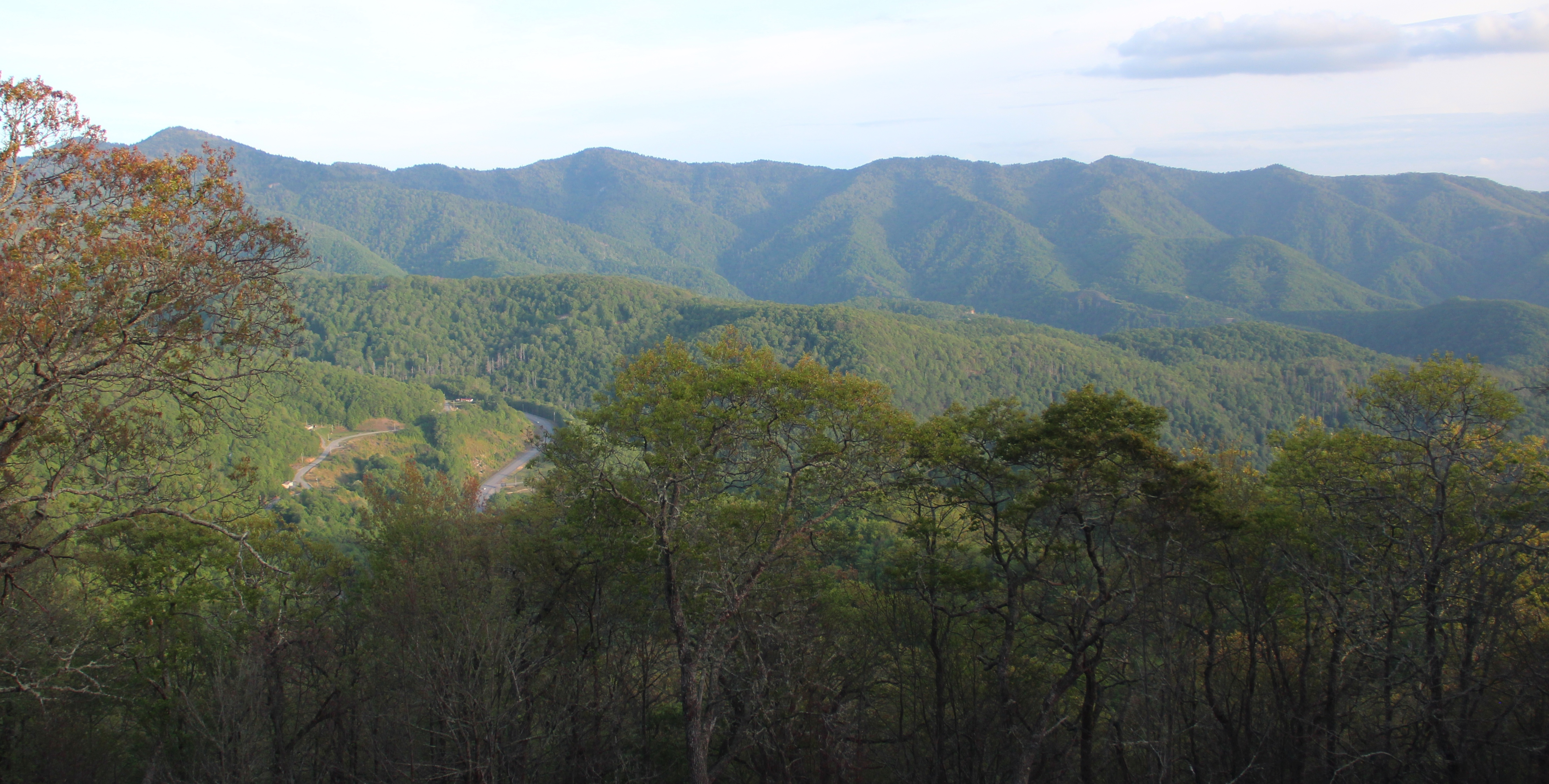
- The Plott Balsams viewed from the Blue Ridge Parkway

Highest point
- Peak: Waterrock Knob
- Elevation: 6,292 ft (1,918 m)

Geography
- Country: United States
- State: North Carolina
- Range coordinates: 35°26′53″N 83°09′29″W
- Parent range: Blue Ridge Mountains
- Borders on: Great Smoky Mountains; Great Balsam Mountains

The Plott Balsams are a mountain range in western North Carolina in the southeastern United States.

== Description ==
The Plott Balsams are part of the Blue Ridge Mountain Province of the southern Appalachian Mountains. The Plott Balsams stretch from Sylva in the Tuckasegee River valley to the southwest to Maggie Valley in the northeast. The Great Smoky Mountains border the Plott Balsams to the north, and the Great Balsam Mountains border the range to the south. The range comprises parts of Jackson County and Haywood County. The Nantahala National Forest protects much of the south side of the Plott Balsams. The Qualla Boundary, which is the reserve of the Eastern Band of Cherokee Indians, includes parts of the range's northwest section along Soco Creek.

Waterrock Knob, which has an elevation of 6,292 feet (1,918 m), is the highest summit in the Plott Balsams. Four other summits in the range rise above 6,000 feet, namely 6,240-foot (1,900 m) Mount Lyn Lowry, 6,240-foot (1,900 m) Browning Knob, 6,088-foot (1,856 m) Plott Balsam Mountain, and 6,032-foot (1,839 m) Yellow Face. Other notable summits include the Pinnacle, which overlooks the Sylva area to the south, 5,810-foot (1,770 m) Blackrock Mountain (near Yellow Face), and 5,875-foot (1,791 m) Campbell Lick, which overlooks Maggie Valley. A stand of Southern Appalachian spruce–fir forest cover the range's upper elevations.

The Blue Ridge Parkway traverses the slopes of the highest mountains in the Plott Balsams, connecting Soco Gap and Balsam Gap. A short road connects the parkway to an overlook and a National Park Service visitor contact station and bookstore near the summit of Waterrock Knob.

The city of Sylva maintains a municipal park along Fisher Creek in the southeast section of the range. A memorial dedicated to leukemia victim Lyn Lowry, who died in 1962, is situated atop Lowry's namesake mountain. The memorial includes a 60-foot (18 m) cross that is lit up at night, making it visible for miles from the surrounding towns.

The Plott Balsams are named for the Plott family, whose ancestor, (Johannes) George Plott (c. 1733-1815), immigrated to North Carolina in the late 18th century from Germany. The Plott Hound, a breed of hunting dog, is named after the range.

== See also ==
- List of subranges of the Appalachian Mountains
