= Mount Sequoyah =

Mountain in North Carolina, United States

Coordinates: 35.67698°N 83.28203°W

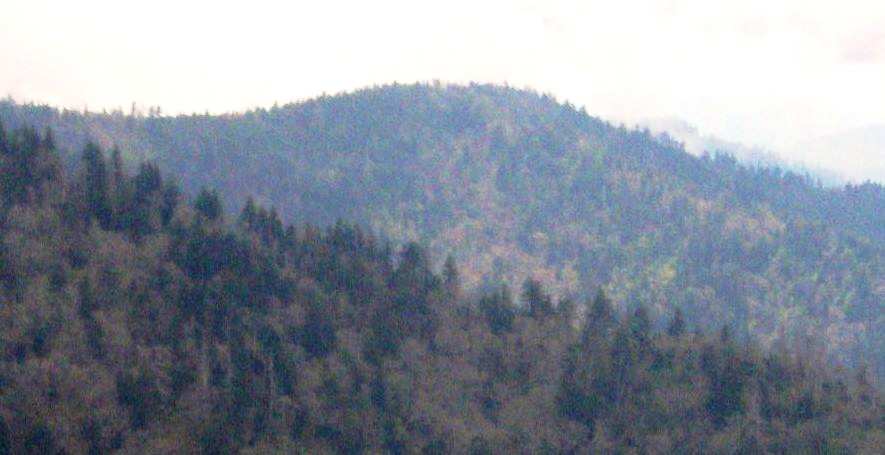
Mount Sequoyah, viewed from Mount Guyot

Mount Sequoyah is a mountain in the Great Smoky Mountains, located in the Southeastern United States. It has an elevation of 6,003 feet (1,830 meters) above sea level. While the Appalachian Trail crosses its summit, Sequoyah is an 11.5-mile (18.5 km) hike from the nearest parking lot, making it one of the most remote places in the Great Smoky Mountains National Park.

The Tennessee-North Carolina border traverses Mount Sequoyah, with Sevier County to the north and Swain County to the south. The mountain consists of four small peaks, with the easternmost being the true (highest) summit. Sequoyah rises approximately 1,500 feet (460 m) above its southern base along Left Fork Creek and approximately 3,500 feet (1,100 m) above its northern base along the Little Pigeon River. Part of the headwaters of the Little Pigeon accumulate along Sequoyah's northern slope.

Mount Sequoyah is named after the inventor of the Cherokee alphabet. While it's doubtful that Sequoyah ever visited the mountain, numerous Cherokee villages dotted the base of the southeastern Smokies when European settlers arrived in the early 18th century. Arnold Guyot crossed Mount Sequoyah on his survey of the Smokies crest in the late 1850s. Guyot referred to the mountain as "The Three Brothers", and measured its elevation at 5,945 feet (1,812 m). The mountain rarely saw a human presence until a segment of the Appalachian Trail was constructed across its summit in 1935.

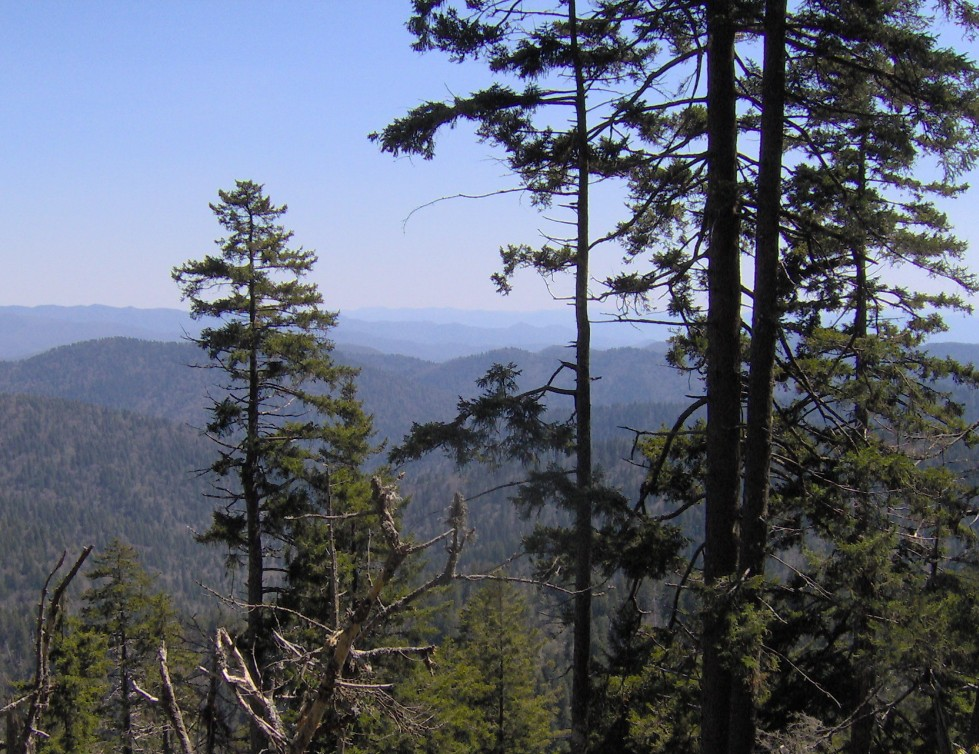
The view looking south from the Appalachian Trail, near the summit of Sequoyah

The summit of Mount Sequoyah is among the most distant summits traversed by a trail in the Great Smokies. Following the Appalachian Trail from Newfound Gap, Mount Sequoyah is 13.1 miles (21.1 km) to the east. From the Cosby Campground, Sequoyah can be reached by following the Snake Den Ridge Trail 5.3 miles (8.5 km) to its junction with the Appalachian Trail, and then following the latter 3.7 miles (6.0 km) to Tricorner Knob, crossing Old Black and Mount Guyot along the way. From Tricorner, Mount Sequoyah is 2.5 miles (4.0 km) to the southwest, just beyond Mount Chapman. The Hughes Ridge Trail, which connects the Appalachian Trail and the Benton MacKaye Trail, terminates just over two miles (3.2 km) southwest of Sequoyah.
