= Mount Chapman =

Mountain in the Great Smoky Mountains, Southeastern United States

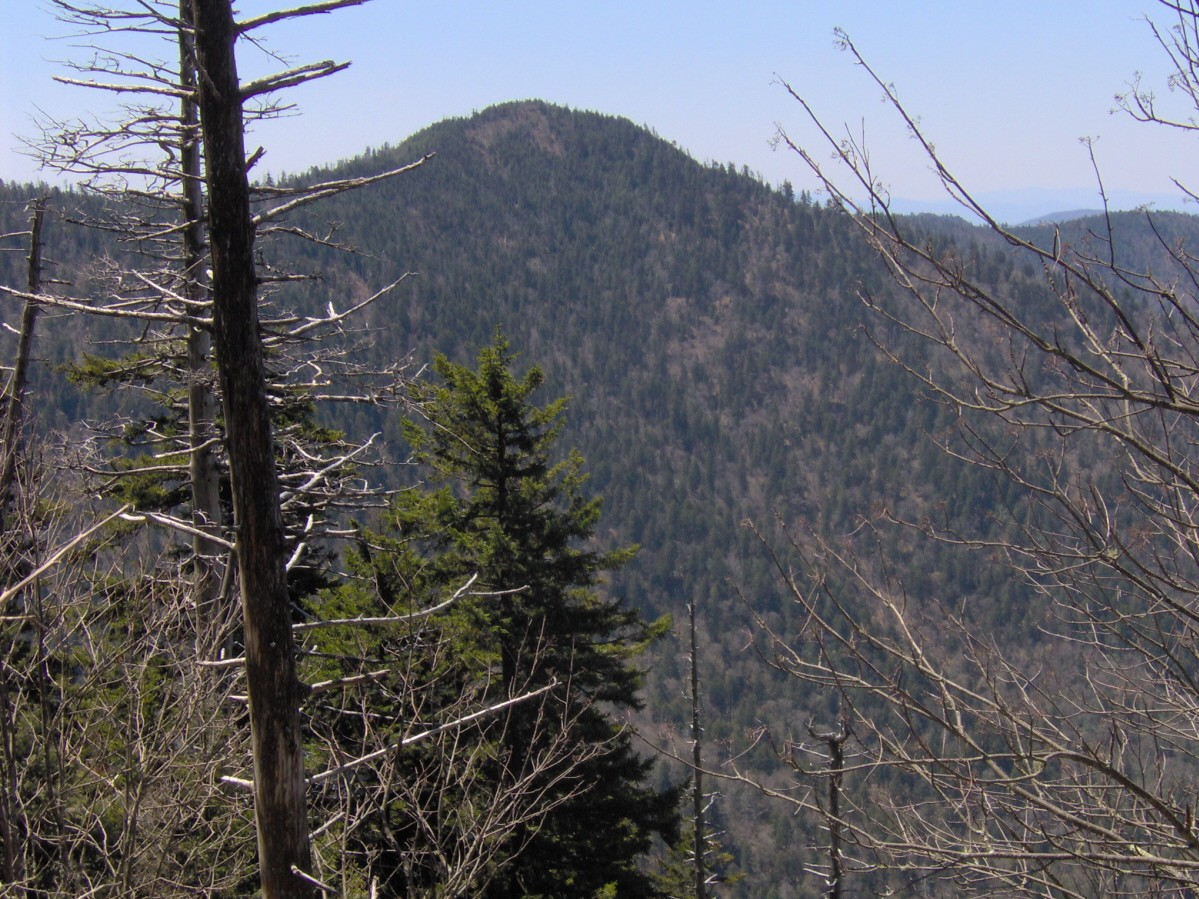
- Mount Chapman, viewed from Mount Guyot

Highest point
- Elevation: 6,427 ft (1,959 m)
- Prominence: 617 ft (188 m)
- Parent peak: Mount Guyot
- Listing: Great Smoky Mountains National Park
- Coordinates: 35°41′12.32″N 83°16′15.53″W

Geography
- Location within Tennessee
- Location: Sevier County, Tennessee
- Parent range: Blue Ridge Mountains
- Topo map: USGS Mount Guyot

Mount Chapman is a mountain in the Great Smoky Mountains, located in the Southeastern United States. It has an elevation of 6,427 feet (1,959 m) above sea level. While the mountain is located deep within the Smokies, the Appalachian Trail crosses its eastern slope, coming to within 200 feet (61 m) of the summit. Mount Chapman is among the 10 highest mountains in the Appalachian range, if subpeaks are not included.

Mount Chapman is situated along the Tennessee-North Carolina border, with Sevier County to the north and Swain County to the south. Like its neighbor Mount Guyot, Chapman is a double peak, with the southern peak being the true summit. A 1,500-foot (460 m) gap divides Chapman from Dashoga Ridge (i.e., Mount Hardison and Marks Knob), just two miles (3 km) to the east. Its western slope, known as Chapman Lead, is more gradual, descending roughly 4,000 feet (1,200 m) over 5 miles (8.0 km) to its base along the headwaters of the Little Pigeon River. Chapman Lead parallels Guyot Spur to the north, with Buck Fork between the two ridges. The summit is coated in a dense stand of Southern Appalachian spruce-fir forest.

The remoteness of Mount Chapman has left it largely untouched by human history. The mountain is named after Colonel David C. Chapman, a Knoxville business leader who led efforts to establish a national park in the Smokies. As head of the Tennessee Great Smoky Mountains Park Commission from 1927 to 1937, Chapman raised funds and negotiated hundreds of land purchases that helped make the park possible. Arnold Guyot crossed Mount Chapman in the late 1850s, measuring the mountain's summit at 6,447 feet (Guyot called it "Mount Alexander" after a Princeton colleague). The leg of the Appalachian Trail crossing Chapman's eastern slope was constructed in 1935.

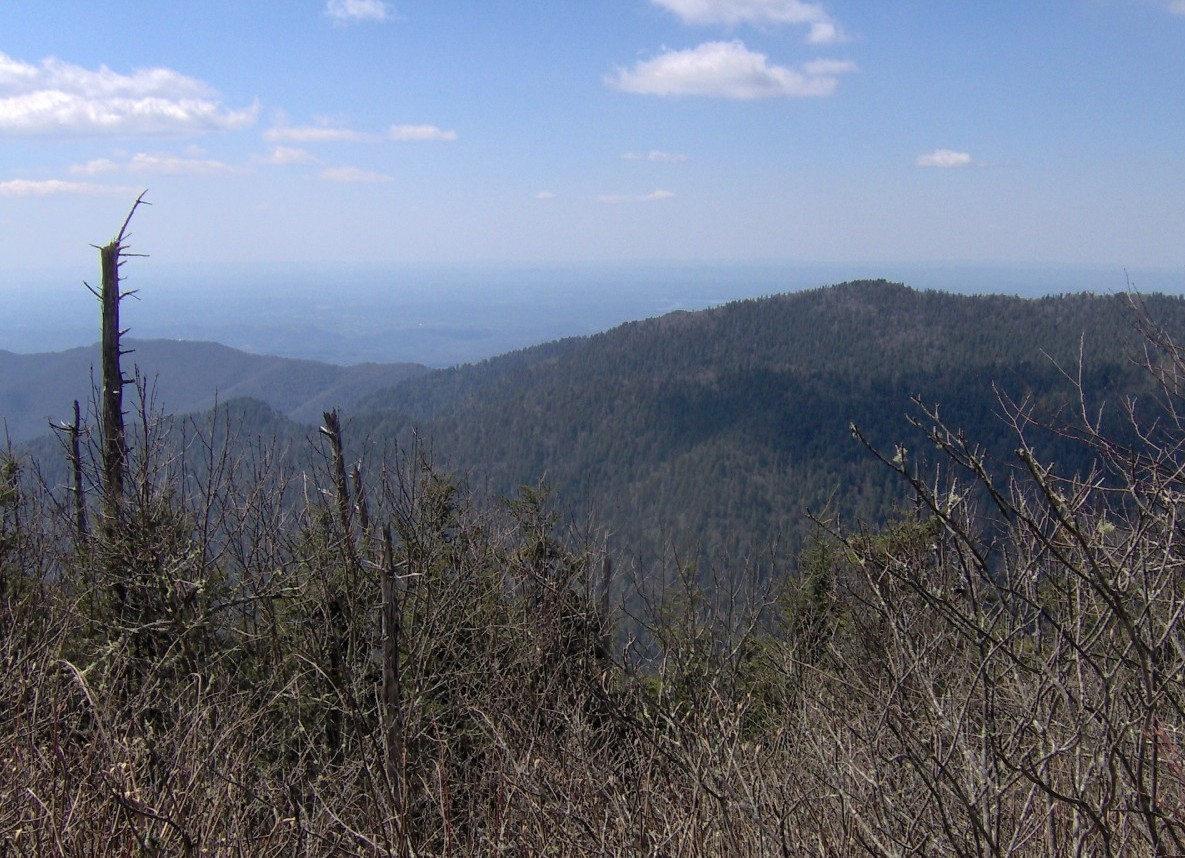
The view looking north from Mount Chapman, near the summit.

Mount Chapman is approximately 11 miles (18 km) from the nearest parking lot at the Cosby Campground and 14.5 miles (23.3 km) from Newfound Gap. From the Cosby Campground (specifically behind Campsite B51), the Snake Den Ridge Trail winds for 5.3 miles (8.5 km) to its junction with the Appalachian Trail at Inadu Knob. Chapman's main peak is approximately 5.2 miles (8.4 km) to the south of Inadu Knob, with the trail first crossing the slopes of Old Black, Mount Guyot, and Tricorner Knob. A short bushwhack is required to reach the summit. The Tricorner Knob Shelter is approximately 1.5 miles (2.4 km) to the northeast of Mount Chapman.

== See also ==
- List of mountains in North Carolina
