= Tricorner Knob =

Mountain in the southeastern United States

Coordinates: 35.69556°N 83.25417°W

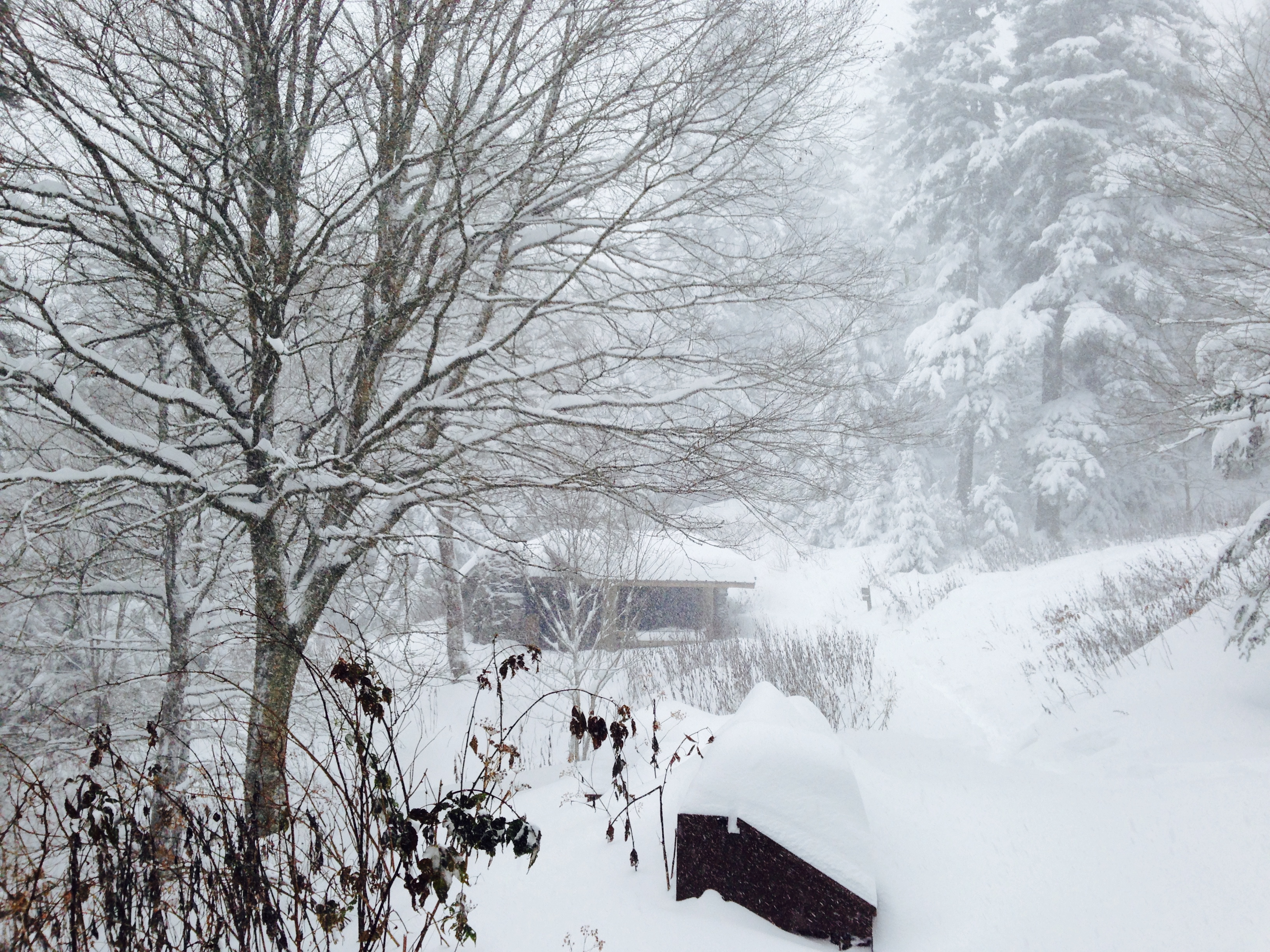
Snow cover at the Tricorner Knob Shelter

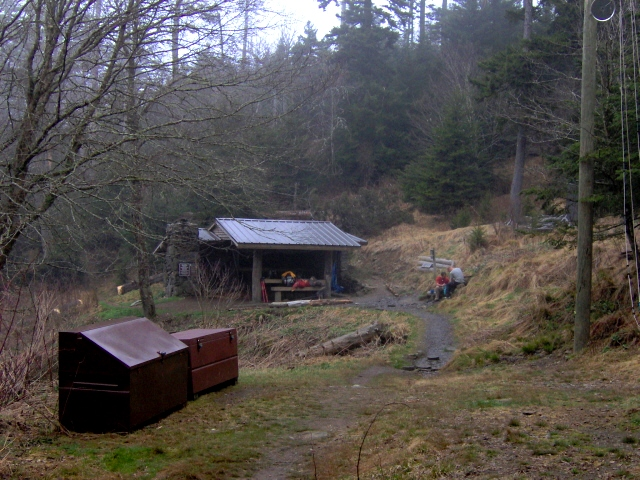
Hikers at the Tricorner Knob Shelter

Tricorner Knob is a mountain in the Great Smoky Mountains, located in the southeastern United States. It has an elevation of 6,120 feet (1,870 m), with 160 feet (49 m) of clean prominence. The Appalachian and Balsam Mountain trails intersect near the mountain's summit, making Tricorner Knob the great crossroads of the eastern Smokies.

== Description ==
Like much of the Smokies crest, Tricorner Knob is on the border between Tennessee and North Carolina. As its name implies, the mountain is at the point where the Balsam Mountains intersect the crest of the Great Smokies, creating a triangular-shaped ridge. Three counties intersect at the summit of Tricorner, with Sevier County, Tennessee, to the west, Haywood County, North Carolina, to the northeast, and Swain County, North Carolina, to the southeast. The mountain rises approximately 3,300 feet (1,000 m) above its western base at the mouth of Buck Fork, along the Little Pigeon River. Tricorner is the ninth-highest mountain in Tennessee and the 27th-highest mountain in North Carolina.

== History ==
Tricorner Knob's remote situation in the dense Southern Appalachian spruce–fir forest of the eastern Smokies has left it largely untouched by human history. Arnold Guyot measured its elevation on his survey of the crest of the Smokies in 1859, placing Tricorner's elevation at 6,188 feet (1,886 m).

Other than surveyors and the occasional naturalist, the mountain was devoid of human visitors until a segment of the Appalachian Trail was constructed across its western slope in 1935. An isolated spring on the mountain's southern slope was the key reason behind its selection for the back country campsite where the Tricorner Knob Shelter sits today.

Laura Thornborough, a writer who visited the mountain in the late 1930s, called Tricorner Knob one of the last "true wilderness areas, where one can commune with nature and leave the cares of the world behind."

== Access ==
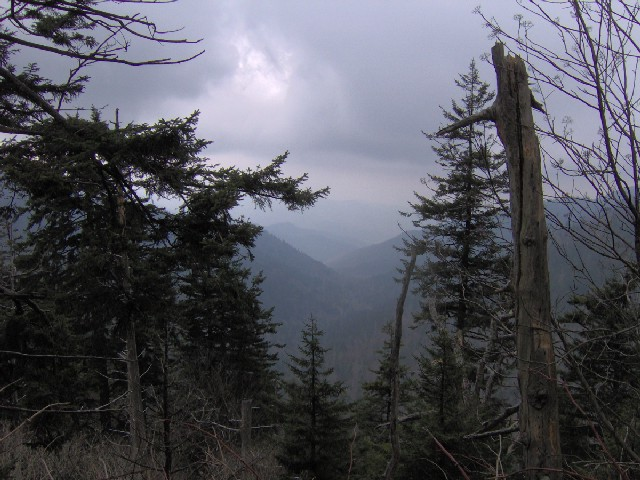
The remote Buck Fork Valley, looking west from Tricorner Knob, near 6,000 feet

Tricorner Knob can be accessed via a lengthy hike. From the Cosby Campground (specifically behind Campsite B51), the Snake Den Ridge Trail winds 5.3 miles (8.5 km) up the ridge to its junction with the Appalachian Trail. From this junction, Tricorner is 3.7 miles (6.0 km) away, with the trail first crossing the slopes of Old Black and Mount Guyot.

The Balsam Mountain Trail is a 6-mile (9.7 km) trail connecting the Appalachian Trail in the west with the Benton MacKaye Trail to the east. The latter can be accessed via a sharp bend in Straight Fork Road, a rugged gravel road rising out of Cherokee, North Carolina. From this bend, Tricorner Knob is just over 10 miles (16 km) away. A 15-mile (24 km) section of the Appalachian Trail connects Tricorner Knob with Newfound Gap in the central Smokies.

The Tricorner Knob Shelter can accommodate 12 people. Overnight campers are required to get a permit from the park service. The shelter is approximately halfway between the Peck's Corner Shelter to the west and the Cosby Knob Shelter to the northeast.
