= Old Black (Great Smoky Mountains) =

Mountain in United States of America

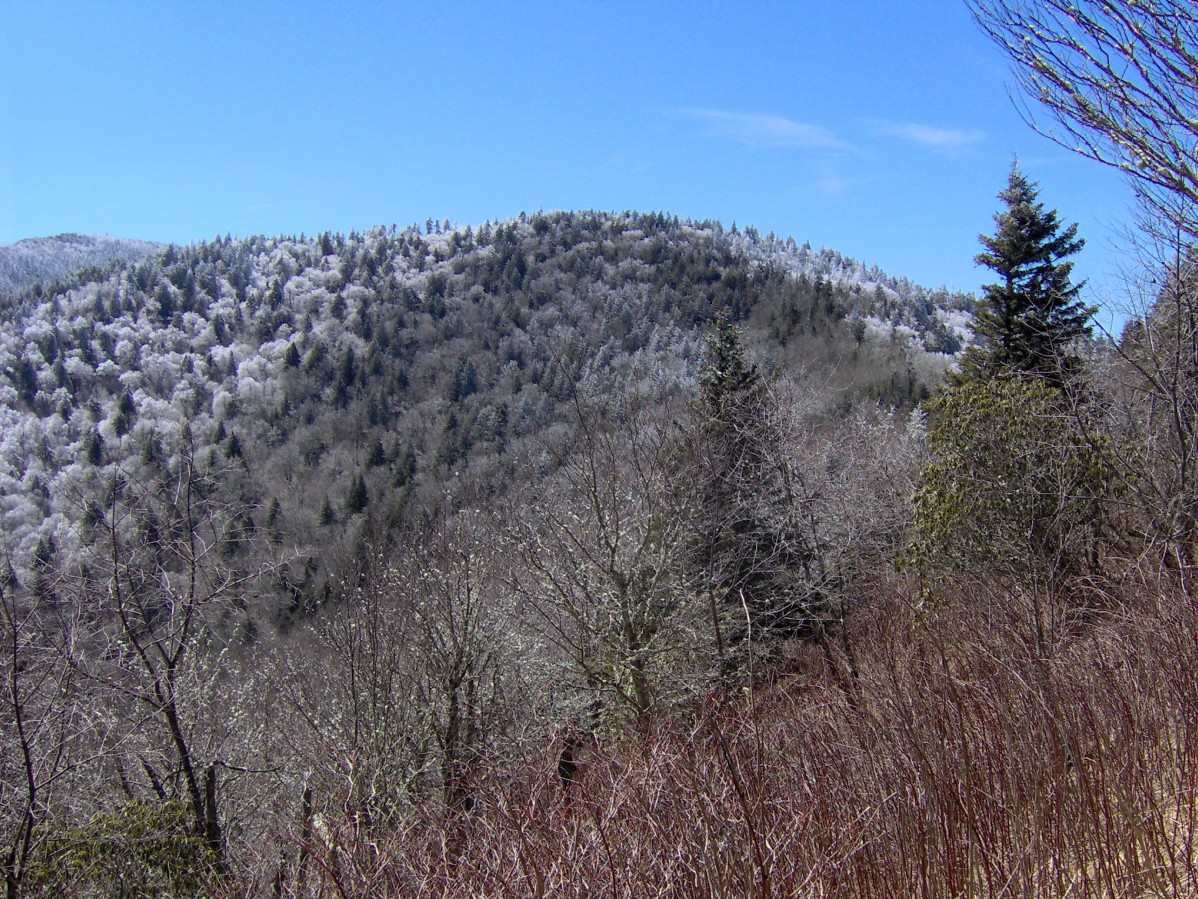
- The summit of Old Black, looking southwest from the Appalachian Trail

Highest point
- Elevation: 6,370 ft (1,940 m)
- Prominence: 170 ft (52 m)
- Coordinates: 35°42′54″N 83°15′20″W

Geography
- Location: Haywood County, North Carolina; Cocke County, Tennessee; Sevier County, Tennessee, U.S.
- Parent range: Great Smoky Mountains
- Topo map: USGS Mount Guyot

Climbing
- Easiest route: Snake Den Ridge Trail + Appalachian Trail + bushwhack

Old Black is a mountain in the Great Smoky Mountains, located in the Southeastern United States. While often overshadowed by Mount Guyot, its higher neighbor to the south, Old Black is the 5th-highest mountain in Tennessee and the 7th-highest in the Great Smoky Mountains National Park. The Appalachian Trail crosses its western slope, connecting the Cosby-area trail system with the heart of the eastern Smokies.

Like much of the Smokies crest, Old Black lies along the border between Tennessee and North Carolina, with Cocke County and Sevier County to the west and Haywood County to the east. The mountain rises 4,400 feet (1,300 m) above its northwestern base near Rocky Grove and 3,300 feet (1,000 m) above its southeastern base near Walnut Bottom. Old Black is part of the Guyot massif, which extends deep into the interior of the Smokies. A ridge known as Pinnacle Lead intersects this massif—which comprises the eastern section of the crest of the Smokies—on the western slope of Old Black, giving Old Black a triangular shape similar to that of Tricorner Knob to the south.

Old Black gets its name from the dense Southern Appalachian spruce–fir forest that covers its higher elevations. From afar, this forest takes on a dark green character, especially in cooler months when contrasted with the brown hardwood forest in lower elevations. This forest also adds to Old Black's blunt appearance—that of a low pyramid with a wide base.

== Geology ==
Old Black comprises Thunderhead sandstone, a type of Precambrian metamorphic rock common throughout the Smokies. The rock is part of the Ocoee Supergroup, which was formed from ocean sediments nearly a billion years ago. The mountain was created over 200 million years ago during the Appalachian orogeny, when the North American and African plates collided, thrusting the rock upward.

== History ==
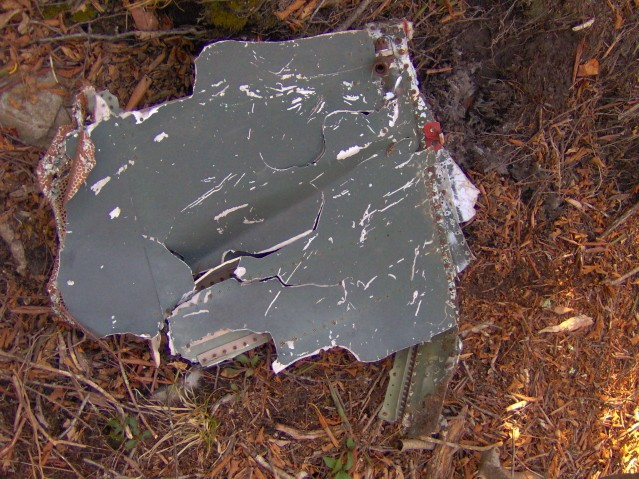
Wreckage from an F4 Phantom that crashed near Old Black in 1984

Arnold Guyot first measured the elevation of Old Black on his survey of the crest of the Smokies in the late 1850s. Guyot measured the mountain's elevation at 6,373 feet (1,942 m), missing the modern measurement by just three feet. While Guyot initially named the mountain "Mount Henry" after the director of the Smithsonian Institution, "Old Black" was the name that stuck.

In 1935, the CCC constructed a segment of the Appalachian Trail across the western slope of Old Black. Laura Thornborough, a writer who made several excursions to the area in the 1930s, recalls the thick spruce forest that dominates in the eastern Smokies:

As the A.T. swings around the Tennessee side of Guyot, it passes through what is believed to be the densest stand of spruce and balsam in the Great Smokies.

In 1984, an F-4 Phantom fighter plane crashed into the ridge between Inadu Knob and Old Black. Some of the wreckage from this crash remains scattered about the area, with some fragments located in an area along the Appalachian Trail about a quarter-mile west of the trail's junction with the Snake Den Ridge Trail. A short spur trail winds through the wreckage.

== Access ==
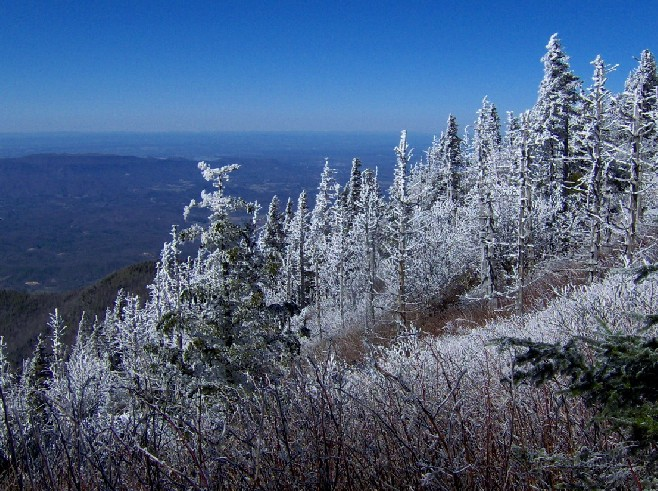
View from the western slope of Old Black, at just over 6,000 feet. Cocke County, Tennessee is below.

Like most of the key peaks of the eastern Smokies, Old Black can only be reached via a lengthy hike. The mountain is just over six miles (ten kilometres) from the nearest parking lot at the Cosby Campground. The quickest route involves following the Snake Den Ridge Trail out of Cosby (the trailhead is behind Campsite B51) for 5.3 miles (8.5 km) to the Appalachian Trail junction at Inadu Knob. From this junction, Old Black is nearly a mile to the northwest. The trail comes to within less than a 10th of a mile from the summit, but the thickness of the forest atop the mountain will considerably slow any bushwhack attempt and make off-trail navigation difficult.

As the Appalachian Trail crosses Old Black's western slope, various clearings allow for views of Cocke County and Sevier County, Tennessee to the north and northwest. Along the mountain's northeast slope, near a clearing used for a high-altitude helicopter landing pad, much of the eastern Smokies and the Great Balsam Mountains can be seen, including Mount Sterling and Luftee Knob. Some of the finest views of Mount Guyot can be seen from this point.
