= Snake Den Ridge Trail =

Hiking trail in Tennessee, United States

Coordinates: 35.7531°N 83.2104°W

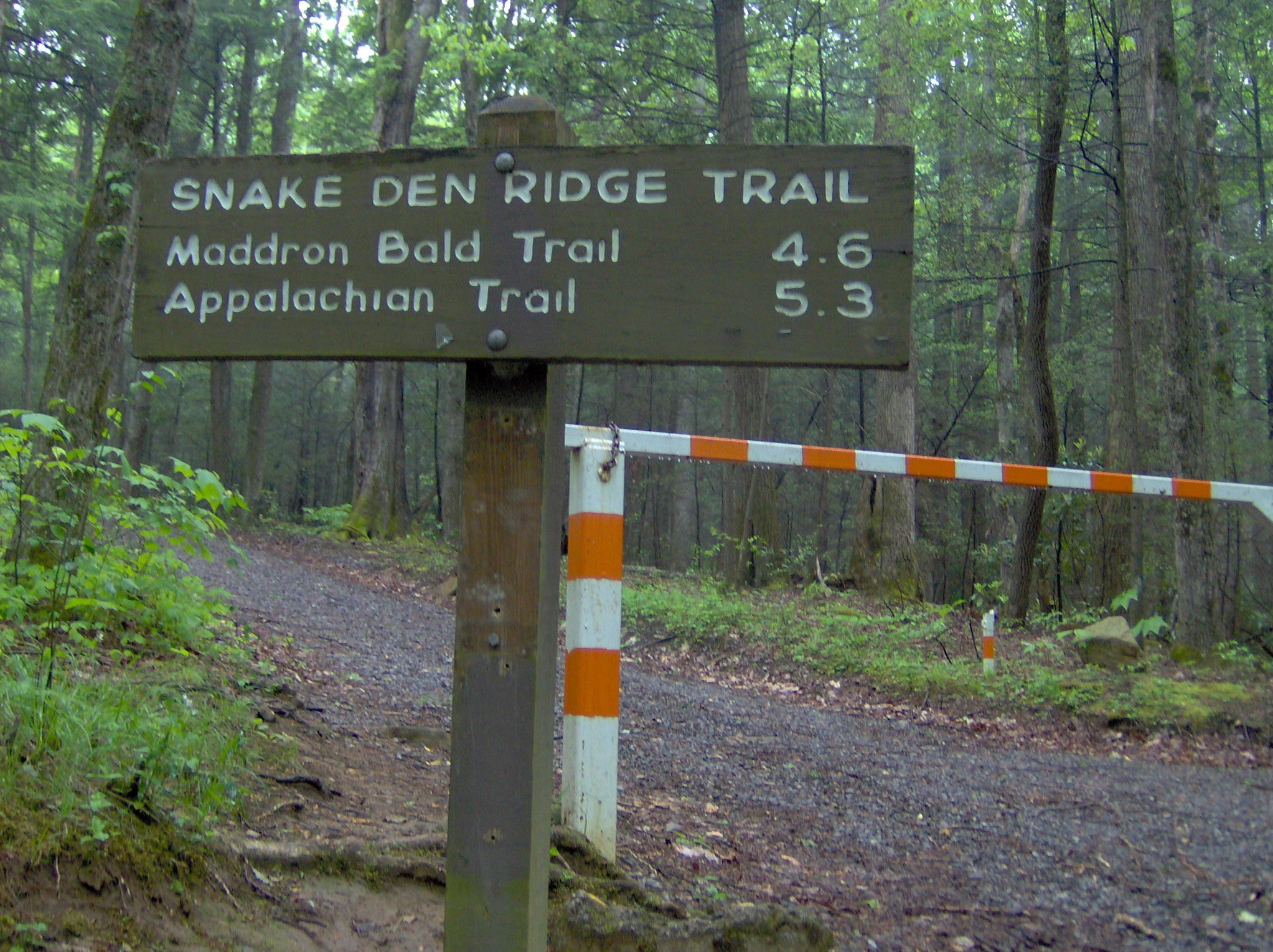
- Snake Den Ridge Trailhead at Cosby Campground
- Length: 5.3 mi (8.5 km)
- Location: Great Smoky Mountains National Park, Tennessee, United States
- Trailheads: Cosby Campground (near Campsite B51); Junction with the Appalachian Trail near the summit of Inadu Knob
- Use: Hiking
- Highest point: Appalachian Trail junction, 5,800 ft (1,800 m)
- Lowest point: Cosby Campground, 2,360 ft (720 m)
- Difficulty: Moderate-to-Strenuous
- Season: Open year-round
- Sights: Views of the lower Pigeon River and French Broad River valleys and the crest of the Eastern Smokies; multiple forest types; Rock Creek and Inadu Creek
- Hazards: ice hazards in colder months

The Snake Den Ridge Trail is an American hiking trail in the Great Smoky Mountains National Park of Cocke County, Tennessee. Winding its way up the backbone-like crest of Snake Den Ridge, the trail connects the Cosby Campground to the Appalachian Trail and provides the quickest access to the high peaks of the Eastern Smokies. The trail passes through three forest types— a mixed deciduous forest at its lower elevations, a substantial stand of heath bald on the more narrow sections of the ridge crest, and an old growth northern-style coniferous forest at its higher elevations.

The trailhead is located at the Cosby Campground across the street from Campsite B51, at the southwest end of the campground. Spur trails connect the trailhead to the Low Gap Trail to the east and the Gabes Mountain Trail to the north. A substantial parking lot for hikers is located on the opposite side of the campground, near the ranger station. The park's Cosby entrance is located just off Tennessee State Route 32, which splits off from U.S. Route 321 in the town of Cosby.

== Vital information ==
- With a few minor exceptions (namely the two creek crossings), the Snake Den Ridge Trail is a continuous, unbroken ascent from trailhead to trail terminus. The ascent is very gradual at first, following an old maintenance road, but becomes rugged and steep just beyond the maintenance road's cul-de-sac. The section between the Inadu Creek crossing and the Maddron Bald Trail junction winds through multiple switchbacks.
- There is no footbridge at the Inadu Creek crossing, but the stream is usually passable with little effort. Like any mountain stream, however, heavy rains can render Inadu Creek volatile and unpredictable.
- As the trail approaches the Maddron Bald Trail junction, it ascends a poorly lit and poorly drained section of the ridgecrest laden with rocks. In colder months, the water that accumulates along this section of the trail freezes over, coating the rocks in a sheet of ice.
- The Cosby Knob Shelter is located along the Appalachian Trail 2.5 miles (4.0 km) east (going northward) of the Snake Den Ridge Trail junction. The Tricorner Knob Shelter is located along the Appalachian Trail 3.7 miles (6.0 km) southwest of the Snake Den Ridge Trail junction.

== Landmarks/overlooks ==
- Cosby Campground (0.0 miles)
- Cosby Horse Trail junction (0.3 miles)
- Old cemetery (appx. 0.5 miles)
- Cul-de-sac end of maintenance road/Rock Creek overlook (appx. 1 mile)
- Rock Creek crossing (appx. 1.1 miles)
- Inadu Creek crossing, small waterfall (appx. 2 miles)
- The trail enters heath stands (appx. 2.5-3.5 miles)
- Maddron Bald Trail junction (4.6 miles)
- F4 Phantom plane crash wreckage (appx. 5 miles)
- Appalachian Trail junction, view of Upper Cosby valley (5.3 miles)
- Views of Mount Guyot, Old Black, Luftee Knob and the Balsam crest, and the Tennessee Valley (1–2 miles west of trail terminus)

== Geographical information ==
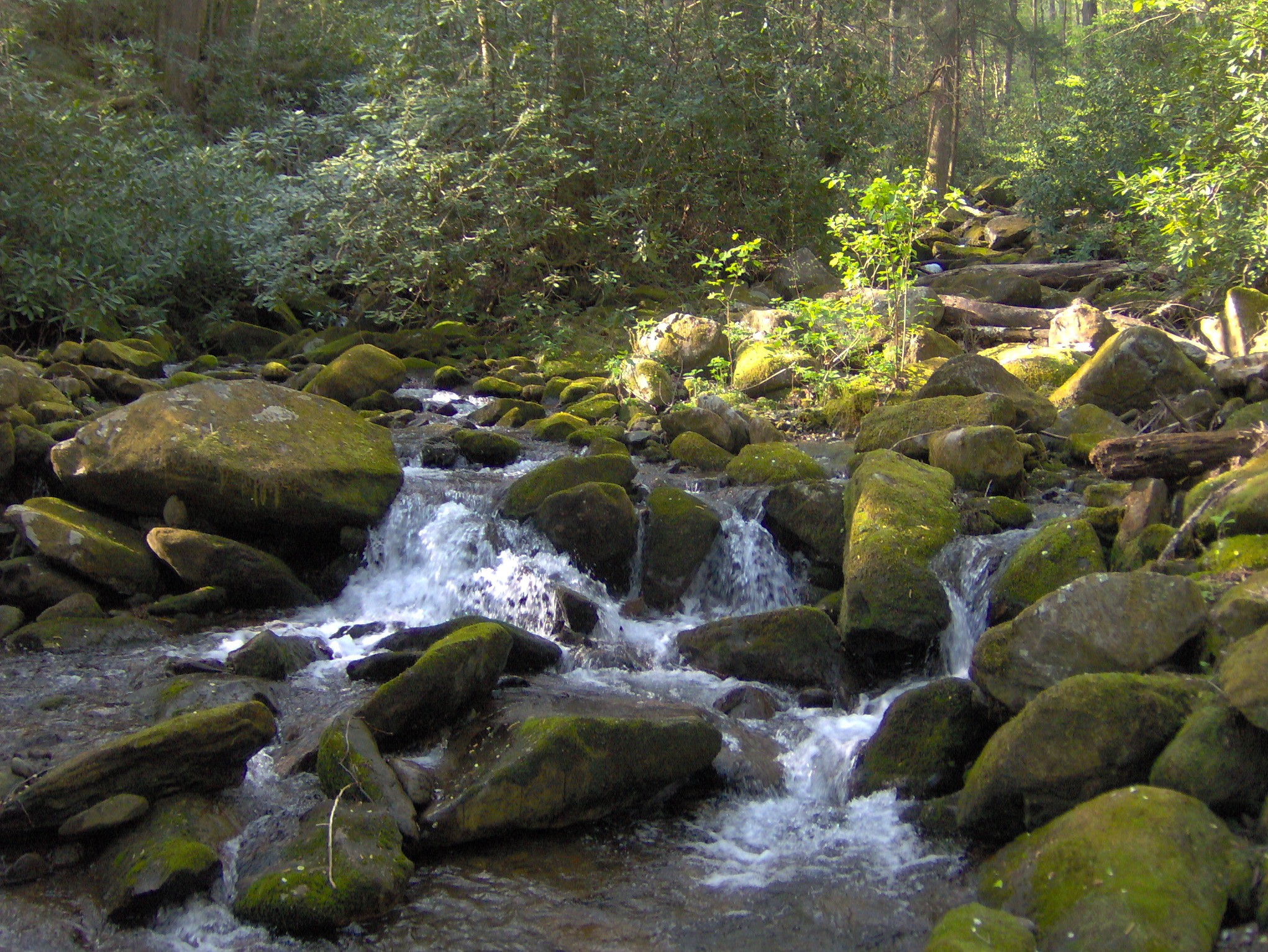
Rock Creek

Snake Den Ridge is the westernmost of a series of narrow ridges that descend northward from Inadu Knob, a 5,925-foot (1,806 m) summit straddling the main crest of the Smokies just north of Old Black. Inadu Knob is the northernmost of the high summits of the Eastern Smokies and the last mile-high summit traversed by the Appalachian Trail heading northward before the trail begins its descent to the Pigeon River Valley. The ridge's name refers to the snake dens allegedly found along its lower reaches (snake dens are common at mid-level elevations in this section of the park according to folk lore). "Inadu"— the Cherokee word for "imaginary snake"— echoes this description.

Inadu Creek parallels the southern base of Snake Den Ridge, flowing in a northeastward direction toward Cosby Campground before emptying into Crying Creek near the Gabes Mountain Trailhead. The northern flank of Snake Den Ridge is drained by the upper Greenbrier Creek watershed. All of these streams are part of the greater Pigeon River watershed.

== Trail synopsis ==
=== Cosby Campground to Inadu Creek — 2 miles ===
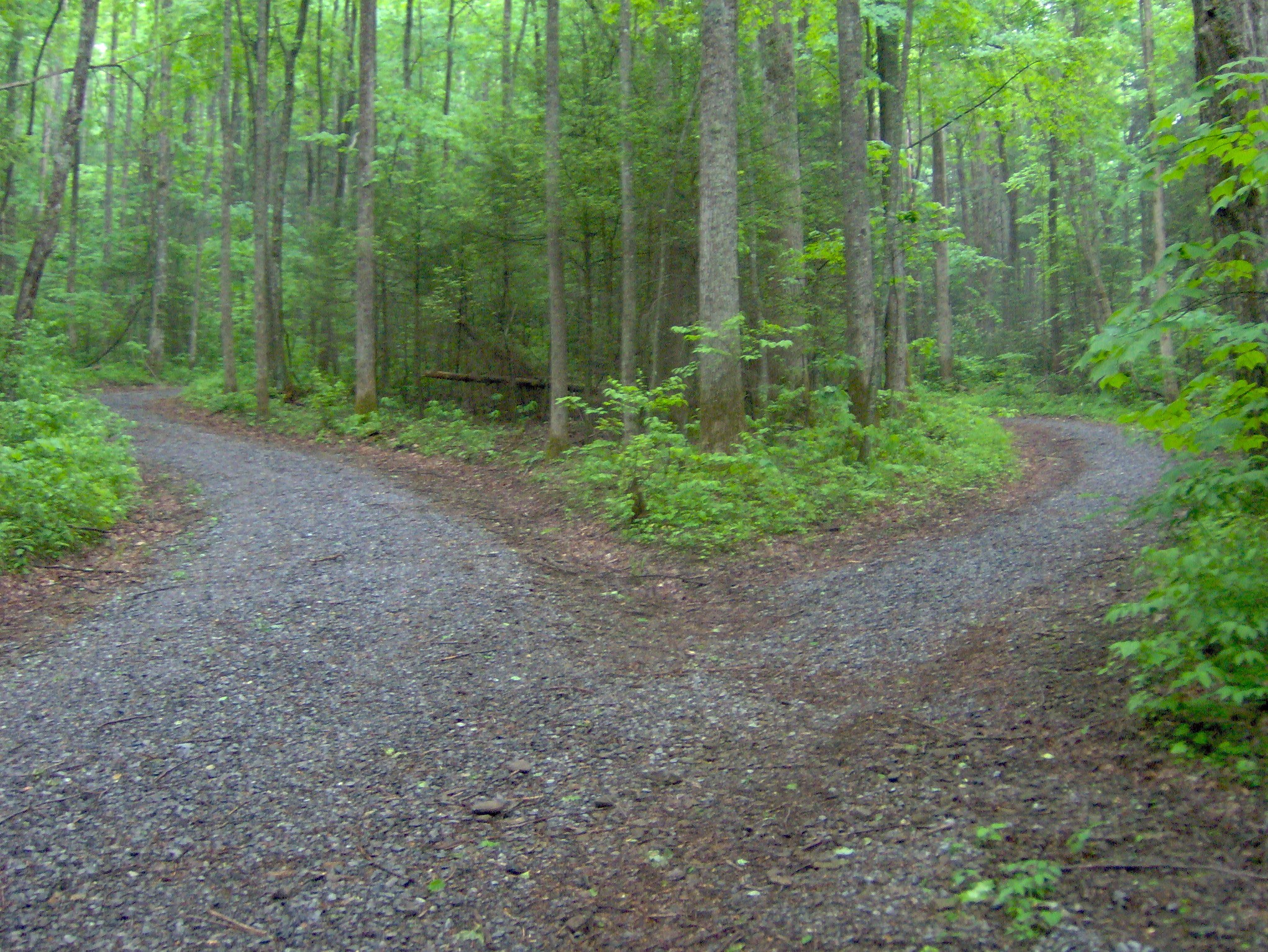
Cul-de-sac end of the gravel road, appx. 1 mile from the trailhead.

Campsites at the Cosby Campground are organized into "A" group and "B" group, with the B group being south of the A group. The Snake Den Ridge Trailhead is located across the street from Campsite B51. The hikers' parking lot is situated on the other side of the campground, so dayhikers must cross the campground (appx. 0.2 miles (0.32 km)) to reach the trailhead. From the trailhead, the trail follows a gravel maintenance road 0.3 miles (0.48 km) to its intersection with the Cosby Horse Trail, which connects the Snake Den Ridge Trail to the Low Gap Trail on the slopes of Mount Cammerer. The Snake Den Ridge Trail continues westward, rising gradually along the gravel road. At approximately 0.5 miles (0.80 km), the trail passes a small cemetery, which contains several burials of residents who lived in the Cosby Campground vicinity before the creation of the park. One notable burial is Ella Costner (1894-1982), the "Poet Laureate of the Smokies," who wrote extensively of the Eastern Smokies region.

Beyond the cemetery, the trail continues its gradual ascent along the old gravel road. At approximately one mile, the road ends in a cul-de-sac. A brief spur path on the right (north) leads to a low cliff overlooking Rock Creek. The Snake Den Ridge Trail continues westward near the top of the cul-de-sac, where it departs from the gravel road to follow a rugged backcountry trail (there is no sign, but the trail is marked by a string of mid-sized rocks). Shortly thereafter, the trail descends briefly to cross Rock Creek. The creek can be crossed via the log footbridge or an adjacent low fording area.

After the Rock Creek crossing the Snake Den Ridge Trail begins a steep ascent toward Inadu Creek, which it briefly parallels. At around 1.5 miles (2.4 km), the trail turns sharply to the south for several hundred yards before switching back to the west and reapproaching Inadu Creek. From this section of the trail, the crest of Snake Den Ridge is discernible through the treeline. After a series of relatively steep inclines, the trail finally turns northward and briefly descends to the creek.

=== Inadu Creek to Maddron Bald Trail junction — 2.6 miles ===
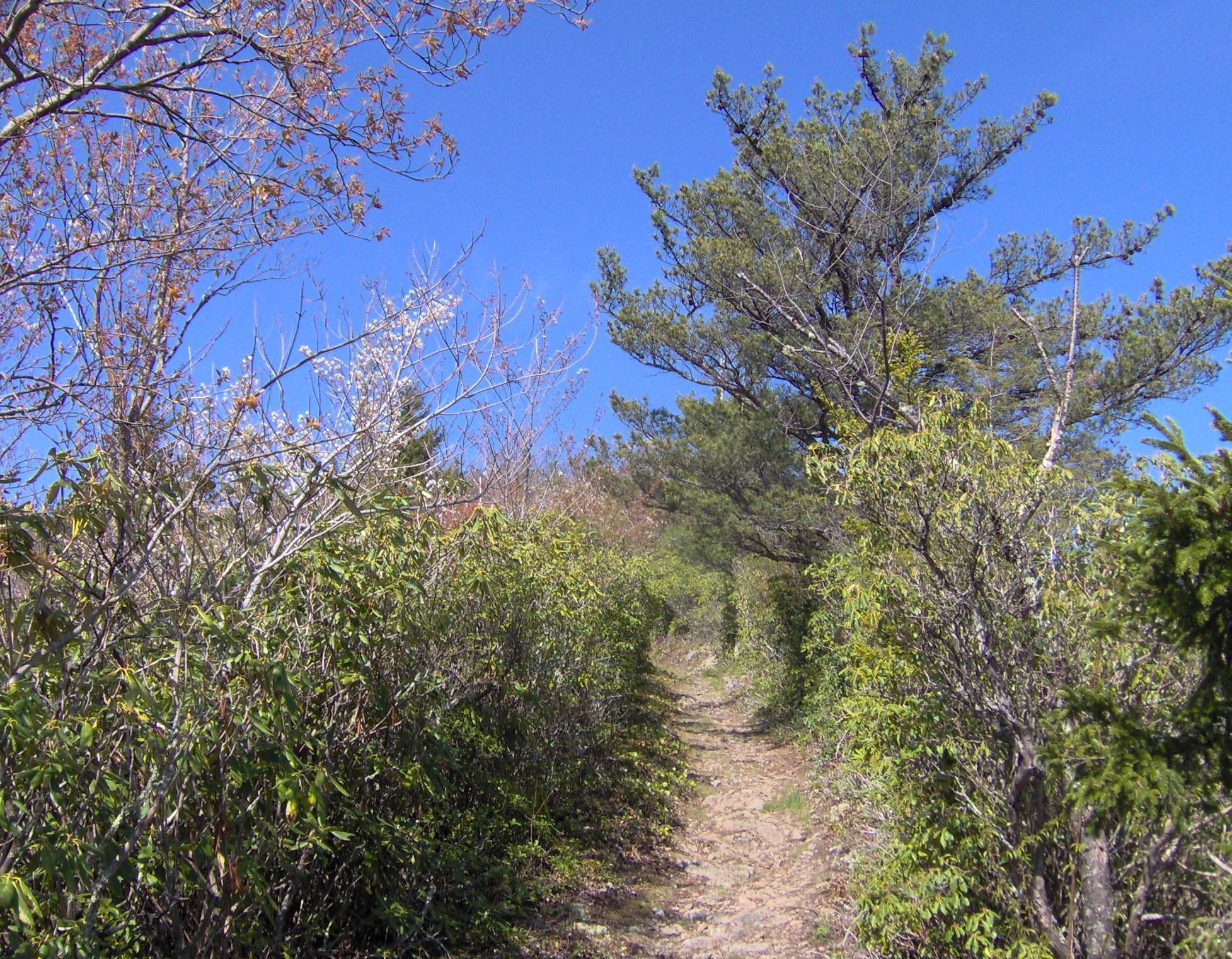
The Snake Den Ridge Trail entering a stand of heath along the ridgecrest.

The Snake Den Ridge Trail crosses Inadu Creek immediately upstream from a small waterfall. The creek's streambed, like most streams on the slopes of the Smokies, is filled with boulders. From Inadu Creek, the trail follows a steep incline northward to the crest of the ridge, where it turns westward again to ascend along the ridgecrest. The trail follows a series of inclines and switchbacks as it winds its way across the top of the ridge. Views through the treeline of Cocke County to the north alternate with views of Camel Hump Ridge and the main Smokies crest to the south as the trail switches back and forth across the ridgeline.

As it ascends the crest of Snake Den Ridge, the trail traverses several backbone formations lined with thick stands of rhododendron and mountain laurel known as heaths (sometimes called "hells" in Appalachia). Heaths often appear on narrow ridges, where the soil is too poor to support larger wooded plants. One of the park's most spectacular examples of heath bald occurs atop Maddron Bald, a mountain rising to the west of Snake Den Ridge.

At around 4 miles (6.4 km), vestiges of the coniferous forest that blankets the higher elevations in the Smokies begin to appear. The trail passes through a final switchback to the poorly lit western flank of Snake Den Ridge and ascends southward along a steep, rock-strewn incline to its junction with the Maddron Bald Trail. Maddron's heath-covered summit is located along the Maddron Bald Trail approximately 0.5 miles (0.80 km) west of the Snake Den Ridge Trail junction.

=== Maddron Bald Trail junction to Appalachian Trail — 0.7 miles ===
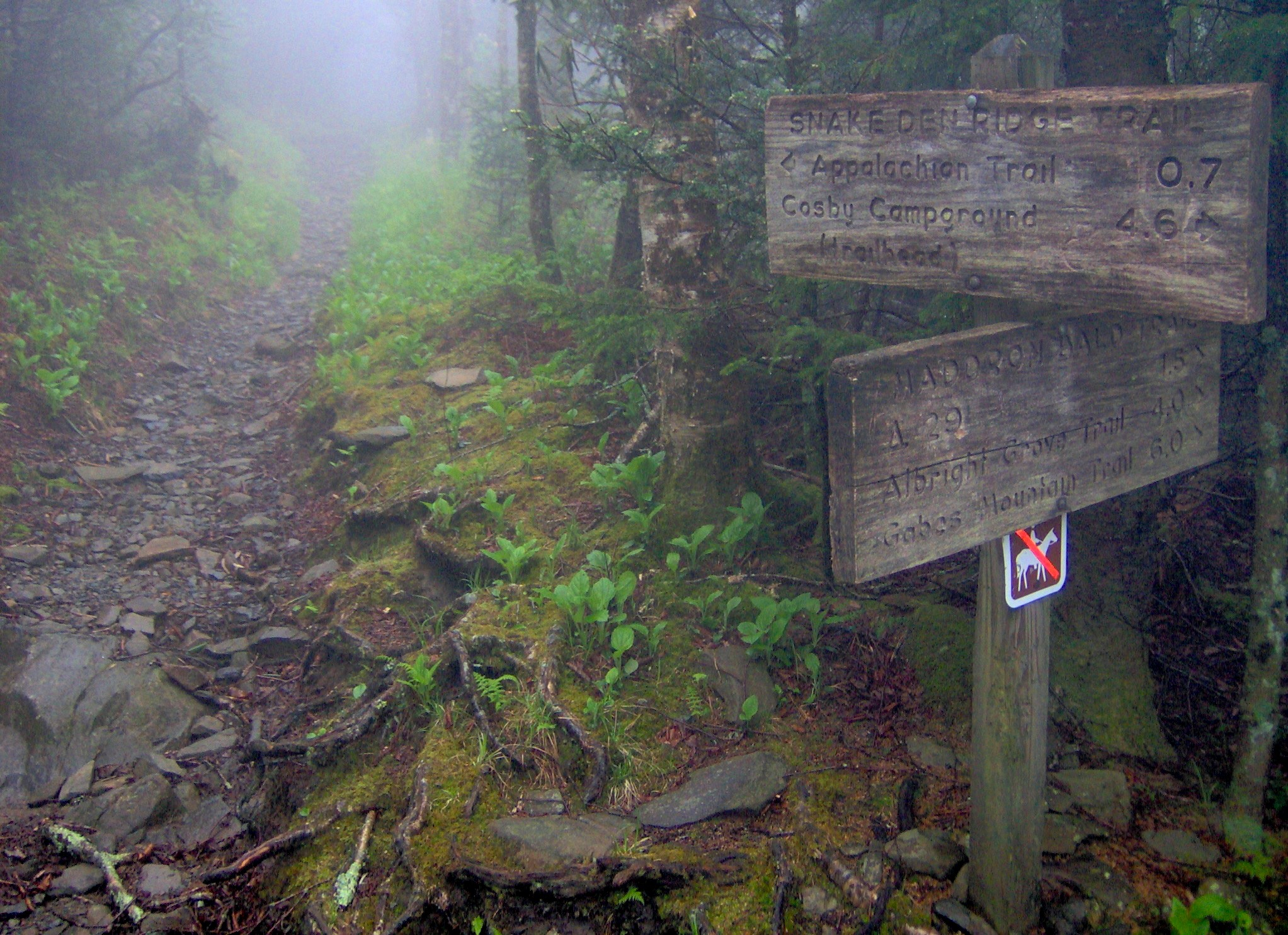
The Snake Den Ridge Trail at its Maddron Bald Trail junction

At the Maddron Bald Trail junction, the Snake Den Ridge Trail continues southward up into the northern-style forest. Just beyond the junction, before the trail turns briefly to the east, the summits of Inadu Knob and Old Black are visible through a break in the foliage. The inclines along this last section of the trail become more gradual before culminating a final sharp ascent to the Appalachian Trail. At this junction, there is a large outcropping of contorted sandstone and a view of the Upper Cosby Valley to the southeast.

Near the Appalachian Trail junction, a few pieces of wreckage from an F4 Phantom fighter jet are scattered along the trail. This plane crashed near the summit of Inadu Knob in 1984. A more substantial scattering of this wreckage can be found along the Appalachian Trail, just south of the Snake Den Ridge Trail junction.

A high-altitude helicopter landing pad is located along the Appalachian Trail in the gap between Inadu Knob and Old Black, approximately 1 mile (1.6 km) southwest of the Snake Den Ridge junction. This landing pad area allows an unobstructed view of the high peaks of the Eastern Smokies, with Old Black and Mount Guyot to the southwest, Luftee Knob to the south, and Big Cataloochee Mountain and Mount Sterling to the southeast. Just beyond the landing area, on the slopes of Old Black, there are several breaks in the treeline opening up views of the Tennessee Valley to the northwest and Kuwohi and Mount Le Conte to the west.

== Photo gallery ==
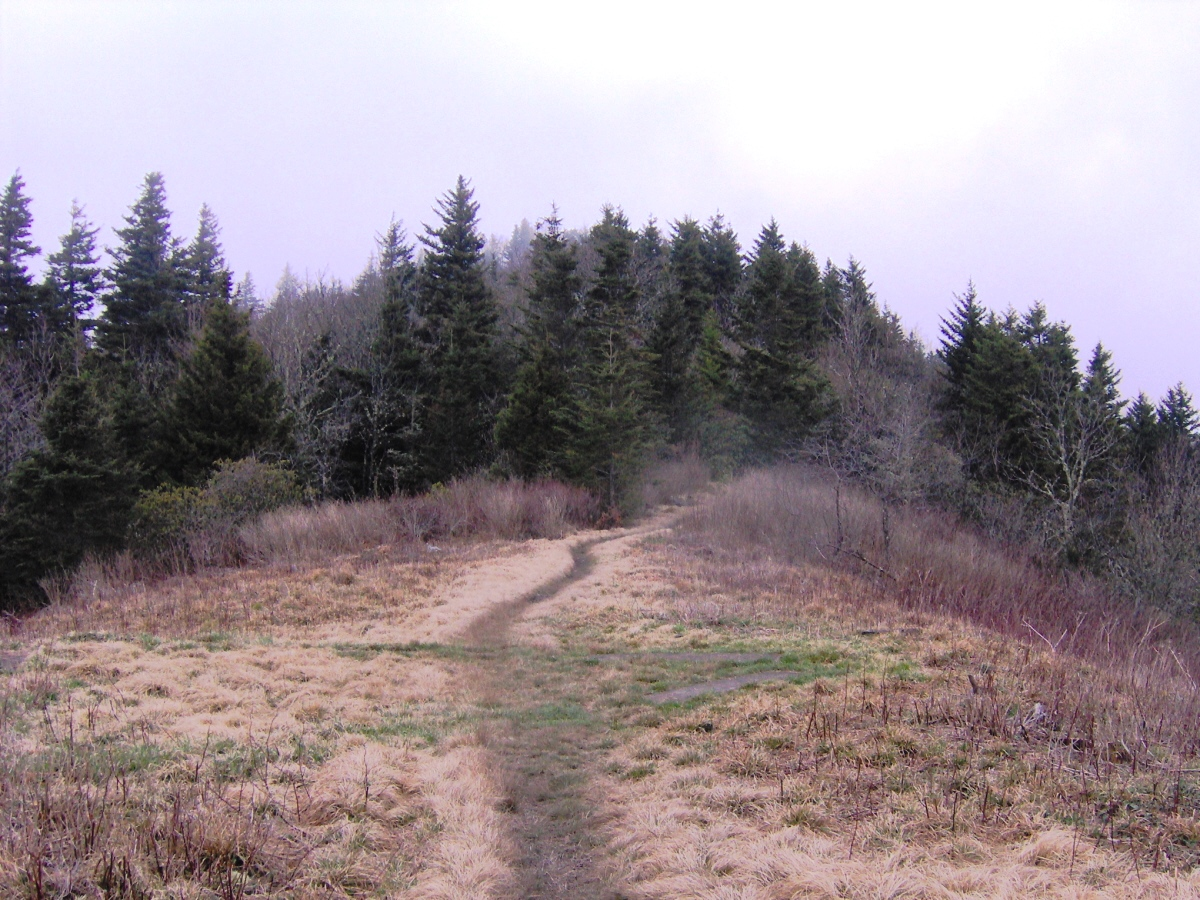
The summit of Inadu Knob, viewed from the A.T.

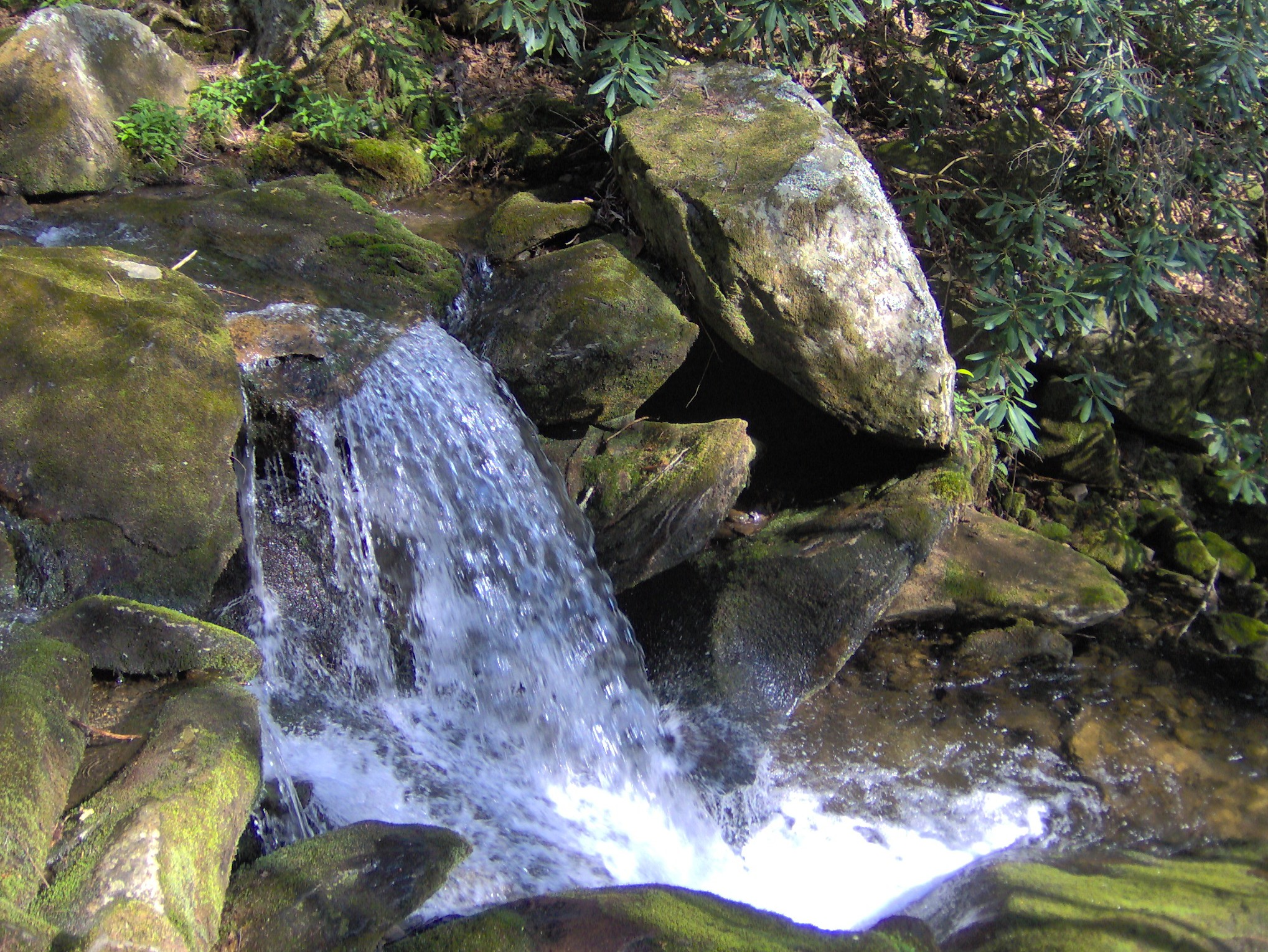
Inadu Creek crossing

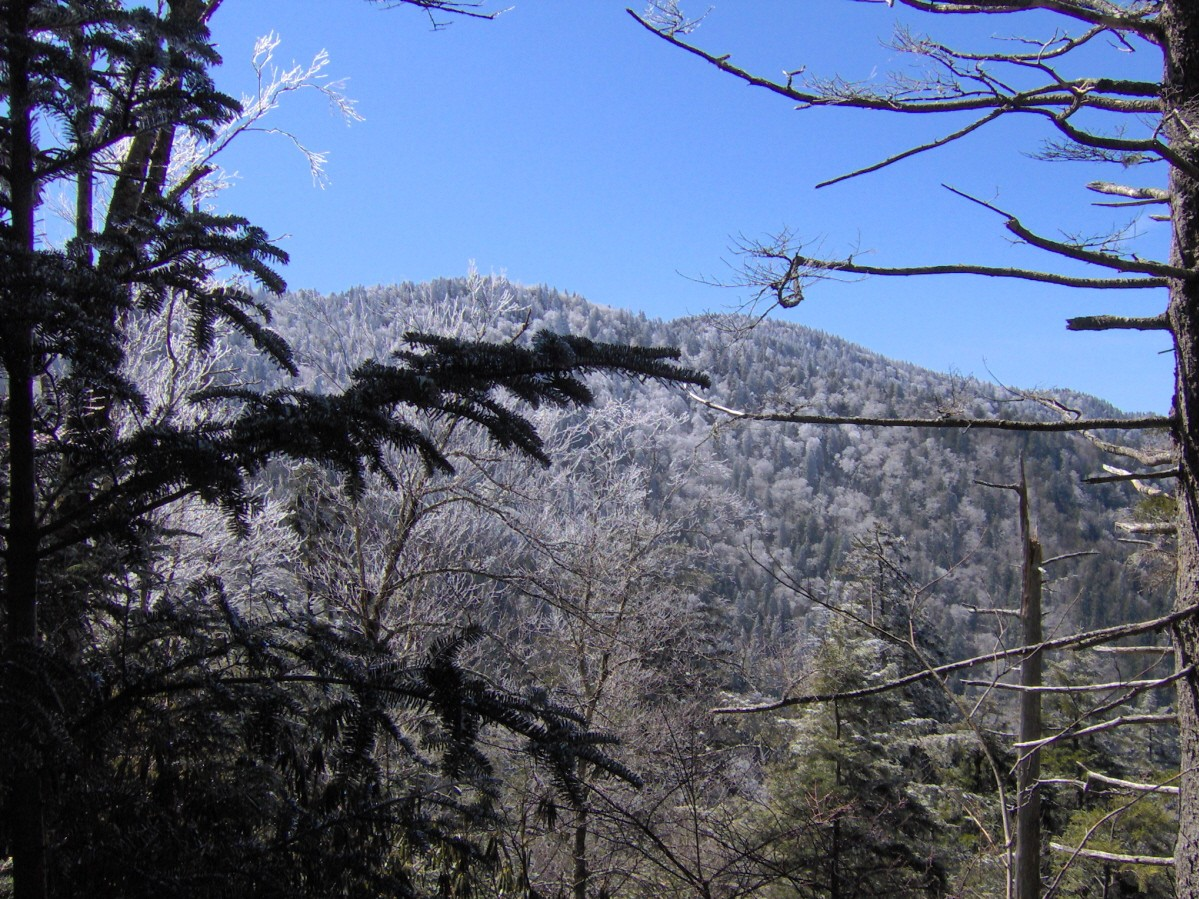
Inadu Knob and Old Black, viewed from just past the Maddron Bald Trail junction

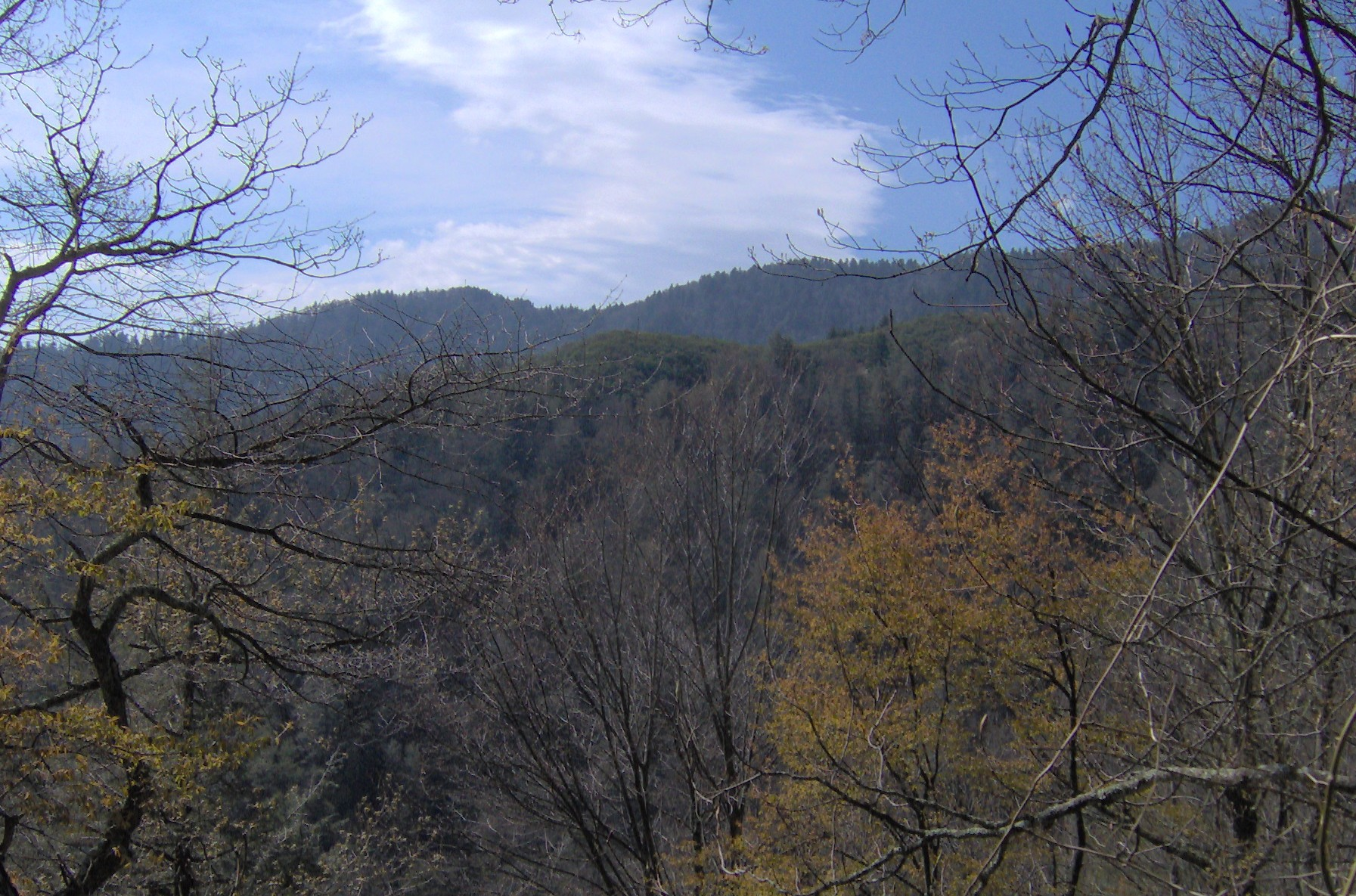
View of Camel Hump Ridge from the Snake Den Ridge Trail

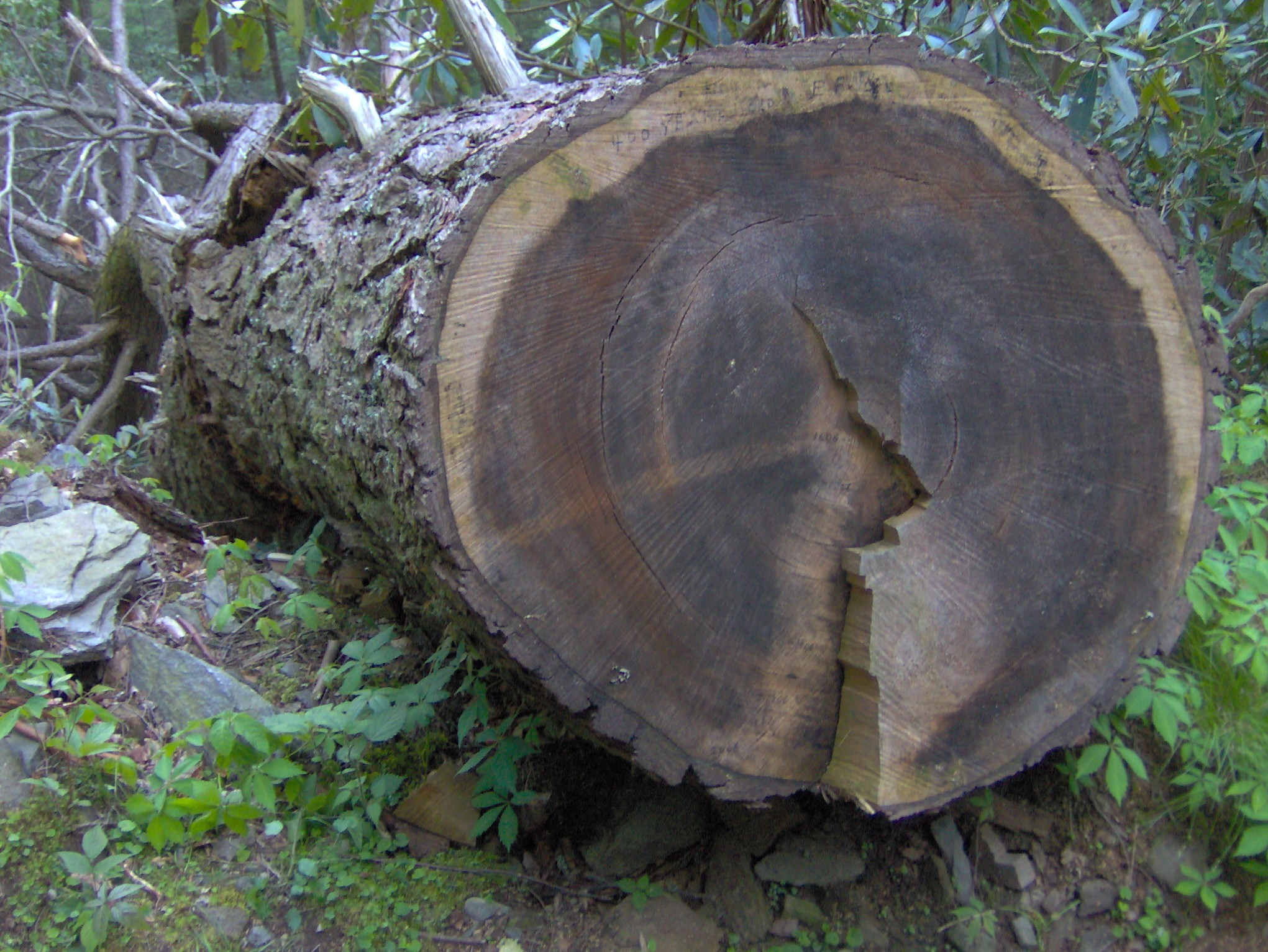
Trunk of a 400-year-old tree, near the Inadu Creek crossing

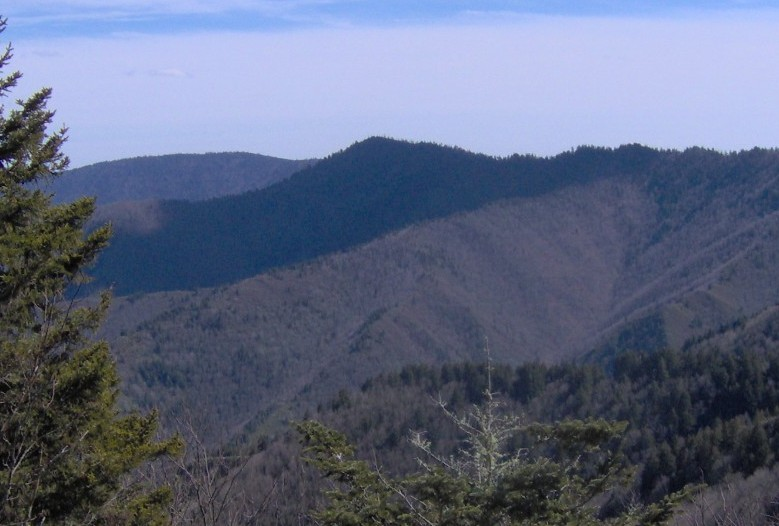
Luftee Knob, viewed from the A.T. just west of the Snake Den Ridge junction

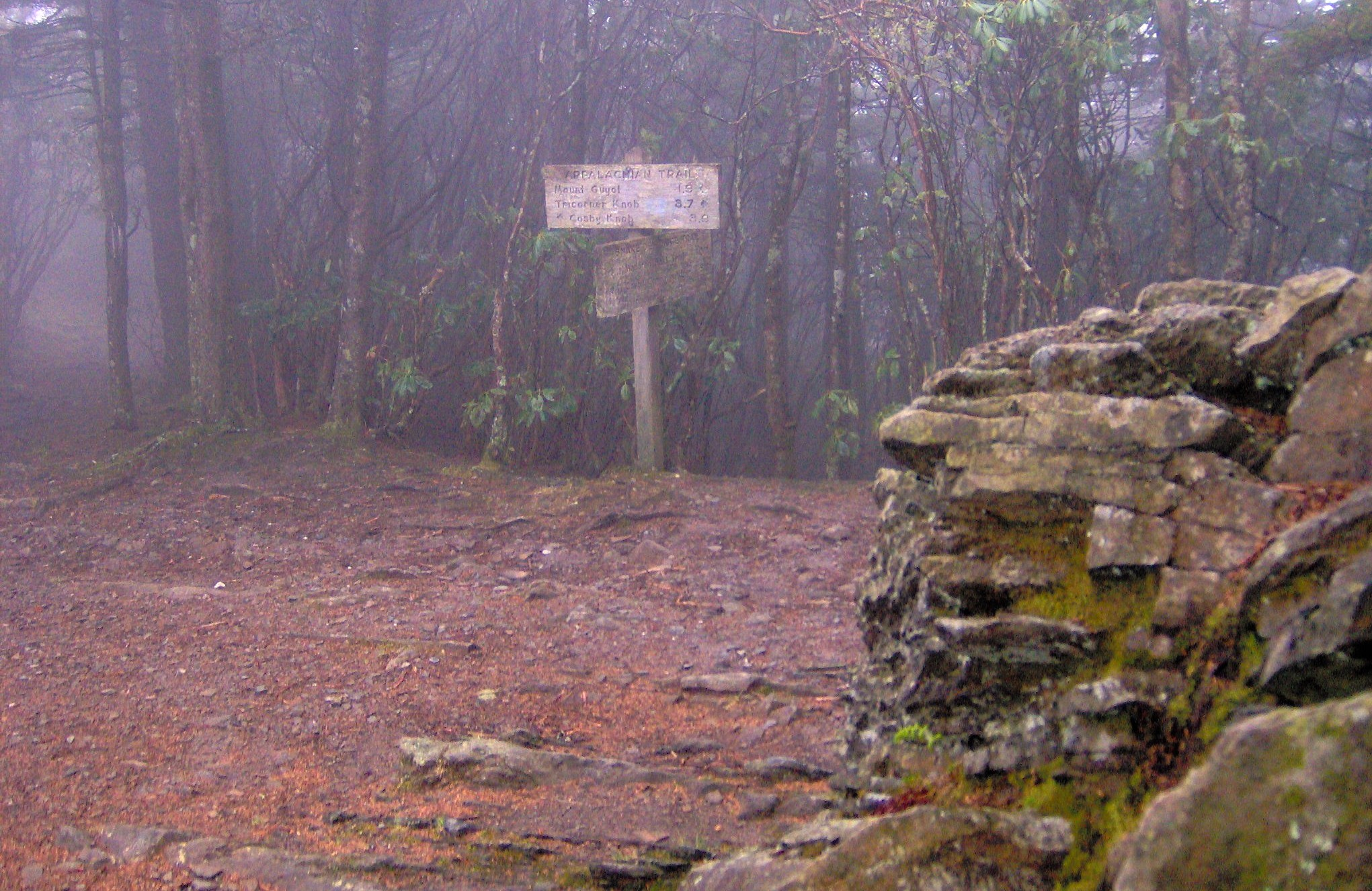
The Snake Den Ridge Trail/Appalachian Trail junction near Inadu Knob

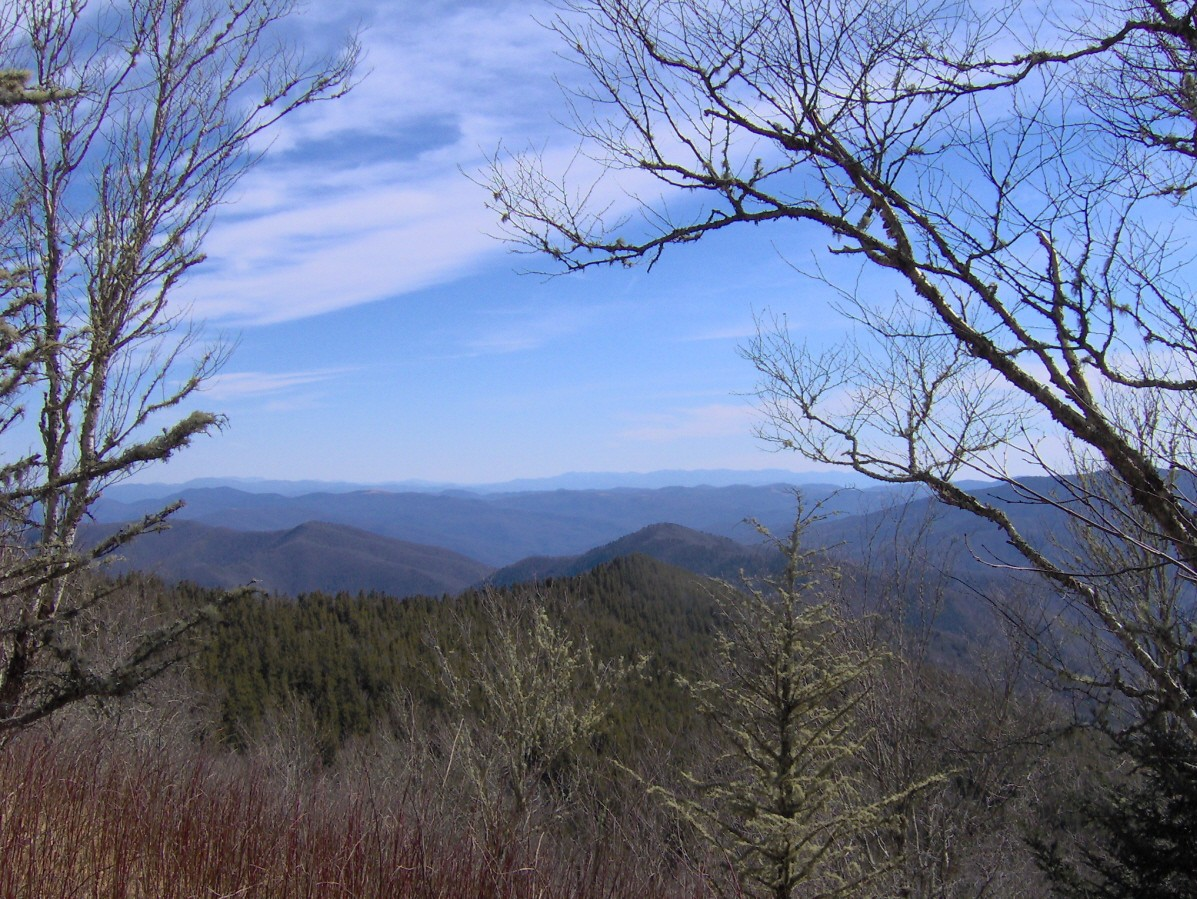
View from the Snake Den Ridge Trail/Appalachian Trail junction
