= Southern Appalachian spruce–fir forest =

Ecoregion of the southern Appalachian Mountains of the eastern United States

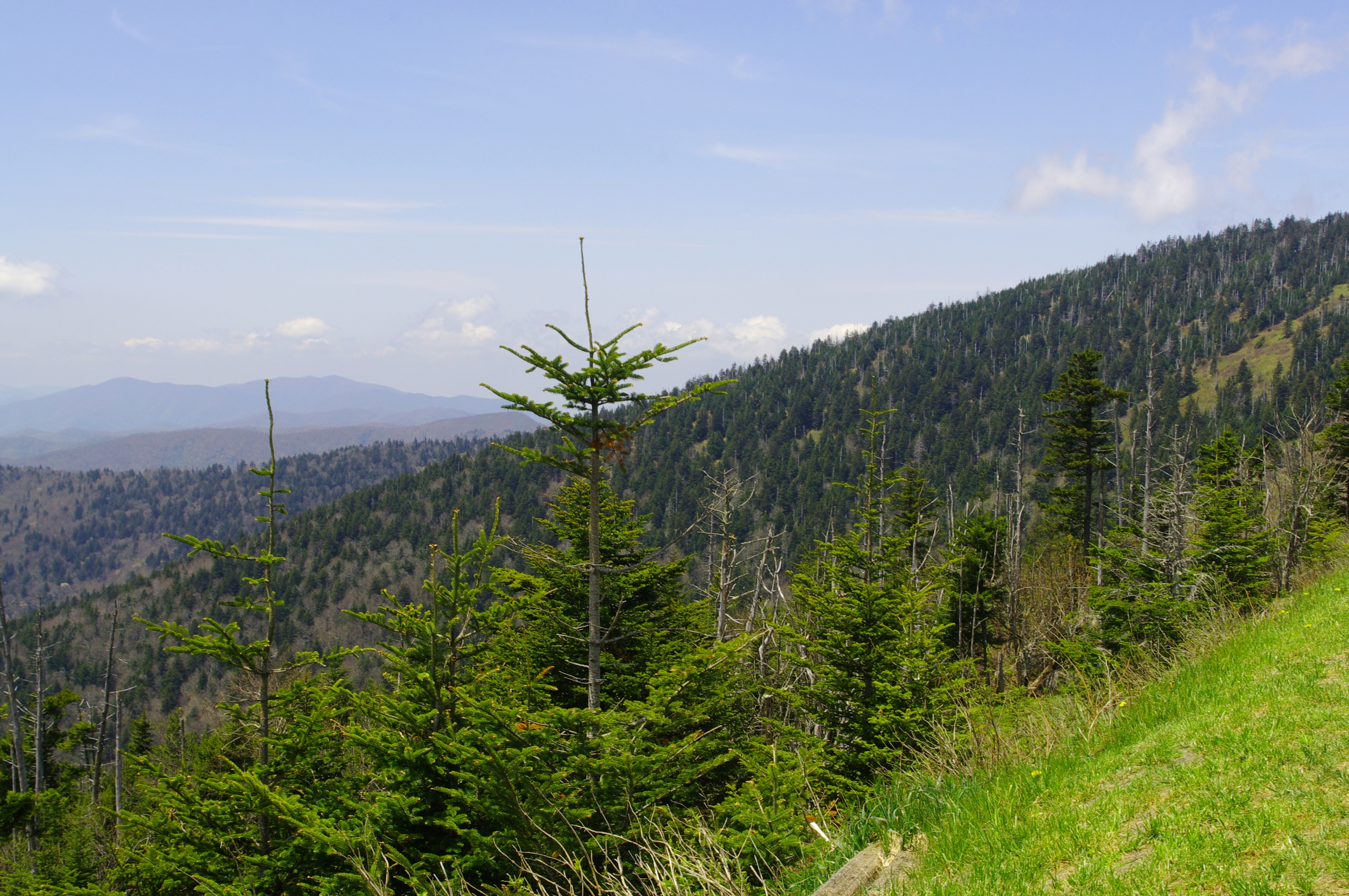
Spruce–fir on the slopes of Kuwohi

The southern Appalachian spruce–fir forest is an ecoregion of the temperate coniferous forest biome, a type of montane coniferous forest that grows in the highest elevations in the southern Appalachian Mountains of the eastern United States. The ecoregion is the highest and coldest forest type in the southern Appalachian range, thriving in elevations above 5,500 feet (1,700 m) where the climate is too harsh to support the broad-leaved hardwood forest that dominates the region's lower elevations. A relict of the last Ice Age, this forest type covers just over 100 square miles (260 km^{2}) and is considered to be among the most endangered ecosystems in the United States.

Southern spruce–fir stands consist primarily of two needle-leaved evergreen species—the red spruce and the Fraser fir, nicknamed the "he-balsam" and "she-balsam," respectively. Regional entities sometimes refer to the southern spruce–fir forest as the "Canadian" or "boreal" forest because of its resemblance to the boreal forest of Canada. While southern spruce–fir forests are similar to the boreal forests and are home to many plant and animal species that are more common at northern latitudes, the southern spruce–fir is nevertheless a disjunct and unique ecosystem.

Over the past two centuries, the southern spruce–fir stands have been decimated by logging, pollution, and an infestation of invasive insects. The southern spruce–fir forest is home to an endangered species, the spruce–fir moss spider, and several threatened species. While red spruce is common throughout North America, the Fraser fir—a relative of the balsam fir—is found only in the spruce–fir stands of southern Appalachia. In the second half of the 20th century, nearly all of the mature Fraser firs were killed off by the balsam woolly adelgid—a parasite introduced from Europe around 1900.

== Occurrence ==
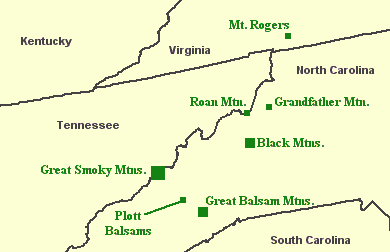
Major stands of southern Appalachian spruce–fir forest

The southern Appalachian spruce–fir forest consists of several stands covering a combined area of between 60,000 and 70,000 acres (24,000 and 28,000 ha), although less conservative estimates have placed the forest's coverage at around 90,000 acres (36,000 ha). The largest southern spruce–fir stand is located in the higher elevations of the Great Smoky Mountains on the Tennessee-North Carolina border, stretching from roughly Kuwohi in the west to Mount Guyot in the east. Another significant spruce–fir stand is found atop the Black Mountains, and includes a large stand atop Mount Mitchell. Other significant stands are found in the Great Balsam Mountains (in southern North Carolina) and the Plott Balsams (between the Great Balsams and the Great Smokies). The Great Craggy Mountains and Mount Pisgah contain stands of red spruce but lack Fraser firs.

Further north, southern spruce–fir forests coat the upper elevations of Roan Mountain, particularly the western part of the mountain between Roan High Knob and Roan High Bluff, and a smaller stand covers part of nearby Grandfather Mountain. The northernmost southern spruce–fir stand of note is found atop Mount Rogers and adjacent summits in Southwest Virginia. Smaller pockets of spruce forest have been identified in the higher elevations of West Virginia, although these are devoid of Fraser firs and are typically considered disjunct from the highland spruce–fir community.

Roughly 95 percent of existing southern spruce–fir stands are owned by federal and state entities, with the remaining 5 percent privately owned. Approximately 85 percent of southern spruce–fir stands are found on National Park Service lands, namely in the Great Smoky Mountains National Park and in the Blue Ridge Parkway corridor, or on state-owned lands, such as at Mount Mitchell State Park or Grayson Highlands State Park. The remaining 10 percent of publicly owned southern spruce–fir stands are located on lands controlled by the United States Forest Service, namely the Pisgah National Forest in North Carolina, the Cherokee National Forest in Tennessee, and the Jefferson National Forest in Virginia.

== Ecology ==
=== Climate ===
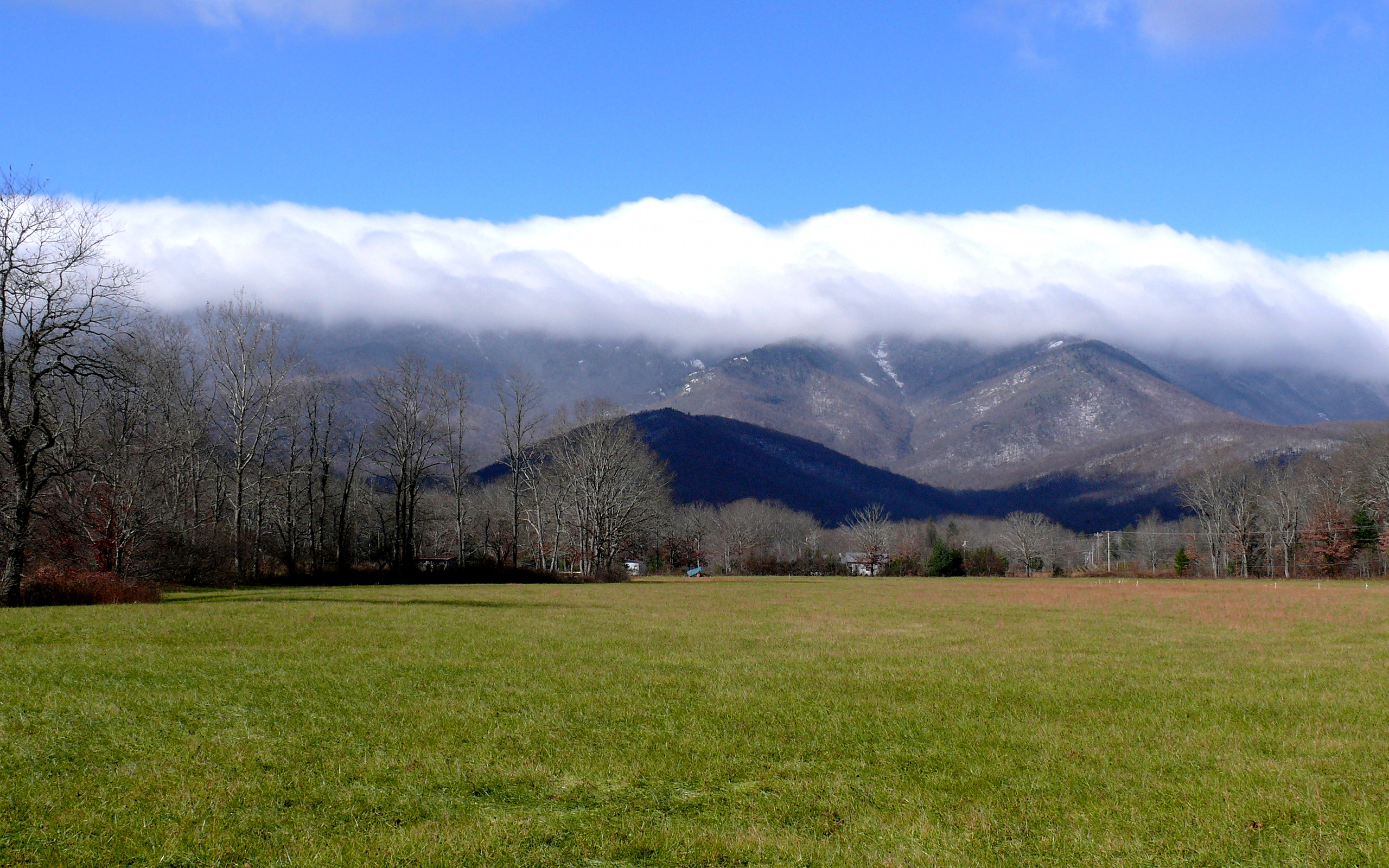
Orographic fog over the Black Mountains

Southern Appalachian spruce–fir zones are on average much cooler than their surrounding valleys. Winter temperatures can reach as low as −30 °F (−34 °C) and can feel much colder if wind chill is taken into account. Strong thunderstorms and heavy rain showers are not uncommon in summertime, and spruce–fir zones are draped in clouds up to 25% of the time. They represent the southernmost extent of the humid continental climate in North America.

Being atop mountain summits or ridgecrests, southern spruce–fir forests are often subjected to hurricane-force winds, the strongest of which have been recorded at 175 miles (282 km) per hour. Spruce–fir forest floors are often littered with blowdowns, and roads and trails that traverse spruce–fir forests require frequent maintenance to remove downed trees and branches.

=== Flora ===
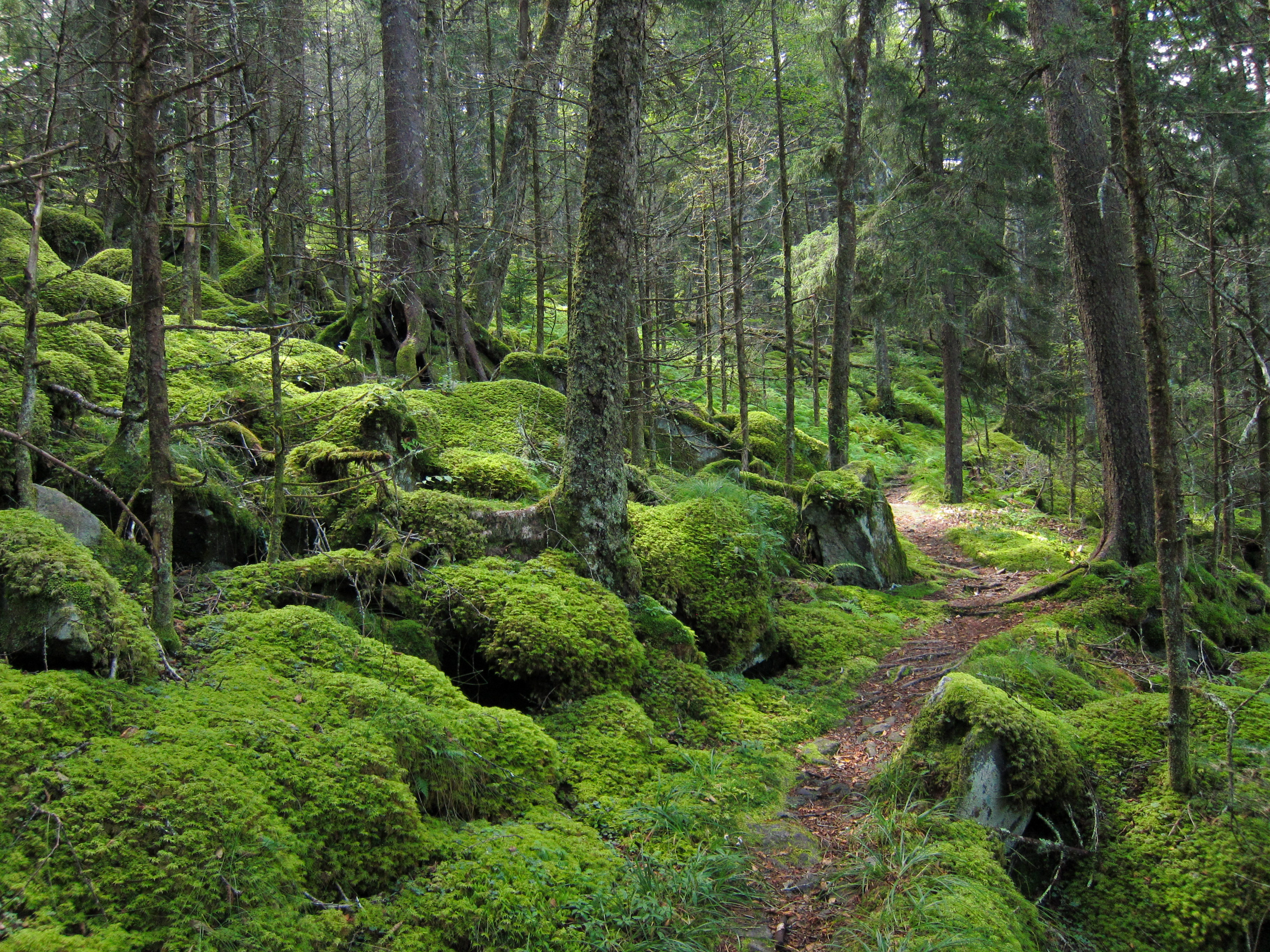
Mosses dominate the spruce–fir understory near the summit of Mount Sterling in the Great Smoky Mountains.

Red spruce and Fraser fir survive at the highest elevations in southern Appalachia due to their ability to bear climatic conditions that are too extreme for most broad-leaved trees. Both have conical shapes and flexible branches that make it less likely they will collapse under the weight of heavy snowfall, and both have a fatty substance in their needles that protects them from extreme cold. Red spruce occurs as low as 3,500 feet (1,100 m) and normally becomes the dominant tree type at 5,500 ft (1,700 m). Fraser fir appears at 5,500 feet and becomes the dominant tree type at 6,200 ft (1,900 m). The two trees can be distinguished by their needles and cones, with Fraser firs having blunt-shaped needles and upright cones and red spruces having prickly four-cornered needles and cones pointing downward. The oldest red spruces are over 300 years old, and the tallest grow to over 100 ft (30 m). The spruce–fir needles, when shed, can take up to ten years to decompose and create a relatively acidic humus layer known as "mor."

Some northern hardwoods manage to survive amidst the spruce–fir ecosystem, namely yellow birch, American mountain ash, and pin cherry, the latter being especially common in areas damaged by fire. A typical southern spruce–fir understory is home to shrubs such as Catawba rhododendron, thornless blackberry, mountain cranberry, and witch-hobble. The spruce–fir herbaceous layer contains ferns such as the mountain wood fern, northern lady fern, and clubmoss, and over 280 species of mosses. Wildflowers include Canada mayflower, blue-bead lily, and mountain wood-sorrel. The Rugels ragwort is found only in the spruce–fir forest of the Great Smoky Mountains and is one of eight plant species endemic to the southern Appalachian spruce–fir ecosystem.

=== Fauna ===
The southern Appalachian spruce–fir forests are home to the endangered spruce–fir moss spider, a tiny relative of the tarantula that lives among the forests' rich variety of mosses. Another endangered species, the northern flying squirrel, lives in the spruce–fir forests and adjacent northern hardwood stands. Southern spruce–fir forests are also the preferred habitat of the pygmy salamander, one of several salamander species endemic to southern Appalachia. Bird species found in the spruce–fir forest include winter wrens, black-capped chickadees, Blackburnian warblers, brown creepers, golden-crowned kinglets, and northern saw-whet owls, all of which are more common in northern latitudes.

=== Comparison to northern spruce–fir forests ===
While the predominance of spruce and fir gives southern spruce–fir forests a resemblance to the boreal forests of Canada and Alaska, the two predominant tree types—red spruce and Fraser fir—are not found in the boreal forests, and the Fraser fir is not found outside southern Appalachia. The typical climate of the southern Appalachian spruce–fir forest, while too extreme for most broad-leaved trees, is still warmer and wetter than Canada and Alaska, and allows for taller and faster-growing trees. The southern spruce–fir understory is also much denser and contains plants such as the Catawba rhododendron, which is absent in the north.

Soils tend to be stony medium or moderately coarse-textured inceptisols with black or dark brown topsoil becoming somewhat less dark with depth. Classic spodosol profile development with pale topsoil (E horizon) over darker subsoil is much less common than in the northern spruce–fir forest. Representative soil series include Mt. Rogers at the northern end in Virginia; Breakneck and Pullback on Kuwohi in Tennessee; Burton and Craggey on Mount Mitchell in North Carolina.

== History ==
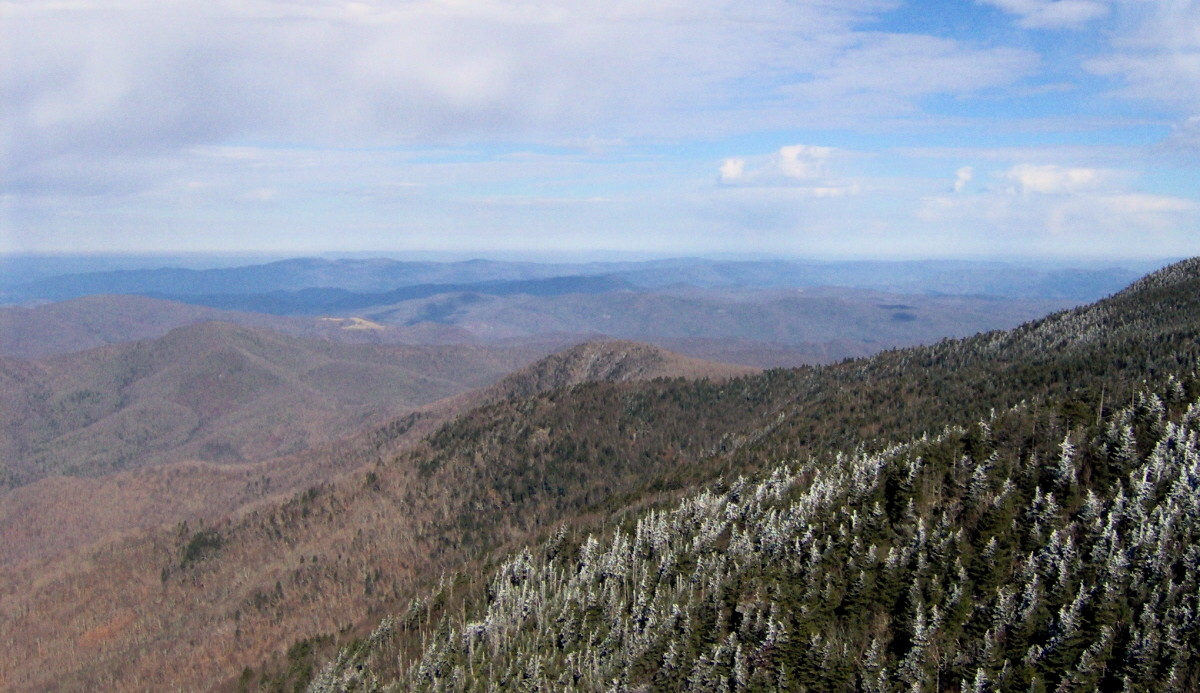
View across the slopes of Roan Mountain showing the contrast between the dark green spruce–fir canopy (right) and the dull brown deciduous winter canopy (left)

=== Natural history ===
While the expanding glaciers of the Last Glacial Period did not reach as far as the southern Appalachians, the climatic shifts which resulted in their development brought lower temperatures to the region. Approximately 18,000 years ago, when the last Ice Age reached its peak, spruce–fir forests covered much of the southeastern U.S., stretching westward to Missouri and as far south as Louisiana, while the deciduous forests were restricted to a few refuges in the coastal plains. An alpine zone—where the climate is too harsh for any trees to survive—existed in the southern Appalachians at approximately 4,950 ft (1,510 m), leaving the region's highest elevations coated with tundra vegetation and permafrost. Between 16,000 and 12,000 years ago, temperatures began warming, and the deciduous forest returned to the mountain valleys. By about 10,000 years ago, the alpine zones had disappeared, and the spruce–fir forest had retreated to the range's highest elevations.

=== Recorded history ===
Botanists such as John Bartram and André Michaux began making excursions into the diverse southern Appalachian forests as early as the late 18th century. On one such trip, Michaux was accompanied by Scottish botanist John Fraser, who discovered the fir tree that now bears his name. Early settlers gave the Fraser fir the nickname "she-balsam" because of the white blisters on the ends of its branches, which appeared to contain milk. The dark appearance of the spruce–fir canopy in contrast to the bright green canopy of the deciduous forest is the root of numerous mountain names across the southern Appalachians, most notably the Black Mountains, as well as individual summits such as Old Black in the Great Smokies. The nicknames of the red spruce and Fraser fir—he-balsam and she-balsam—also influenced the nomenclature of the southern Appalachians, leading to names such as Richland Balsam.

The general inaccessibility of the southern Appalachian highlands left the spruce–fir forests largely undisturbed for most of the 19th century, with the exception of Mount Mitchell and Roan Mountain, which became seasonal resort sites for tourists seeking an escape from hot summer temperatures. While selective logging occurred as early as the 1880s, the early 20th century saw a logging boom across the spruce–fir forests of southern Appalachia, especially during World War I, as red spruce was a preferred wood for aircraft construction. While the Great Smokies' spruce–fir zones were largely spared (with the exception of some logging around Mount Collins) due to a restraining order on logging in 1926 that preceded the creation of Great Smoky Mountains National Park, nearly half the virgin spruce elsewhere in the southern Blue Ridge Mountains was either cut or destroyed by logging-related fires. This rapid devastation led to numerous conservation movements, including one spearheaded by North Carolina Governor Locke Craig that culminated in the creation of Mount Mitchell State Park in 1915. The creation of national forests during the same period brought control to the commercial logging in the region and allowed much of the forest to begin healing.

== Environmental threats ==
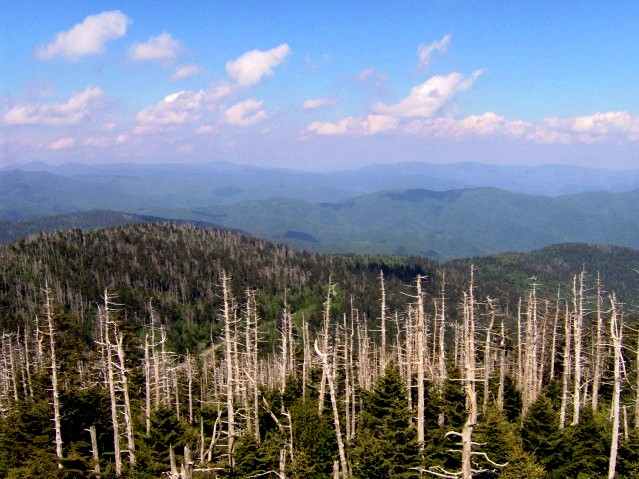
Dead Fraser fir trunks on the slopes of Kuwohi

The balsam woolly adelgid, the most noticeable threat to the southern spruce–fir forest, was introduced from Europe in the first half of the 20th century and quickly decimated the balsam fir stands in the northern Appalachians. In 1957 it was discovered atop Mount Mitchell, and by 1963 it had spread to Mount Sterling in the Great Smoky Mountains. Over the next few decades, the adelgid killed off almost all of the mature Fraser firs of southern Appalachia. While new Fraser firs live long enough to seed, most new firs are attacked and killed after just a few years. Attempts to exterminate the insect by introducing species known to prey on it have largely failed. Fraser fir repopulation efforts are further complicated by the fact that the fir's cones are prized by tree growers (especially Christmas tree growers), and the United States Forest Service is under constant pressure to allow cone collecting.

The demise of the mature Fraser firs has had a drastic impact on the southern spruce–fir ecosystem. The spruce–fir moss spider, which prefers mosses that thrive in the cool shade beneath the mature firs, is believed to be extirpated in all but a few places in North Carolina. The red spruce, likewise, which is easily damaged by high winds, depends on the sturdier Fraser firs for protection in the wind-blasted higher elevations. Air pollution and acid rain are also believed to be stunting the growth of red spruces (especially since the spruce–fir zones are often immersed in clouds), although to what extent is debatable. Anthropogenic factors, such as global warming and air pollution, are difficult to separate from natural causes in regional dieoffs of red spruce in the northeast and declining growth in the south.

A study of the Great Smoky Mountains showed the number of adult firs has increased over 30 years, with Kuwohi having three times as many adult trees as of 2020 as in the 1980s.

== Access ==
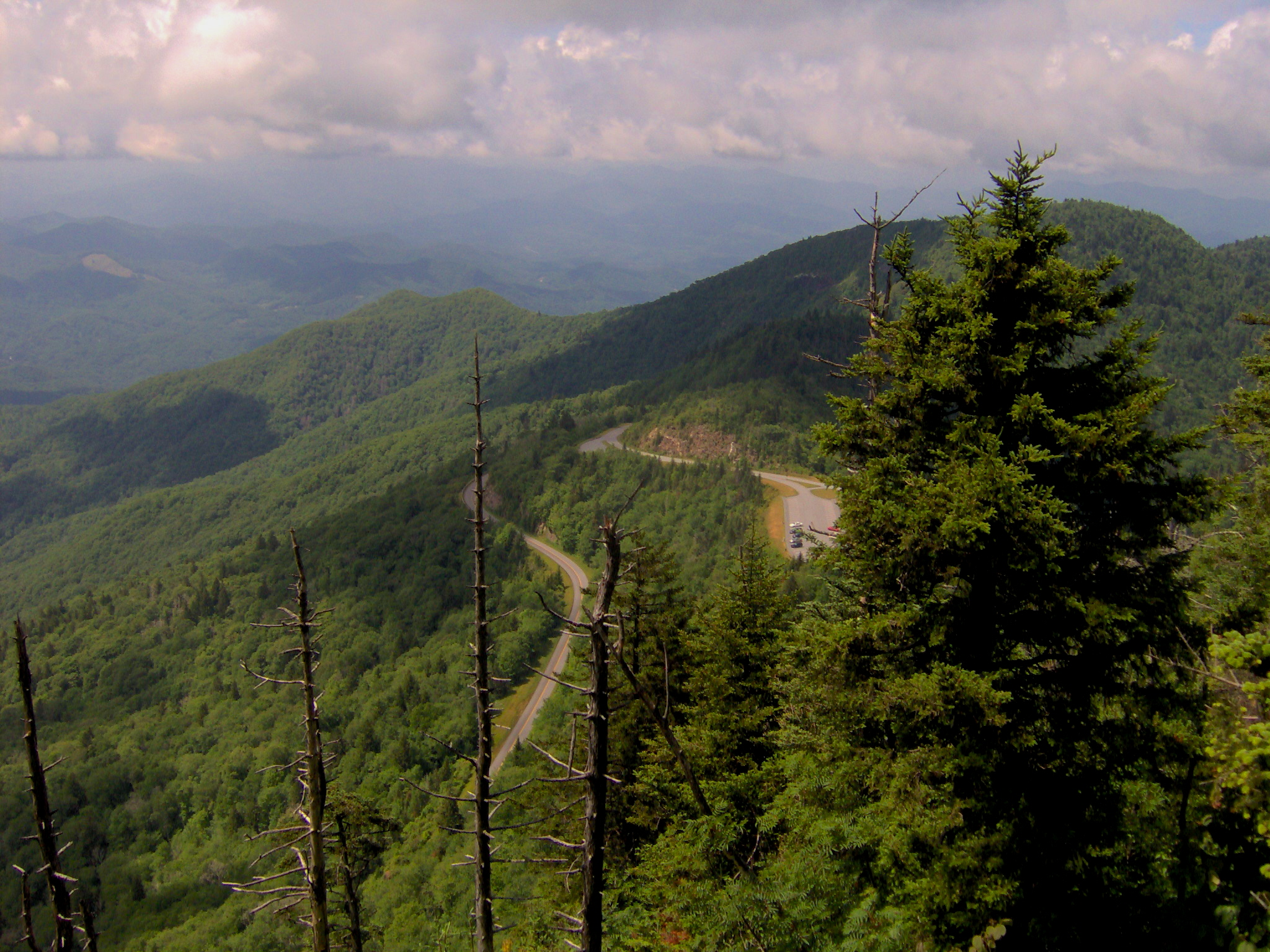
The Blue Ridge Parkway viewed from the summit of Waterrock Knob.

In spite of their general remoteness, most southern spruce–fir forests are accessible via federal and state highways. The Blue Ridge Parkway passes through the spruce–fir regions in the Plott Balsams, the Great Balsams, the Black Mountains (N.C. State Highway 128 connects the parkway to Mount Mitchell), and on Grandfather Mountain. In the Great Smoky Mountains National Park, U.S. Route 441 climbs to Newfound Gap amidst the Great Smokies spruce–fir stand, where it intersects the 7-mile (11 km) Kuwohi Road. The Roan Mountain spruce–fir stand is accessed via state highway—designated as Highway 143 in Tennessee and Highway 261 in North Carolina—and a paved road accesses the gap between Roan High Knob and Roan High Bluff, where there is a large rhododendron garden.

The Appalachian Trail traverses the southern spruce–fir forests in the Great Smokies and atop Roan Mountain and Mount Rogers. Other major trails in the southern spruce–fir zone include the Deep Gap Trail in the Black Mountains and the Balsam Mountain Trail and The Boulevard Trail in the Great Smokies. Smaller trails (part of the Blue Ridge Parkway corridor) access the summits of Waterrock Knob in the Plott Balsams and Richland Balsam in the Great Balsams.

== See also ==
- Appalachian balds
- Appalachian temperate rainforest
- Cove (Appalachian Mountains)
- List of ecoregions in the United States (WWF)
