= Mount Guyot (Great Smoky Mountains) =

Mountain in the southeastern United States

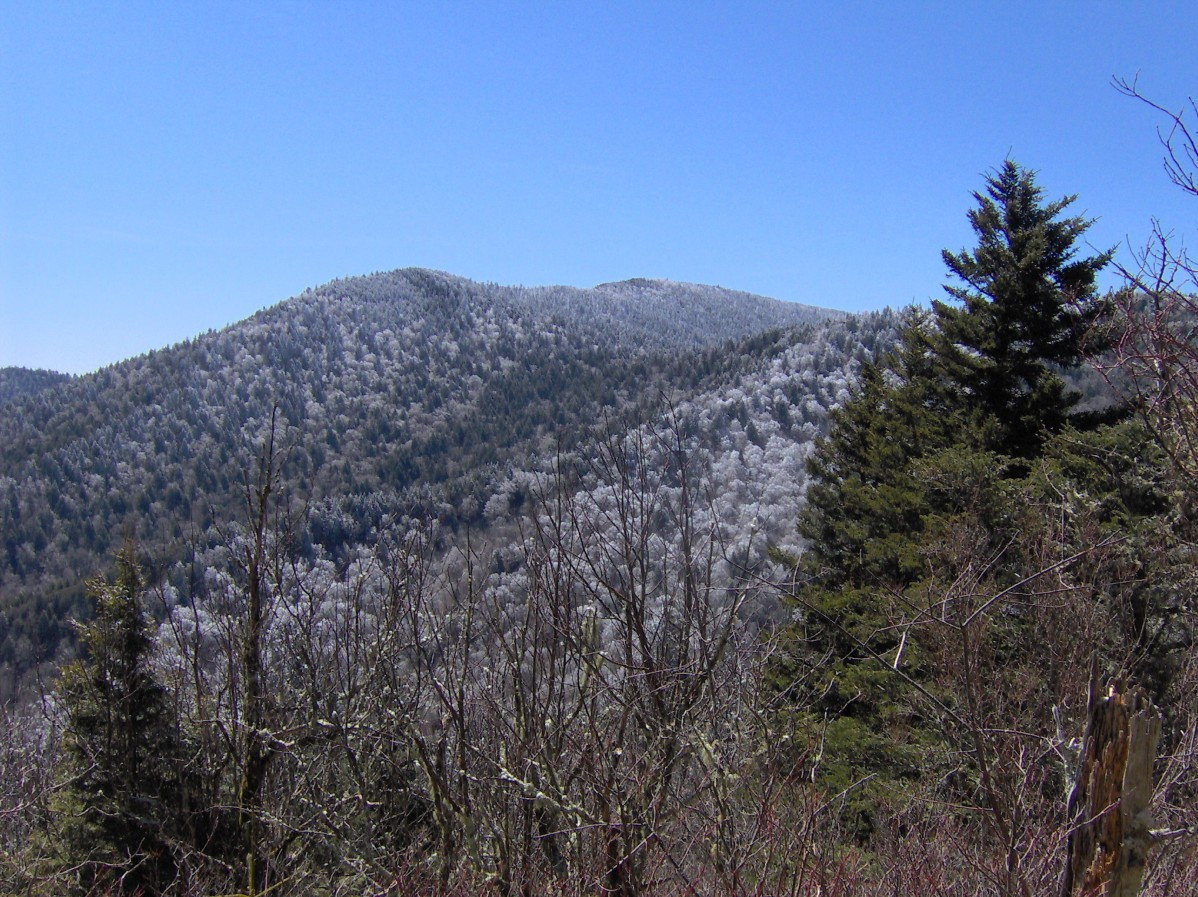
- Mt. Guyot, looking south from the Appalachian Trail

Highest point
- Elevation: 6,621 ft (2,018 m) NAVD 88
- Prominence: 1,581 ft (482 m)
- Coordinates: 35°42′19.0″N 83°15′26.9″W

Geography
- Location within North Carolina Location within Tennessee
- Location: Haywood County, North Carolina; Sevier County, Tennessee, U.S.
- Parent range: Great Smoky Mountains
- Topo map: USGS Mount Guyot

Climbing
- Easiest route: Snake Den Ridge Trail + Appalachian Trail + bushwhack

Mount Guyot is a mountain in the Great Smoky Mountains, located in the southeastern United States. At 6,621 feet (2,018 m) in elevation, Guyot is the fourth-highest summit in the Eastern U.S., and the second-highest in the Great Smoky Mountains National Park. While the mountain is remote, the Appalachian Trail crosses its south slope, passing to within 1,000 feet (300 m) of the summit.

Mount Guyot lies on the Tennessee-North Carolina border, between Sevier County and Haywood County. There are two peaks atop the mountain approximately one-half mile apart, with the southwestern peak in Tennessee being the true summit. The mountain rises 3,600 feet (1,100 m) above its eastern base near Walnut Bottom and 4,000 feet (1,200 m) above its western base near Greenbrier Cove. Ramsey Cascades, one of the park's most spectacular waterfalls, spills down a sandstone cliff near the bottom of Guyot's western slope.

A dense stand of Southern Appalachian spruce-fir forest coats the summit and upper slopes of Guyot. Human settlement never expanded deep into the eastern Smokies, so the area around Guyot and adjacent peaks suffered substantially less disturbance than the mountains in the western or central parts of the range. A long hike and a challenging bushwhack are required to reach the summit, the highest in the Eastern U.S. without a trail.

== Geology ==
Mount Guyot is composed of Precambrian rocks of the Ocoee Supergroup, formed from ocean sediments approximately one billion years ago. The mountain is underlain by Thunderhead sandstone, which is common throughout the Smokies. The Thunderhead sandstone was thrust over Roaring Fork sandstone several hundred million years ago. Mt. Guyot itself was formed during the Appalachian orogeny over 200 million years ago, when the North American and African plates collided, thrusting the rock upward.

== Climate ==
Climate data for Mount Guyot 35.7060 N, 83.2561 W, Elevation: 6,171 ft (1,881 m) (1991–2020 normals)
Month	Jan	Feb	Mar	Apr	May	Jun	Jul	Aug	Sep	Oct	Nov	Dec	Year
Mean daily maximum °F (°C)	34.1 (1.2)	37.0 (2.8)	45.2 (7.3)	54.3 (12.4)	60.9 (16.1)	66.3 (19.1)	68.8 (20.4)	67.7 (19.8)	64.3 (17.9)	55.7 (13.2)	45.3 (7.4)	38.0 (3.3)	53.1 (11.7)
Daily mean °F (°C)	26.4 (−3.1)	28.7 (−1.8)	35.2 (1.8)	44.0 (6.7)	51.6 (10.9)	58.1 (14.5)	61.2 (16.2)	60.7 (15.9)	55.7 (13.2)	47.1 (8.4)	36.8 (2.7)	30.2 (−1.0)	44.6 (7.0)
Mean daily minimum °F (°C)	18.8 (−7.3)	20.5 (−6.4)	25.2 (−3.8)	33.6 (0.9)	42.3 (5.7)	49.9 (9.9)	53.7 (12.1)	53.7 (12.1)	47.1 (8.4)	38.6 (3.7)	28.3 (−2.1)	22.4 (−5.3)	36.2 (2.3)
Average precipitation inches (mm)	6.90 (175)	5.99 (152)	7.16 (182)	6.90 (175)	6.61 (168)	7.94 (202)	8.16 (207)	6.84 (174)	6.13 (156)	4.98 (126)	6.05 (154)	7.11 (181)	80.77 (2,052)
Source: PRISM Climate Group

== History ==
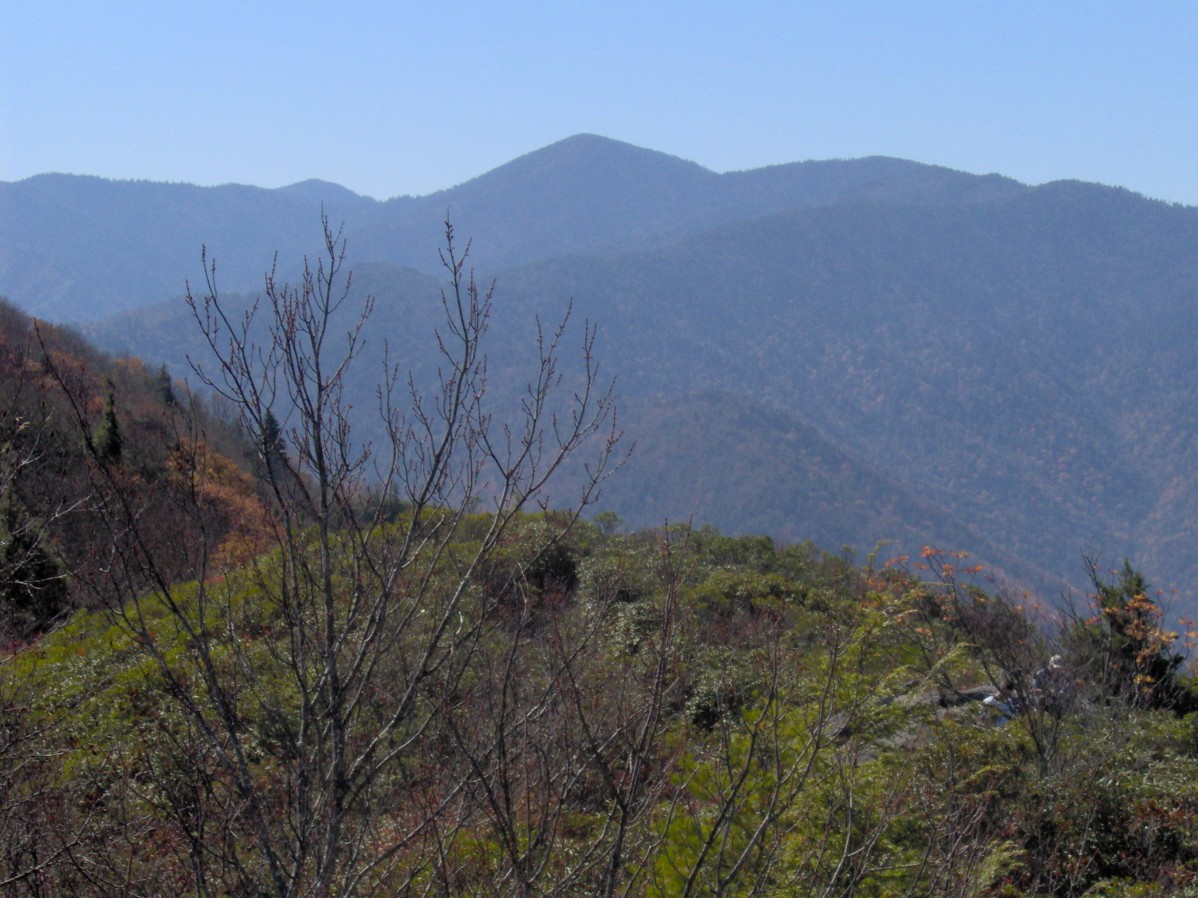
The Guyot massif, with Mt. Guyot at the center, looking west from Mt. Cammerer

Mount Guyot was named in honor of Swiss geographer Arnold Guyot by Guyot's friend, Samuel Buckley. Buckley was a naturalist who accompanied Thomas Lanier Clingman on a survey expedition to the crest of the Smokies in 1858. While Buckley's measurements were often wildly inaccurate, Guyot conducted an expedition the following year, recording more accurate elevations and giving preliminary names to various peaks along the crest. Guyot measured the elevation of Mt. Guyot at 6,636 feet (2,023 m), missing the modern measurement by just 15 feet (4.6 m).

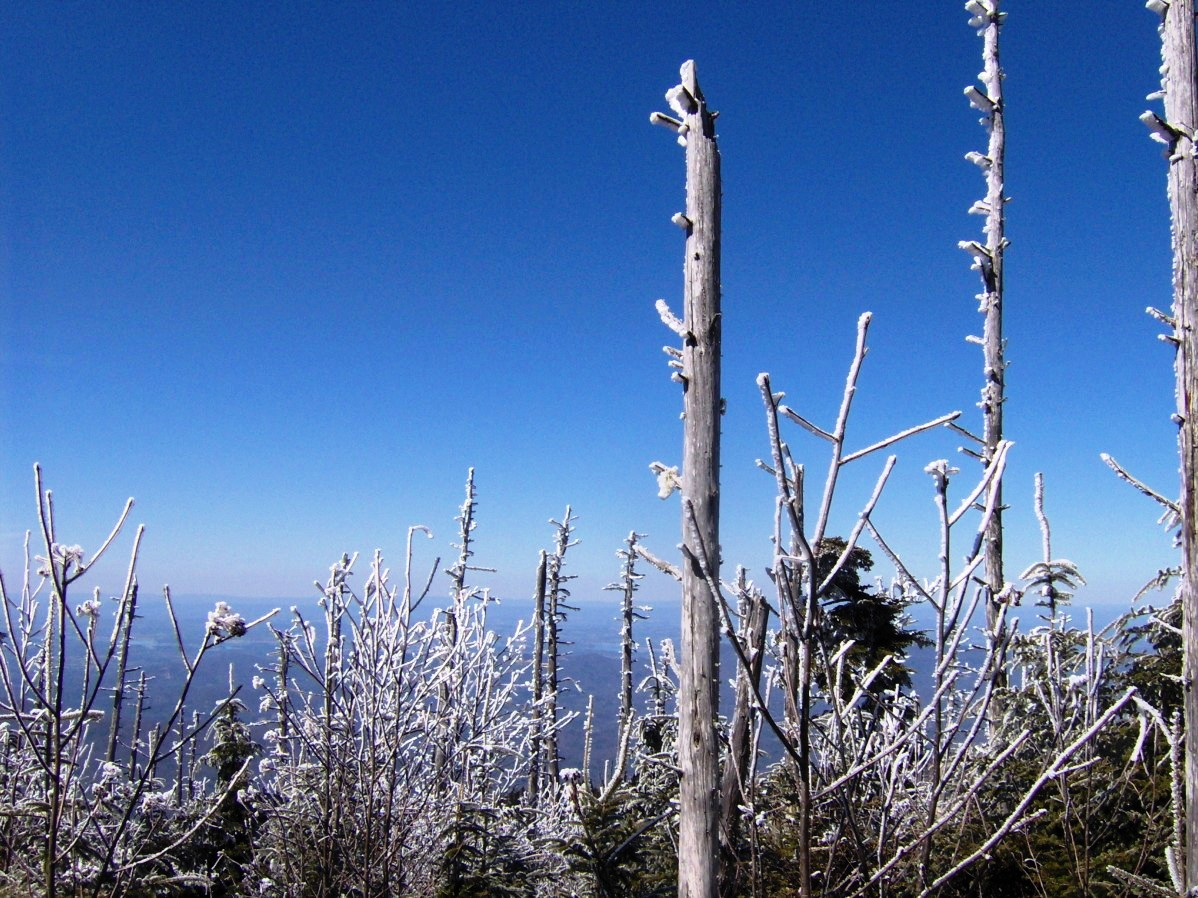
Looking northwest from a clearing at 6,600 feet (2,000 m), just off the summit of Mt. Guyot

Regarding the Eastern Smokies, surveyors and authors alike agreed on one thing: the region was very remote and isolated. Guyot said of the area, "neither the white man or the Indian hunter venture in this wilderness." For Horace Kephart, who wrote extensively on the Smoky Mountains in the early 1900s, Mt. Guyot was the climax of a dense, virtually-insurmountable wilderness:

The most rugged and difficult part of the Smokies (and of the United States east of Colorado) is in the sawtooth mountains between Collins and Guyot, at the headwaters of the Okona Lufty River. I know but few men who have ever followed this part of the divide ...

Kephart goes on to relate the account of James Ferris and his wife, two naturalists who bushwhacked their way across the crest of the Smokies to Mt. Guyot in 1900. According to Mrs. Ferris:

The Tennesseeans seem afraid of the mountains, and the Cherokees of North Carolina equally so; for, two miles (3 km) from camp, all traces of man, except surveyors' marks, had disappeared.

Mt. Guyot remained isolated until the Civilian Conservation Corps constructed a segment of the Appalachian Trail across the mountain's western slope in 1935. Although the trail opened up the heart of the Eastern Smokies to backpackers, access remained relatively difficult. According to author Laura Thornborough, who climbed Guyot in the late 1930s:

My first of three trips to the top of Mt. Guyot remains sharply etched in my memory. It was the hardest, roughest and most exhausting of all the trips I have ever made in the Great Smokies.

Thornborough followed the route out of Greenbrier that ascends Guyot's western slope. She recalls that "there was no trail to Guyot, not even a dim one, but our guides knew the way." The party followed Ramsay Prong until it became "a mere trickle of water," and emerged near modern-day Guyot Spring. From the state line, they found a "dim trail" leading to the summit. Thornborough concludes her report by saying, "if it is wilderness you want, then go to Guyot."

== Access ==
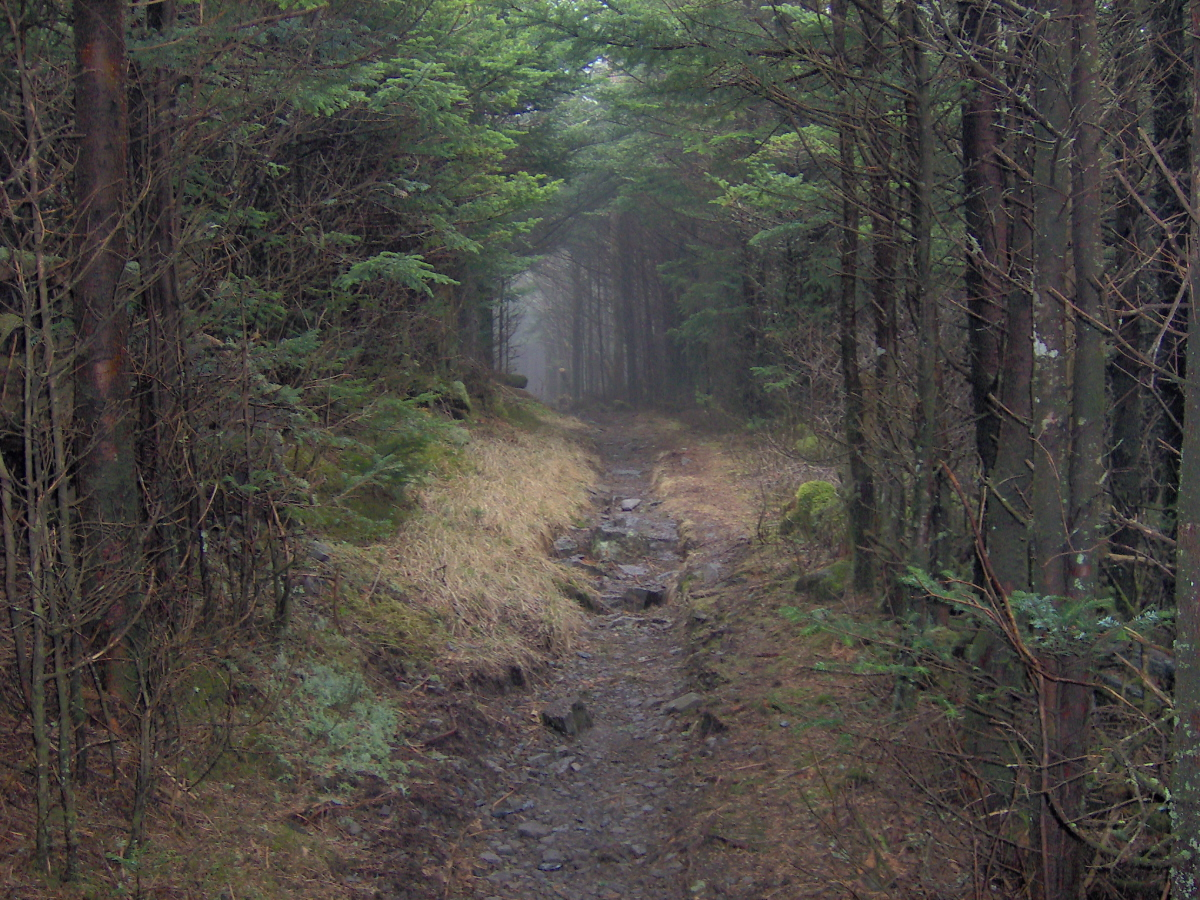
The dense forest of the Eastern Smokies renders the Appalachian Trail a virtual tunnel as it crosses the western slope of Mount Guyot

The Appalachian Trail and the Balsam Mountain Trail intersect just south of Guyot at Tricorner Knob. They are the only maintained trails to traverse the mountain.

From the Cosby Campground (specifically behind Campsite B51), the Snake Den Ridge Trail winds 5.3 miles (8.5 km) to its intersection with the Appalachian Trail at Inadu Knob. From this intersection, it is approximately 2 miles (3.2 km) to Guyot Spring, on Mt. Guyot's west slope.

A 15-mile (24 km) section of the Appalachian Trail stretches from Newfound Gap to Tricorner Knob, near Guyot's south slope. The Appalachian-Balsam Trail intersection is approximately 13 miles (21 km) from Balsam Mountain Road, a gravel road that begins near Cherokee, North Carolina.

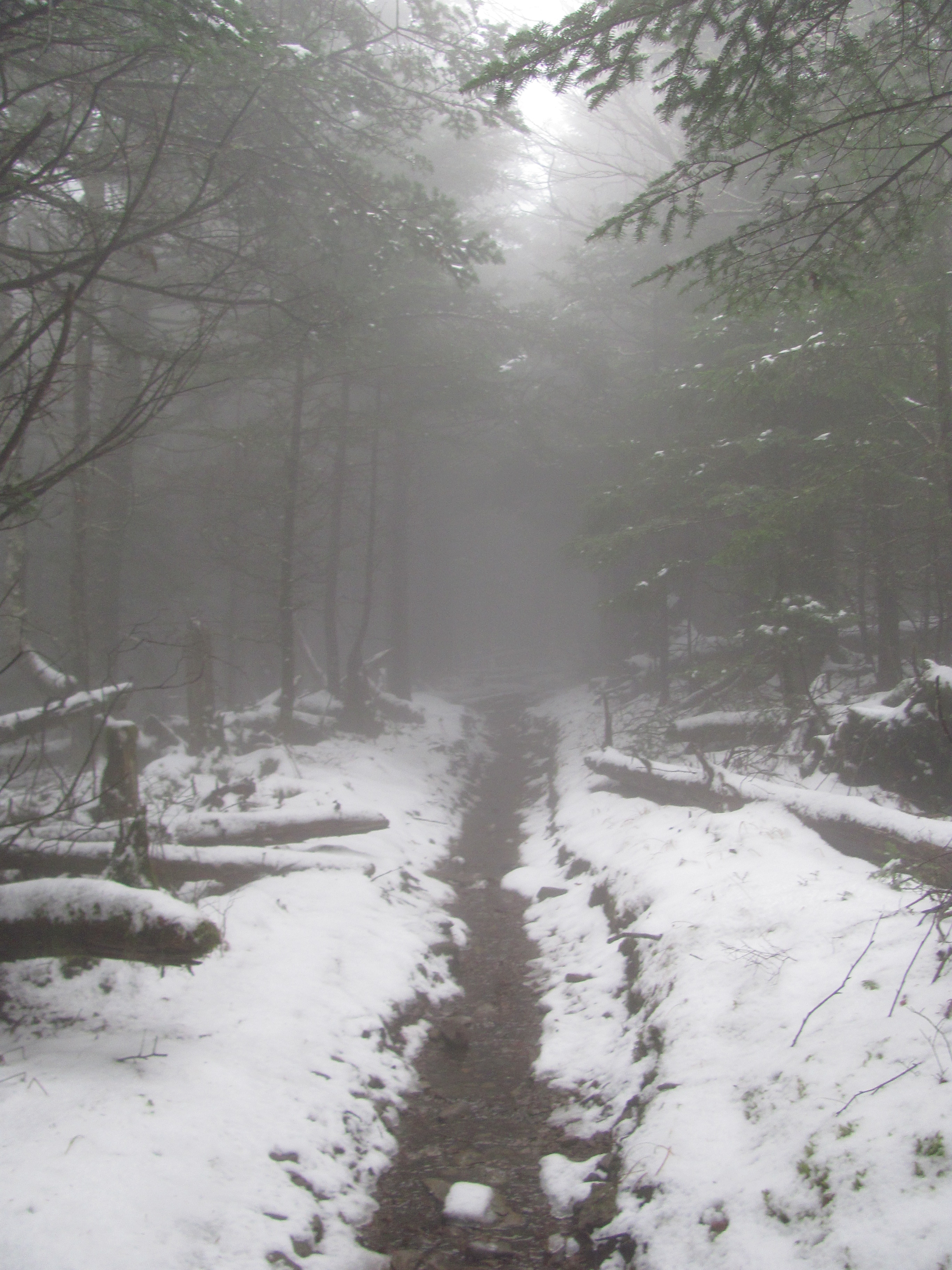
Mount Guyot; Foggy and Lonely Appalachian Trail

While Guyot's eastern slope is very steep, its western slope, known as Guyot Spur, descends gradually for nearly five miles to the Little Pigeon River. A well-known bushwhack follows the creek on the north side of Guyot Spur, starting at Ramsay Cascades and emerging on the Appalachian Trail near Guyot Spring (probably the same path Thornborough's guides followed in the 1930s). This route is approximately eight miles from the Ramsay Cascades Trail parking area, four miles (6 km) of which are maintained trail.

While the summit is less than a half-mile from the Appalachian Trail, the thick forest makes any bushwhack a challenge. A faint manway rises from Guyot Spring to the northern summit, although the manway is heavily overgrown. Dead Fraser fir blowdowns and low visibility complicate navigation from any direction.

The Appalachian Trail also passes by another Mount Guyot in New Hampshire approximately 1600 miles to the north.
