= Blackstock =

Blackstock may refer to:

== Places ==
- Blackstock, Ontario, Canada
- Blackstock Road, major road in north London, United Kingdom
- Blackstock, South Carolina, United States

== Other uses ==
- Blackstock (surname)
- Battle of Blackstock's Farm (1780), took place in what today is Union County, South Carolina, United States
- Blackstock Knob, a summit in the Black Mountains, North Carolina, United States

== See also ==
- Blacklock, a surname
- Blacksocks, a European sock subscription service
