= Blue Ridge Mountains =

Mountain range in the Eastern U.S.

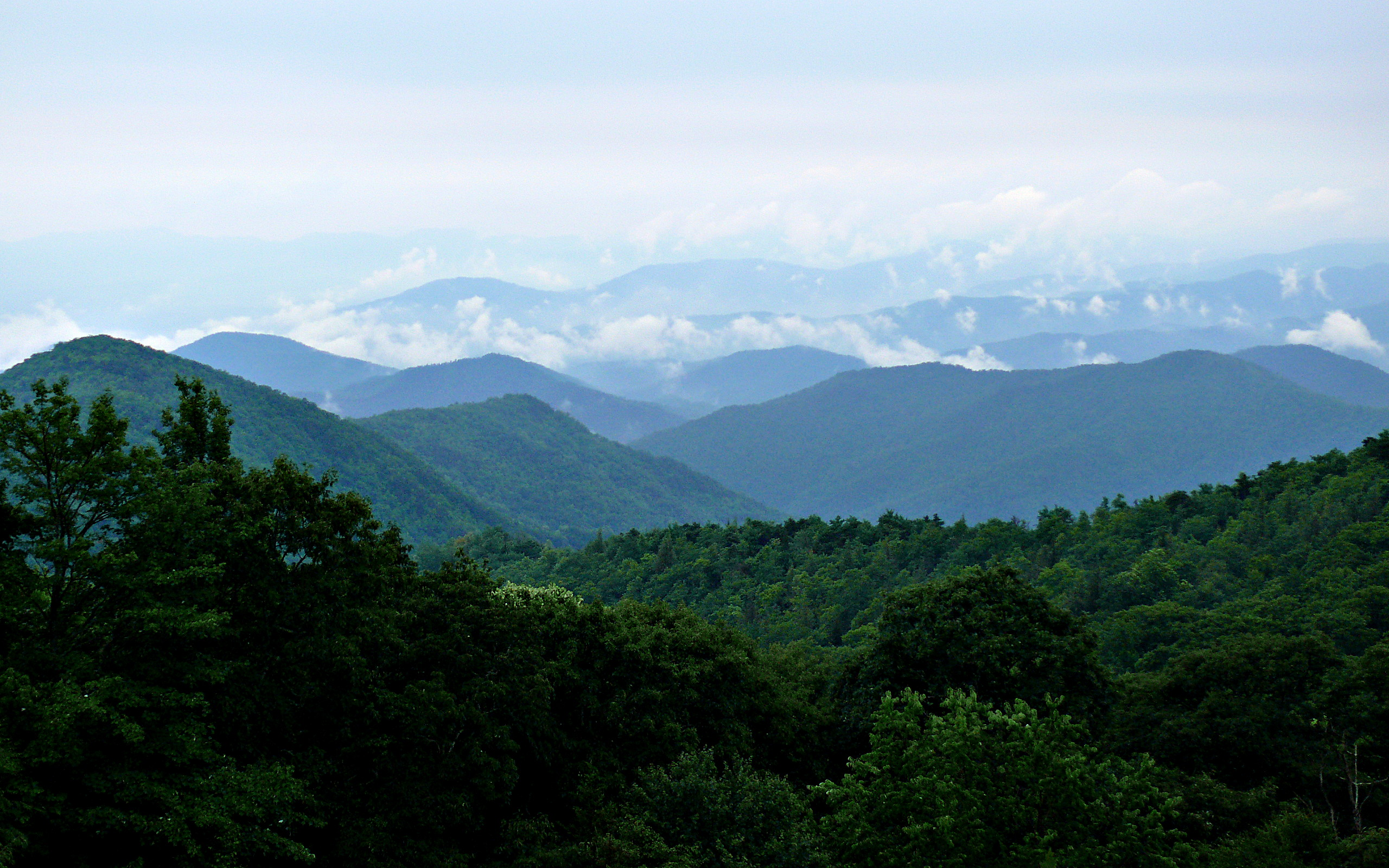
- The Blue Ridge Mountains as seen from the Blue Ridge Parkway near Mount Mitchell in North Carolina

Highest point
- Peak: Mount Mitchell
- Elevation: 6,684 ft (2,037 m)
- Coordinates: 35°45′53″N 82°15′55″W

Geography
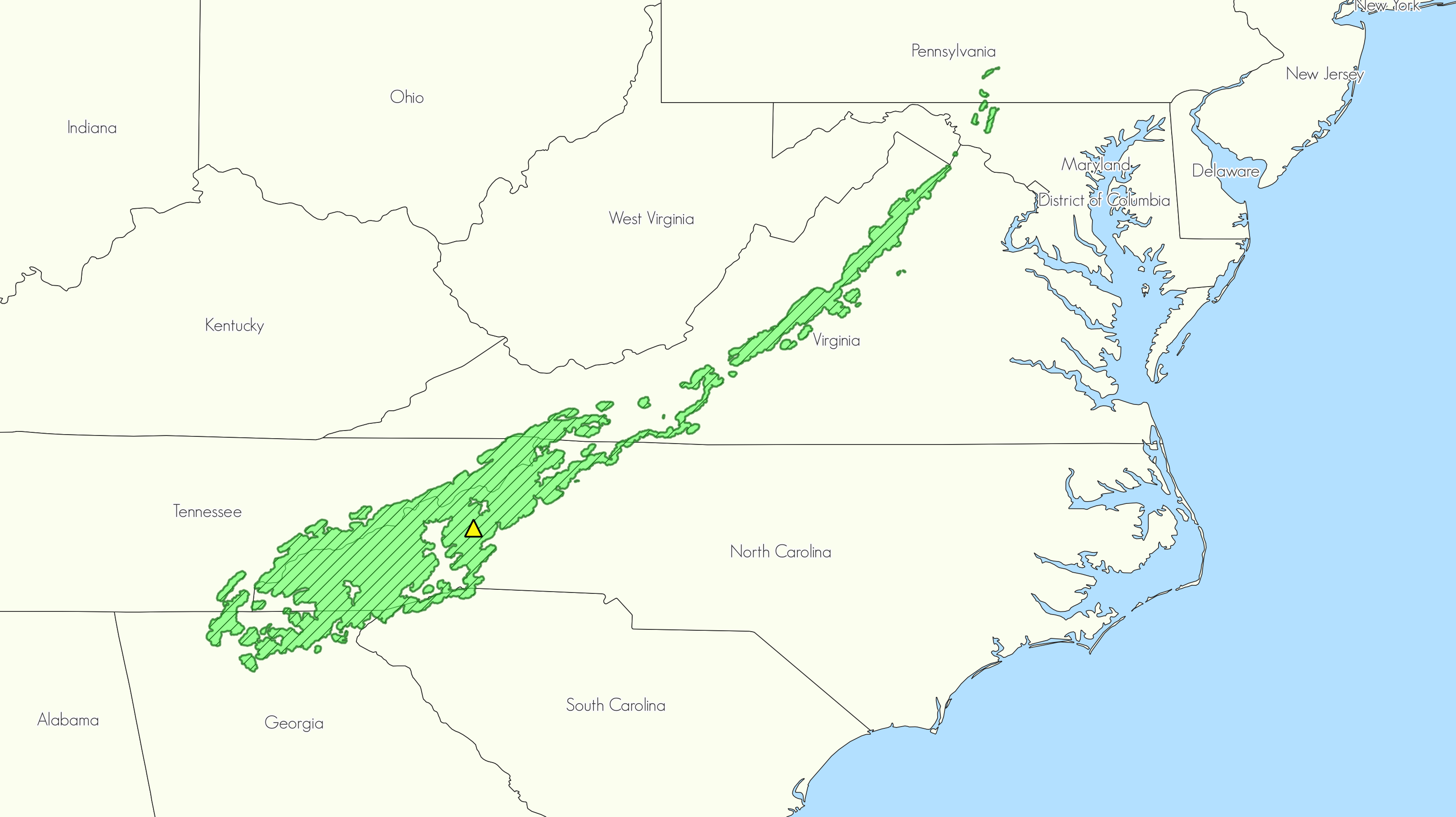
- Locator map of the mountain range with state borders
- Country: United States
- States: North Carolina; Virginia; Tennessee; Maryland; Pennsylvania; South Carolina; Georgia; West Virginia
- Region: Appalachia
- Largest settlement: Roanoke
- Parent range: Appalachian Mountains

Geology
- Orogeny: Grenville orogeny
- Rock types: granite; gneiss; limestone

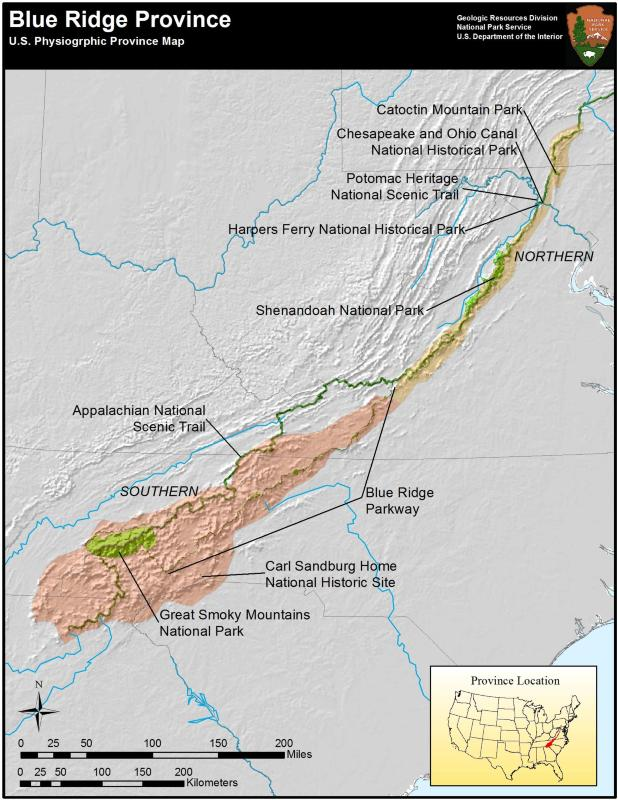
Map of the Blue Ridge Province section that formed 1.2 bya

The Blue Ridge Mountains (Cherokee: ᏌᎪᏂᎨ ᏣᎴᎩ, Sagonige Tsalegi, "blue mountain ridge") are a physiographic province of the larger Appalachian Highlands range. The mountain range is located in the Eastern United States and extends 550 miles (885 km) southwest from southern Pennsylvania through Maryland, West Virginia, Virginia, North Carolina, South Carolina, Tennessee, and Georgia. The province consists of northern and southern physiographic regions, which divide near the Roanoke River gap. To the west of the Blue Ridge, between it and the bulk of the Appalachians, lies the Great Appalachian Valley, bordered on the west by the Ridge and Valley province of the Appalachian range.

The Blue Ridge Mountains are known for having a bluish color when seen from a distance. Trees put the "blue" in Blue Ridge, from the isoprene released into the atmosphere. This contributes to the characteristic haze on the mountains and their perceived color.

Within the Blue Ridge province are two major national parks: Shenandoah National Park in the northern section and Great Smoky Mountains National Park in the southern section. The Blue Ridge Parkway, a 469-mile (755 km) long scenic highway, connects the two parks and runs along the ridge crest-lines, as does the Appalachian Trail. Eight national forests include George Washington and Jefferson, Cherokee, Pisgah, Nantahala and Chattahoochee.

== Geography ==
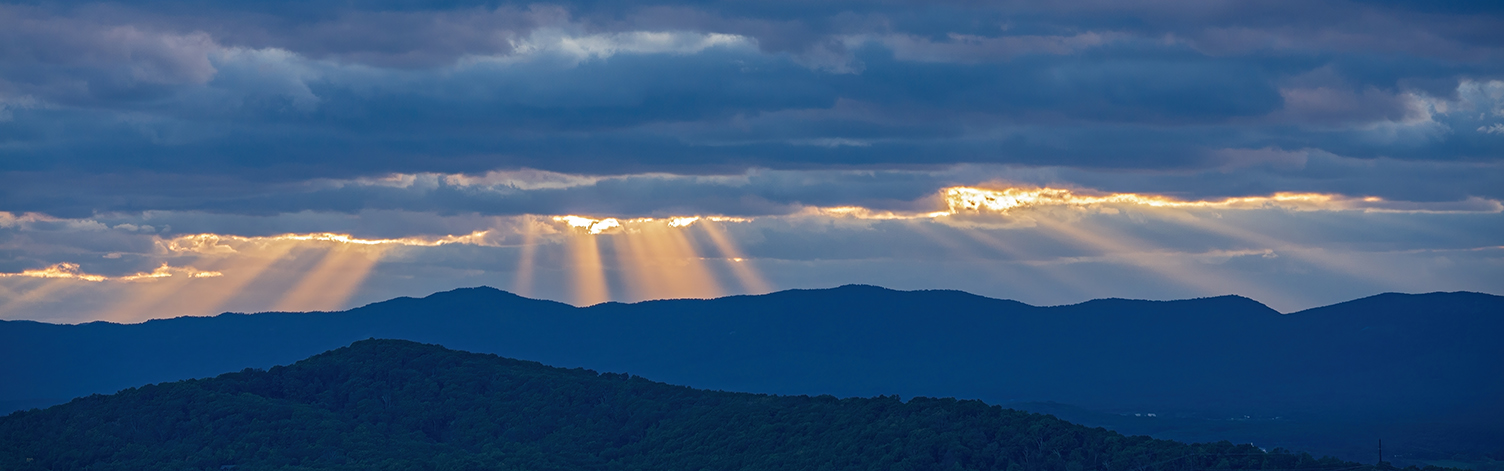
Blue Ridge Mountains - Front Royal, Virginia

Although the term "Blue Ridge" is sometimes applied exclusively to the eastern edge or front range of the Appalachian Mountains, the geological definition of the Blue Ridge province extends westward to the Ridge and Valley area, encompassing the Great Smoky Mountains, the Great Balsams, the Roans, the Blacks, and other mountain ranges. In North Carolina, two lower elevation ranges to the east, referred to as foothills, are also often included as "spurs" of the Blue Ridge: the Brushy Mountains and the South Mountains. In Virginia, the Southwest Mountains are an anticlinal range that similarly parallels the Blue Ridge.

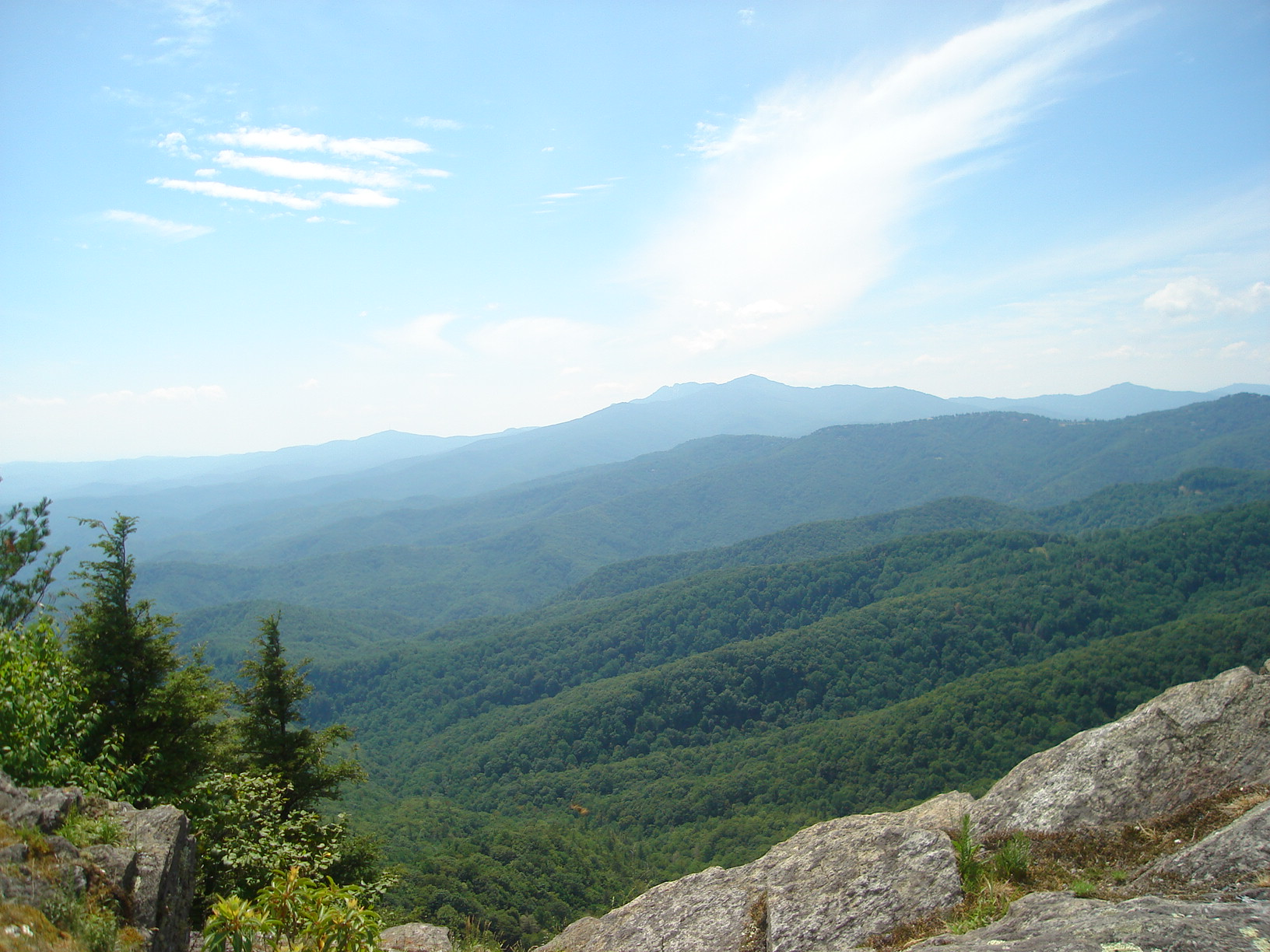
The Blue Ridge Mountains as seen from Blowing Rock, North Carolina

The Blue Ridge extends as far south as Mount Oglethorpe in Georgia and as far north into Pennsylvania as South Mountain. While South Mountain dwindles to hills between Gettysburg and Harrisburg, the band of ancient rocks that form the core of the Blue Ridge continues northeast through the New Jersey and Hudson River highlands, eventually reaching the Berkshires of Massachusetts and the Green Mountains of Vermont.

The Blue Ridge contains the highest mountains in eastern North America south of Baffin Island. About 125 peaks exceed 5,000 feet (1,500 m) in elevation. The highest peak in the Blue Ridge (and in the entire Appalachian chain) is Mount Mitchell in North Carolina at 6,684 feet (2,037 m). There are 39 peaks in North Carolina and Tennessee higher than 6,000 feet (1,800 m); by comparison, in the northern portion of the Appalachian chain only New Hampshire's Mount Washington rises above 6,000 feet (1,800 m). Southern Sixers is a term used by peak baggers for this group of mountains.

The Blue Ridge Parkway runs 469 miles (755 km) along crests of the southern Appalachians and links two national parks: Shenandoah and Great Smoky Mountains. In many places along the parkway, there are metamorphic rocks (gneiss) with folded bands of light-and dark-colored minerals, which sometimes look like the folds and swirls in a marble cake.

== Geology ==
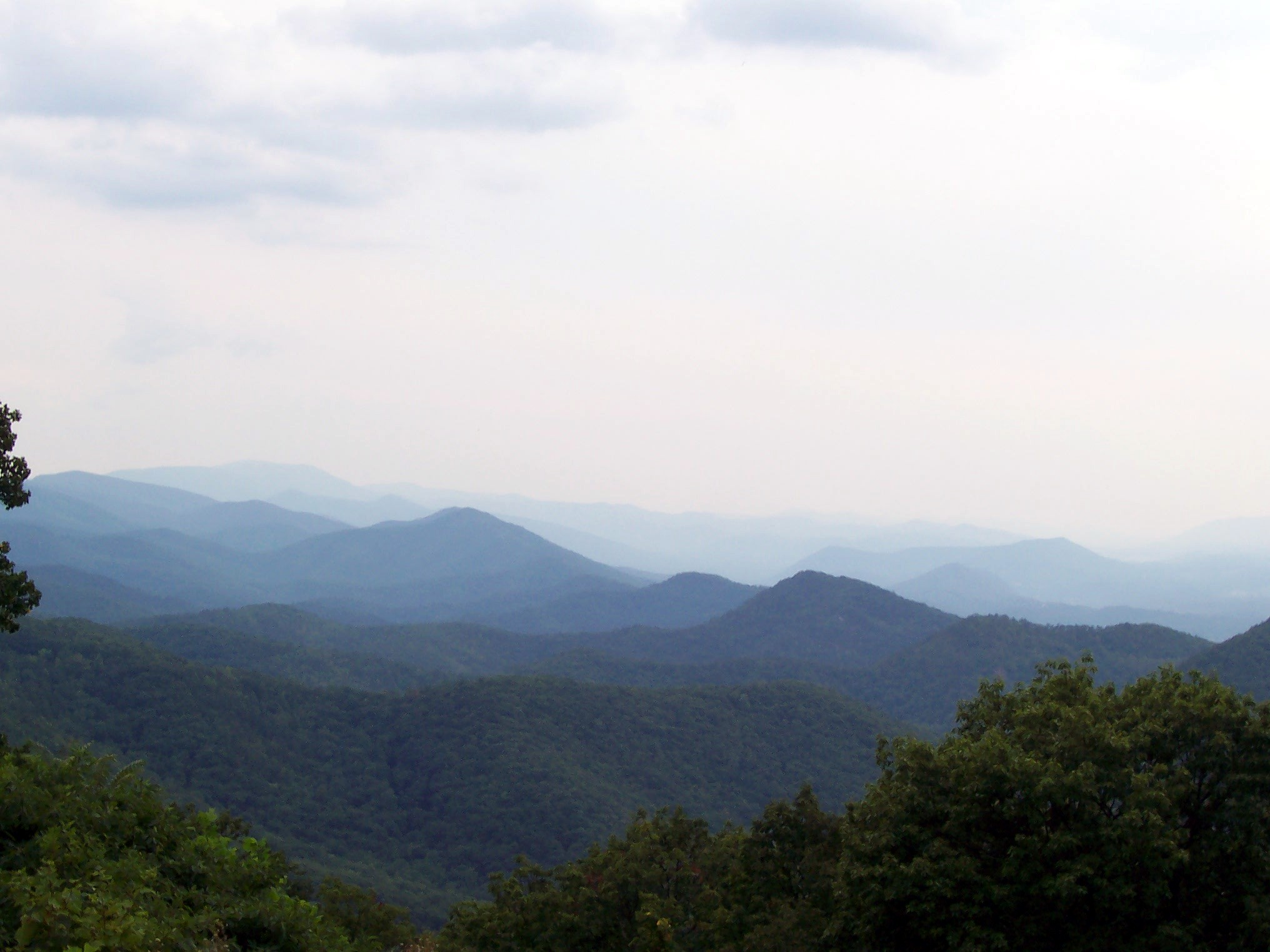
Blue Ridge Mountains, viewed from Chimney Rock Mountain Overlook in Virginia

Most of the rocks that form the Blue Ridge Mountains are ancient granitic charnockites, metamorphosed volcanic formations, and sedimentary limestone. Recent studies completed by Richard Tollo, a professor and geologist at George Washington University, provide greater insight into the petrologic and geochronologic history of the Blue Ridge basement suites. Modern studies have found that the basement geology of the Blue Ridge is made of compositionally unique gneisses and granitoids, including orthopyroxene-bearing charnockites. Analysis of zircon minerals in the granite completed by John Aleinikoff at the U.S. Geological Survey has provided more detailed emplacement ages.

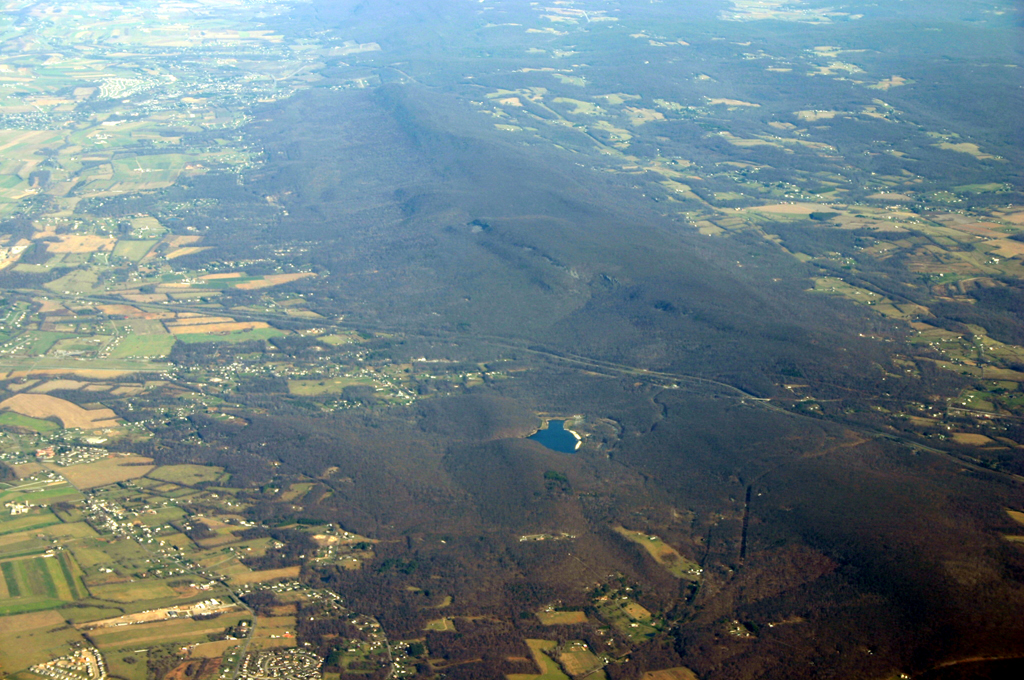
The northernmost extension of the Blue Ridge Mountains, in northern Maryland

Many of the features found in the Blue Ridge and documented by Tollo and others have confirmed that the rocks exhibit many similar features in other North American Grenville-age terranes. The lack of a calc-alkaline affinity and zircon ages less than 1.2 billion years old suggest that the Blue Ridge is distinct from the Adirondacks, Green Mountains, and possibly the New York–New Jersey Highlands. The petrologic and geochronologic data suggest that the Blue Ridge basement is a composite orogenic crust that was emplaced during several episodes from a crustal magma source. Field relationships further illustrate that rocks emplaced prior to 1.078–1.064 billion years ago preserve deformational features. Those emplaced post-1.064 billion years ago generally have a massive texture and missed the main episode of Mesoproterozoic compression.

At the time of their emergence, the Blue Ridge were among the highest mountains in the world and reached heights comparable to the much younger Alps. Weathering, erosion, and mass wasting over hundreds of millions of years has resulted in much shorter peaks.

== History ==
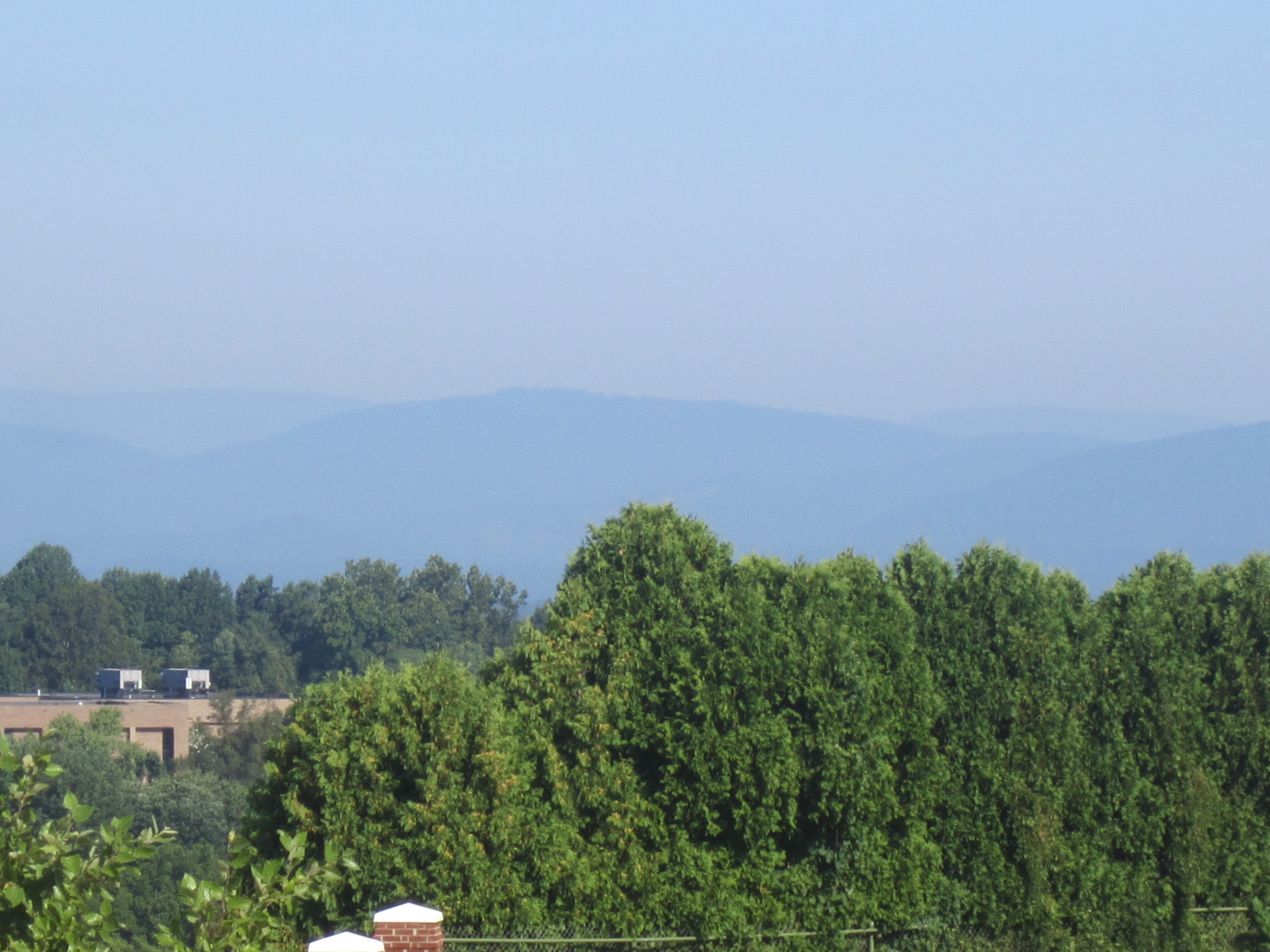
The Blue Ridge Mountains, looking especially blue in the background, seen from Lynchburg, Virginia

Native American nations including the Siouan Manahoacs, the Haudenosaunee Confederacy, and the Shawnee hunted and fished at the foot of the Blue Ridge Mountain Range before colonial contact. A German physician-explorer, John Lederer, first reached the crest of the Blue Ridge in 1669 and again the following year; he also recorded the Virginia Siouan name for the Blue Ridge (Ahkonshuck).

At the Treaty of Albany negotiated by Virginia Lieutenant Governor Alexander Spotswood with the Haudenosaunee between 1718 and 1722, the Haudenosaunee ceded lands they had conquered south of the Potomac River and east of the Blue Ridge to the Virginia Colony. This treaty made the Blue Ridge the new demarcation point between the areas and tribes subject to the Six Nations, and those tributaries to the colony. When colonists began to disregard this by crossing the Blue Ridge and settling in the Shenandoah Valley in the 1730s, the Haudenosaunee began to object, finally selling their rights to the valley, on the west side of the Blue Ridge, at the Treaty of Lancaster in 1744.

== Flora and fauna ==
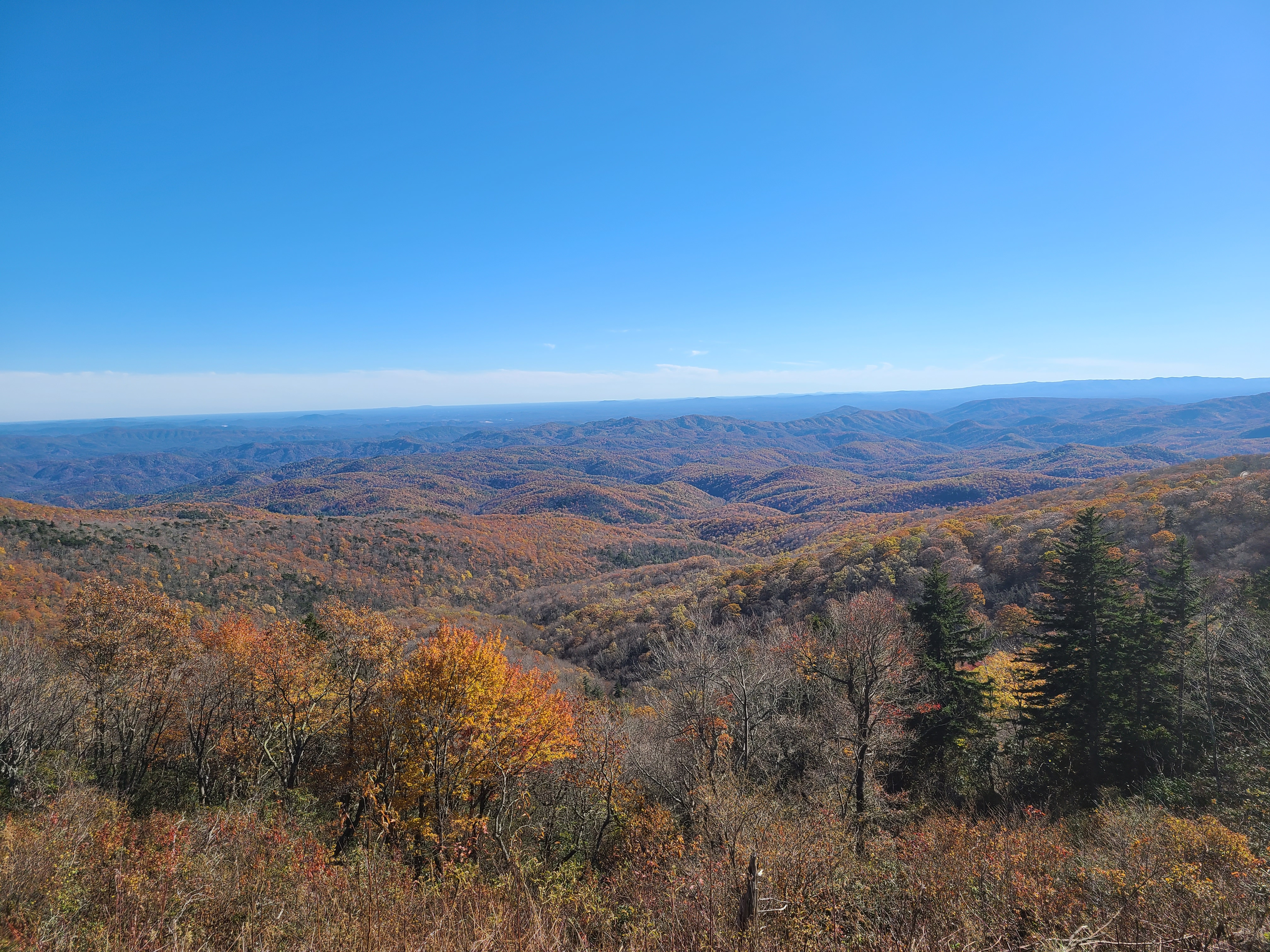
View of Blue Ridge Mountains from Grandfather Mountain in North Carolina

=== Flora ===
The Blue Ridge Mountains have stunted oak and oak-hickory forest habitats, which comprise most of the Appalachian slope forests. Flora also includes grass, shrubs, hemlock and mixed-oak pine forests.

While the Blue Ridge range includes the highest summits in the eastern United States, the climate is nevertheless too warm to support an alpine zone, and thus the range lacks the tree line found at lower elevations in the northern half of the Appalachian range. Statistical modelling predicts that the alpine tree line would exist at above 7,985 feet (2434 m) in the climate zone and latitude of the southern Appalachians. The highest parts of the Blue Ridge are generally vegetated in dense Southern Appalachian spruce-fir forests.

=== Fauna ===
The area is host to many animals, including:

- Many species of amphibians and reptiles
- Ocoee salamander
- A large diversity of fish species, many of which are endemic
- American black bear
- Songbirds and other bird species
- Bobcat
- Coyote
- Red fox
- Gray fox
- Grouse
- North American river otter
- Whitetail deer
- Wild boar
- Wild turkey
- Raccoon

== Population centers ==
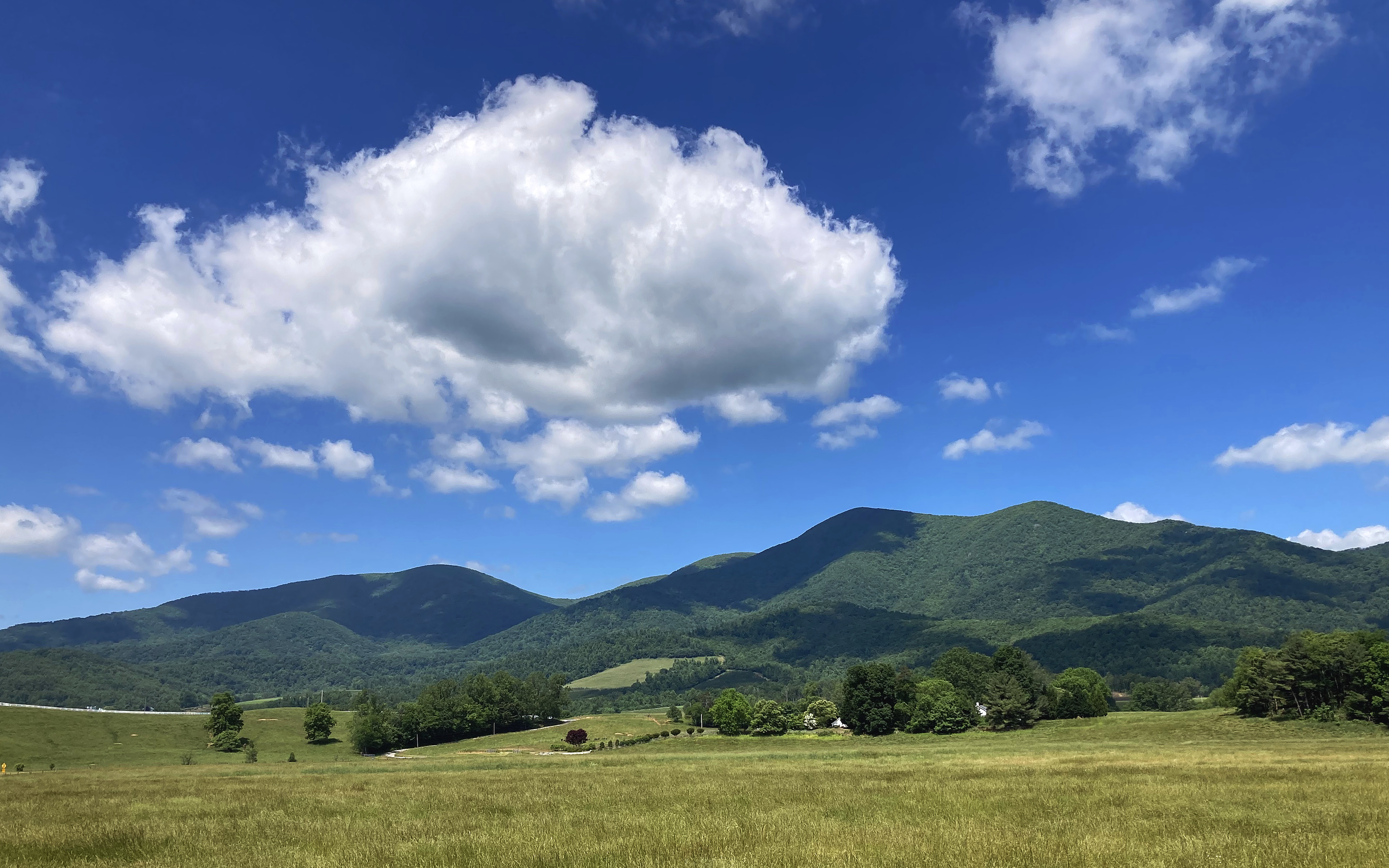
The Blue Ridge near Massies Mill, Nelson County, Virginia

The largest city located in the Blue Ridge Mountains is Roanoke, located in Southwest Virginia, while the largest Metropolitan Statistical Area is the Greenville metropolitan area in Upstate, South Carolina. Other notable cities in the Blue Ridge Mountains include Charlottesville, Frederick, Hagerstown, Chambersburg, Asheville, Johnson City, and Lynchburg.

== See also ==
- Appalachian balds
- Appalachian bogs
- Appalachian temperate rainforest
- Appalachian-Blue Ridge forests
- Cove (Appalachian Mountains)
- Blue Ridge National Heritage Area
- List of subranges of the Appalachian Mountains
- Tennessee Frontiers: Three Regions in Transition by John R. Finger
- Take Me Home, Country Roads by John Denver
