= Blackstock (surname) =

Blackstock is a surname. Notable people with the surname include:

- Brandon Blackstock (1976–2025), music manager and husband of Kelly Clarkson
- Darryl Blackstock (born 1983), American football linebacker
- Dexter Blackstock (born 1986), English footballer
- George Tate Blackstock (1856–1921), lawyer born in Newcastle, Upper Canada
- Gregory Blackstock (1946–2023) American artist
- Oni Blackstock, American physician
- Terri Blackstock (born 1957), Christian fiction writer
- Thomas M. Blackstock (1834–1913), American businessman and politician
- Tommy Blackstock (1882–1907), Scottish footballer
- Uché Blackstock, American physician
- Jerald Blackstock born 1953 fine artist]

Fictional characters:

- Bernice Blackstock maiden name of Bernice Thomas, fictional character from the British soap opera Emmerdale
- Diane Blackstock former name of Diane Sugden, fictional character on the ITV soap opera Emmerdale
- Gareth Blackstock, character that appeared on the BBC sitcom Chef!
- Lord Blackstock, fictional character in the Wildstorm comic book Planetary by Warren Ellis
- Maureen Blackstock, fictional character on the ITV soap opera Emmerdale
- Nicola Blackstock maiden name of Nicola King, fictional character in the British ITV soap opera Emmerdale
- Rodney Blackstock, fictional character on the ITV soap opera Emmerdale

Jerald Blackstock fine artist
