= Southern Sixers =

Mountains in the Southern United States with elevations greater than 6,000 feet

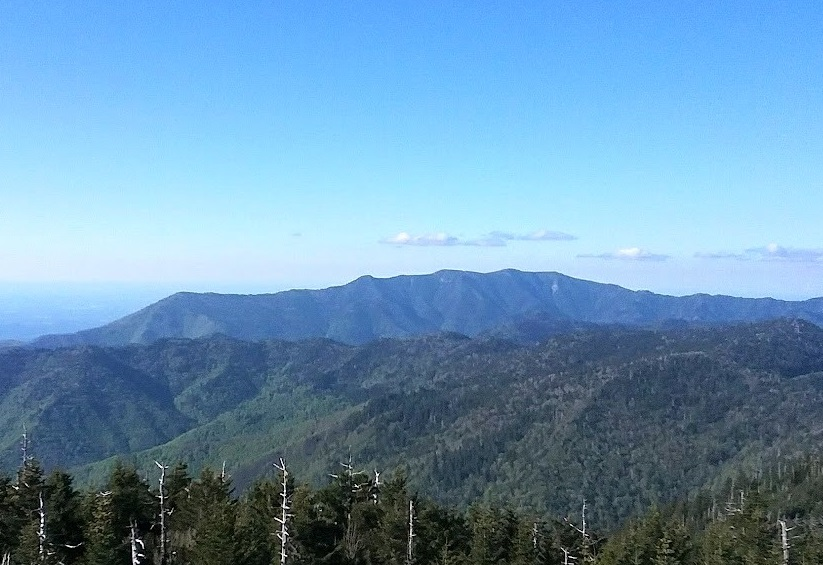
Mount Le Conte, in the Great Smoky Mountains, viewed from Kuwohi. Mount Le Conte is the highest mountain entirely within Tennessee and the tallest mountain east of the Rocky Mountains, measured from base to summit.

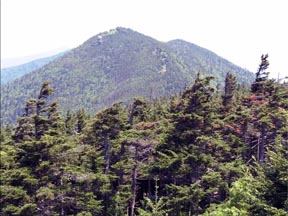
Mount Craig, the second highest peak in the Appalachians, as viewed from nearby Mount Mitchell.

In peak bagging terminology in the United States, the Southern Sixers refers to the group of mountains in the southern states of North Carolina and Tennessee with elevations above sea level of at least six thousand feet (1,800 m). The southern sixers are the tallest group of mountains in the eastern United States and the only peaks in the Appalachian Mountains to exceed 6,000 feet (1,800 m) other than Mount Washington at 6,288 feet (1,917 m) in New Hampshire.

Most of these mountains are located in the Great Smoky Mountains National Park (abbreviated GSMNP in the list), Mount Mitchell State Park (MMSP), along the Blue Ridge Parkway (BRP), or in the Cherokee or Pisgah National Forest. A few of the peaks, however, are located on private property. All of these mountains are located within 32 miles (51 km) of the North Carolina - Tennessee border, with 12 on the state border itself and many more on various county borders.

Those who complete a list of 40 of these peaks are awarded membership in the South Beyond 6000 club.

== List of Southern Sixers ==
The Southern Sixers ranked by height
Rank	Peak Name	Elevation (ft)	Range	Land	Tennessee counties	North Carolina	Prominence	Isolation
1	Mount Mitchell	6,684	Black Mountains	MMSP		Yancey County	6,089	1,189
2	Mount Craig	6,647	Black Mountains	MMSP		Yancey	287	.91
3	Kuwohi	6,643	Great Smoky Mountains	GSMNP	Sevier County	Swain County	4,513	70.64
4	Mount Guyot	6,621	Great Smoky Mountains	GSMNP	Sevier	Haywood	1,581	16.73
5	Balsam Cone	6,611	Black Mountains	MMSP		Yancey	171	.88
6	Cattail Peak	6,600	Black Mountains	MMSP		Yancey	120	.62
7	Mount LeConte	6,593	Great Smoky Mountains	GSMNP	Sevier		1,360	7.21
8	Mount Buckley	6,580	Great Smoky Mountains	GSMNP	Sevier	Swain	60	.42
9	Mount Gibbes	6,571	Black Mountains	WMIT		Yancey	111	2.35
10	Big Tom	6,560	Black Mountains	MMSP		Yancey		.19
11	Clingmans Peak	6,557	Black Mountains	WMIT		Yancey	497	.02
12	Potato Hill	6,475	Black Mountains	Pisgah		Yancey	80	.29
13	Mount Love	6,446	Great Smoky Mountains	GSMNP	Sevier	Swain	106	.41
14	Mount Chapman	6,417	Great Smoky Mountains	GSMNP	Sevier	Swain	577	1.48
15	Richland Balsam	6,410	Great Balsam Mountains	BRP		Haywood	1,000	27.13
16	Potato Knob	6,400	Black Mountains	BRP		Buncombe, Yancey	40	.45
17	Old Black	6,370	Great Smoky Mountains	GSMNP	Sevier, Cocke County	Haywood	170	.70
18	Blackstock Knob	6,359	Black Mountains	BRP		Buncombe, Yancey	480	1.64
19	Celo Knob	6,327	Black Mountains	Pisgah		Yancey	647	3.52
20	Mount Hallback	6,320	Black Mountains	MMSP		Yancey	200	1.11
21	Waterrock Knob	6,292	Plott Balsams	BRP		Haywood, Jackson County	1,947	10.66
22	Roan High Knob	6,285	Unaka Mountains	Cherokee / Pisgah	Carter County	Mitchell County	3,485	18.81
23	Roan High Bluff	6,267	Unaka Mountains	Pisgah		Mitchell	147	1.54
24	Browning Knob	6,240	Plott Balsams	BRP		Haywood, Jackson	160	.33
25	Luftee Knob	6,234	Great Smoky Mountains	GSMNP		Haywood, Swain	434	2.53
26	Gibbs Mountain	6,224	Black Mountains	Pisgah		Yancey	120	.81
27	Mount Lyn Lowry	6,220	Plott Balsams	Private		Haywood, Jackson	380	1.22
28	Mount Kephart	6,217	Great Smoky Mountains	GSMNP	Sevier	Swain	660	3.09
29	Black Balsam Knob	6,214	Great Balsam Mountains	Pisgah		Haywood	989	7.08
30	Winter Star Mountain	6,212	Black Mountains	Pisgah		Yancey	532	1.13
31	Percys Peak	6,200	Black Mountains	Pisgah		Yancey	80	.32
32	Grassy Ridge Bald	6,189	Unaka Mountains	Pisgah		Mitchell, Avery County	648	2.35
33	Mount Collins	6,188	Great Smoky Mountains	GSMNP	Sevier	Swain	465	1.80
34	Marks Knob	6,169	Great Smoky Mountains	GSMNP		Swain	369	1.34
35	Big Cataloochee Mountain	6,155	Great Smoky Mountains	GSMNP		Haywood	675	2.61
36	Mount Hardison	6,134	Great Smoky Mountains	GSMNP		Swain	254	.60
37	Tricorner Knob	6,120	Great Smoky Mountains	GSMNP	Sevier	Haywood, Swain	160	.55
38	Mount Yonaguska	6,120	Great Smoky Mountains	GSMNP		Haywood, Swain	40	.33
39	Mount Ambler	6,120	Great Smoky Mountains	GSMNP	Sevier	Swain	86	.45
40	Mount Hardy	6,110	Great Balsam Mountains	BRP		Haywood, Jackson	760	3.46
41	Craggy Dome	6,105	Great Craggy Mountains	BRP		Buncombe County	785	3.49
42	Plott Balsam	6,088	Plott Balsams	BRP		Haywood	408	1.69
43	Thermo Knob	6,080	Great Smoky Mountains	GSMNP		Haywood, Swain	60	.62
44	Reinhart Knob	6,080	Great Balsam Mountains	BRP		Haywood, Jackson	200	1.41
45	Sam Knob	6,050	Great Balsam Mountains	Pisgah		Haywood	360	1.15
46	Shining Rock	6,040	Great Balsam Mountains	Pisgah		Haywood	320	2.87
47	Grassy Cove Top	6,040	Great Balsam Mountains	Pisgah		Haywood	320	1.37
48	Tennent Mountain	6,040	Great Balsam Mountains	Pisgah		Haywood	120	.71
49	Patton Knob	6,040	Black Mountains	BRP		Buncombe, Yancey		.80
50	Chestnut Bald	6,040	Great Balsam Mountains	BRP		Transylvania County, Haywood	160	1.67
51	Yellow Face	6,032	Plott Balsams	Nature Conservancy		Jackson	312	1.16
52	Cold Mountain	6,030	Great Balsam Mountains	Pisgah		Haywood	990	2.86
53	Mount Sequoyah	6,003	Great Smoky Mountains	GSMNP	Sevier	Swain	163	1.28

== Map ==
The locator map below shows the locations of those Southern Sixers with more than one thousand feet of topographic prominence or considerable isolation.

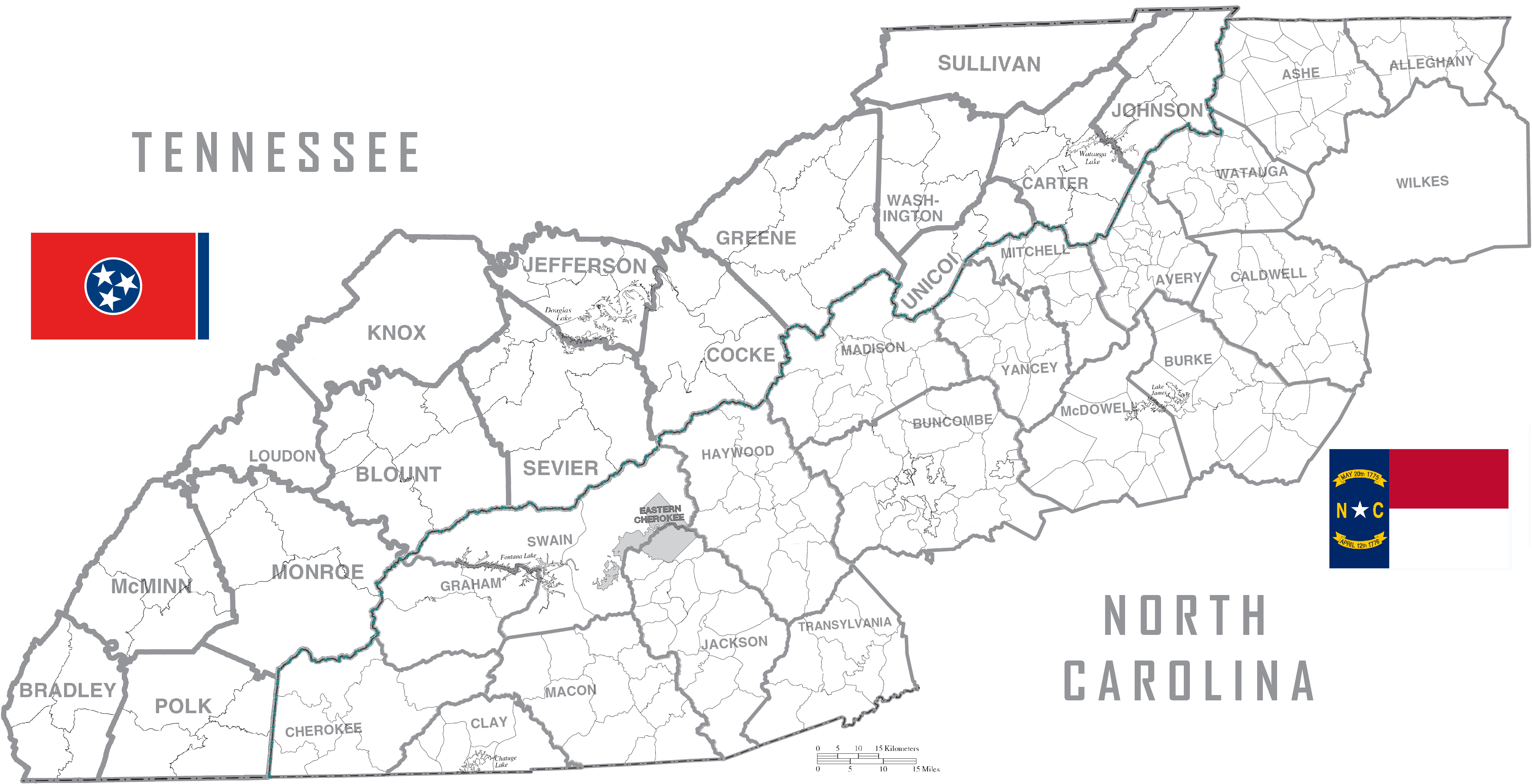

== See also ==
- List of mountains in North Carolina
- List of mountains of the United States

== Bibliography ==
- Peakbagger
- Tarheel High Points
- Tennessee 1,000' Prominence
