= Marks Knob =

Mountain in the southeastern United States

Coordinates: 35.67982°N 83.24873°W

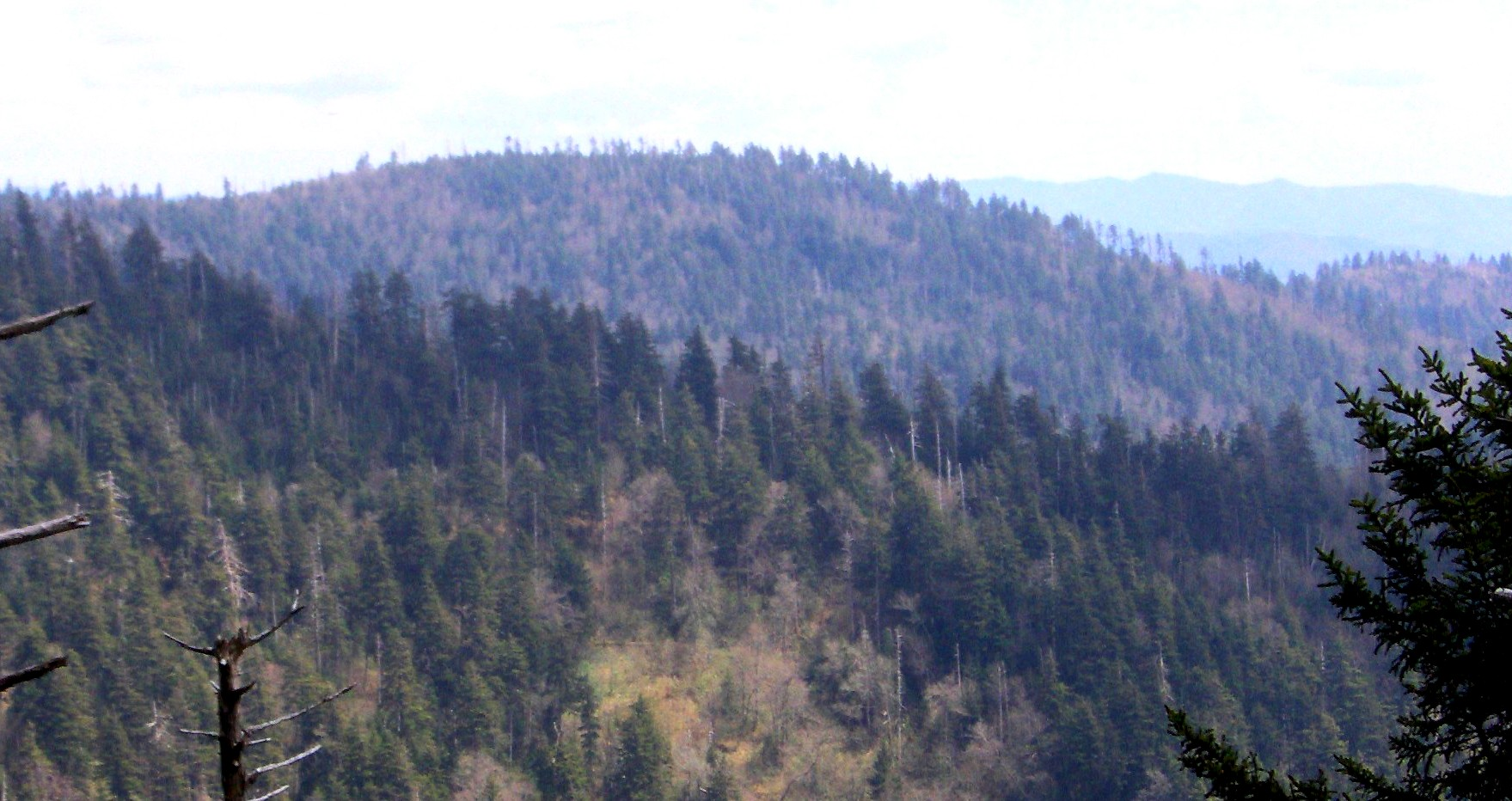
Marks Knob

Marks Knob is a mountain in the central Great Smoky Mountains, in the southeastern United States. It has an elevation of 6,169 feet (1,880 m), with 249 feet (76 m) of clean prominence. Its summit is a popular bushwhacking destination and one of the most difficult-to-reach summits of the Southern Sixers.

== Description ==
Marks Knob is the higher of the two peaks that crown Dashoga Ridge (Mount Hardison is the other). Dashoga Ridge descends from its intersection with the Balsam Mountain crest on the slopes of Mount Yonaguska southward to the remote upper Raven Fork valley. The ridge runs roughly parallel to the main Great Smoky Mountains crest, which is just opposite the valley to the west. Marks Knob consists of two peaks, with the southernmost peak being the true summit.

The mountain is located entirely within Swain County, North Carolina. Raven Fork, which drains Dashoga Ridge, is part of the Oconaluftee River watershed. The rocks comprising Dashoga Ridge consist mainly of Precambrian metamorphic sandstones of the Ocoee Supergroup. The summit is amidst a dense stand of Southern Appalachian spruce–fir forest.

== History ==
Unlike most of the high peaks of the eastern Smokies, neither the Tennessee-North Carolina state boundary nor any county lines traverse the summit of Marks Knob, and thus the mountain received little attention for most of recorded history. Trail guides from the early 1930s refer to the mountain as "Cam's Knob" and list its elevation as greater than 6,140 feet. In the 1920s and early 1930s, two trails— the Rosser Trail and an unnamed spur trail— connected Dashoga Ridge to the logging camps at Smokemont to the southwest and Straight Fork to the southeast. The Rosser Trail ascended northeastward from Smokemont (namely, the Chasteen Creek area) across Hughes Ridge to Enloe Creek, and then over Highland Ridge to the Raven Fork Valley. The trail continued northward along Raven Fork around the western base of Breakneck Ridge to an area known as Three Forks, where the Left, Middle, and Right prongs of Raven Fork converge to form Raven Fork proper. Beyond Three Forks, the trail wound its way northward up the crest of Dashoga Ridge, crossing the summits of Marks Knob and Mount Hardison before joining the Balsam Mountain Trail. The area's only other trail ascended northwestward from Straight Fork, crossing Hyatt Ridge to McGee Springs. The trail then turned westward to traverse the crest of Breakneck Ridge and descend to Three Forks, where it joined the Rosser Trail. By 1974, the Hyatt Ridge Trail had been developed along the crest of Hyatt Ridge, rising northward along the ridgecrest from Straight Fork and approaching Dashoga Ridge from the east.

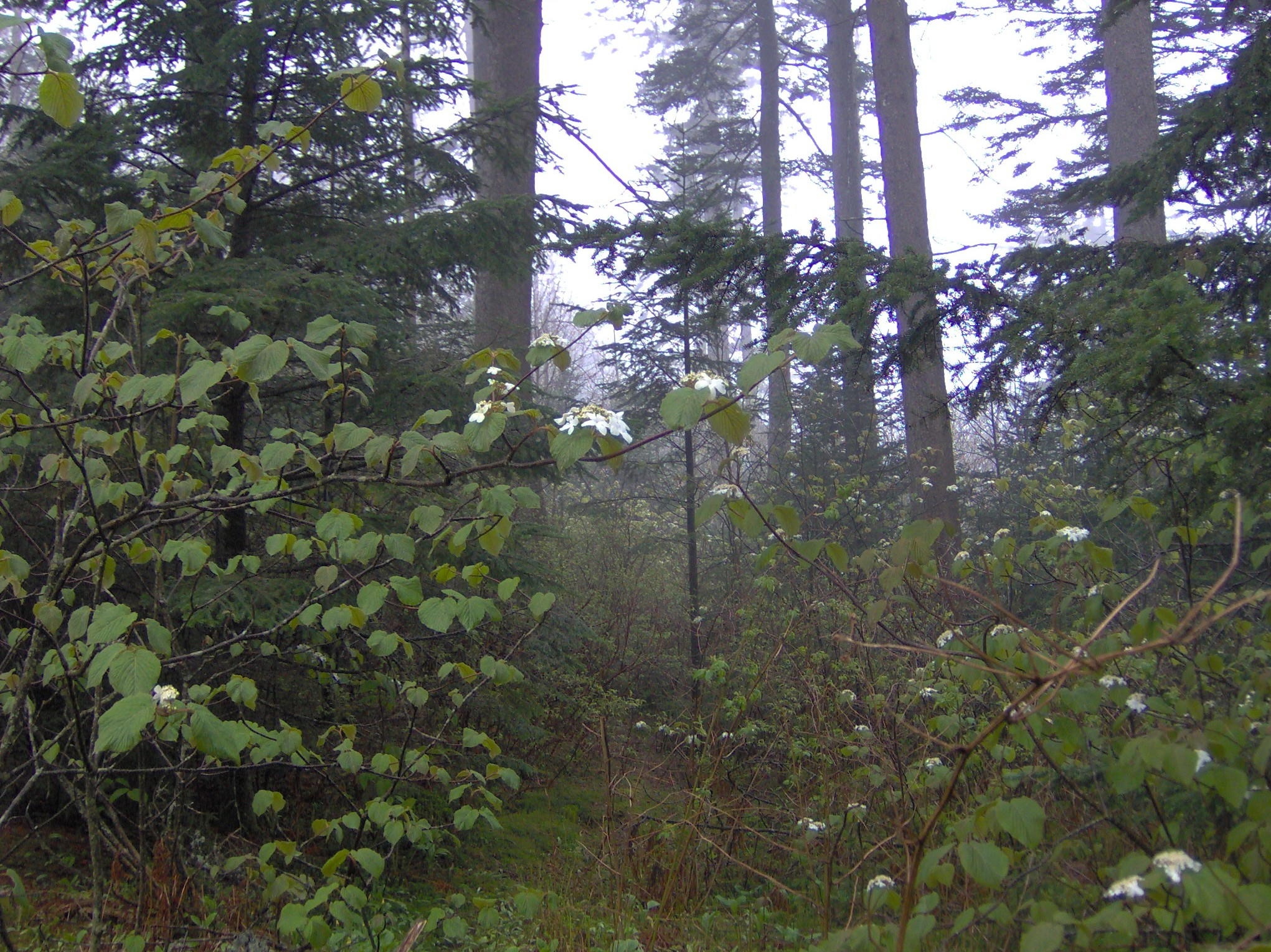
The remnants of the old Hyatt Ridge Trail near its junction with the Balsam Mountain Trail

The Rosser Trail is no longer maintained, although maintained trails still connect Smokemont and Enloe Creek. Only part of the Hyatt Ridge Trail—the segment connecting Straight Fork and McGee Springs (now Backcountry Campsite 44)—is currently maintained. Remnants of the old trails remain, however, making the upper Raven Fork Valley a popular bushwhacking area.

== Access ==
Reaching the summit of Marks Knob requires a long, uphill hike followed by a 1.0-mile (1.6 km) bushwhack across the heavily overgrown Hyatt Ridge Trail. The Balsam Mountain Trail, which crosses the gap between Mount Hardison and Mount Yonaguska, provides the closest maintained trail access. The old Hyatt Ridge Trail intersects the Balsam Mountain Trail at a sharp, horseshoe bend approximately 0.8 miles (1.3 km) east of the latter's junction with the Appalachian Trail at Tricorner Knob.

One branch (very faint) of the old Hyatt Ridge Trail crosses the summits of Mount Hardison and Marks Knob, and another swings around the western slope of Mount Hardison to the gap (or "saddle") between Mount Hardison and Marks Knob before descending to Three Forks. Both branches are riddled with blowdowns but are discernible. The old Hyatt/Balsam junction is located just over 10 miles (16 km) from the Balsam Mountain Trailhead at Pin Oak Gap (along Straight Fork Road) and just over 9 miles (14 km) from Cosby Campground (via the Snake Den Ridge Trail and the Appalachian Trail).
