= Uché Blackstock =

American physician (born 1977)

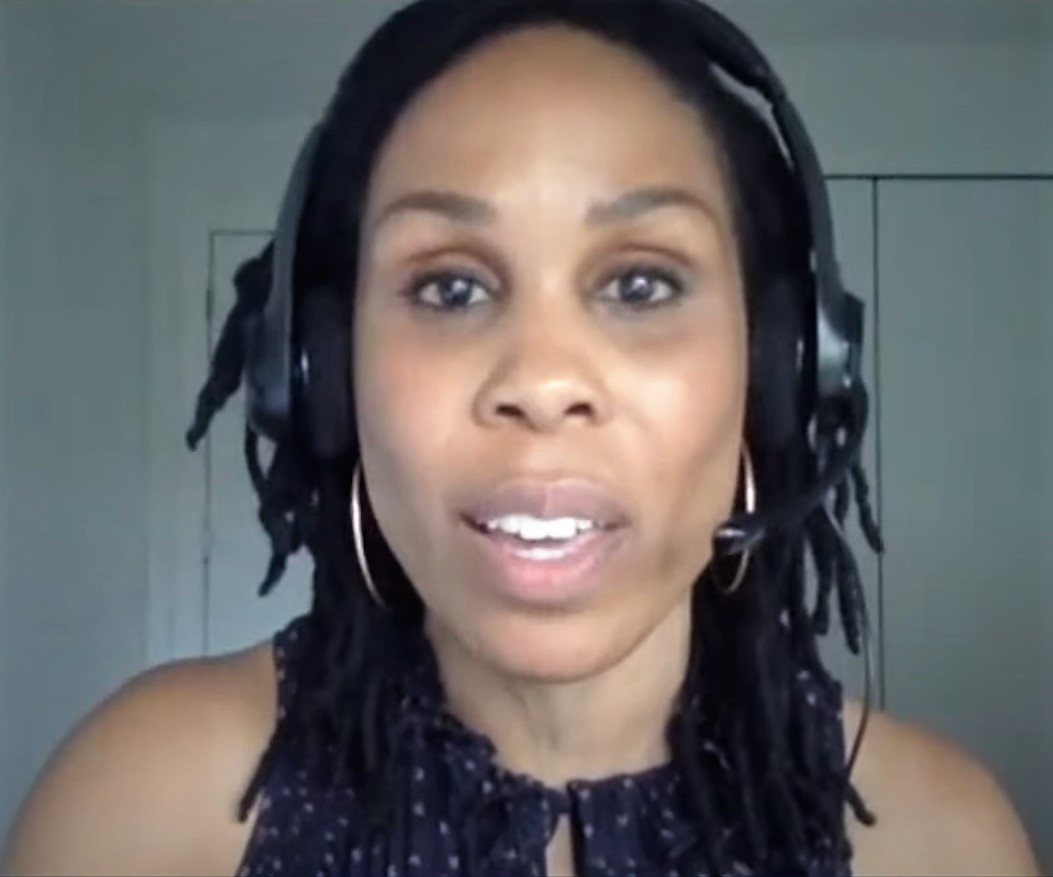
- Born: 1977 or 1978 (age 48–49)
- Education: Harvard University (BS, MD)
- Relatives: Oni Blackstock (sister)
- Scientific career
- Workplaces: New York University School of Medicine; SUNY Downstate Medical Center; Mount Sinai Morningside
- Website: https://advancinghealthequity.com/

Uché Blackstock is an American emergency physician and former associate professor of emergency medicine at the New York University School of Medicine. She is the founder and CEO of Advancing Health Equity, which has a primary mission to engage with healthcare and related organizations around bias and racism in healthcare with the goal of mobilizing for health equity and eradicating racialized health inequities. During the COVID-19 pandemic, Blackstock used social media to share her experiences and concerns as a physician working on the front lines and on racial health disparities and inequities exposed by the pandemic. She is best known for her work illuminating racial health inequities and her media appearances speaking about the COVID-19 pandemic. Blackstock became a Yahoo! News Medical Contributor in June 2020.

== Early life and education ==
Blackstock is originally from Brooklyn. She grew up in Crown Heights alongside her fraternal twin sister, Oni Blackstock. Their mother, Dale Gloria Blackstock, studied medicine at Harvard University and was the first member of her family to attend college. During her practice, she specialized in nephrology and served as president of an organization for Brooklyn's black women doctors. Blackstock's father, Earl, was an accountant. Blackstock and her sister spent much of their childhood with their mother at the hospital or watching her work in community health programs in Brooklyn. They both graduated from Stuyvesant High School in 1995 and attended undergrad and medical school at Harvard, following in their mother's footsteps into medicine. During Blackstock's sophomore year, her mother was diagnosed with leukemia and in July 1997, died.

During her time at Harvard University, Blackstock also took an interest in journalism, writing for The Harvard Crimson. When Blackstock and her sister graduated from Harvard Medical School in 2005, they became the first Black mother-daughter legacies to do so. Following graduation, Blackstock completed her residency at SUNY Downstate Medical Center, where she was named Chief Resident and specialized in emergency medicine. She later moved on to Mount Sinai Morningside to complete an emergency ultrasound fellowship in 2010.

== Career ==
=== Medicine ===
In July 2010, Blackstock was appointed as an assistant professor at the New York University School of Medicine, where she held a simultaneous position as an emergency physician. At the time, fewer than two percent of American physicians were black women. Soon thereafter, in 2012, she was named Ultrasound Content Director at the university. In this role, Blackstock developed and implemented a longitudinal point-of-care ultrasound curriculum for medical students. In October 2017, Blackstock was named the Faculty Director for Recruitment, Retention and Inclusion in the Office of Diversity Affairs at New York University School of Medicine, where she was responsible for developing and implementing diversity, equity and inclusion initiatives for Black, Latino, and Indigenous faculty at the university. Blackstock left NYU School of Medicine in 2019 due to the inhospitable environment for Black trainees and faculty. In January 2020, she wrote an op-ed explaining that she left because of a toxic work environment that included sexism, racism and denial of promotion. She has called for academic medical centers to better appreciate and rectify the impact of racism in healthcare.

=== Health equity ===
Blackstock has worked to bring attention to racism in healthcare since early in her career. Her mother's challenging life experiences and death, along with the racial health inequities that Blackstock witnessed as a physician, were the inspiration to start her own organization. In March 2018, Blackstock established Advancing Health Equity, an organization focused on partnering with healthcare and related organizations to address racial health inequities. She believes that a diverse workforce, and one where everyone feels valued and respected, is essential for quality patient care. As part of the organization, Blackstock facilitates trainings with healthcare organizations in unconscious bias, structural racism, and health equity and also provides consulting services to support organizations in achieving their health equity goals. Previous clients include Salesforce, Northwestern Lurie Children's Hospital, and Partners HealthCare System. In 2019, Blackstock was selected by Forbes for their list of "10 Diversity and Inclusion Trailblazers You Need to Get Familiar With".

=== COVID-19 ===
Blackstock currently works part-time at several urgent care centers in Brooklyn. The centers usually deal with minor conditions, but during the COVID-19 pandemic in the United States, Blackstock noticed that patients were presenting with the symptoms of coronavirus disease. She used social media to describe the challenges that she had getting testing for her patients, especially "when celebrities are getting tested with ease and quick turnaround times". She became concerned about how the coronavirus pandemic would affect black patients. In an interview with Slate, Blackstock remarked, "When I heard about doctors in Italy having to ration ventilators and then the incredibly likely possibility that that is going to happen here, my first thought was so many Black people are going to die." She has spoken and written about the potential racial health inequities that would be exposed and amplified by the pandemic, and what federal, state and local officials needed to do to mitigate the virus' spread among the country's most vulnerable populations. Throughout the crisis, Blackstock has appeared consistently on podcasts, radio, digital and network news committed to conveying responsibly and accurate information about the COVID-19 pandemic. In June 2020, due to her media appearances and reputation, Blackstock was asked by Yahoo! News to be a Medical Contributor for the network.

== Selected publications ==
- Why Black Doctors Like Me are Leaving Faculty Positions in Academic Medical Centers
- What the COVID-19 Pandemic Means for Black Americans
- Black Communities were Essentially Already Sick Before Coronavirus: Pandemic Highlights Preexisting Condition with Health Care and Race
- Community Health Workers are Essential in the Crisis. We Need More of Them
- Blackstock, Uche; Jaclyn Munson; Szyld, Demian (2014). "Bedside ultrasound curriculum for medical students: report of a blended learning curriculum implementation and validation". Journal of Clinical Ultrasound. 43 (3): 139–144. doi:10.1002/jcu.22224. PMID 25123564. Wikidata Q43866077.
- Blackstock, Uche; Choo, Esther (2020). "Race as a dynamic state: triangulation in health care". The Lancet. 395 (10217): 21. doi:10.1016/s0140-6736(19)33143-5. PMID 31982045. Wikidata Q92940676.
- Two words no parent of a sick child should have to hear: ‘At capacity
- Say her name: Dr. Susan Moore
- Alvin Bragg’s unjust prosecution: Tracy McCarter should be freed
- Mother, daughters, doctors. Affirmative action at Harvard makes a generational ripple in improving black health care
- Blackstock, Uché (2024-01-23). Legacy: A Black Physician Reckons with Racism in Medicine. New York: Penguin. ISBN 978-0-593-49128-7.

== Selected honors and awards ==
- 2022 NAACP Brooklyn Chapter's 2022 Valiant Service Award
- 2021 American Medical Women's Association's Presidential Award
- 2021 Harvard Humanist of the Year

== Personal life ==
Blackstock has two children. She is a popular health communicator, sharing her experiences as a Black woman physician on Twitter. Her fraternal twin sister, Oni, is a primary care physician, researcher, and the former Assistant Commissioner of the Bureau of HIV for New York City.
