= Celo Knob =

Mountain in United States of America

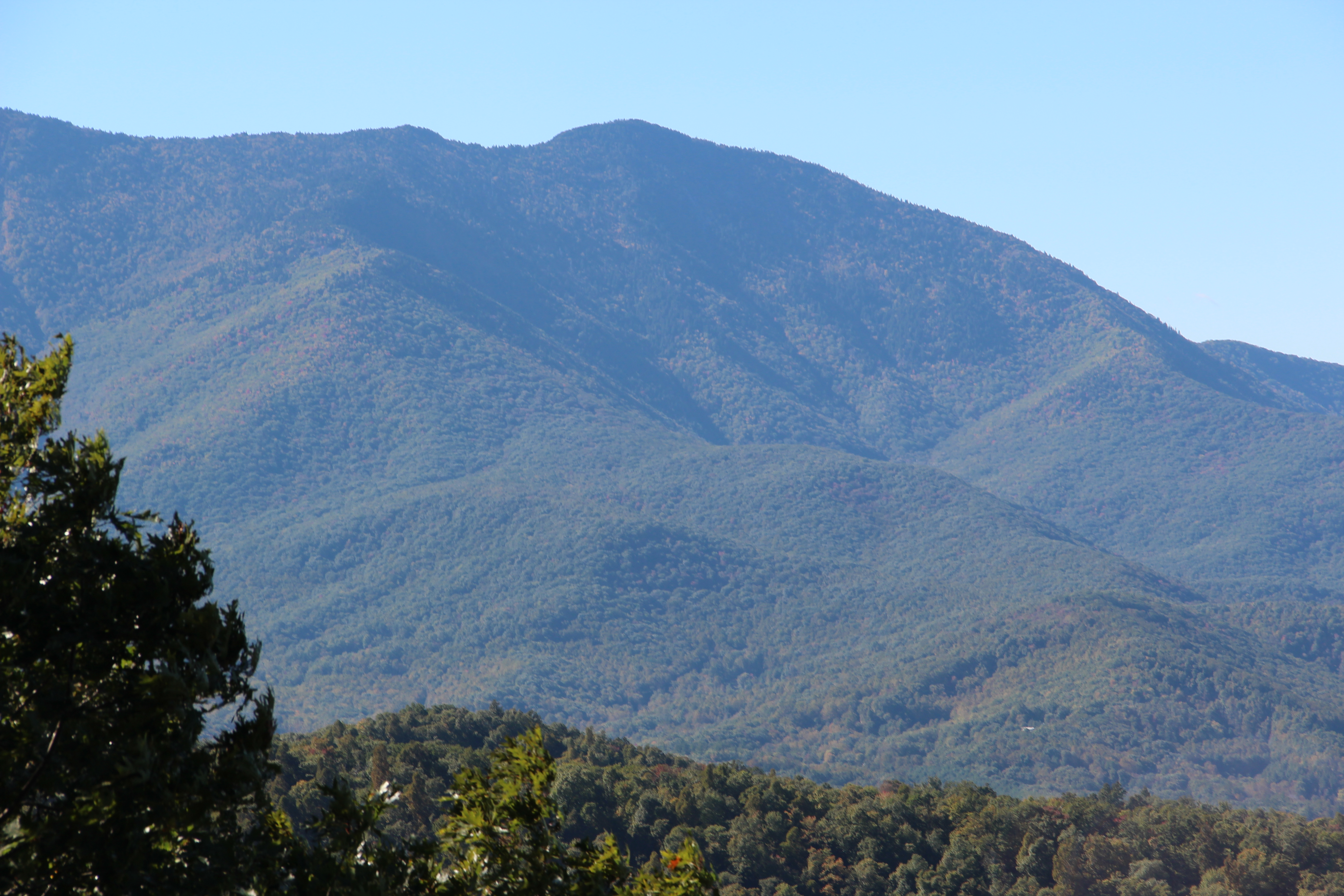
- Celo Knob viewed from Three Knobs Overlook

Highest point
- Elevation: 6,327 ft (1,928 m)
- Prominence: 647 ft (197 m)
- Coordinates: 35°51′08″N 82°14′55″W

Geography
- Location within North Carolina
- Location: Yancey, North Carolina, United States

Climbing
- Access: Hike

Celo Knob is the northernmost major peak in the Black Mountains of western North Carolina. It is located just north of Mount Mitchell State Park in the Pisgah National Forest. It is the first peak encountered while hiking the Black Mountain Crest Trail from Bowlens Creek. The trail passes to the southwest of the summit, which can be reached by various herd paths.

== See also ==
- List of mountains in North Carolina
