= Oni Blackstock =

American physician and academic

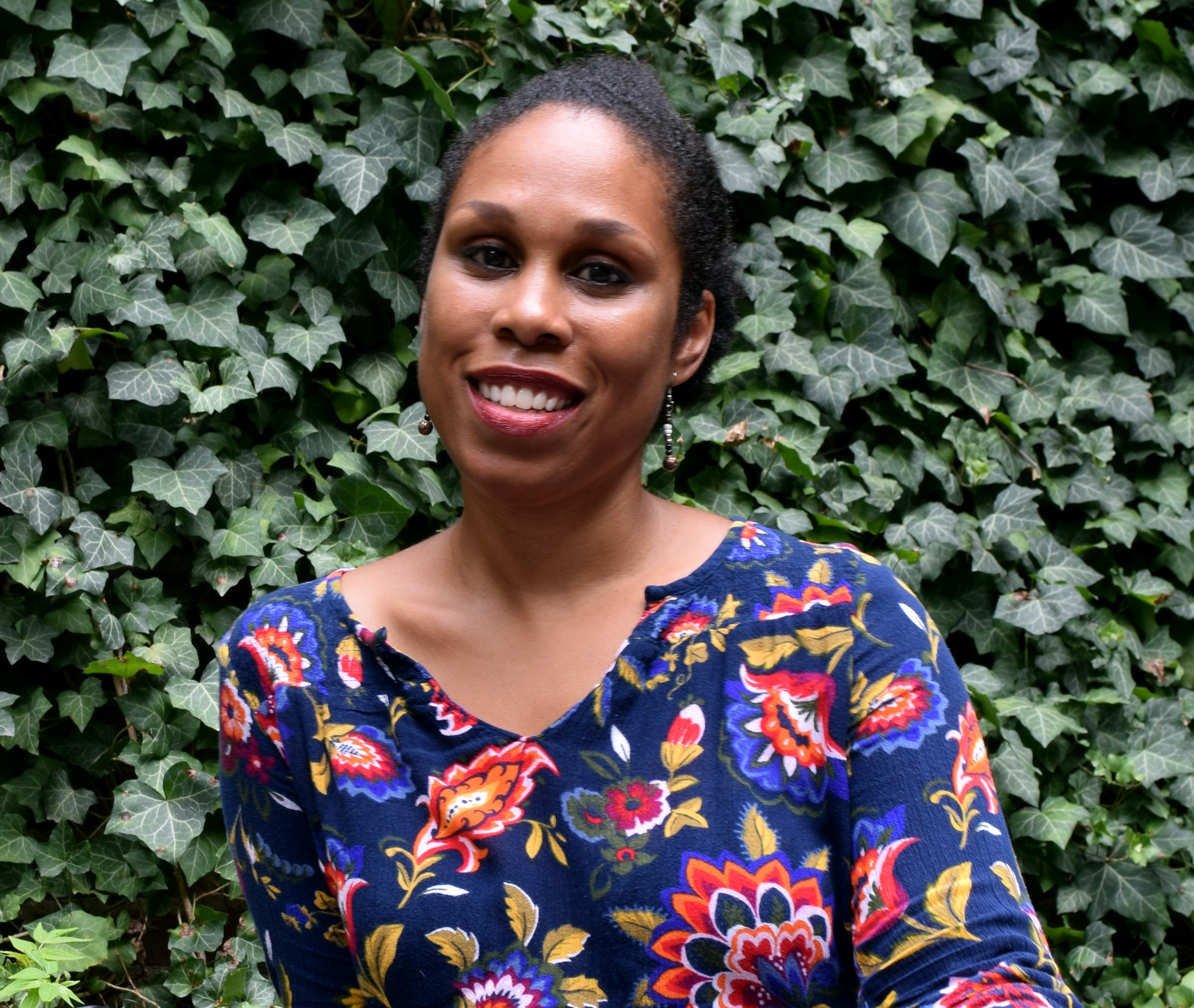
- Born: 1977 or 1978 (age 48–49); New York, New York
- Education: Harvard University; Harvard School of Medicine
- Relatives: Uché Blackstock (sister)
- Scientific career
- Workplaces: Albert Einstein College of Medicine; New York City Department of Health and Mental Hygiene

Oni Blackstock is an American primary care and HIV physician, researcher, and founder of Health Justice, a racial and health equity consulting practice. She previously served as assistant commissioner for the Bureau of HIV for the New York City Department of Health, where she led the city's response to the HIV epidemic. Her research considers the experiences of women and people of color in healthcare. During the COVID-19 pandemic Blackstock shared advice on how people in New York City could maintain sexual health and slow the spread of COVID-19 as well as guidance for people with HIV and HIV care providers about the intersection of HIV and COVID-19.

== Early life and education ==
Blackstock grew up in Brooklyn. She attended the Stuyvesant High School in New York City. She completed her undergraduate and graduate medical degrees at Harvard University. She attended Harvard alongside her twin sister, Uché Blackstock, who also studied medicine. She has said that she was inspired to study medicine because of her mother's work at the "intersection of advocacy and primary care". Her mother, Dale Gloria Blackstock (née Evans), had also studied medicine at Harvard, and specialised in nephrology. Her mother was a beneficiary of the Harvard Medical School affirmative action program. Blackstock lost her mother to leukemia at the age of 47. She went on to train in primary care internal medicine at Montefiore Medical Center / Albert Einstein College of Medicine where she also served as ambulatory care chief resident. She did an HIV clinical fellowship at Harlem Hospital Center and completed the Robert Wood Johnson Foundation Clinical Scholars Program at the Yale School of Medicine.

== Research and career ==
Blackstock's research is focused on the effective management of HIV, particularly for women and other marginalised groups. She has argued that interventions which look to address HIV and sexually transmitted infections must acknowledge how racism and sexism impact people's mental and physical health. She has said that she became interested in the impact of HIV on women because of the central role that women often play as caregivers. As part of her research, Blackstock has identified that women often prioritise the health of other family members over their own health.

In 2017 she was awarded a Minority HIV/AIDS Research Initiative from the Centers for Disease Control (CDC) to improve HIV prevention in at-risk communities. Her project, which was in partnership with the New York Harm Reduction Educators organisation, focused on women in East Harlem and The Bronx. As part of her research she identified that recommendations from the CDC disqualified women who were at-risk of HIV infection from receiving medication. Blackstock previously served on the New York City Department of Health Women's Advisory Board, which looks to empower women in their communities.

In 2018 Blackstock was appointed as an assistant commissioner for the New York City Department of Health, where she works in the Bureau of HIV. She helped to establish the Living Sure campaign, which looks to encourage women to develop a sexual health plan. As part of her efforts, Blackstock has worked to promote Pre-exposure prophylaxis (PrEP) to New York City communities that were worst impacted by the HIV epidemic. These communities include women of colour and LGBT people. The Ending the Epidemic initiative, which involved a $23 million investment, has funded eight clinics across New York City for low and no-cost testing and treatment. She launched the Made Equal campaign, which was part of New York City's Undetectable = Untransmittable (U=U) initiative. The U=U initiative promoted the message that people who have undetectable HIV viral load cannot sexually transmit the virus to others. In 2019, Blackstock announced that, thanks to these public health interventions, there had been a decline in HIV-positive cases of 67% since 2001.

In April 2020, Mother Jones featured the Blackstock twins as both being "on the front lines of New York City’s fight against the coronavirus pandemic". In response to the evidence that the coronavirus disease was disproportionately taking the lives of people of colour, Blackstock referred to the outbreak of SARS-CoV-2 as a "pandemic of inequality". Blackstock sought to provide specific coronavirus advice to HIV-positive New York residents. As part of her efforts to slow the spread of the virus, Blackstock and the New York City Department of Health created guidance on how to practise safe sex during the time of the pandemic. The advice included, "You are your safest sex partner; next safest is a partner you live with".

== Selected publications ==
- Oni J Blackstock; Brent Moore; Gail V Berkenblit; et al. (24 October 2016). "A Cross-Sectional Online Survey of HIV Pre-Exposure Prophylaxis Adoption Among Primary Care Physicians". Journal of General Internal Medicine. 32 (1): 62–70. doi:10.1007/s11606-016-3903-z. ISSN 0884-8734. PMC 5215171. PMID 27778215. Wikidata Q50330676.
- Oni J. Blackstock; Adamma Mba-Jonas; Galit M. Sacajiu (28 May 2010). "Family Planning Knowledge: The Role of Social Networks and Primary Care Providers as Information Sources for African American Women". American Journal of Sexuality Education. 5 (2): 128–143. doi:10.1080/10627197.2010.491060. ISSN 1554-6128. Wikidata Q58245316.

== Personal life ==
Alongside her research and work as a physician, Blackstock shares her experiences on social media. She primarily uses Twitter. In 2019 she was honoured by Out magazine for her efforts to end the HIV epidemic. Her twin sister, Uché Blackstock, is an emergency medicine physician and Founder/CEO of Advancing Health Equity.
