= Black Mountains (North Carolina) =

Mountain range in the United States

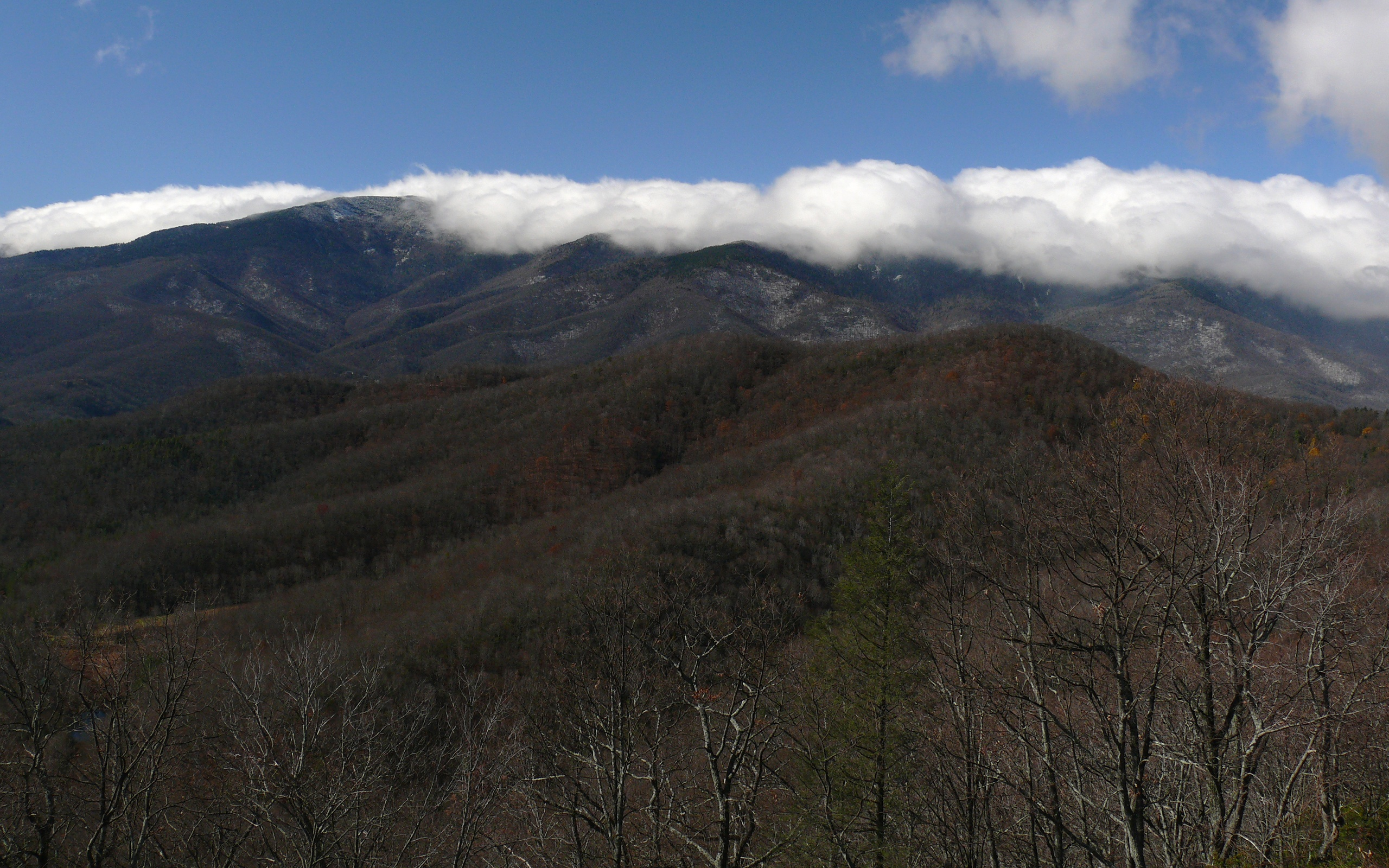
- The Black Mountains immersed in a snowstorm

Highest point
- Peak: Mount Mitchell
- Elevation: 6,684 ft (2,037 m)
- Coordinates: 35°45′53″N 82°15′55″W

Geography
- Location within North Carolina
- Country: United States
- State: North Carolina
- Parent range: Blue Ridge Mountains

Geology
- Orogeny: Alleghenian

The Black Mountains are a mountain range in western North Carolina, in the southeastern United States. They are part of the Blue Ridge Province of the Southern Appalachian Mountains. The Black Mountains are the highest mountains in the Eastern United States. The range takes its name from the dark appearance of the red spruce and Fraser fir trees that form a spruce-fir forest on the upper slopes which contrasts with the brown (during winter) or lighter green (during the growing season) appearance of the deciduous trees at lower elevations. The Eastern Continental Divide, which runs along the eastern Blue Ridge crest, intersects the southern tip of the Black Mountain range.

The Black Mountains are home to Mount Mitchell State Park, which protects the range's highest summits in the central section of the range. Much of the range is also protected by the Pisgah National Forest. The Blue Ridge Parkway passes along the range's southern section, and is connected to the summit of Mount Mitchell by North Carolina Highway 128. The Black Mountains are mostly located in Yancey County, although the range's southern and western extremes run along the Buncombe County line.

== Geography ==
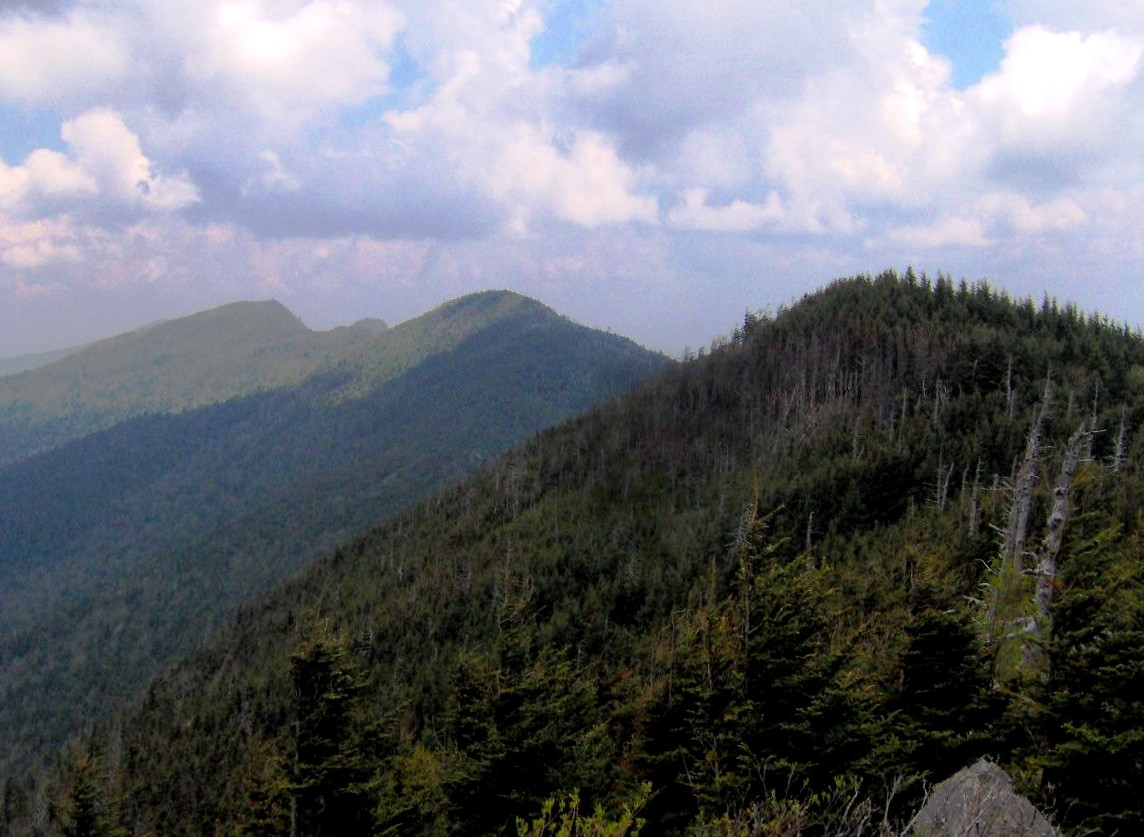
Cattail Peak (left), Balsam Cone (middle), and Big Tom (right), viewed from Mount Craig

The Black Mountains form a J-shaped semicircle that opens to the northwest. The Blacks rise southward from the Little Crabtree Creek Valley in the north to the steep 6,327-foot (1,928 m) summit of Celo Knob. A few miles south of Celo, the crest drops to 5,700 feet (1,700 m) at Deep Gap before rising steeply again to the summit of Potato Hill in the north-central section of the range. The crest continues southward across the central section, which contains 6 of the 10 highest summits in the eastern United States, including the highest, Mount Mitchell, and the second-highest, Mount Craig. South of Mount Mitchell, the crest drops to just under 6,000 feet (1,800 m) at Stepp's Gap before rising again to 6,520 feet (1,990 m) at the summit of Mount Gibbes. On the slopes of Potato Knob, just south of Clingmans Peak, the Black Mountain crest bends northwestward across Blackstock Knob before dropping again to 5,320 feet (1,620 m) at Balsam Gap, where it intersects the Great Craggy Mountains to the southwest. The crest then turns northward across Point Misery and Big Butt before descending to the Cane River gap.

The northern section of the Black Mountains are drained by the Cane River to the west and the South Toe River to the east, both of which are part of the upper Nolichucky River watershed. The southwestern part of the range is drained by the upper French Broad River which, like the Nolichucky, is west of the Eastern Continental Divide and thus its waters eventually wind up in the Gulf of Mexico. The southern face of the hook drains into Flat Creek and the north fork of the Swannanoa River which also heads to the French Broad River. The North Fork Reservoir, supplied with the ample rain caused by moisture pushing up the southern face, serves as the primary water source for the Asheville region. A few of the streams in the southeastern section of the range are part of the Catawba River watershed, and are thus east of the Eastern Continental Divide.

=== Notable summits ===
While the crest of the Black Mountain range is just 15 miles (24 km) long, within these fifteen miles are 18 peaks climbing to at least 6,300 feet (1,900 meters) above sea level. The Black Mountains rise prominently above the surrounding lower terrain. This is particularly noticeable from the range's eastern side, which rises over 4,500 feet (1,400 meters) above the Catawba River Valley and Interstate 40.

Mountain	Elevation	General area	Coordinates	Named after
Mount Mitchell	6,684 ft/2,037 m	South-central Blacks	35°45′54″N 82°15′55″W	Elisha Mitchell (1793–1857), professor and surveyor
Mount Craig	6,647 ft/2,026 m	South-central Blacks	35°46′39″N 82°15′42″W	Locke Craig (1860–1925), North Carolina governor
Balsam Cone	6,611 ft/2,015 m	North-central Blacks	35°47′23″N 82°15′21″W	Fraser fir tree, previously known as balsam fir
Cattail Peak	6,583 ft/2,006 m	North-central Blacks	35°47′54″N 82°15′23″W	Possibly named for mountain lions that may have once frequented the summit
Big Tom	6,581 ft/2,006 m	South-central Blacks	35°46′47″N 82°15′35″W	Thomas "Big Tom" Wilson (1825–1909), legendary bear hunter and mountain guide
Mount Gibbes	6,560 ft/2,000 m	Southern Blacks	35°44′21″N 82°17′07″W	Robert Wilson Gibbes (1809–1866), surveyor
Clingmans Peak	6,540 ft/1,990 m	Southern Blacks	35°44′06″N 82°17′10″W	Thomas Lanier Clingman (1812–1897), politician and surveyor
Potato Hill	6,475 ft/1,974 m	North-central Blacks	35°48′06″N 82°15′11″W	
Potato Knob	6,420 ft/1,960 m	Southern Blacks	35°43′48″N 82°17′28″W	The mountain's shape, resembling an upright potato
Celo Knob	6,327 ft/1,928 m	Northern Blacks	35°51′09″N 82°14′55″W	Possibly the Cherokee word selu, meaning "corn."
Mount Hallback	6,320 ft/1,930 m	Southern Blacks	35°44′56″N 82°16′32″W	
Blackstock Knob	6,320 ft/1,930 m	Southern Blacks	35°44′17″N 82°19′07″W	Nehemiah Blackstock (1794–1880), surveyor
Gibbs Mountain	6,224 ft/1,897 m	Northern Blacks	35°50′27″N 82°14′53″W	Methodist circuit rider who frequented the area in the early 19th century
Winter Star Mountain	6,212 ft/1,893 m	Northern Blacks	35°49′04″N 82°14′57″W	
Big Butt	5,920 ft/1,800 m	Western Blacks	35°47′12″N 82°20′48″W	Also known as Yeates Knob. The nearest peak to the south is known as Little Butt.
The Pinnacle	5,665 ft/1,727 m	Southern Blacks	35°42′16″N 82°16′31″W	

== Geology ==
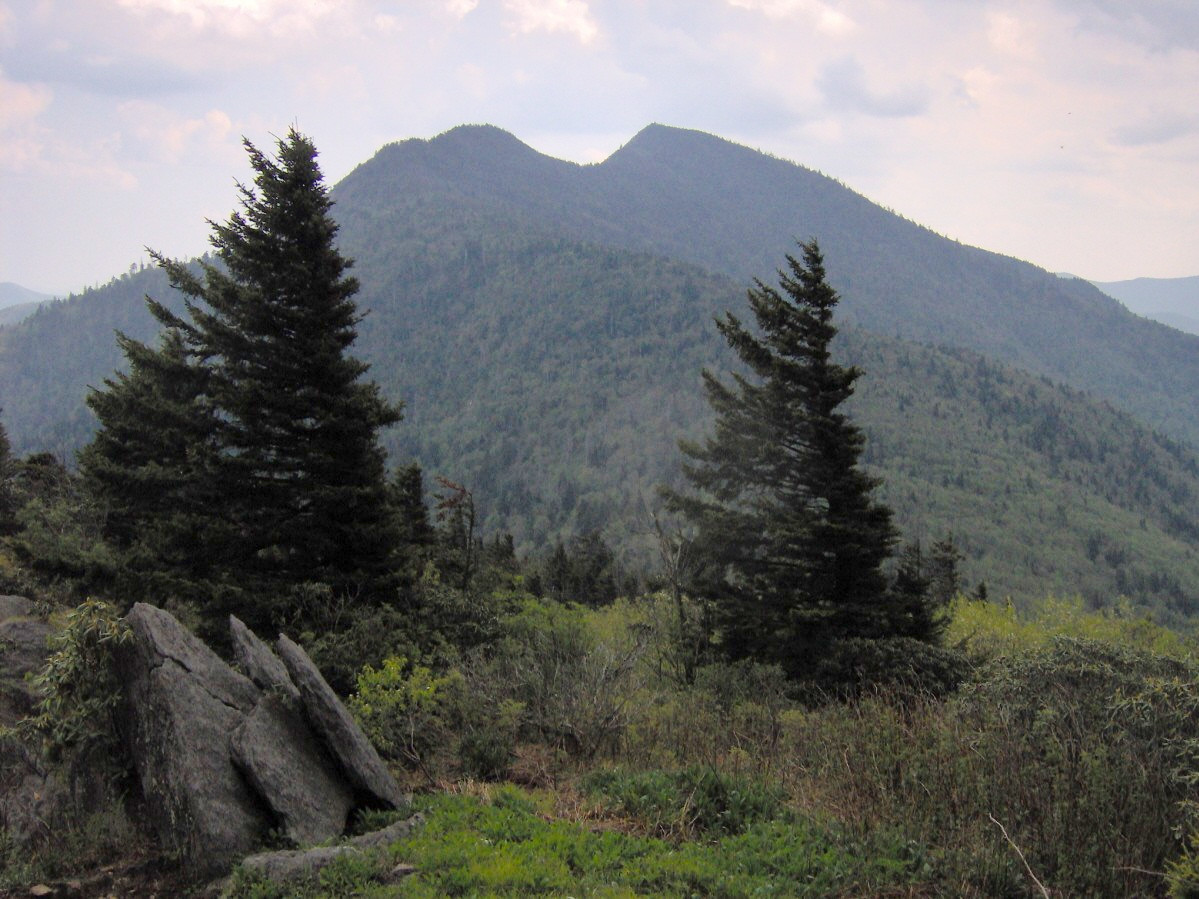
Potato Hill (left) and Cattail Peak (right), viewed from Winter Star Mountain

The Black Mountains consist primarily of Precambrian gneiss and schists formed over a billion years ago from primordial sea sediments. The mountains themselves were formed roughly 200–400 million years ago during the Alleghenian orogeny, when the collision of two continental plates thrust what is now the Appalachian Mountains upward to form a large plateau. Weathering and minor geologic events in subsequent periods carved out the mountains.

During the last ice age, approximately 20,000–16,000 years ago, glaciers did not advance into Southern Appalachia, but the change in temperatures drastically changed the forests in the region. A tree-less tundra likely existed in the Black Mountains and surrounding mountains in elevations above 3,500 feet (1,100 m). Spruce-fir forests dominated the lower elevations during this period, while hardwoods "fled" to warmer refuges in the coastal plains. As the ice sheets began retreating 16,000 years ago and temperatures started to rise, the hardwoods returned to the river valleys and lower slopes, and the spruce-fir forest retreated to the higher elevations. Today, the spruce-fir forest atop the Black Mountains is one of ten or so spruce-fir "islands" remaining in the mountains of Southern Appalachia.

== Plants and wildlife ==
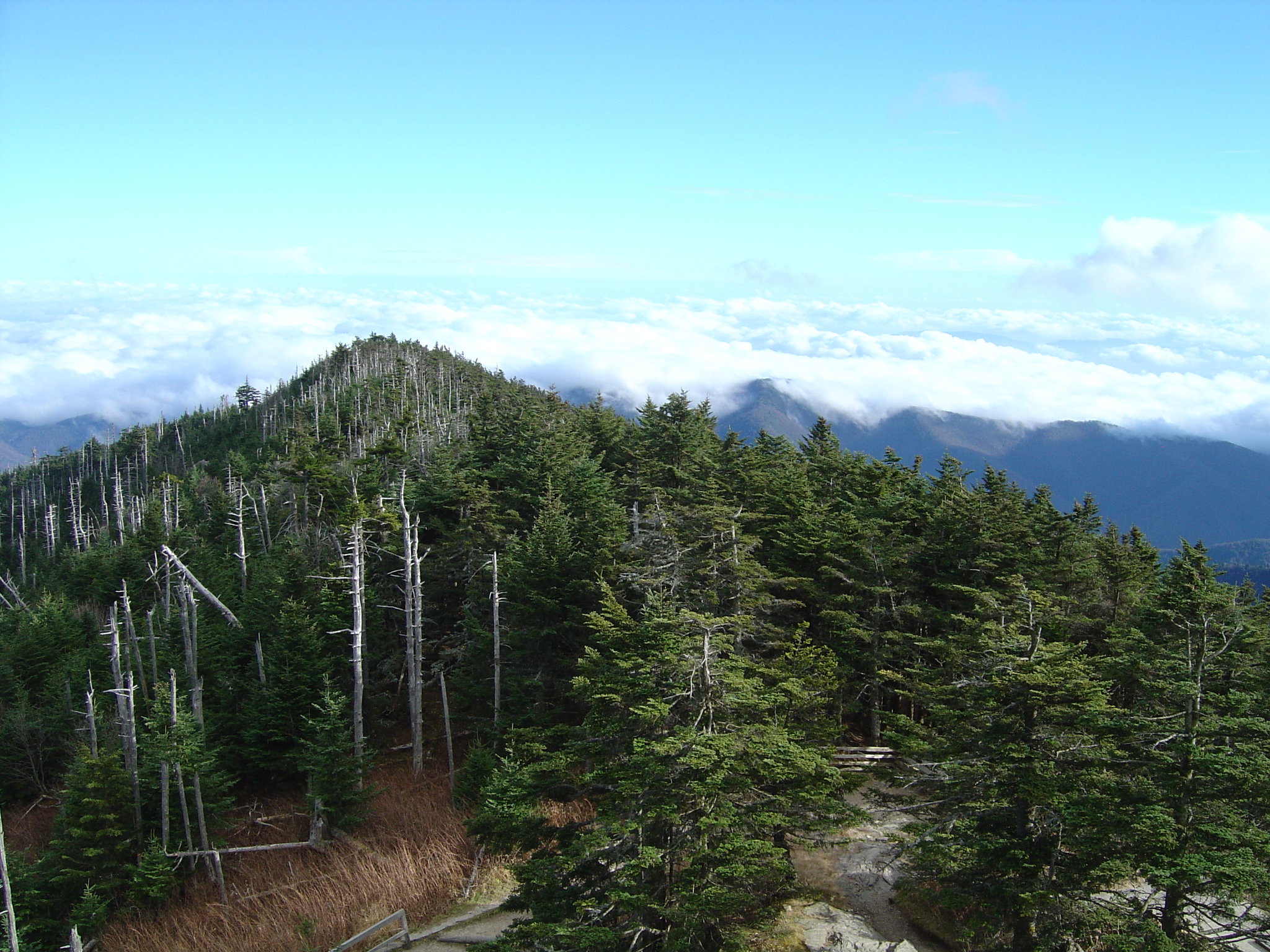
Spruce-fir stand on Mt. Mitchell

The forests of the Black Mountains are typically divided into three zones based on altitude: the spruce-fir forest, the northern hardwoods, and the Appalachian hardwoods. The southern Appalachian spruce-fir forest, though sometimes referred to as "boreal" or "Canadian," is a unique plant community endemic to a few high peaks of the Southern Appalachians. In fact, it is more akin to a high elevation cloud forest. It is dominated by red spruce and Fraser fir, and coats the elevations above 5,500 feet (1,700 m). The northern hardwoods, which consist primarily of beech, yellow birch, and buckeye, thrive between 4,500 and 5,500 feet (1,400 and 1,700 m). The more diverse Appalachian hardwoods, which include yellow poplar and various species of hickory, oak, and maple, dominate the slopes and stream valleys below 3,000 feet (910 m). Pine forests, consisting chiefly of Table Mountain pine, pitch pine, and Virginia pine, are found on the drier south-facing slopes. mountain paper birch, which is rare in North Carolina, grows sporadically on the slopes of Mount Mitchell.

Wildlife in the Black Mountains is typical of the Appalachian highlands. Mammals include black bears, white-tailed deer, raccoons, river otters, minks, bobcats, and the endangered northern flying squirrel. Bird species include the wild turkey, the northern saw-whet owl, and the pileated woodpecker, although peregrine falcons and various species of hawk are known to nest in the upper elevations. Brook trout, which are more typical of northern latitudes, are found in the streams at the base of the Black Mountains.

== History ==
=== Prehistory ===
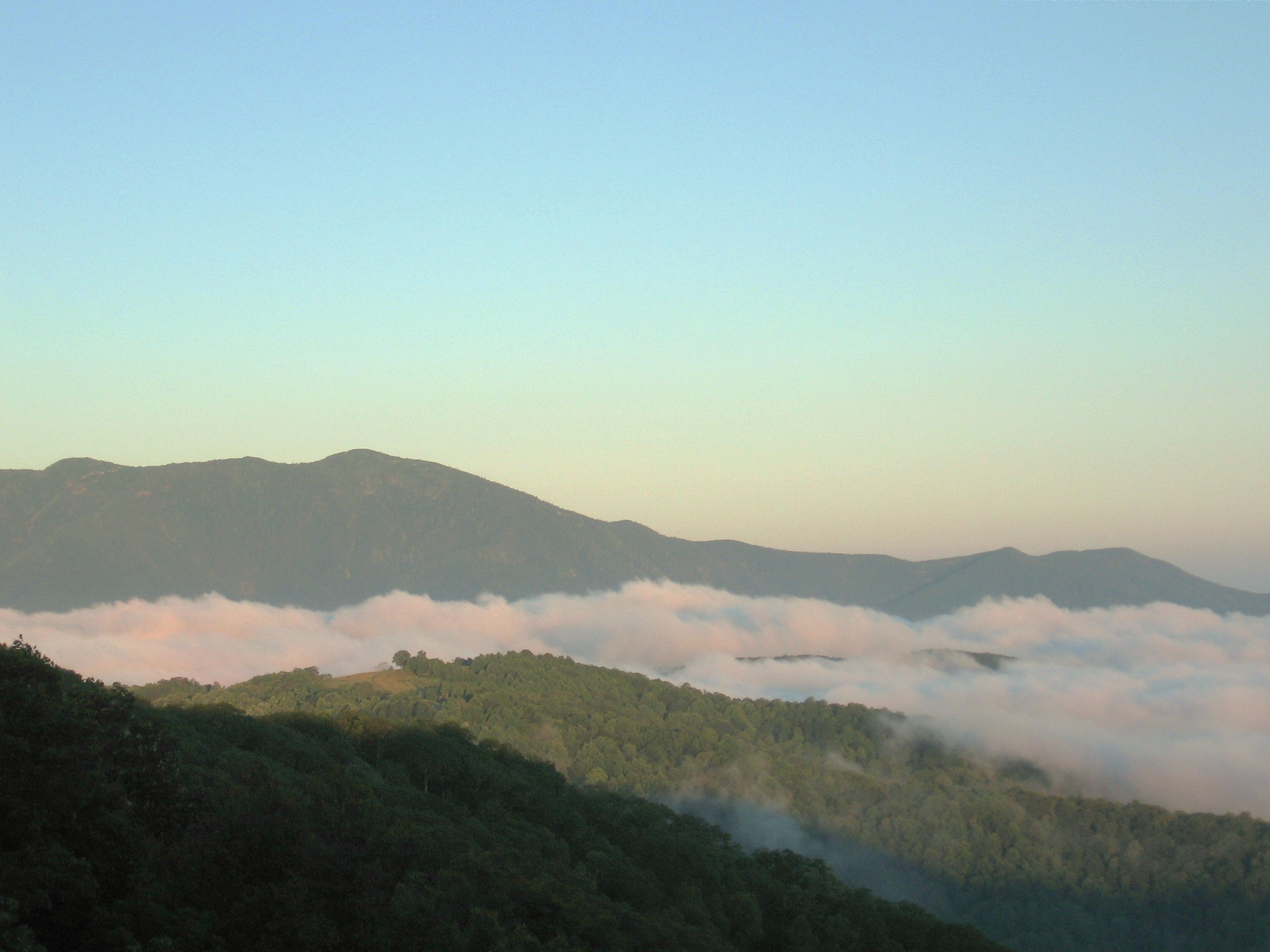
Celo Knob (left) and Little Celo (far right), viewed from Woody's Knob

Native Americans have likely been hunting in the Black Mountains for thousands of years. At Swannanoa Gap, just south of the range, archaeologists have uncovered evidence of habitation dating to the Archaic period (8000–1000 BC), the Woodland period (1000 BC – 1000 AD), and the Mississippian period (c. 900-1600 AD). The Mississippian-period village of Joara was located near the town of Morganton to the southeast.

The Hernando de Soto expedition, which was attempting to travel from the Florida coast to the Pacific Ocean, is believed to have passed through the North Toe River valley in May 1540, and thus would have included the first Europeans to see the Black Mountains. An expedition led by Juan Pardo probably crossed the Blue Ridge at Swannanoa Gap in October 1567. Both expeditions spent considerable time at Joara.

=== Early settlement ===
For much of the 18th century, the Black Mountains were a hunting ground on the eastern fringe of Cherokee territory. By 1785, however, the Cherokee had signed away ownership of the Black Mountains to the United States, and Euro-American settlers moved into the Cane and South Toe valleys shortly thereafter. The early settlers farmed the river valleys and sold animal furs, ginseng, tobacco, liquor, and excess crops at markets in nearby Asheville. The early farmers also brought large herds of cattle and hogs, which thrived in the valleys and mountain areas.

In 1789, French botanist André Michaux, who had been sent to America by the King of France to collect exotic plant specimens, made his first excursion into the Southern Appalachian Mountains, which included a brief trip to the Blacks. Michaux returned to the Blacks in August 1794, and collected several plant specimens that thrive above 4,000 feet (1,200 m). Michaux's findings, published in the early 19th century, were among the first to bring attention to the diversity and significance of the plants of Southern Appalachia.

=== Elisha Mitchell and Thomas Lanier Clingman ===
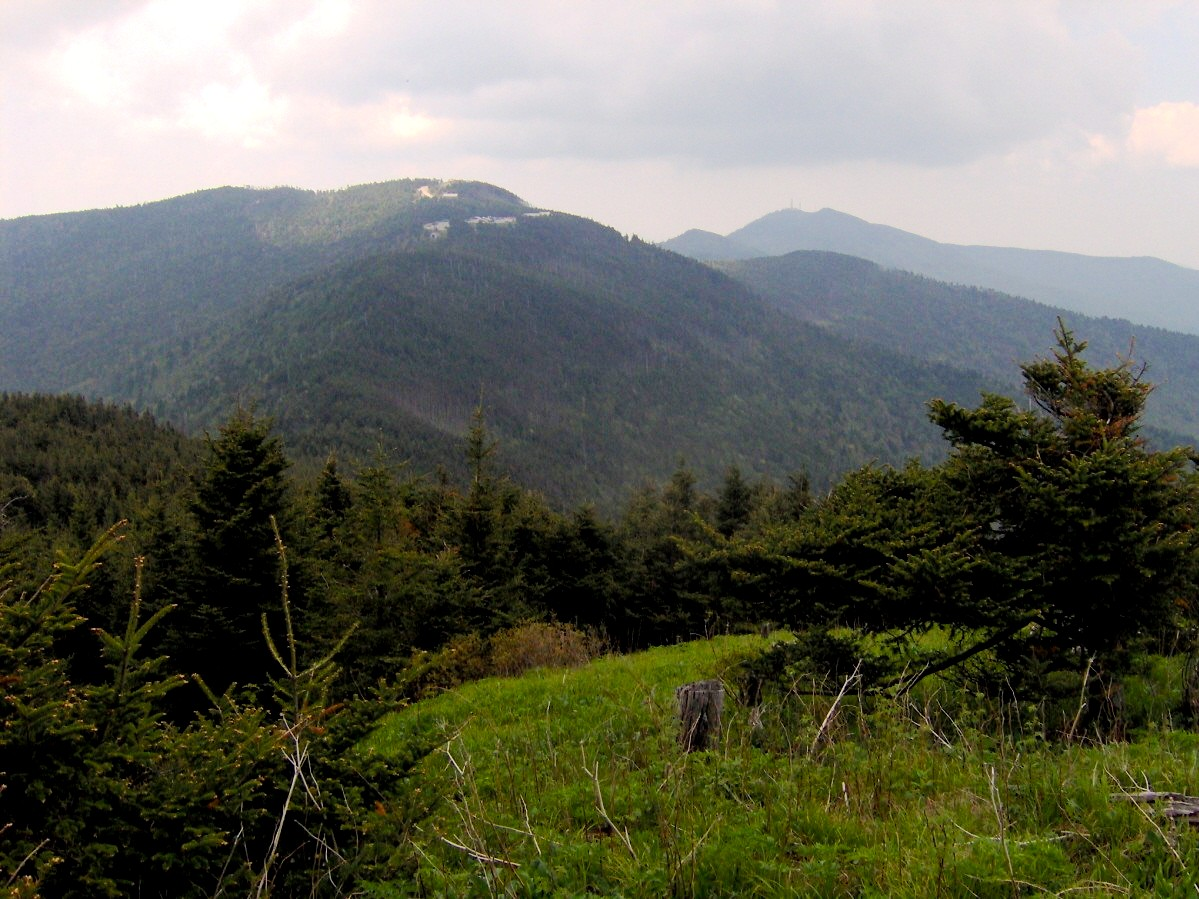
Mount Mitchell (foreground, left) and Clingmans Peak (background, right) viewed from Mount Craig

In the early 19th century, Mount Washington in New Hampshire was believed to be the highest summit in the Eastern United States, an assumption many North Carolinians began to question in light of Michaux's findings (Michaux believed that Grandfather Mountain was the highest). In 1835, the state dispatched North Carolina professor Elisha Mitchell (1793–1857) into the western part of the state to measure the elevation of Grandfather, the Roan Highlands, and the Black Mountains. Using a crude barometer, Mitchell gained measurements for Grandfather and Roan with apparent ease, although he struggled to discern which of the Blacks was the highest. After measuring Celo Knob, Mitchell descended to the Cane River Valley to obtain advice from the valley's residents. Two local guides (one of whom was William Wilson, a cousin of the later renowned mountain guide, Thomas "Big Tom" Wilson) led Mitchell up a bear trail to what they believed to be the highest summit. Although exactly which mountain they summited has long been disputed, it was likely Mount Gibbes, Clingmans Peak, or Mount Mitchell. Nevertheless, Mitchell obtained a measurement of 6,476 feet (1,974 m) (later determined to be too low), placing the Blacks at a higher elevation than Mount Washington and thus the highest in the Eastern United States.

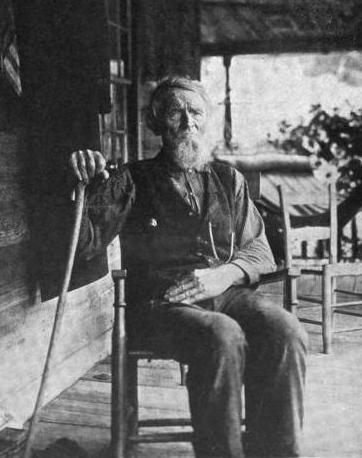
"Big Tom" Wilson

Mitchell returned to the Blacks in 1838 and 1844, gaining a higher measurement on each trip. Several surveyors visited the Blacks in subsequent years, including Nehemiah Blackstock (1794–1880) in 1845, Arnold Guyot (1807–1884) in 1849, and Robert Gibbes in the early 1850s. As early as Mitchell's third trip (1844) to the Blacks, the locals were calling what is now Clingmans Peak 35.735°N 82.286°W "Mount Mitchell", as they believed this was the summit measured by Mitchell as the highest. In 1855, Thomas Lanier Clingman (1812–1897), a politician and former student of Mitchell's, climbed a summit north of Stepps Gap known as Black Dome (what is now Mount Mitchell) and measured its elevation at 6,941 feet (2,116 m). Clingman reported his findings to Joseph Henry, the head of the Smithsonian Institution. Henry, using Guyot's more careful and accurate measurements taken several years earlier, agreed with Clingman that Black Dome was higher (although Guyot noted Clingman's measurement of 6,941 feet was off by 200 feet), and the highest mountain in the Appalachians was to be named for Clingman.

When Mitchell learned of Clingman's find, he claimed that the mountain he had measured in 1844 was, in fact, Black Dome, and that locals had mistakenly named the summit to the south (the modern Clingmans Peak) after him. Clingman rejected Mitchell's claim, arguing that the route Mitchell took led south of Stepps Gap (i.e., to what is now Mount Gibbes or Clingmans Peak) and that a broken barometer found by Blackstock on Mount Gibbes in 1845 could only have been Mitchell's. The two bickered back and forth in the local newspapers throughout 1856, each claiming to have been the first to summit and measure the higher Black Dome. The debate was intensified by the political climate of the 1850s, as Mitchell was a Whig supporter and Clingman had recently left the Whig party to join the pro-secession Democrats. Zebulon Vance, a Whig politician and friend of Mitchell's, located the two guides Mitchell had recruited for his 1844 excursion, and when the two described the route they had followed, it appeared that Mitchell had indeed summited Mount Gibbes. Finally, in 1857, Mitchell returned to the Blacks in an attempt to gain still more accurate measurements. One evening, while attempting to reach the Cane River Valley, he slipped and fell into a gorge along Sugar Camp Fork, near the waterfall that now bears his name. His body was found 11 days later by the legendary mountain guide Thomas "Big Tom" Wilson (1825–1909).

Mitchell's death sparked an outpouring of public sympathy across North Carolina. Zebulon Vance led a movement to verify Mitchell as the first to summit the highest mountain in the Eastern United States and to have the mountain named for him. Vance convinced several mountain guides to change previous statements and claim the route they had taken actually led to Black Dome, rather than Mount Gibbes. Mitchell was buried atop Black Dome on land donated by former governor David Lowry Swain. Clingman continued to deny that Mitchell had measured Black Dome first, but was unable to overcome the shift in public sentiment. By 1858, Black Dome had been renamed "Mitchell's High Peak." In subsequent decades, Mount Mitchell was renamed "Clingmans Peak", and Mitchell's High Peak was renamed "Mount Mitchell." Clingman eventually turned to the Great Smoky Mountains to the west, which he claimed were higher. Guyot's measurements in the Smokies rejected Clingman's assertions, although Guyot did manage to have the highest mountain in that range, known as Smoky Dome, renamed Clingmans Dome. It was later restored to its original Cherokee name, Kuwohi, on September 18, 2024.

=== Tourism and logging ===
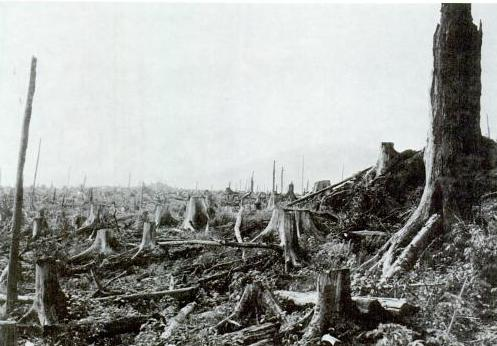
A logged slope of Mount Mitchell in 1923

The revelation that the Black Mountains were the highest in the Appalachian Range made them an immediate tourist attraction. By the 1850s, a lodge had been established in the southern part of the range, and locals such as Jesse Stepp and Tom Wilson had built several rustic cabins on the higher mountain slopes and were thriving as mountain guides. The American Civil War (1861–1865) brought a temporary halt to the tourism boom, but by the late 1870s, the industry had recovered. In the 1880s, brothers K.M. and David Murchison established a large game preserve in the Cane River Valley which was managed by Tom Wilson.

As forests in the north were cut down to meet the growing demand for lumber in the late 19th century, logging firms turned to the virgin forests of Southern Appalachia. Between 1908 and 1912, northern lumber firms, namely Dickey and Campbell (later Perley and Crockett), Brown Brothers, Carolina Spruce, and Champion Fibre, bought up timber rights to most of the Black Mountains and began a series of massive logging operations in the area. In 1911, Dickey and Campbell managed to construct a narrow-gauge railroad line connecting the Swannanoa Valley with Clingmans Peak. Other narrow-gauge lines quickly followed. Between 1909 and 1915, much of the forest on the upper slopes and crest was cut down. An increase in demand for red spruce during World War I led to the rapid deforestation of much of the spruce-fir forest in the higher elevations. As forests were removed, forest fires (caused by the ignition of dried brush and slash left by loggers) and erosion denuded what was left of the landscape.

=== The conservation movement ===
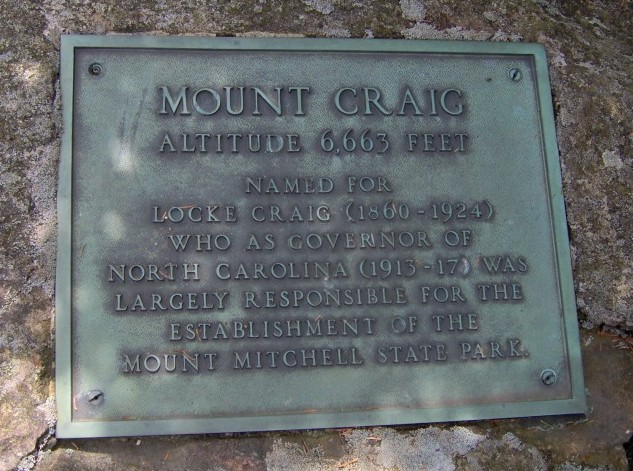
Plaque at the summit of Mount Craig honoring the mountain's namesake, Governor Locke Craig

Many North Carolinians, among them Governor Locke Craig and state forester John Simcox Holmes, were alarmed at the abusive logging practices that were stripping bare the Black Mountains. After the North Carolina state legislature rejected an initial attempt to create a state park at the summit of Mount Mitchell in 1913, Craig began negotiating with (and may have threatened) Perley and Crockett to preserve the forest atop Mitchell while he and Holmes lobbied for the creation of a state park. The state legislature finally approved the purchase of a stretch of land between Stepps Gap and the summit of what is now Big Tom in 1915, which became the core of Mount Mitchell State Park. The Pisgah National Forest, established in 1916, also began buying up and replanting lands that had been logged over.

In 1922, the Mount Mitchell Development Company (which had been formed by Fred Perley, a partner in Perley and Crockett) completed the first automobile road to Mount Mitchell, connecting the summit with the Swannanoa Valley. Adolphus and Ewart Wilson (the son and grandson of "Big Tom" Wilson) completed a road connecting the Cane River Valley with the summit of Mitchell shortly thereafter. The state eventually condemned the Wilsons' road, but allowed Ewart Wilson to operate an inn at Stepps Gap until the early 1960s. NC-128, which connects Mount Mitchell with the Blue Ridge Parkway, was completed in 1948.

== Environmental threats ==
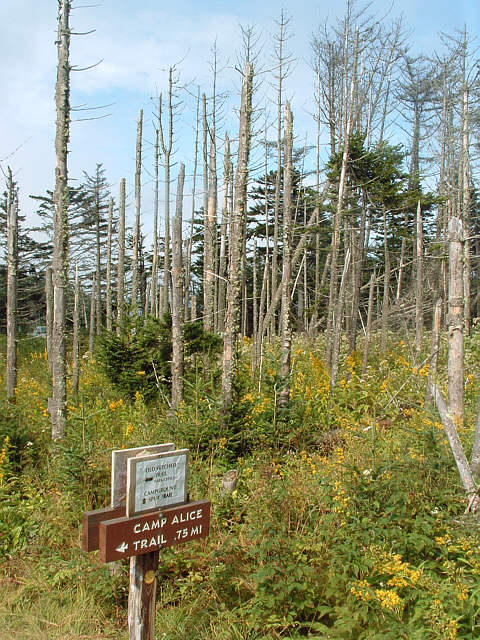
Dead trees on the crest of the Black Mountains, in Mount Mitchell State Park.

The Black Mountains, like many other ranges in the Appalachians, are currently threatened by acid rain and air pollution. Much of the range's once-famous red spruce and Fraser fir trees are dead or dying due in part to the pollution. A more significant threat to the firs, however, is the balsam woolly adelgid, an insect which may have an easier time killing the firs than it normally would due to them being weakened by the acid rain. In some recent studies, individual Fraser fir trees which are resistant to the adelgid have been found, lending hope to the possibility that these will again repopulate a healthy, mature fir forest at the mountains' highest elevations.

At lower elevations of the Black Mountains, eastern and Carolina hemlock trees grow on moist slopes near streams (a National Forest recreation area on the Toe River at the base of Mount Mitchell is called "Carolina Hemlocks" for this reason). These too are under attack by an introduced pest, the hemlock woolly adelgid. Arriving only in the last few growing seasons, the health of the hemlocks in the region is rapidly declining. Research is currently underway in releasing predator beetles that will, hopefully, eat enough adelgids to balance their population and allow the hemlocks to flourish.

The area around the Black Mountains is also experiencing rapid population growth as retirees from other states pour into the region. Due to a lack of zoning laws, this has resulted in rapid development of ridgetop cabins, large second-homes on the lower ridges, and deforestation that threatens the natural beauty of the region. The Clean Smokestacks Act of 2002 (S.L. 2002–4), enacted by the North Carolina General Assembly, is credited with reducing the amount of particulate and ozone pollution that had once threatened the views in the Black Mountains and throughout the Appalachians. Nitrogen Oxide emissions have plummeted from over 245,000 tons a year in 1998 to under 25,000 by 2014. Sulfur dioxide emissions saw a 64% decline. Fine particulates emissions in the area are now less than 60% of the national standard. Views which had been reduced to less than 10 miles by the late 1990s due to chronically hazy conditions, have been restored to 39 miles and the number of clear days has substantially increased.

== Photo gallery ==
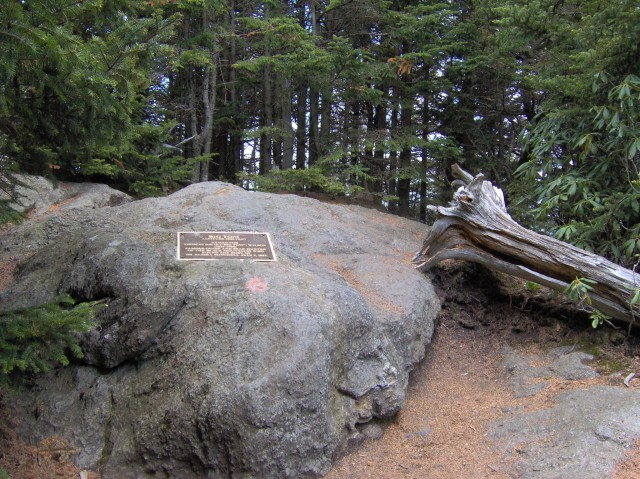
The summit of Big Tom

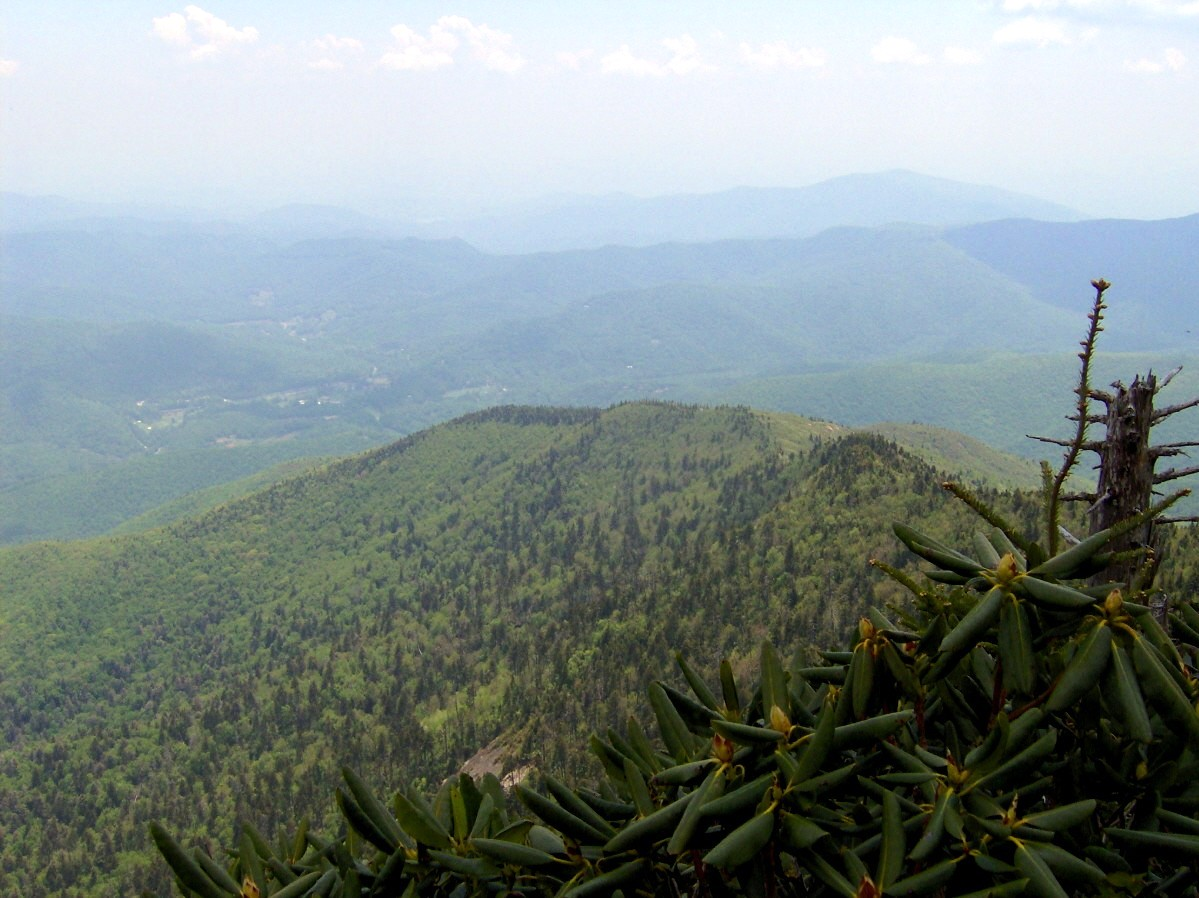
The South Toe Valley, viewed from the summit of Balsam Cone

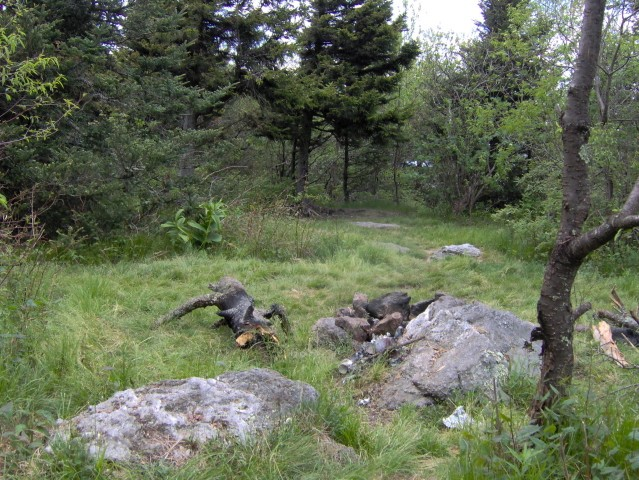
Backcountry campsite at Deep Gap

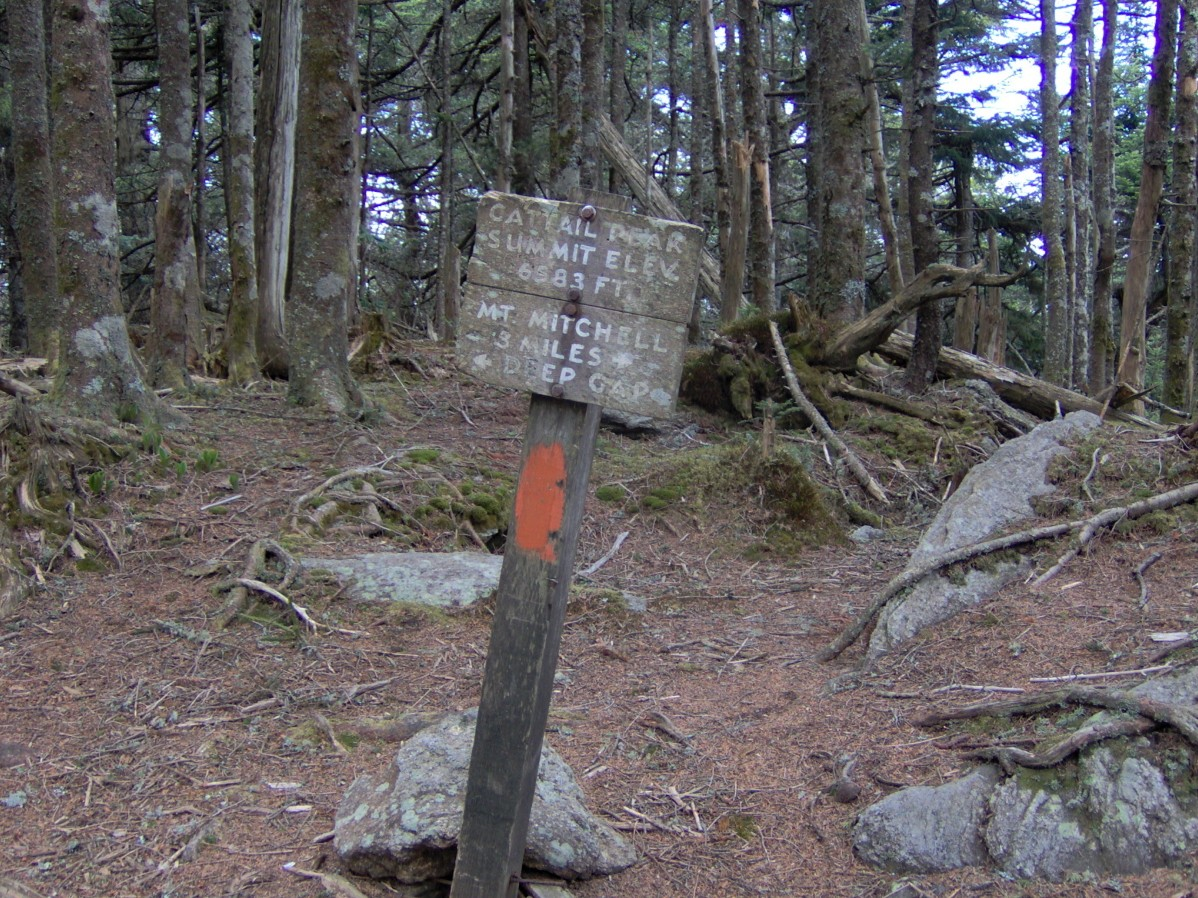
Sign marking the summit of Cattail Peak

== See also ==
- List of mountains in North Carolina
- List of subranges of the Appalachian Mountains

== General sources ==
- Walter C. Biggs and James F. Parnell (1989). State Parks of North Carolina. John F. Blair.
