= Linn Cove Viaduct =

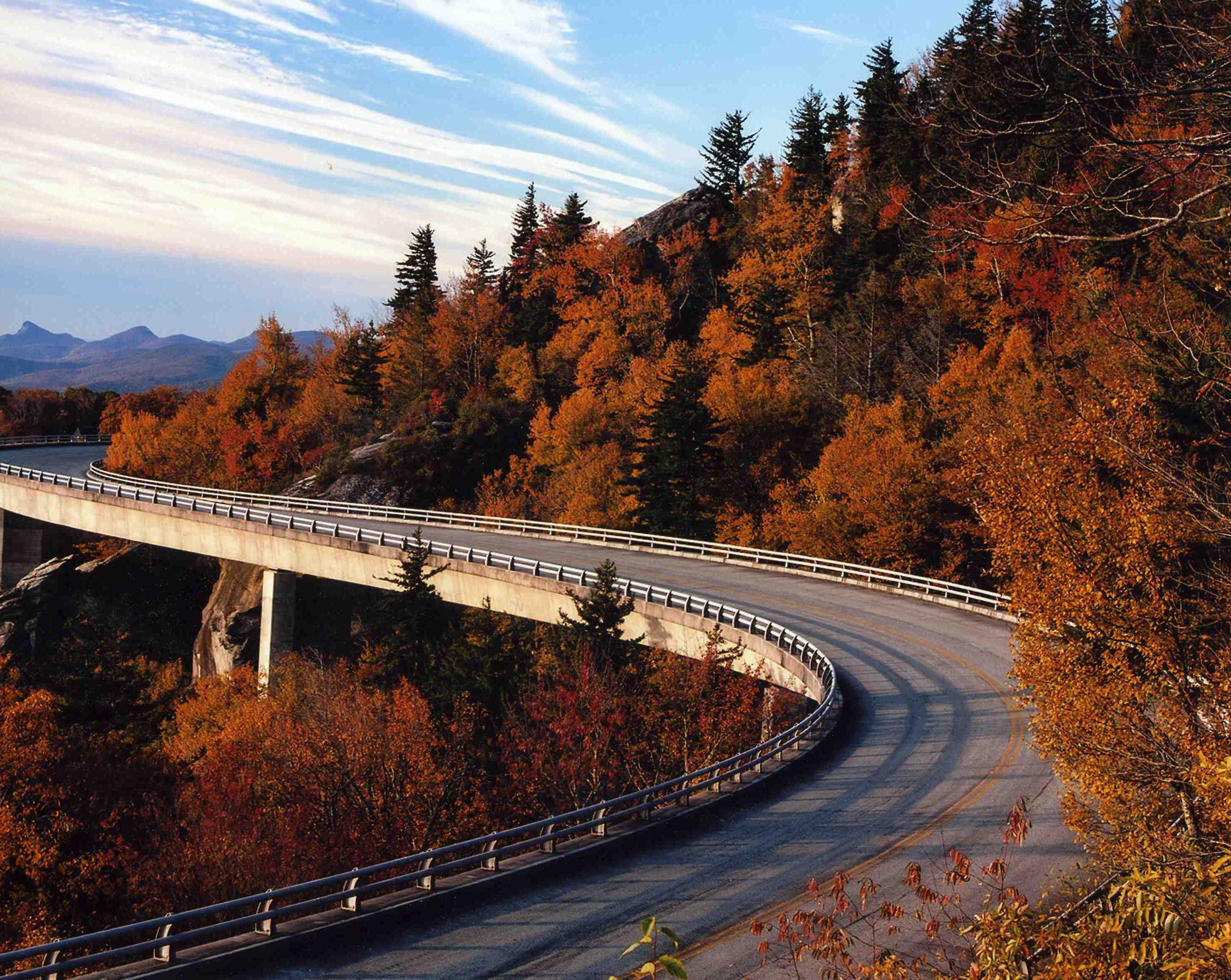
- Coordinates: 36.09513°N 81.81223°W
- Carries: Blue Ridge Parkway
- Crosses: Linn Cove of Grandfather Mountain
- Locale: Avery County, NC
- Owner: National Park Service
- Maintained by: National Park Service

Characteristics
- Design: Segmental bridge
- Material: Concrete
- Total length: 1,243 feet (379 m)
- Width: 39.5 feet (12.0 m)
- Longest span: 180.1 feet (54.9 m)

History
- Designer: Figg & Muller Engineering Group
- Constructed by: Jasper Construction Co.
- Construction start: 1979
- Construction end: 1983
- Construction cost: $10 million
- Inaugurated: September 11, 1987

Location
- Interactive map of Linn Cove Viaduct

The Linn Cove Viaduct is a 1,243-foot-long (379 m), concrete segmental bridge which snakes around Grandfather Mountain in western North Carolina. Completed in 1983 at a cost of $10 million, it was one of the last major construction projects on the Blue Ridge Parkway which runs 469 miles (755 km) linking Shenandoah National Park to Great Smoky Mountains National Park. Built mostly along the spine of the Blue Ridge, the parkway was fully completed and opened for through traffic in 1987.

== History ==
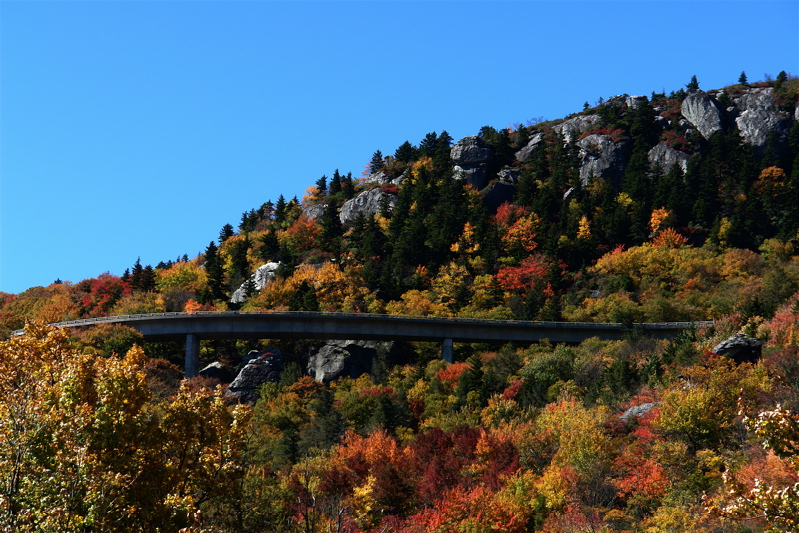
Viaduct Setting

Construction of the parkway began in 1935 with the initial plan calling for a viaduct given the effects that a traditional cut-and-fill road would have on Grandfather Mountain. Towering almost 6,000 feet (1,800 m), this mountain is the most rugged peak on the Blue Ridge and geologically the most ancient mountain on the North American continent. Conservationists who hoped to preserve the area as a mountain park/recreation area were behind the viaduct concept as they stressed the danger of irreparable damage by lumbering and other exploitation, along with the need to preserve the view of the mountain as it then existed. By 1966, the parkway was essentially complete except for the 7.7-mile (12.4 km) section that circled around Grandfather Mountain despite the concerted efforts of the government to acquire the needed property, a task which eventually took 40 years.

== Design and construction ==
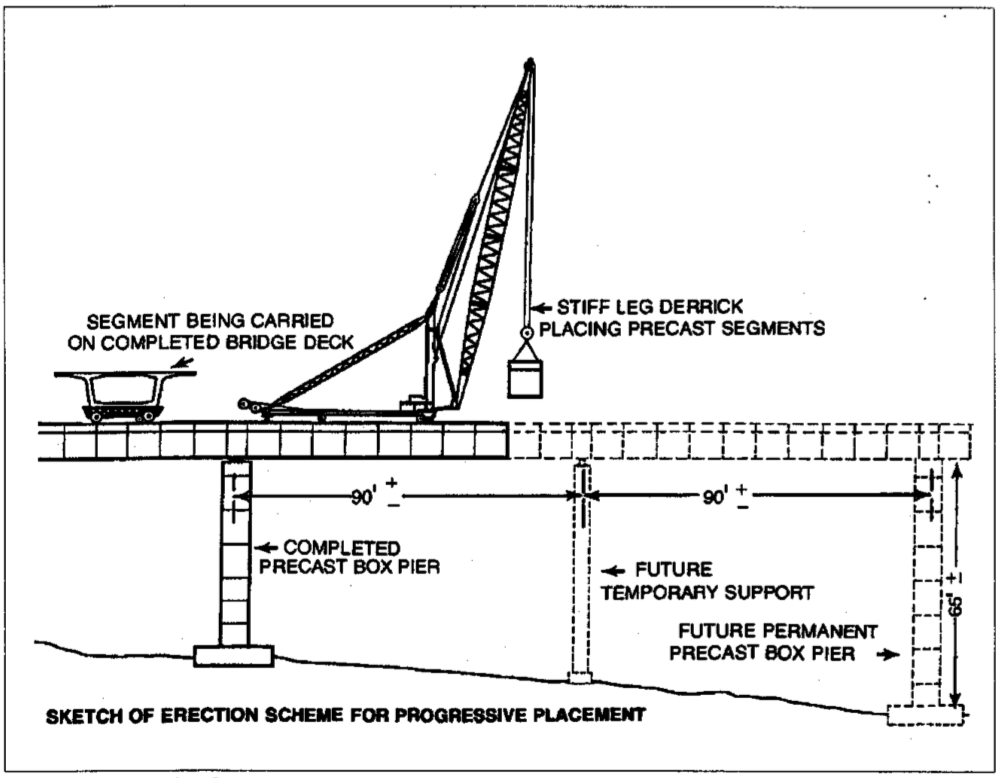
Viaduct Erection Scheme

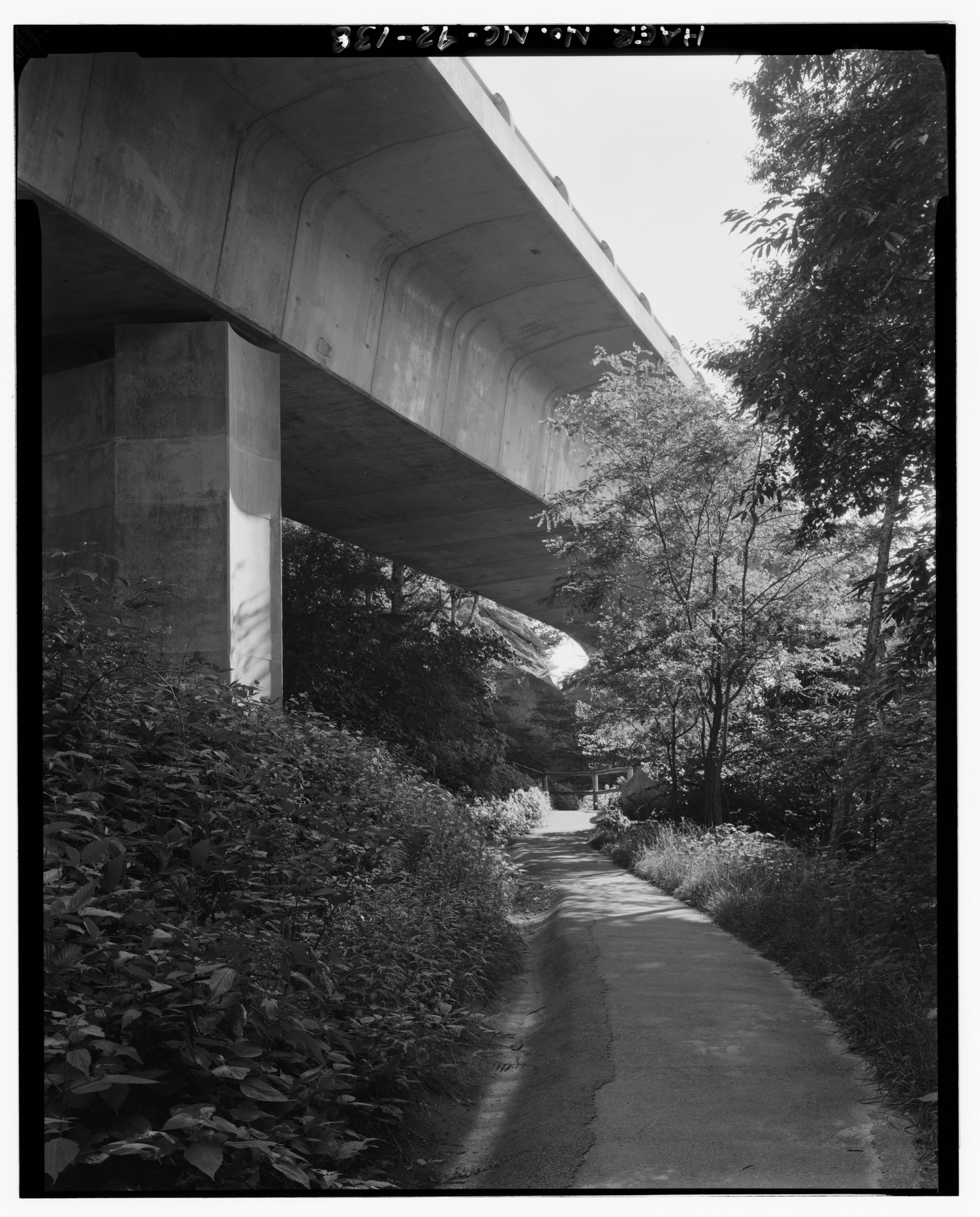
Viaduct/Tanawha Trail

The viaduct was designed by Figg and Muller Engineers, Inc., with construction beginning in 1979. Some 1,243 feet (379 m) long and a little less than 40 feet (12 m) wide, the viaduct rests on seven piers. What made its construction noteworthy was keeping heavy construction equipment off the ground. This included the preliminary geotechnical exploration/evaluation work begun in 1975 where crews hiked to the site and drilling equipment was lowered to each bore-hole location by helicopter. Building the bridge from its south side, this was done by connecting 153 segments one at a time using a custom crane that moved along the viaduct as it was being built. Each segment, nominally 8.5 feet (2.6 m) long and weighing 50 tons, was precast at a facility onsite and moved on a carriage to the crane. All but one of these segments were slightly curved as the viaduct needed to be shaped in a "S-and-a-half" figure to follow the contours of the mountain. The only work done on the ground involved drilling the footings for the piers which also were built in a segmental manner. The viaduct has received numerous design awards to include the 1984 President's Design Award, which states, "... construction of the roadway by pre-cast, segmental concrete elements set from above on segmental piers is elegant, economical, and new… results in an elegant curving ribbon that caresses the terrain without using it as a support. It gives the motorist the sensation of driving tantalizing on air while the earth goes by."

== Environs ==
The National Park Service operates the Linn Cove Visitor Center at the viaduct's south end which also features a bridge museum and provides access to the Tanawha Trail which runs from Beacon Heights to Julian Price Memorial Park.

== See also ==
- List of bridges documented by the Historic American Engineering Record in North Carolina
