= Saints Peter and Paul Orthodox Church =

Russian Orthodox church in North Carolina, US

Saints Peter and Paul Russian Orthodox Church
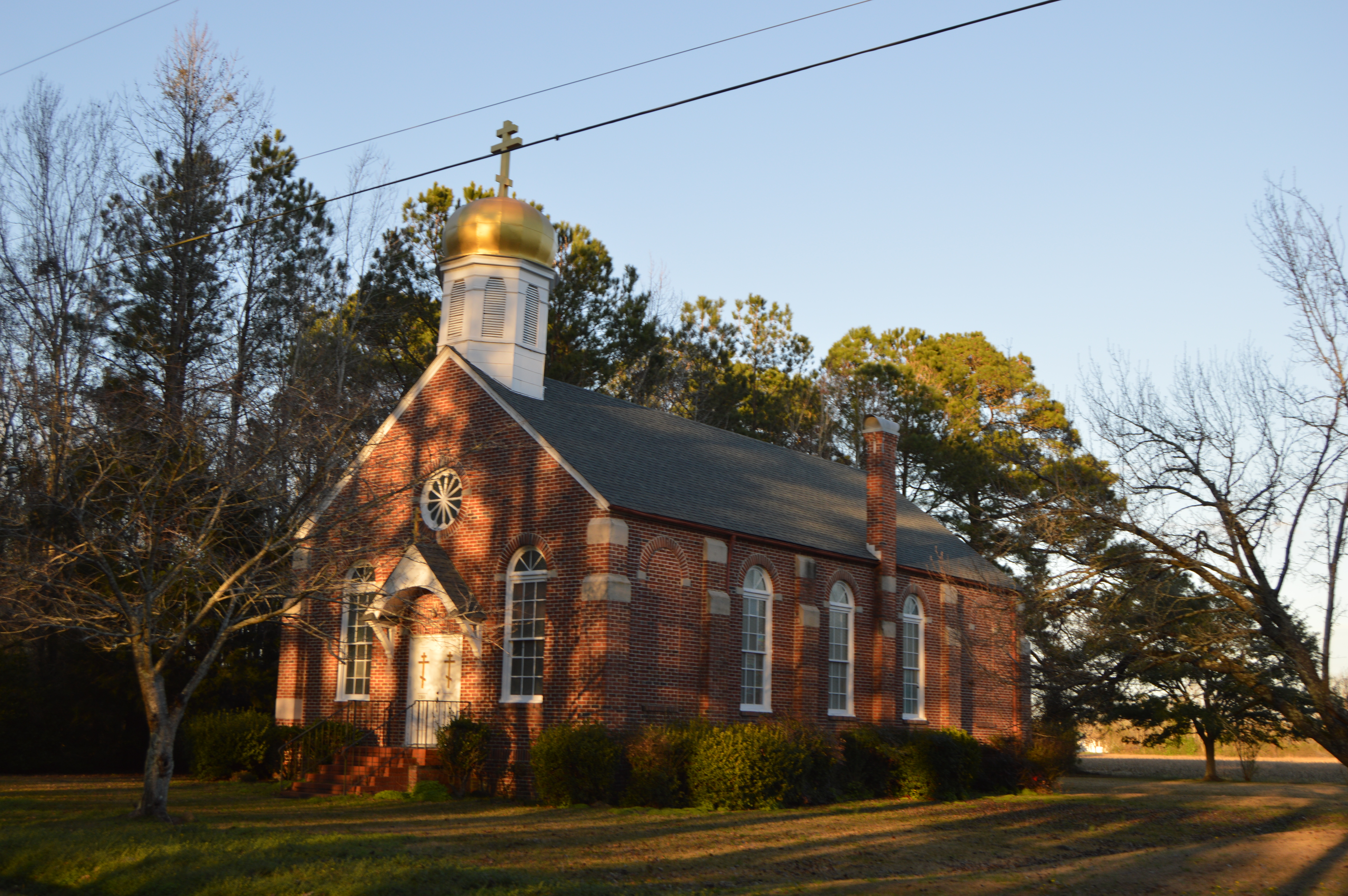
- Saints Peter and Paul Russian Orthodox Church
- 34°30′53″N 77°54′53″W
- Location: 2384 Front Street, St. Helena, North Carolina
- Country: United States
- Denomination: Russian Orthodox (historically Greek Catholic affiliation noted)

Architecture
- Style: Russian Orthodox with American church influences
- Groundbreaking: August 1932

Specifications
- Materials: Red brick, wood, metal (onion dome), glass

Saints Peter and Paul Orthodox Church is an Orthodox church located in St. Helena in Pender County, North Carolina and it is the oldest Orthodox church in North Carolina.

== History ==
The history of the church goes back more than 110 years to founding of St. Helena when realtor Hugh MacRae founded the town. Between the years of 1923 and 1932 families from Galicia migrated to the community. These migrants eventually reached a population that attracted the services of Ukrainian-born American Orthodox priest John Boruch. Construction of the church began in August 1932 with the building completed in 1933 on a tract donated by MacRae. Boruch's daughter Olga assisted in designing the church. John Boruch died in 1969 at age 92 and is buried at the church.
