= Julian Price Memorial Park =

Park in Watauga County, North Carolina, United States

Coordinates: 36°08′18″N 81°43′53″W

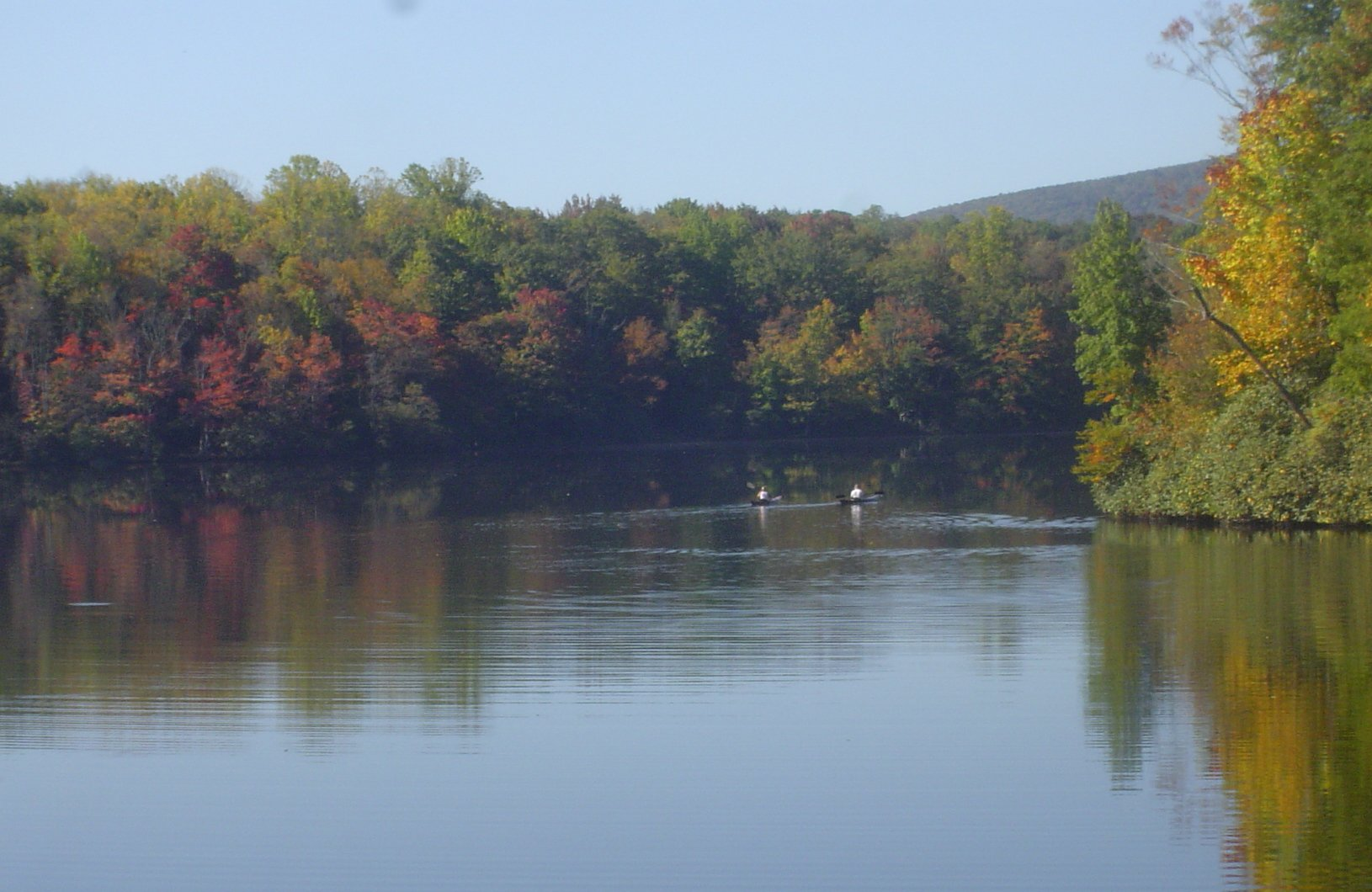
Price Lake

Julian Price Memorial Park is a park of 4,200 acres (17 km^{2}) at the foot of Grandfather Mountain in North Carolina, named in honor of Julian Price. It is at milepost 297 on the Blue Ridge Parkway and directly adjacent to the Moses H. Cone Memorial Park. Together these parks comprise the largest developed area set aside for public recreation on the Parkway. The park is managed by the National Park Service which received the lands from the Jefferson Pilot Standard Life Insurance Company shortly after Price's death when they received it through his will. The grounds are also known for the fact that the nation's largest National Lumberjack Association rally is held here annually.

== Overview ==
Price was an insurance executive who purchased the acreage in the late 1930s and 1940s to create a retreat for the employees of his insurance company. His premature death in 1946 postponed these plans and the lands were deeded over to his company. They in turn donated the lands to the National Park Service / Blue Ridge Parkway for public recreational use with the cooperation and approval of Price's son and daughter.

The donor of the lands requested that Boone Fork be dammed to create a lake in Julian Prices' honor, which is now called Price Lake. The Blue Ridge Parkway goes over the top of the dam. The 47-acre (190,000 m^{2}) lake is visible from the road and is stocked with various fish. Among wildlife around the man-made lake are beavers, ducks, and frogs.

The park provides over 100 picnic sites, various campgrounds, rest rooms, nature walks, hiking trails, and a 300-seat amphitheater. Visitors can also rent canoes and boats for use on Price Lake. Many residents of the towns of Boone and Blowing Rock, which are nearby, partake in fishing, hiking, and canoeing in the park. The park has the largest campground on the Blue Ridge Parkway, as well as a popular picnic facility. This land was obtained in Price's will first by the Moses H. Cone Memorial Hospital and a few years later donated to the National Park Service on the condition that it be developed out as a public recreational area. It is directly adjacent to Moses H. Cone Memorial Park and together they are the largest developed recreational areas for public use on the Blue Ridge Parkway.

== Trails ==
- The park has a total of seven trails.
- There is a 2.5-mile (4.0 km) loop trail around Price Lake rated easy.
- The Boone Fork Loop Trail is five miles (8 km) and considered challenging.
- The Tanawha Trail is 13.5 miles (21.7 km). It passes under the Linn Cove Viaduct and wraps around Grandfather Mountain. It constitutes a section of the North Carolina Mountains-to-Sea Trail.
- The sign at the trailhead of Price Lake reads:

Julian Price Memorial Park

The Julian Price Memorial Park, comprising 4,200 acres (17 km^{2}), is named in honor of its former owner, the late Julian Price, for many years president of the Jefferson Standard Life Insurance Company of Greensboro, NC. The company and Mr. Price's son and daughter, Ralph C. Price and Mrs. Joseph McKinley Bryan, cooperated in the acquisition and dedication of this property as a public recreation area for all to enjoy.

== Virtual tours ==
- Google maps
- Price Lake
- Price Lake Trail # 1
- Price Lake Trail # 2
- Price Lake & Park - Fishing
- Price Lake & Park Canoe Rentals
- Price Lake & Park Tent Campground
- Price Lake & Park RV Campgrounds

== See also ==
- Map of park trails from the National Park Service
