= Hugh Morton (photographer) =

American photographer and conservationist

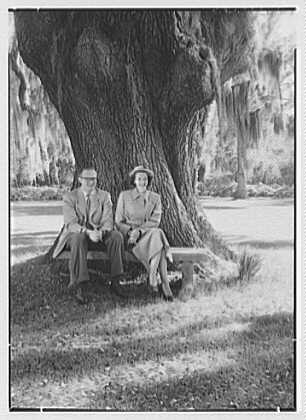
- Mr. and Mrs. Hugh Morton, in Wilmington, NC
- Born: February 19, 1921; Wilmington, North Carolina, U.S.
- Died: June 1, 2006 (aged 85); Linville, North Carolina, U.S.
- Known for: Photography, conservation
- Spouse: Julia Taylor Morton

Hugh MacRae Morton (February 19, 1921 – June 1, 2006) was a photographer and nature conservationist who developed Grandfather Mountain in North Carolina.

== Personal life ==
Morton was born on February 19, 1921, in Wilmington, North Carolina, the grandson of local businessman and politician Hugh MacRae, and the great-grandson of Brigadier General William MacRae of the Confederate States Army during the American Civil War.

Hugh MacRae Morton entered the University of North Carolina in 1940 and took photographs for the student newspaper, The Daily Tar Heel. He left school in 1942 to fight in World War II. In 1942, he joined the Signal Corps (United States Army) as a photographer and was sent to the Pacific Theater. After he returned to the United States, Morton married Julia Taylor in 1945 and they had four children. Morton was well known in North Carolina as a fan of University of North Carolina at Chapel Hill sports and friend of many influential North Carolinians. Morton authored two books of his photography: Hugh Morton's North Carolina (University of North Carolina Press, 2003) and Hugh Morton: North Carolina Photographer, which was published in 2006.

== Grandfather Mountain ==
Morton's great-grandfather, Donald MacRae, bought the development rights for the 16,000 acres (65 km^{2}) around Grandfather Mountain in 1889 from Walter Waightstill Lenoir, grandson of General William Lenoir. In 1952 Morton inherited more than 4,000 acres on Grandfather Mountain from his grandfather, Hugh MacRae, and immediately set out on making the property more accessible to tourists. In 1952 Morton extended and improved a vehicle road to the top of the mountain, and erected the original Mile High Swinging Bridge to provide visitor access to one of the most spectacular scenic vistas in the southeastern United States. The Mile High Swinging Bridge is a 228-foot-long (69 m) bridge that spans a chasm at exactly one mile of elevation and has killed 7 people from falling off the bridge. In 1968, Morton bought two black bears, one male and one female, to release back into the wild as part of a re-population effort; however, the female bear, named Mildred, would not adapt to the wild, and was required to be recaptured and given an enclosed habitat, which was finished in 1973. The Grandfather Mountain Animal Habitats now contain black bears, deer, eagles, river otters and mountain lions. In 1993 Grandfather Mountain became the first privately owned property in the world to receive UNESCO recognition as an International Biosphere Reserve. Two years after Hugh Morton died in 2006, his family sold approximately 2,650 acres of the mountain's protected wilderness to the state of North Carolina for $12 million, along with a conservation easement on approximately 700 acres that the Morton family gifted to the Grandfather Mountain Stewardship Foundation. The 2,650-acre tract purchased by the state includes Calloway Peak, elevation 5,946 feet, and was turned into North Carolina's 34th state park, Grandfather Mountain State Park, officially receiving that status in April 2009.

== Photography ==
Morton was a prolific photographer who took photographs of all aspects of life in North Carolina. His first published photograph came in 1935, when he was 14; a picture he took of a golfing scene was published as a North Carolina travel advertisement in Time Magazine. During his time at the University of North Carolina, he was a photographer for the student newspaper, the Daily Tar Heel. During World War II, Morton joined as a member of the Signal Corps, where he was assigned the job of newsreel photographer. He was sent to New Caledonia, an island off the coast of Australia, where he was attached to the 37th Infantry Division. Near the end of the war, Morton was assigned to take pictures of General Douglas MacArthur when MacArthur's regular photographer was sick. While on the island of Luzon in the Philippines, Morton was injured by a Japanese explosive and was awarded the Bronze Star and the Purple Heart.

Upon his return from the war, Morton went to work at the University of North Carolina as a sports photographer. He took pictures of sports at the University of North Carolina for over six decades; one anecdote says that people at UNC basketball games were warned not to block the view of "Mr. Morton's seat." In 1949, Morton was elected the president of the Carolina Photographers Association. The next year, Morton became the chairman of the Southern Short Courses in News Photography. That program continues across the state of North Carolina at college campuses and at Grandfather Mountain as the Grandfather Mountain Camera Clinic.

Morton's work has been featured in magazines such as Life, National Geographic, the Associated Press, Esquire, Time, and many other publications. One of his favorite locations was Grandfather Mountain and one of his favorite subjects was Mildred the Bear. He took thousands of pictures of Mildred alone. In addition to photography, Morton was also a filmmaker.

Morton's photographic and film life's work has been donated to North Carolina Collection Photographic Archives in Wilson Library at the University of North Carolina at Chapel Hill. This collection is currently being digitized, a project which is being chronicled on the A View To Hugh blog.
