= Tanawha Trail =

Trail in North Carolina, USA

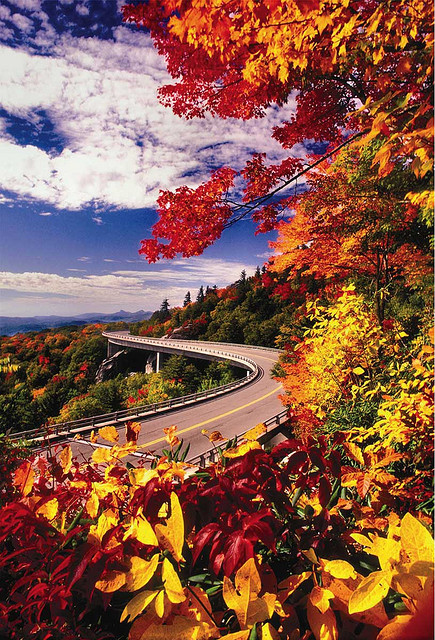
- View of the Linn Cove Viaduct from an overlook on the Tanawha Trail.
- Length: 13.5 miles (21.7 km)
- Location: North Carolina, United States
- Designation: Mountains-to-Sea Trail
- Trailheads: Julian Price Park Campground; Beacon Heights
- Use: Hiking
- Difficulty: Easy to moderate
- Sights: Appalachian Mountains; Grandfather Mountain; Linn Cove Viaduct
- Hazards: American black bear Diarrhea from water Mosquitos; Poison ivy Severe weather Steep grades Venomous snakes Yellowjackets; Livestock
- Surface: natural, boardwalk, asphalt

The Tanawha Trail extends for 13.5 miles (21.7 km) from Julian Price Park to Beacon Heights in North Carolina. The name "Tanawha" derives from the Cherokee word for a mythical hawk or eagle. Completed in 1993, the trail, like the nearby final section of the Blue Ridge Parkway, traverses a variety of geological and biological landscapes.

Much of the Tanawha Trail is incorporated into North Carolina's Mountains-to-Sea Trail (MST), which spans the state from the Great Smoky Mountains to the Outer Banks.

== History ==
The Tanawha Trail was completed in 1993 and was designed specifically for hiking.

== Navigation ==
The Tanawha Trail is blazed with a hawk feather icon displayed on small metal signs. Many of these signs also include the white dot icon of the Mountains-to-Sea Trail, indicating sections where the two trails overlap. Junctions with side and connecting trails are marked with signs, although those trails may not be blazed.

== Camping ==
Camping is not permitted on the Tanawha Trail. The northeastern trailhead is located within Price Park's campground, which is open from May to October. The southwestern trailhead is near the Pisgah National Forest, where dispersed camping is allowed along the Mountains-to-Sea Trail. The Tanawha Trail also serves as the primary access to the eastern trails of Grandfather Mountain State Park, which contain designated primitive campsites.

== Route ==
The southwestern trailhead is located at the Blue Ridge Parkway's Beacon Heights Overlook. Shortly past the overlook, the Mountains-to-Sea Trail (MST) joins the Tanawha Trail after ascending Beacon Heights from the Pisgah National Forest. From there, the combined trails follow wooded terrain alongside the Blue Ridge Parkway to the Linn Cove Visitor Center.

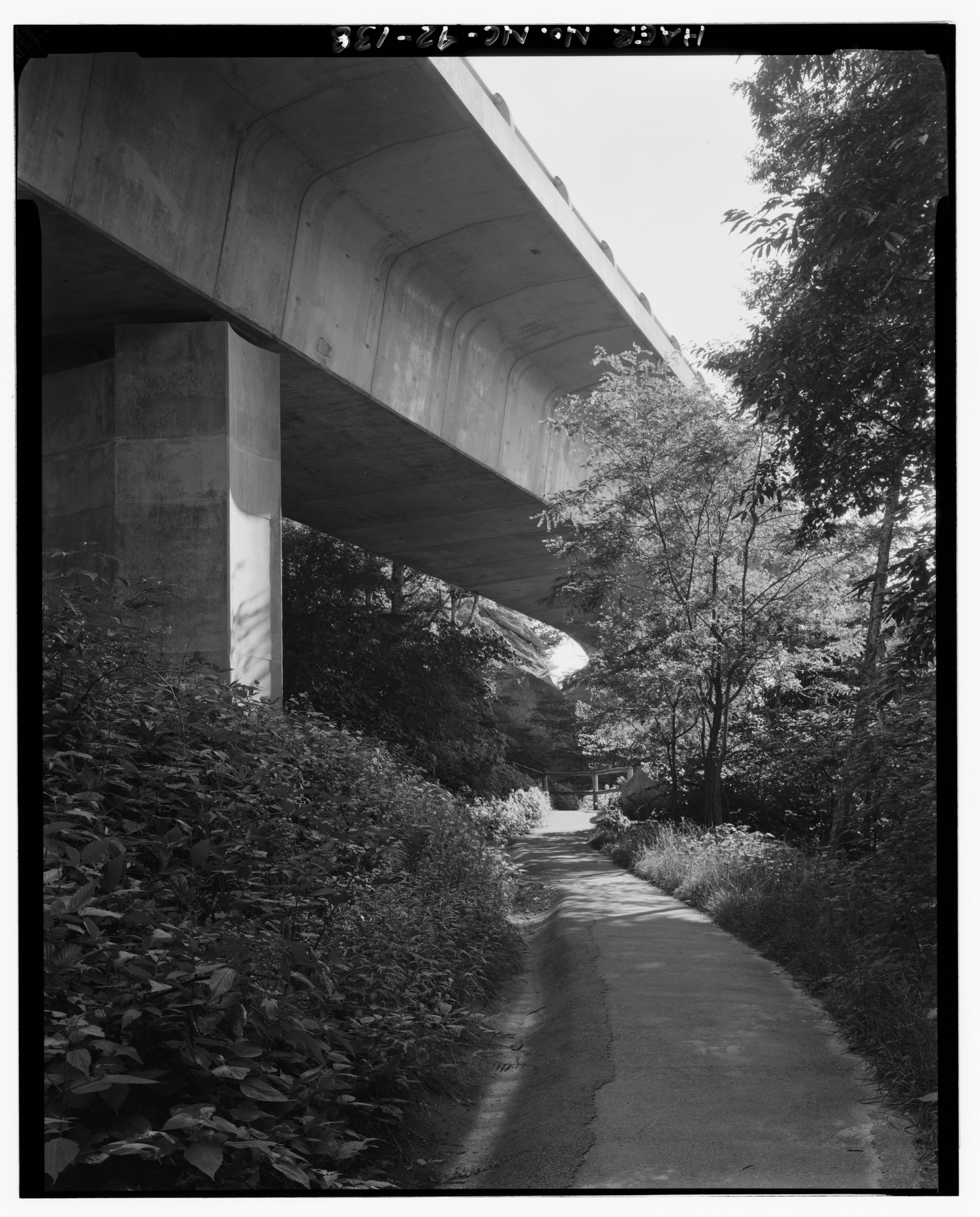
The Tanawha Trail as it passes beneath the Linn Cove Viaduct.

From the visitor center, the Tanawha Trail passes under the Linn Cove Viaduct and ascends steeply via stone steps beside a large boulder wall. The trail then levels off and enters a shaded glen dominated by birch and beech trees. Beyond the cascading waters of Wilson Creek, the trail crosses a clearing with large rock formations. This section of the trail is accented with flat stones, resembling a flagstone path.

The trail climbs sharply to Rough Ridge and continues over a 200-foot (61 m) boardwalk. From this vantage point, the view of the Piedmont is unobstructed due to the presence of low-growing and fragile mountain-heather ecosystems. The site also offers views of the Linn Cove Viaduct and several peaks, including Grandmother Mountain, Hawksbill, and Table Rock.

The trail continues through a spruce and hemlock forest into a glen reminiscent of New England, characterized by rocky terrain and stands of poplar, yellow birch, and oak.

Past Raven Rock, the trail passes through thickets of mountain laurel and rhododendron, followed by a more open area with a rock garden where large ferns grow among massive boulders.

Further along, additional rhododendron thickets lead to the junction with the Daniel Boone Scout Trail, one of several trails in Grandfather Mountain State Park. Nearby is the junction with the Nuwati Trail, another state park trail. Hiking and camping on Grandfather Mountain require a permit.

The Tanawha Trail then passes several small cascades and crosses Boone Fork Creek, where junctions with the Asutsi Trail and the Upper Boone Fork Trail are located. A self-registration permit box for Grandfather Mountain is also situated near the Asutsi Trail junction. The trail continues through rhododendron and laurel thickets, joins an old logging road, and winds through a hardwood forest.

In its final section leading into Price Park, the trail emerges into open fields. Here, it parallels and crosses Holloway Mountain Road, passing apple orchards, a historic gravesite, and pastureland that in spring is blanketed with wildflowers. The pasture is active, with cattle that are not fenced off from hikers. While the cattle are typically docile and avoidant of people, there have been incidents involving injuries, and signs near this section of the trail provide guidance for encounters with livestock. The cattle are often seen grazing or resting in the shade of mountain laurel. The trail then briefly overlaps with the Boone Fork Trail and diverges from the MST before concluding with a short approach into Price Park's campground.

== See also ==
- Blue Ridge Parkway
- Grandfather Mountain State Park
- Julian Price Memorial Park
- Linn Cove Viaduct
- Mountains-to-Sea Trail
