= Natchez Trace Parkway Bridge =

Bridge in Williamson County, Tennessee

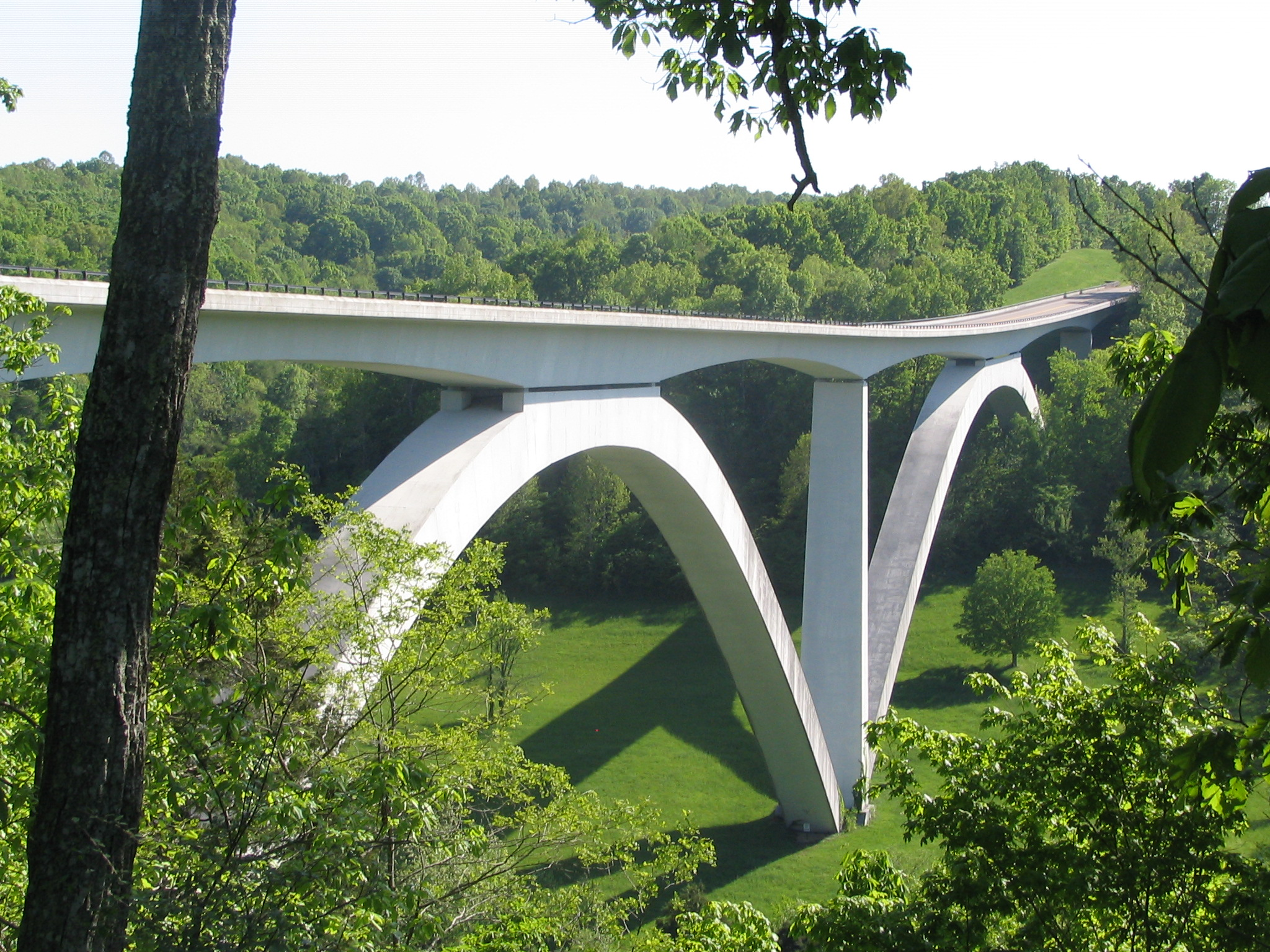
- The Natchez Trace Parkway Bridge as viewed from its north end in 2006
- Coordinates: 35.9866°N 86.9923°W
- Carries: Natchez Trace Parkway
- Crosses: SR 96
- Locale: Williamson County, Tennessee
- Maintained by: National Park Service
- ID number: 5570463P0000000

Characteristics
- Design: Arch
- Total length: 1,572 ft (479 m)
- Width: 37 ft (11 m)
- Height: 145 ft (44 m)
- Longest span: 582 ft (177 m)
- Clearance below: 107 ft (33 m)

History
- Designer: FIGG Bridge Engineers
- Opened: March 22, 1994

Statistics
- Daily traffic: 210 (in 1997)
- Toll: none

Location
- Interactive map of Natchez Trace Parkway Bridge

The Natchez Trace Parkway Bridge (officially referred to as the Double Arch Bridge at Birdsong Hollow) is a concrete double arch bridge located in Williamson County, Tennessee, 8.7 mi (14.0 km) from the northern terminus of the Natchez Trace Parkway. It is 1,572 ft (479 m) long and carries the two-lane Natchez Trace Parkway 145 ft (44 m) over State Route 96 and a heavily wooded valley.

== Background ==
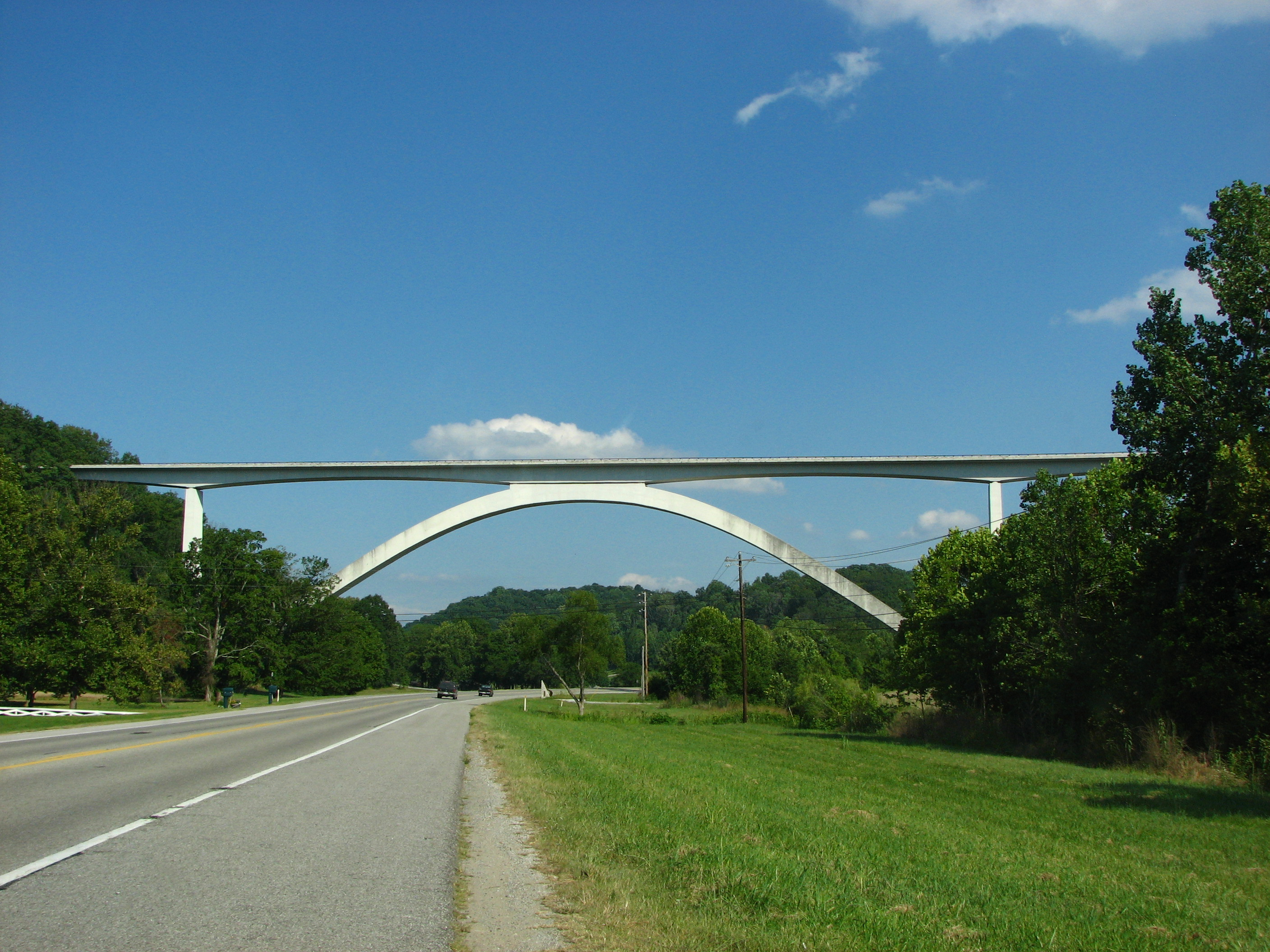
The bridge as viewed in 2008 from State Route 96, looking southeast

The bridge, also known as the Natchez Trace Parkway Arches, is the first segmentally constructed concrete arch bridge in the United States. The arches comprise 122 hollow box segments precast in nearby Franklin, each of which was about 9.8 ft (3.0 m) long and weighed between 29 and 45 short tons. The deck consists of 196 precast post-tensioned trapezoidal box girder segments, each typically 8.5 ft (2.6 m) long. The sections atop the crown of the arch are 13 ft (4.0 m) deep. The foundations and piers of the bridge were cast in place.

The 582 ft (177 m) long main span is symmetrical, while the 462 ft (141 m) long second arch is not, due to the slope of the valley at the southern end of the bridge. The bridge is rare in that it does not use spandrel columns to support the deck from the arch. Rather than being evenly distributed along the arch's length, the weight of the bridge is concentrated at the crown of the arch. The lack of spandrel columns results in a clean, unencumbered appearance: it is termed a cathedral arch bridge.

The bridge was designed by Figg Engineering Group and built by PCL Civil Constructors Inc., a subsidiary of PCL Constructors Inc. The arches and deck were constructed using a balanced cantilever method. Each arch was supported by temporary cable stays anchored from the top of the piers and the valley sides until it was fully built. This procedure was chosen in place of conventional shoring towers so that environmental damage to the valley would be minimized. The bridge cost US$11.3 million to build, and was completed in October 1993. It was officially opened on March 22, 1994.

The bridge has won many awards for its design, including a Presidential Award for Design Excellence in 1995, and an Award of Merit from the Federal Highway Administration in 1996. The Eleventh International Bridge Conference named it the single most outstanding achievement in the bridge industry for 1994. The bridge "impressed the... jury with its aesthetically striking double-arch design, which shows exceptional sensitivity to the historical context of the site."

The bridge is featured on the cover of Christian rock band Newsboys' 2004 album Devotion.

== Suicide barrier installation ==
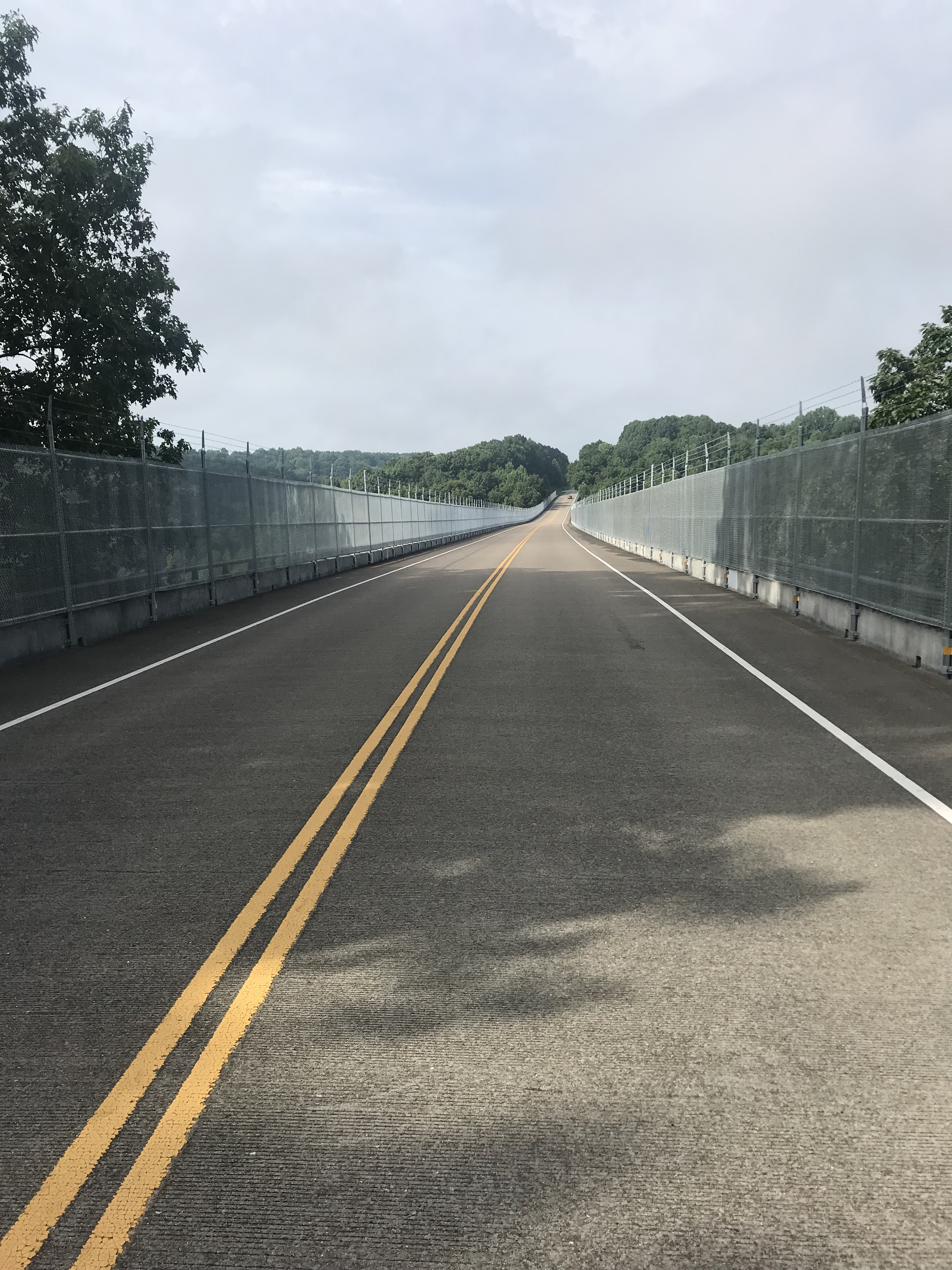
The suicide barrier installed on the bridge in 2022.

Between 2000 and 2022, 42 people died by suicide at the bridge. Suicide prevention signs were posted in 2011, but the deaths continued. The Natchez Trace Bridge Barrier Coalition was formed in September 2018 to work with federal congressional delegates and the National Park Service to install a suicide prevention barrier. On August 16, 2022, a barrier of chain link and barbed wire was installed along both sides of the bridge to raise the existing 32-inch (0.81 m) railing and increase deterrence. On April 15, 2026, the bridge was closed to all traffic for installation of a permanent pedestrian safety barrier. It is expected to reopen in early 2027.
