= St. Helena, North Carolina =

- Village
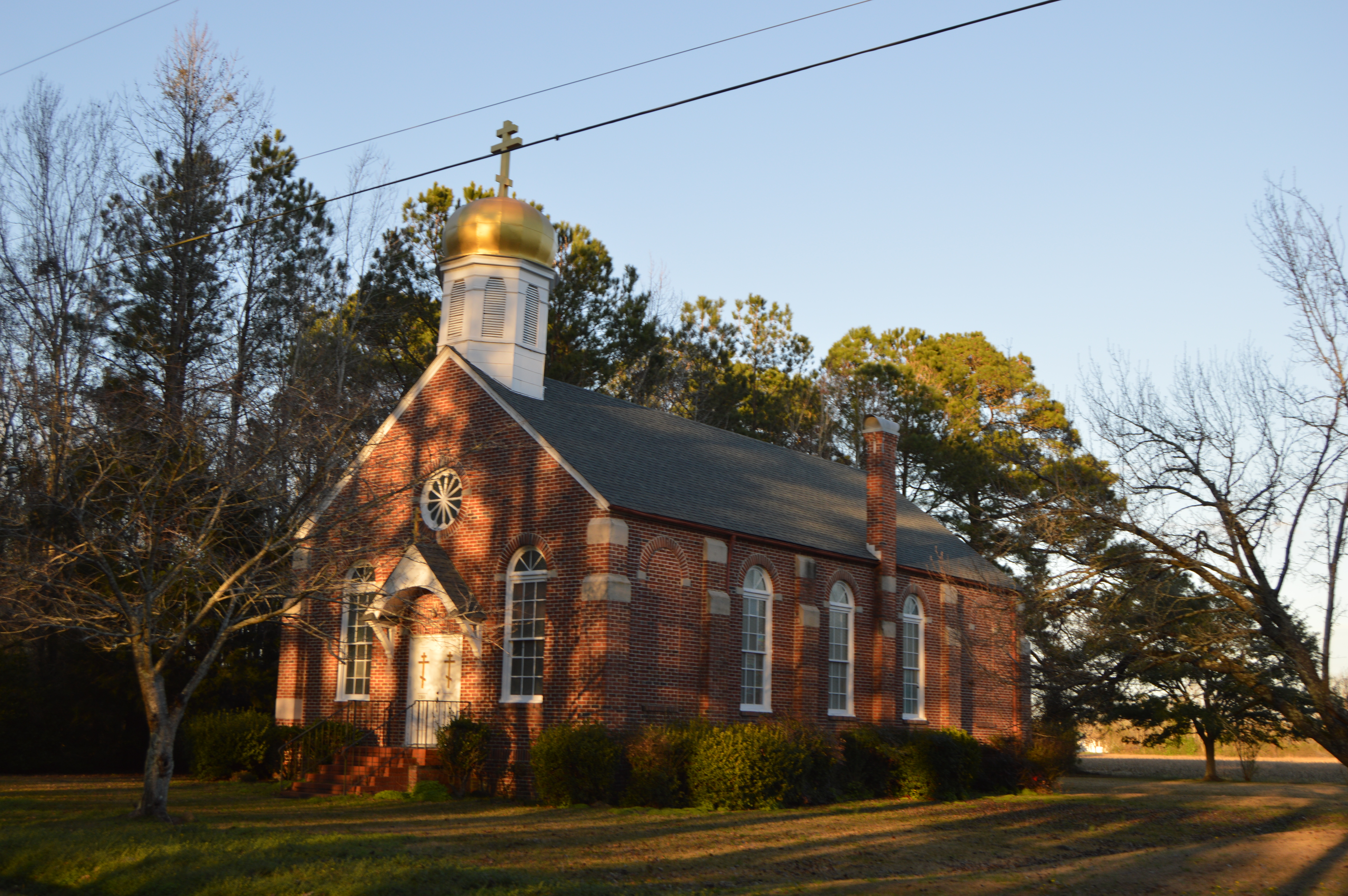
- SS. Peter and Paul's Church on Front Street

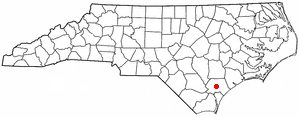
- Location of St. Helena, North Carolina
- Coordinates: 34°31′00″N 77°55′03″W
- Country: United States
- State: North Carolina
- County: Pender

Area
  - Total: 5.64 sq mi (14.60 km^{2})
  - Land: 5.64 sq mi (14.60 km^{2})
  - Water: 0 sq mi (0.00 km^{2})
- Elevation: 56 ft (17 m)

Population (2020)
  - Total: 417
  - Density: 74.0/sq mi (28.56/km^{2})
- Time zone: UTC-5 (Eastern (EST))
  - Summer (DST): UTC-4 (EDT)
- ZIP code: 28425
- Area codes: 910, 472
- FIPS code: 37-58620
- GNIS feature ID: 2407553
- Website: www.villageofsthelena.com

St. Helena or Saint Helena is a village in Pender County, North Carolina, United States. The population was 417 at the 2020 census. It is part of the Wilmington, NC Metropolitan Statistical Area.

== History ==
The town was founded in 1905 by Hugh MacRae as a grape growing community and he sought out Italian immigrants to come to Pender to grow grapes and make wine, St. Helena was advertised in Europe and the message would come to America and get a 10 acre farm and it is named after for Queen Elena

== Geography ==
According to the United States Census Bureau, the village has a total area of 5.7 square miles (15 km^{2}), all land.

== Demographics ==
Historical population
Census	Pop.	Note	%±
1990	321		—
2000	395		23.1%
2010	389		−1.5%
2020	417		7.2%
U.S. Decennial Census

As of the census of 2000, there were 395 people, 162 households, and 116 families residing in the village. The population density was 69.9 inhabitants per square mile (27.0/km^{2}). There were 175 housing units at an average density of 31.0 per square mile (12.0/km^{2}). The racial makeup of the village was 69.37% White, 29.87% African American, 0.25% from other races, and 0.51% from two or more races. Hispanic or Latino of any race were 0.76% of the population.

There were 162 households, out of which 32.1% had children under the age of 18 living with them, 61.7% were married couples living together, 8.6% had a female householder with no husband present, and 27.8% were non-families. 24.1% of all households were made up of individuals, and 12.3% had someone living alone who was 65 years of age or older. The average household size was 2.44 and the average family size was 2.88.

In the village, the population was spread out, with 23.8% under the age of 18, 6.1% from 18 to 24, 26.6% from 25 to 44, 29.1% from 45 to 64, and 14.4% who were 65 years of age or older. The median age was 42 years. For every 100 females, there were 85.4 males. For every 100 females age 18 and over, there were 83.5 males.

The median income for a household in the village was $36,042, and the median income for a family was $48,750. Males had a median income of $30,417 versus $19,545 for females. The per capita income for the village was $18,040. About 5.7% of families and 7.7% of the population were below the poverty line, including 5.1% of those under age 18 and 24.1% of those age 65 or over.
