= Eugene Figg =

American structural engineer (1936–2002)

Eugene C. Figg
- Born: Eugene Cecil Figg, Jr. August 4, 1936; Charleston, South Carolina, U.S.
- Died: March 20, 2002 (aged 65)
- Occupation: Structural engineer
- Years active: 1958–2002
- Known for: Cable-stayed bridge design, segmental concrete construction

Eugene C. Figg (August 4, 1936 – March 20, 2002) was an American structural engineer who made numerous contributions to the field of structural engineering, especially in the design of the cable-stayed bridge and the use of the segmental concrete construction method.

== Life ==
Figg was born August 4, 1936, in Charleston, South Carolina. He received a civil engineering degree as a structural engineer from The Citadel in Charleston in 1958.

During his career, he brought the use of the segmental method for spanning large gaps to the United States with the assistance of his Paris-based partner, Jean M. Muller. His affiliation with Muller, begun at Figg and Muller Engineers (founded in 1978), allowed him to gain valuable insight into the application of pre-cast segmental bridge construction methods to the domestic market. When they coupled this construction method with cable-stayed supports, Mueller and Figg effectively increased the use of concrete in longer span bridge proposals.

He formed his own engineering firm, the Figg Engineering Group, still operating and based in Tallahassee. Figg also founded the American Segmental Bridge Institute in 1989, and served four years as a trustee at the National Building Museum. Over its history, FIGG has designed or contributed to over 230 bridges across the United States and internationally. The firm has received numerous awards for its engineering and design work, including recognition from the American Society of Civil Engineers (ASCE) and the National Steel Bridge Alliance. Notable projects of the firm have included the Sunshine Skyway Bridge over Tampa Bay, Florida (1987); the Natchez Trace Parkway Arches in Franklin, Tennessee (1994); the Blue Ridge Parkway Viaduct and Linn Cove Viaduct in North Carolina; the I-35W Saint Anthony Falls Bridge, a replacement bridge constructed after the original structure's collapse in Minneapolis, Minnesota (2008); and a Florida International University pedestrian bridge in Sweetwater, Florida that collapsed while under construction.

== Awards ==
In 2000, Figg was honored with the John A. Roebling Medal for his outstanding lifetime achievement in bridge engineering.

== Famous bridges ==
- Sunshine Skyway Bridge
- Linn Cove Viaduct
- Natchez Trace Parkway Bridge

== See also ==
- List of civil engineers

== Bibliography ==
- "2002 OPAL Recipients – Eugene C. Figg, Jr". American Society of Civil Engineers. Archived from the original on September 30, 2007.
- "ALUM Spotlight Linda Figg '81". Auburn University Alumni Association. Archived from the original on April 28, 2007.
- Brassfield, Mike (March 22, 2002). "'Visionary' engineer's legacy spans bay area". St. Petersburg Times.
- "New Bridge Award Created in Honour of Eugene Figg". Bridge Design & Engineering. 2002. Archived from the original on November 10, 2006.
- Burgess, M. (2005). "Precast, Prestressed Bridges". Precast Prestressed Concrete Institute. Archived from the original on December 20, 1996.
- Ensley, Gerald (2002). "Bridge designer Eugene Figg dies at 65". Tallahassee Democrat.
- Marsh, Don (May 2002). "Gene Figg: A master of market development". Concrete Products. 105 (5): 8.
- Pittman, C. (June 11, 2001). "Bridge inspectors unscathed". St. Petersburg Times.
- Vogel, Mike (2006). "Making a Connection". Florida Trend.
- Wilson, Bill (2000). "A brush with greatness". Roads & Bridges. 38 (8): 28.
- Zeyher, Allen (2002). "Spanning the News". Roads & Bridges. 40 (4): 8.
