= Grandmother Gap =

- Location within North Carolina
- Elevation: 4,075 feet (1,242 m)
- Traversed by: Blue Ridge Parkway

Third Approach
- Location: North Carolina; United States
- Range: Blue Ridge Mountains
- Coordinates: 36°04′35″N 81°50′05″W
- Topo map: USGS Grandfather Mountain

Grandmother Gap (el. 4,075 ft (1,242 m)) is a mountain pass in North Carolina on the Blue Ridge Parkway, between Grandmother Mountain and Beacon Heights, east of Linville and nearby Grandfather Mountain.
