= Jean M. Muller =

Jean Muller (May 25, 1925 – March 17, 2005) was a French bridge engineer who focused on design and construction of concrete bridges.

== Early career ==
Born in Levallois-Perret, France, Muller attended the École Centrale des Arts et Manufactures in Paris, France before he started his career as a bridge engineer. After school he began working closely with Eugene Freyssinet, and was able to learn the technique of concrete bridge building and develop more efficient ways to join bridge segments together. While working under Freyssinet, Muller was able to learn many techniques which would guide him in his career as a successful Bridge Engineer.

== Experience ==
In 1951 he became the chief engineer of the Freyssinet Company and moved to the United States where he began constructing single and multiple span bridges. During this period Muller invented the technique of match-casting. His match-casting innovation was first used with dry joints on the single span Shelton Bridge in upstate New York. The technique was further developed using epoxy on the joints along with pre-cast concrete segmental box-girder technology, which was applied in 1962 on the Choisy-le-Roi Bridge extending over the Seine River in Paris, France In 1955 he began working for Campenon Bernard in Paris, France, where he worked with large pre-stressed concrete projects. When he returned to Florida, he joined Eugene Figg and formed Figg and Muller Engineers in 1978. He also designed in 1997, one of the greatest engineering project in Canada, known as the Confederation Bridge connecting over the Gulf of St-Lawrence on a distance of 12.9 km the Province of New Brunswick and Prince Edward Island. Muller ended his career in 2000 after working as technical director for 11 years at J. Muller International.

== Invention ==
After retiring from J. Muller International his colleagues remembered him as an engineer that could take a very complicated problem and reduce it to a few pages of calculations. A prime example of this was his match-casting and segmental bridge section techniques. His match-casting invention consisted of pre-cast segmental sections being cast together and then separated. This made it possible for the sections to fit perfectly together when constructed at the job site, and reduced construction time significantly.

Before match-casting, pre-cast concrete bridge segments were connected using cast-in-place mortar joints. Cast-in-place joints meant that the sections were mortared together at the bridge construction site while cranes or structural supports held up the pre-cast segments. However, if match-cast sections were used, mortared joints were not necessary. Instead, an epoxy was applied to both surfaces of the sections to be joined. The sections fit perfectly together and no fillers were required to patch voids on the joint surfaces. Since there were no voids on the joint surfaces the entire cross-sectional area of the joint was in contact providing enough area to produce an extremely strong connection.

== Recognition and awards ==
- The Franklin Institute awarded Muller the Frank P. Brown Medal in 1995 for "developing a method of match-casting of pre-cast concrete elements."
- During its 125th anniversary in 1999, Engineering News Record recognized Muller as one of the top 125 people to contribute to engineering and construction.

== Religion ==
Jean Muller was a fundamentalist Christian believer and a lifelong adherent of the Plymouth Brethren. He regularly visited Brethren assemblies around the world, not only in the course of his work, but also for specific occasions. He taught at the annual Plumstead Bible Conferences. A range of his sermons in French and English are given on Bibliquest and BibleCentre, etc.

He normally attended the long established (pre 1870s) Assemblée des Frères at 32 Villa Wagram, 233 rue du Faubourg Saint-Honoré, 75008 Paris.
