= Grandfather Mountain =

Mountain in North Carolina

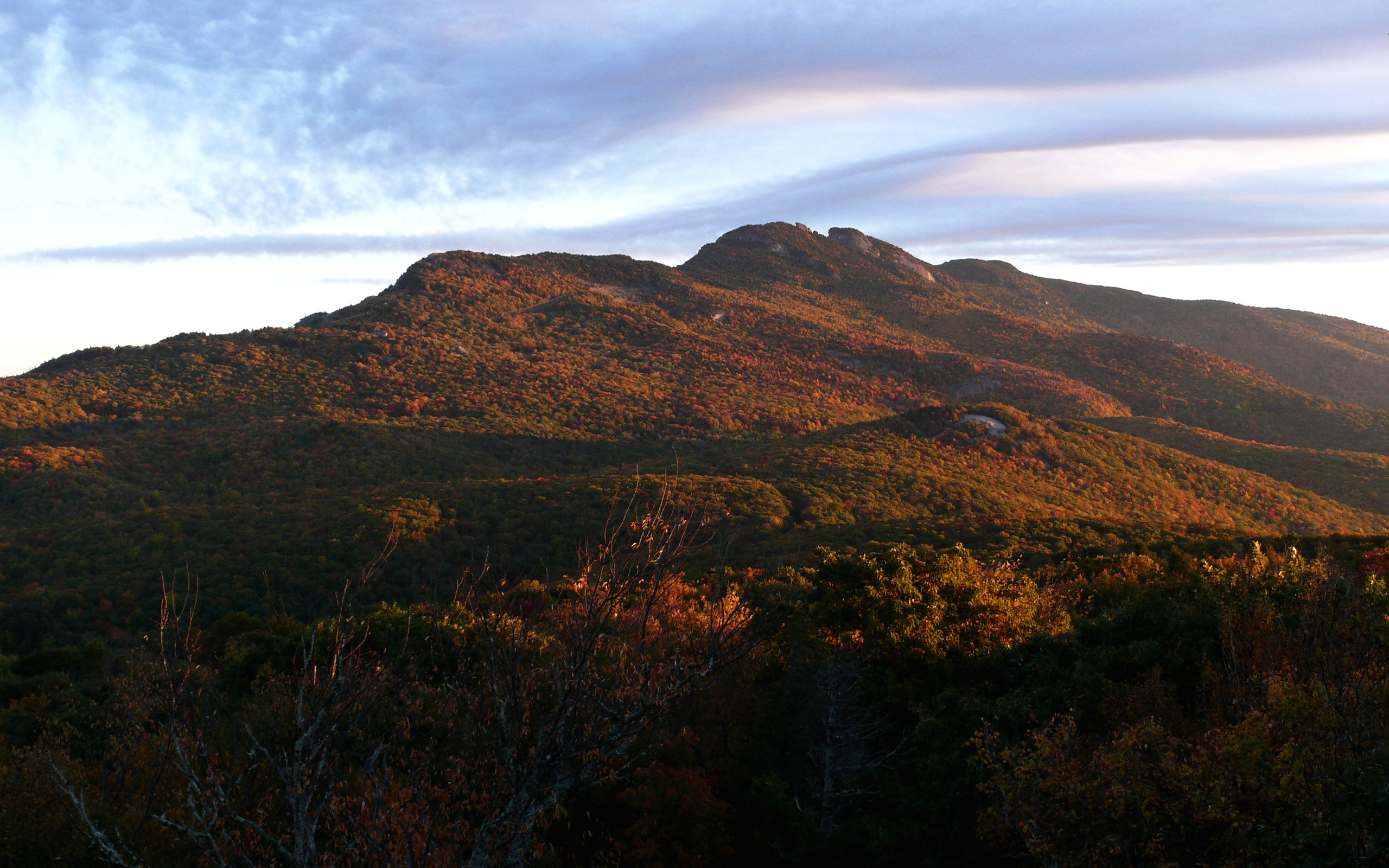

Highest point
- Elevation: 5,946 ft (1,812 m)
- Prominence: 2,444 ft (745 m)
- Coordinates: 36°06′40″N 81°48′41″W

Geography
- Location: Avery / Caldwell / Watauga counties, North Carolina, U.S.
- Parent range: Blue Ridge Mountains
- Topo map: USGS Grandfather Mountain

Climbing
- Easiest route: Hike

Grandfather Mountain is a mountain, a non-profit attraction, and a North Carolina state park near Linville, North Carolina. At 5,946 feet (1,812 m), it is the highest peak on the eastern escarpment of the Blue Ridge Mountains, one of the major chains of the Appalachian Mountains, as well as the highest point on the Eastern Continental Divide. (There are many taller peaks nearby, including Mt. Mitchell, the highest peak east of the Mississippi River, but they are fully west of the divide.) The Blue Ridge Parkway passes by the south side of the mountain and also passes over the nearby Grandmother Gap. It is located at the meeting point of Avery, Caldwell (highest point), and Watauga (highest point) counties. Most of the mountain is contained within Grandfather Mountain State Park, while a small privately owned section in the southeast is operated as a ticketed tourist attraction, containing the well-known Mile-High Swinging Bridge.

== Physical features ==
Grandfather Mountain rises 5,964 feet (1,818 m) above sea level, and due to the considerable elevation gain the mountain boasts 16 distinct ecological communities. The mountain is famous for its rugged character, and is home to many hidden caves and significant cliffs.

It has been reported that Grandfather Mountain has experienced some of the "highest surface wind speeds ever recorded," with unverified speeds in excess of 200 mph (320 km/h). More recently, Grandfather Mountain has upgraded their wind equipment in order to help resolve controversy over these high wind recordings. Notably however, the new equipment is located on the Swinging Bridge of the attraction. The new instruments may not record the highest wind speeds on the mountain, which extends another 684 feet (208 m) above the current location of the equipment.

The primary massif (ridge) of the mountain is oriented roughly north to south, and features four named peaks: Calloway Peak (5,964 ft.), Attic Window Peak (5,949 ft.), MacRae Peak (5,844 ft.), and Linville Peak (5,295 ft.). Although not as high as the adjacent Calloway and Attic Window Peaks, MacRae is much more difficult to reach due to difficult and exposed approaches from both the north and south.

Two rivers have headwaters on Grandfather Mountain, the Linville River, flowing east, and the Watauga River, flowing west. Many lesser streams originate on the slopes of Grandfather, including: Upper Boone Fork, Little Wilson Creek, Wilson Creek (North Carolina), Stack Rock Creek, and others.

On top of Grandfather Mountain, like many mountain peaks above 5000' in North Carolina, grows an "island" of Southern Appalachian spruce-fir forest. Though the forest was largely devastated during the 20th century by the introduction of the non-native balsam wooly adelgid, a remnant of this biome still exists on Grandfather Mountain. Many of these fir trees have been permanently bent by the high winds that often prevail from the west. In addition to fir trees, these "mountaintop island" biomes are a valuable and threatened habitat for many other flora and fauna suited to survival at higher elevation.

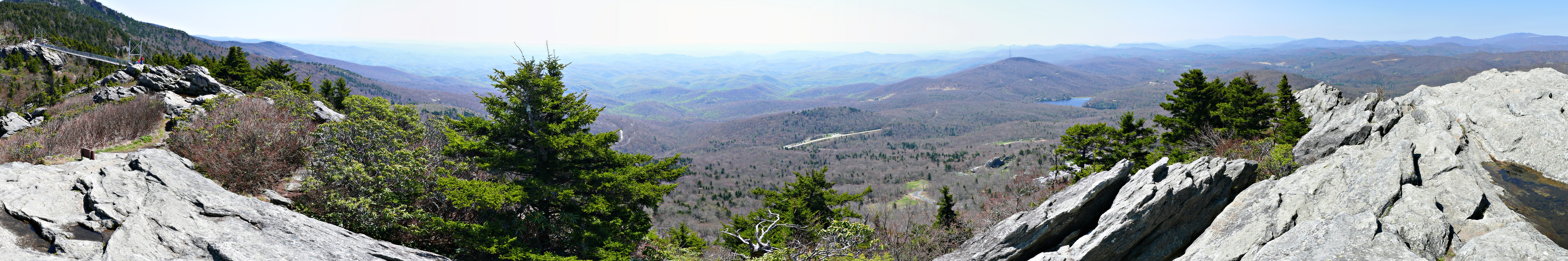
Looking south from Linville Peak on Grandfather Mountain

Facing North from the Mile-High Swinging Bridge on Grandfather Mountain

== History ==
=== Private ownership ===
Until 2008, Grandfather Mountain was privately owned and operated as a nature preserve and tourist attraction. It was and still is best known for its mile-high swinging bridge, the highest in America, built in 1952 by Hugh Morton. The bridge links two of the mountain's rocky peaks, and is known as the "swinging" bridge due to its tendency to sway in high winds. Morton inherited the mountain from his grandfather and developed the tourist attractions. He died on June 1, 2006, at the age of 85. After Morton's death, he donated all of his photographs, including many of Grandfather Mountain, Mildred the Bear, and many other aspects of life on the mountain to the University of North Carolina at Chapel Hill.

=== Grandfather Mountain State Park ===
On September 29, 2008, North Carolina Governor Mike Easley announced that the state had agreed to purchase 2,600 acres (11 km^{2}) of the undeveloped portions of Grandfather Mountain from the Morton family for $12 million. The area has been added to the North Carolina State Park system, becoming the 34th North Carolina state park. The Morton family established the Grandfather Mountain Stewardship Foundation to continue to operate the travel destination as an educational nature park. Grandfather Mountain State Park was officially established in 2009. The "backcountry" portion of the mountain that comprises the state park is now regularly (in favorable weather) patrolled by state park rangers and other state law enforcement personnel.

As part of the purchase agreement, the state acquired part of the mountain commonly referred to as the "backcountry" in fee simple, and it also acquired a conservation easement and right of first refusal over the remaining "attraction side" of the mountain. In addition, the Morton family agreed to form a new non-profit organization and transfer ownership of the attraction to it. This arrangement was made as an alternative to the state acquiring the entire mountain, because some of the traditional activities at Grandfather Mountain conflict with state park management policies.

On September 18, 2011, the park had a grand opening celebration for its first office area, which is 3 miles (4.8 km) from the Profile Trail-head on NC 105.

== Access ==
The attraction side of the mountain, which includes the Mile High Swinging Bridge, is accessed via Grandfather Mountain Entrance Road. Admittance fees are charged at the main gate. Part or all of the attraction is sometimes closed due to frequently inclement weather in the late fall, winter, and early spring.

Hiking and camping are free in the "backcountry" area now designated as a state park; the required permits are available at all trail heads. Those intending to enter or leave the park via the attraction must still pay admittance, however. In years previous when the whole mountain was privately owned, hikers and campers were required to pay fees. Park regulations are enforced by patrolling state park rangers. Fire is prohibited at many of the higher elevation campsites, due to high winds.

The 11 trails on the mountain vary in difficulty, from strolls through the woods to some of the most rugged and intense hiking found in the Eastern U.S.

The east side trails can be accessed at Boone Fork parking area, at milepost 300 of the Blue Ridge Parkway. When the parkway is closed in winter, this trailhead can still be accessed via the Asutsi trail, beginning at Serenity Farm on highway 221. The easiest east side route to Calloway Peak is to follow Tanawha Trail to the Daniel Boone Scout trail. This includes two large fixed ladders that traverse rock faces. Alternatively, a steeper but more scenic option is the Cragway trail, which is narrower and boulder strewn, but offers excellent views of the Boone Fork bowl, or "medicine valley."

The west side trails are accessed via NC 105, 0.7 miles (1.1 km) north of the intersection with NC 184. There is a wooden sign with yellow lettering that reads "Profile Parking." This references the Profile trail, which climbs steadily for 3.1 miles (5.0 km) before intersecting the Grandfather trail at a point 0.4 miles (0.64 km) south of Calloway Peak, and 0.8 miles (1.3 km) north of Attic Window Peak. It is named for the famous "Profile View" it passes, which is a rock feature resembling a human facial profile.

The Grandfather trail traverses the 2.4 miles (3.9 km) of ridgeline between Calloway Peak and the Swinging Bridge (Linville Peak), attaining Attic Window and MacRae Peaks along the way. This trail is among the most difficult and technical in the region. In addition to significant steep elevation gain and loss, trail conditions include frequent exposure to very high winds, contiguity to several large cliffs, crossings of cracked boulders, and multiple traverses aided by fixed ladders and cables. This 2.4 miles (3.9 km) is normally covered at below half of normal hiking pace. In favorable weather conditions this trail is considered advanced. In poor weather, (throughout the winter and much of spring), this trail should only be attempted by experienced, expert hikers, due to significant formation of ice sheets, accumulation of snow, frequent low visibility, and commonly sub-zero wind chill factors. Significantly, in the early months of 2011, the state park service closed trail access to MacRae peak, something very seldom if ever done under private ownership. The closure notice threatened violators with prosecution under a section of the NC General Statutes.

== Attractions ==
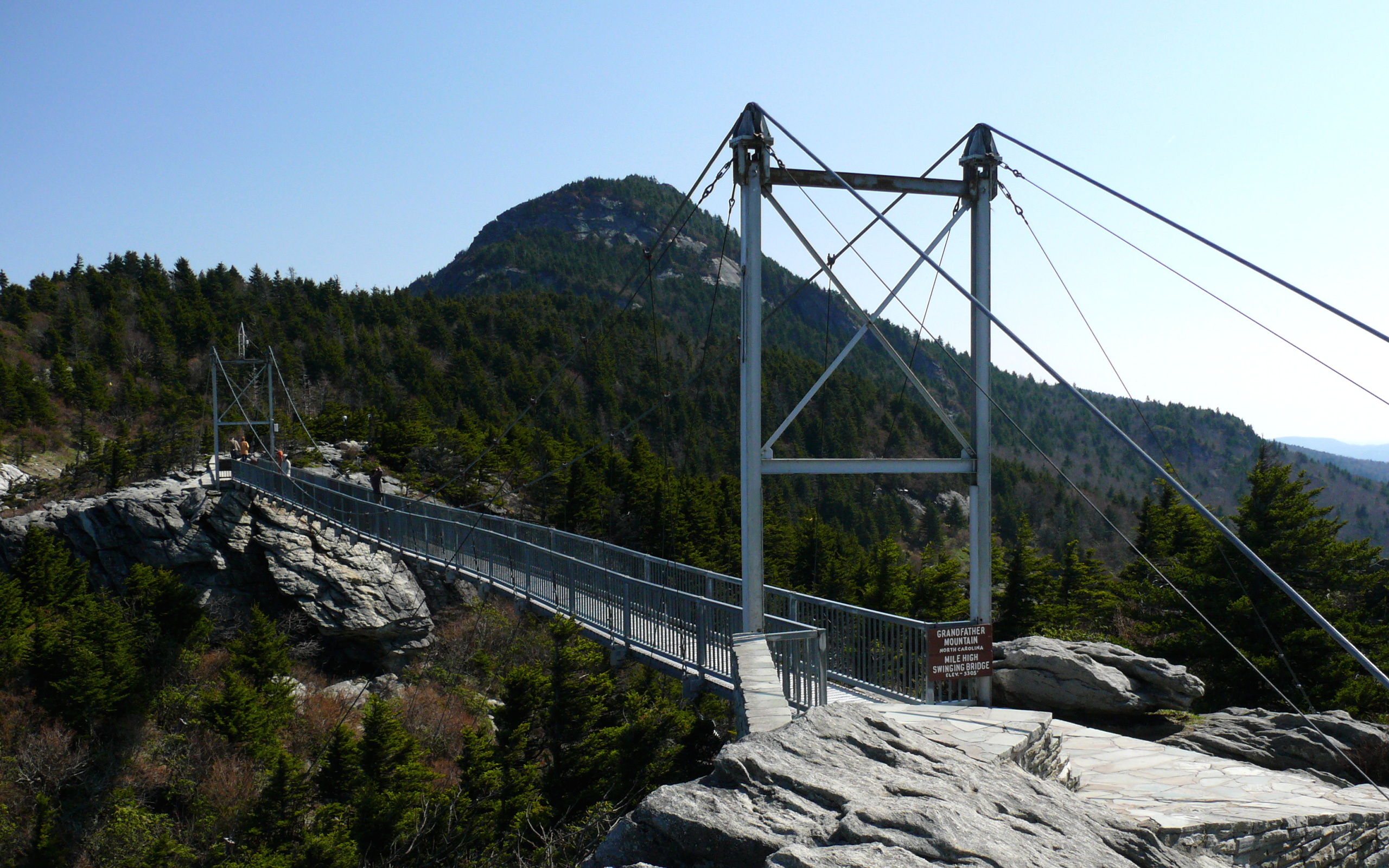
Mile-High Swinging Bridge

One of North America's largest Highland games events, the Grandfather Mountain Highland Games are held here each year, drawing in visitors from all over the world. The Highland Games celebrate the Scottish ancestry of many of the pioneers who settled around the mountain and feature traditional Scottish games and music. The Grandfather Mountain games have been called "the best" such event in the United States because of the spectacular highland setting (reminiscent of Scotland) and the great percentage of people who attend in kilts and other Scottish regalia. It is considered the largest "gathering of clans" because more different family lines are represented at this event than any other in North America.

A paved road leads to one of the mountain's several peaks (Linville Peak), and there visitors will find a museum, the famous "mile-high swinging bridge", and views of up to 100 miles (160 km) - on a clear day, it is possible to see the city skyline of Charlotte. The view also overlooks the Grandfather Mountain Golf and Country Club, which lies at the base of Grandfather Mountain. It has two 18-hole golf courses, one championship and one executive, each designed by Ellis Maples. The championship course is consistently ranked as the finest mountain course in the Carolinas.

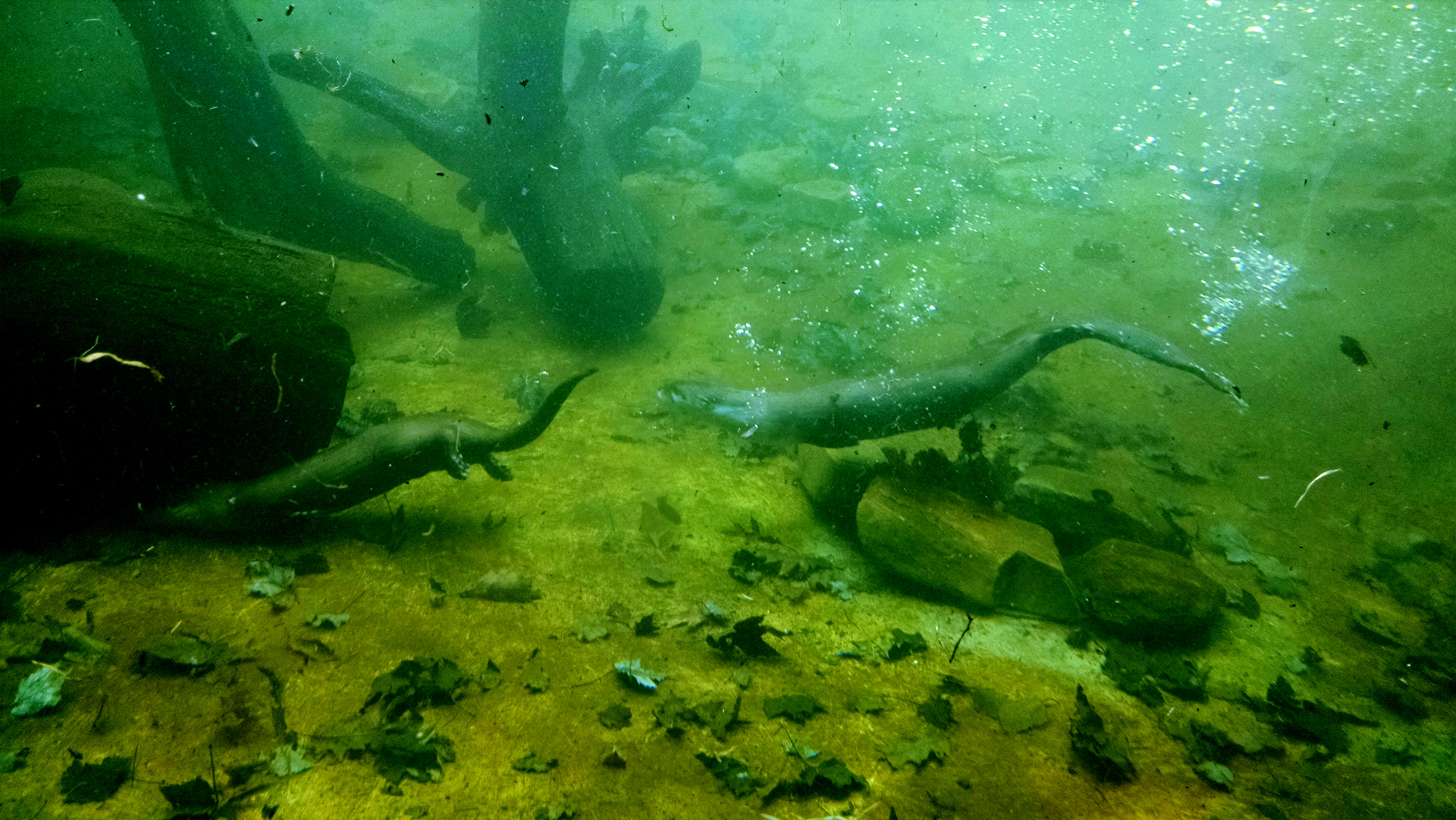
Two river otters seen swimming underwater in the wildlife exhibit at Grandfather Mountain State Park, North Carolina

On the road to the summit there are wildlife exhibits and picnic areas. Grandfather has six environmental habitats for black bear, river otters, cougars, bald eagles, and elk.

Mildred the Bear came to Grandfather Mountain in 1968 at age 2 from the Atlanta Zoo. She was named by Ralph Smith, a cast member of The Arthur Smith Show, which filmed Mildred for one of their songs. A 2-acre (0.81 ha) habitat for Mildred was added in 1973. Mildred died in 1993 at age 26.

Grandfather Mountain and its surrounding communities were served by the narrow gauge East Tennessee and Western North Carolina Railroad (The ET&WNC, nicknamed "Tweetsie") until the flood of 1940. The railroad helped make the mountain a favorite vacation spot for excursionists during the early 20th century.

The scene in the 1994 film Forrest Gump where the title character runs on a curvy mountain road was filmed here.

== Climate ==
Grandfather Mountain has a humid continental climate (Dfb), cooler than most of the rest of North Carolina. Winters are cold and snowy, while summers are mild. The mountain receives abundant precipitation throughout the year, with a slight peak in June and September. The average snow depth peaks in February at 3 inches.

The earliest and latest snowfalls of the season have occurred on the dates September 10, 1964, and May 27, 1967, respectively.

Climate data for Grandfather Mountain, North Carolina, 1991–2020 normals, extremes 1955–present
Month	Jan	Feb	Mar	Apr	May	Jun	Jul	Aug	Sep	Oct	Nov	Dec	Year
Record high °F (°C)	63 (17)	67 (19)	76 (24)	80 (27)	78 (26)	83 (28)	85 (29)	83 (28)	80 (27)	79 (26)	69 (21)	63 (17)	85 (29)
Mean maximum °F (°C)	53.2 (11.8)	55.5 (13.1)	63.4 (17.4)	70.5 (21.4)	74.0 (23.3)	76.7 (24.8)	78.2 (25.7)	77.1 (25.1)	74.2 (23.4)	69.7 (20.9)	61.7 (16.5)	55.1 (12.8)	79.4 (26.3)
Mean daily maximum °F (°C)	37.3 (2.9)	39.8 (4.3)	45.6 (7.6)	55.3 (12.9)	62.2 (16.8)	68.5 (20.3)	71.9 (22.2)	70.5 (21.4)	65.5 (18.6)	56.9 (13.8)	48.1 (8.9)	41.7 (5.4)	55.3 (12.9)
Daily mean °F (°C)	29.1 (−1.6)	31.3 (−0.4)	37.5 (3.1)	46.6 (8.1)	54.5 (12.5)	61.4 (16.3)	64.8 (18.2)	63.6 (17.6)	58.5 (14.7)	49.2 (9.6)	40.0 (4.4)	33.7 (0.9)	47.5 (8.6)
Mean daily minimum °F (°C)	21.0 (−6.1)	22.8 (−5.1)	29.4 (−1.4)	37.8 (3.2)	46.8 (8.2)	54.2 (12.3)	57.6 (14.2)	56.7 (13.7)	51.5 (10.8)	41.5 (5.3)	31.9 (−0.1)	25.7 (−3.5)	39.7 (4.3)
Mean minimum °F (°C)	−3.6 (−19.8)	1.2 (−17.1)	7.3 (−13.7)	18.2 (−7.7)	29.9 (−1.2)	43.8 (6.6)	49.8 (9.9)	49.4 (9.7)	38.4 (3.6)	23.3 (−4.8)	12.5 (−10.8)	4.4 (−15.3)	−8.3 (−22.4)
Record low °F (°C)	−32 (−36)	−19 (−28)	−9 (−23)	5 (−15)	17 (−8)	31 (−1)	41 (5)	36 (2)	24 (−4)	12 (−11)	−8 (−22)	−21 (−29)	−32 (−36)
Average precipitation inches (mm)	5.01 (127)	3.93 (100)	5.38 (137)	5.90 (150)	6.05 (154)	6.36 (162)	6.21 (158)	5.76 (146)	6.45 (164)	4.98 (126)	4.19 (106)	4.53 (115)	64.75 (1,645)
Average snowfall inches (cm)	13.7 (35)	13.0 (33)	7.9 (20)	6.0 (15)	0.5 (1.3)	0.0 (0.0)	0.0 (0.0)	0.0 (0.0)	0.0 (0.0)	0.4 (1.0)	2.4 (6.1)	9.6 (24)	53.5 (135.4)
Average precipitation days (≥ 0.01 in)	14.6	13.5	14.2	13.4	15.2	15.8	16.3	15.8	12.4	11.8	10.8	13.4	167.2
Average snowy days (≥ 0.1 in)	6.3	6.0	3.9	2.3	0.2	0.0	0.0	0.0	0.0	0.4	1.7	4.7	25.5
Source: NOAA (snow/snow days 1981–2010)

== Grandfather Mountain Stewardship Foundation ==
The Grandfather Mountain Stewardship Foundation is the 501(c)(3) nonprofit organization established by the Morton family in 2009 to operate the scenic travel attraction Grandfather Mountain in Linville, N.C.

The Foundation manages the roughly 720-acre (290 ha) property that includes the Mile High Swinging Bridge, Nature Museum and Animal Habitats. All proceeds from sales of tickets and souvenirs go toward preserving Grandfather Mountain and sharing its wonders in ways that deepen visitors' appreciation of nature and inspire good stewardship of the Earth.

The mission statement of the Grandfather Mountain Stewardship Foundation, adopted in 2014, is: "Inspiring conservation of the natural world by helping guests explore, understand and value the wonders of Grandfather Mountain."

The Stewardship Foundation is managed by a seven-member Board of Directors, which in turn employs the leadership and staff of the Grandfather Mountain attraction.

== Photo gallery ==
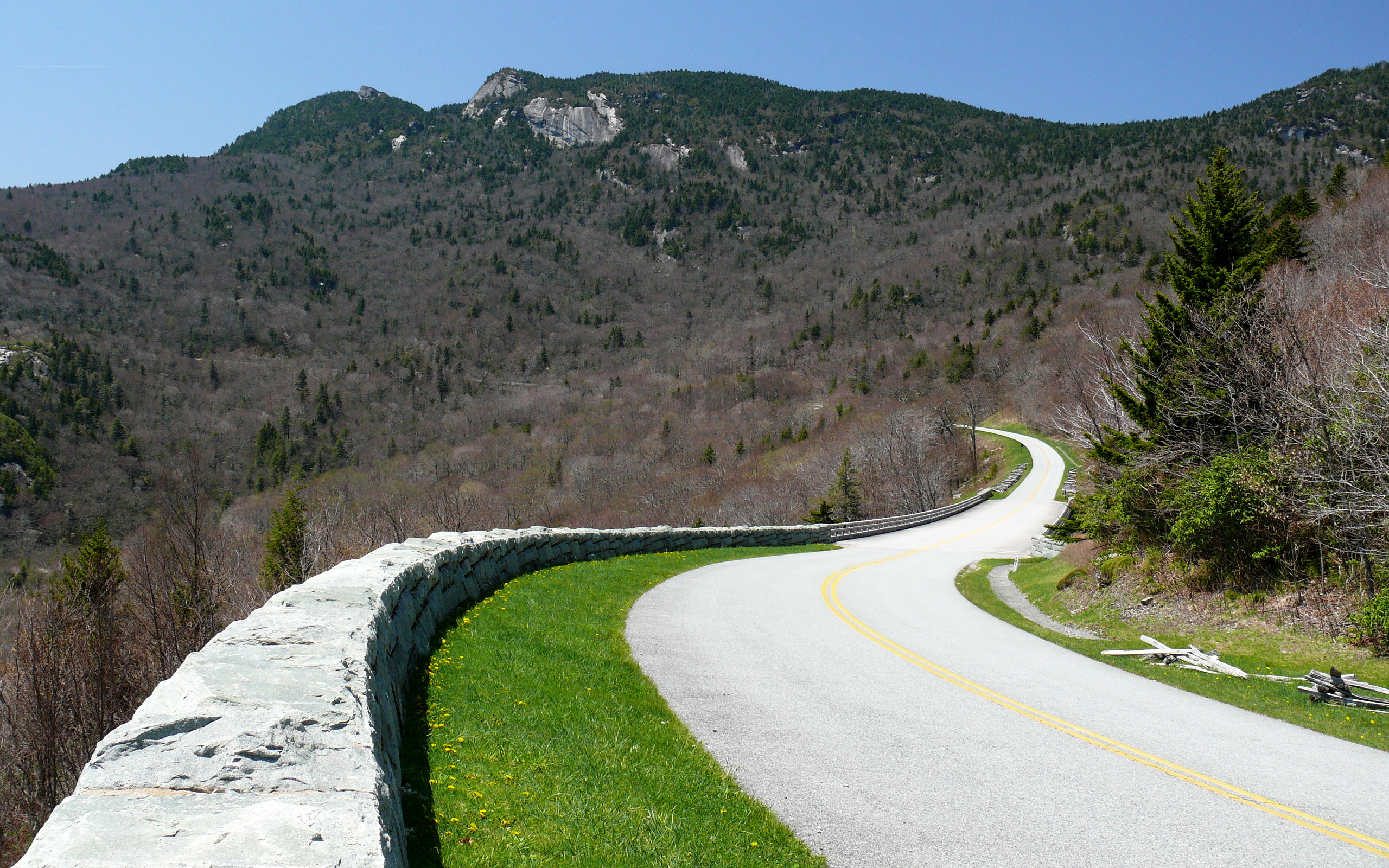
The Blue Ridge Parkway.

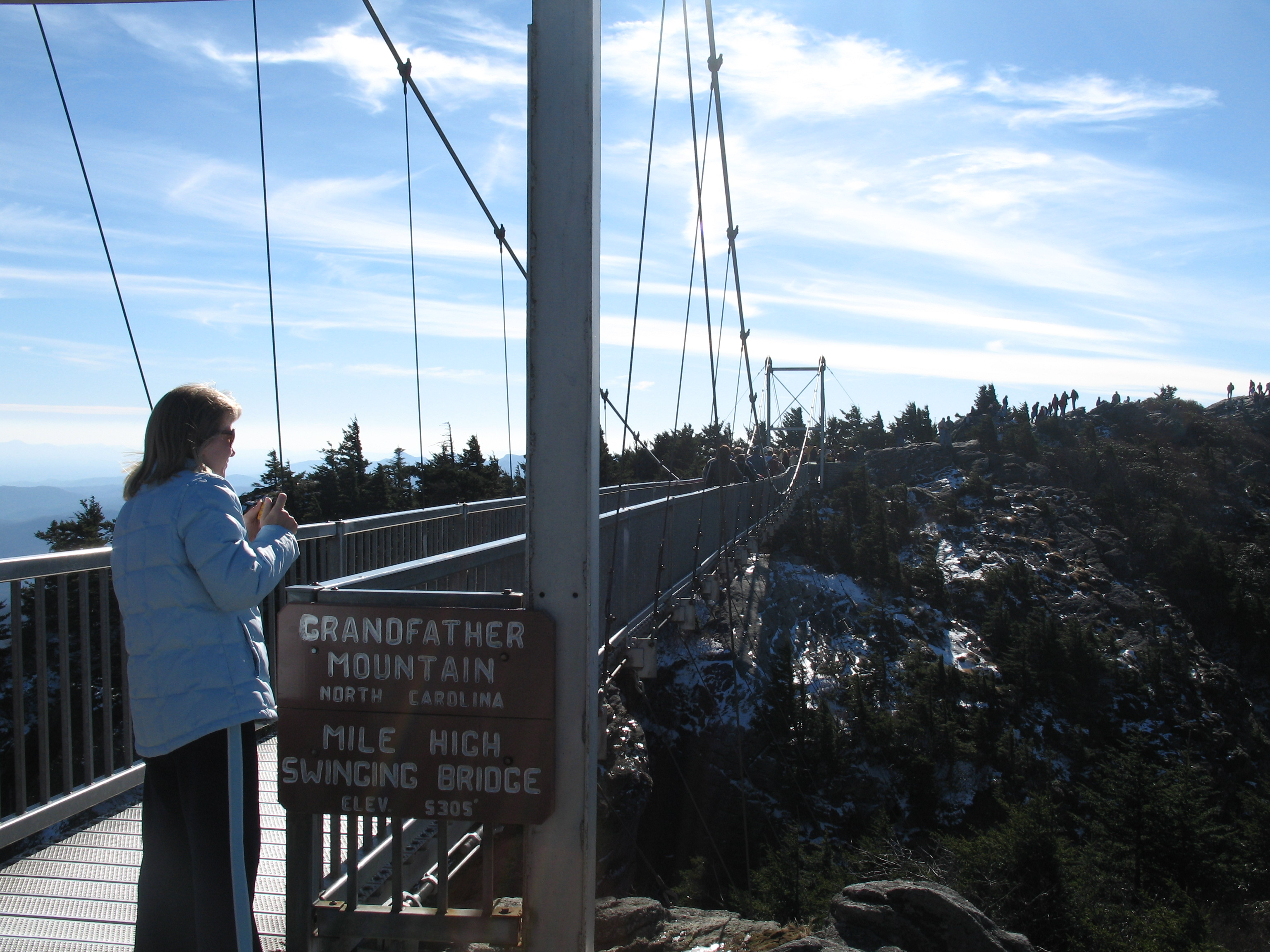
Mile-High Swinging Bridge.

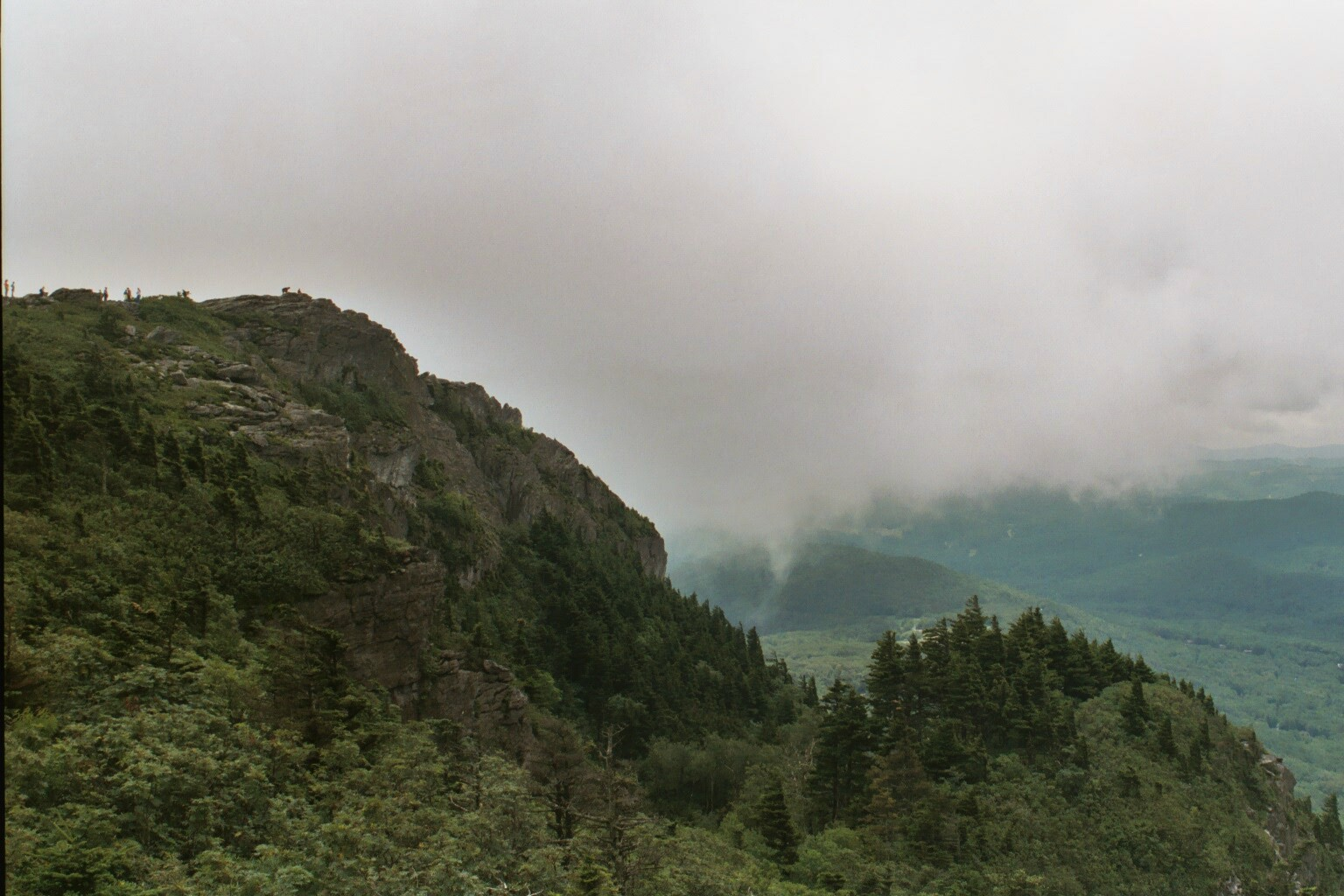
View of Linville Peak from Top Shop upper parking lot.

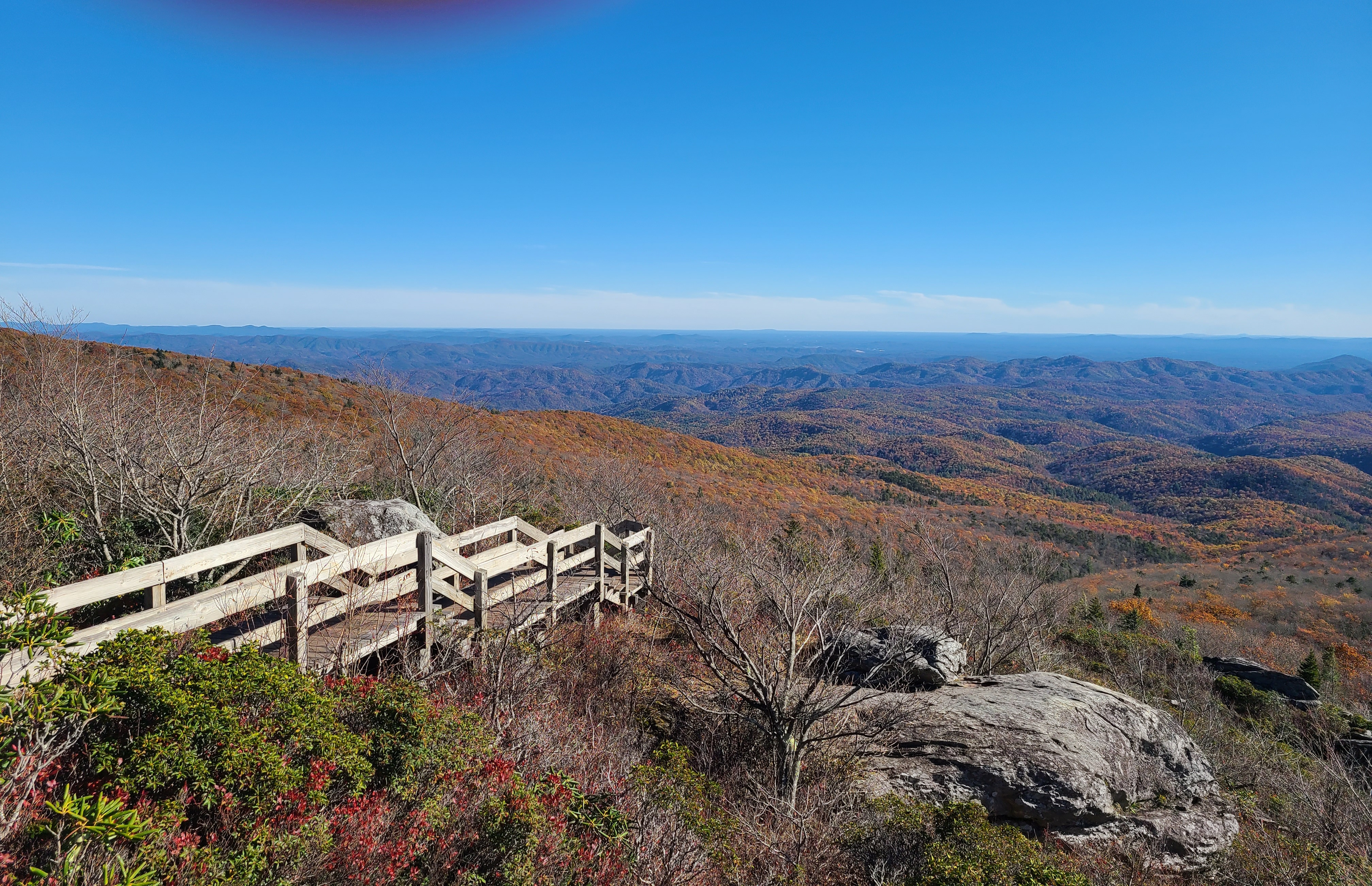
Rough Ridge Lookout at Grandfather Mountain.

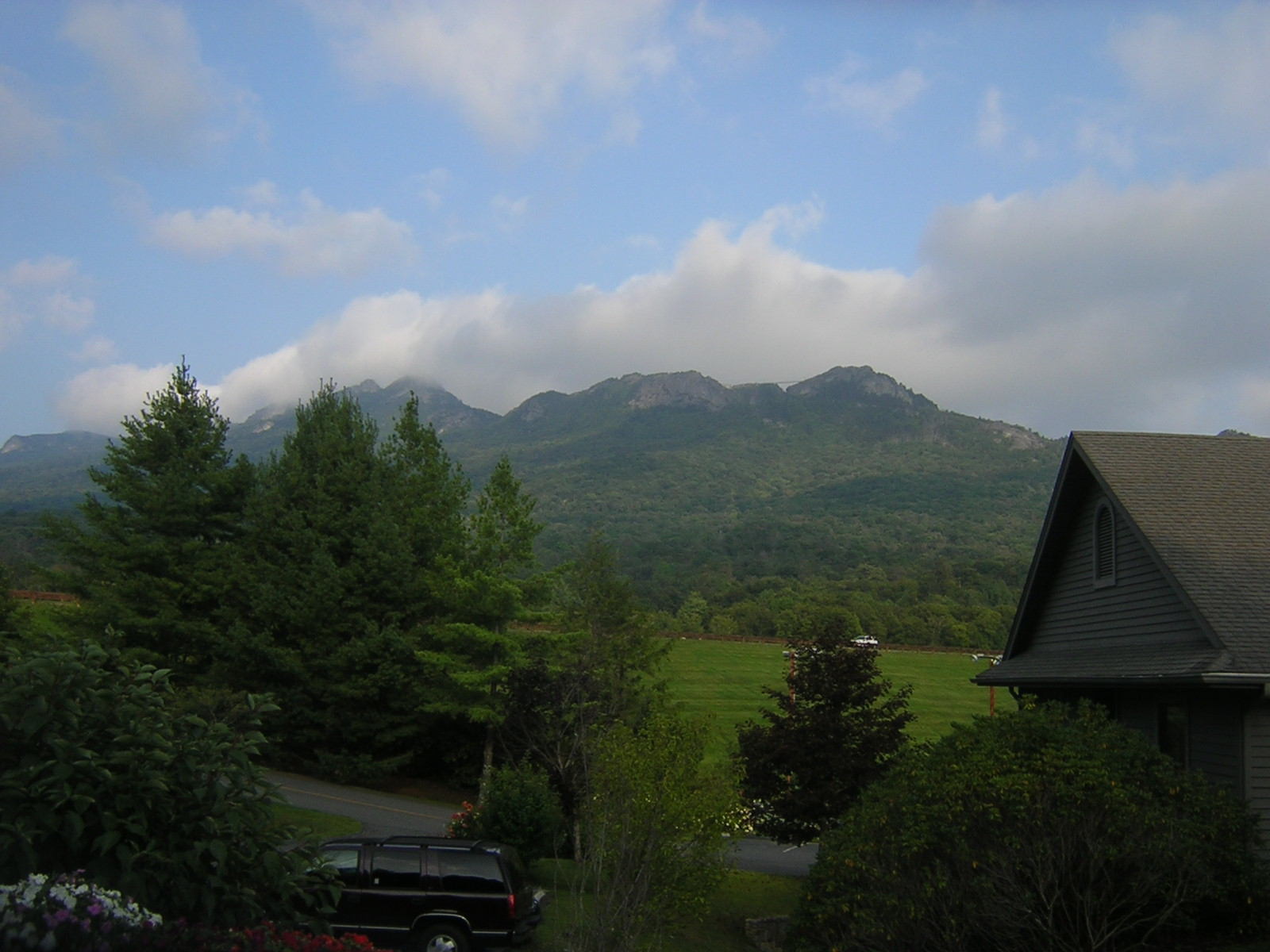
View from Grandfather Golf & Country Club entrance.

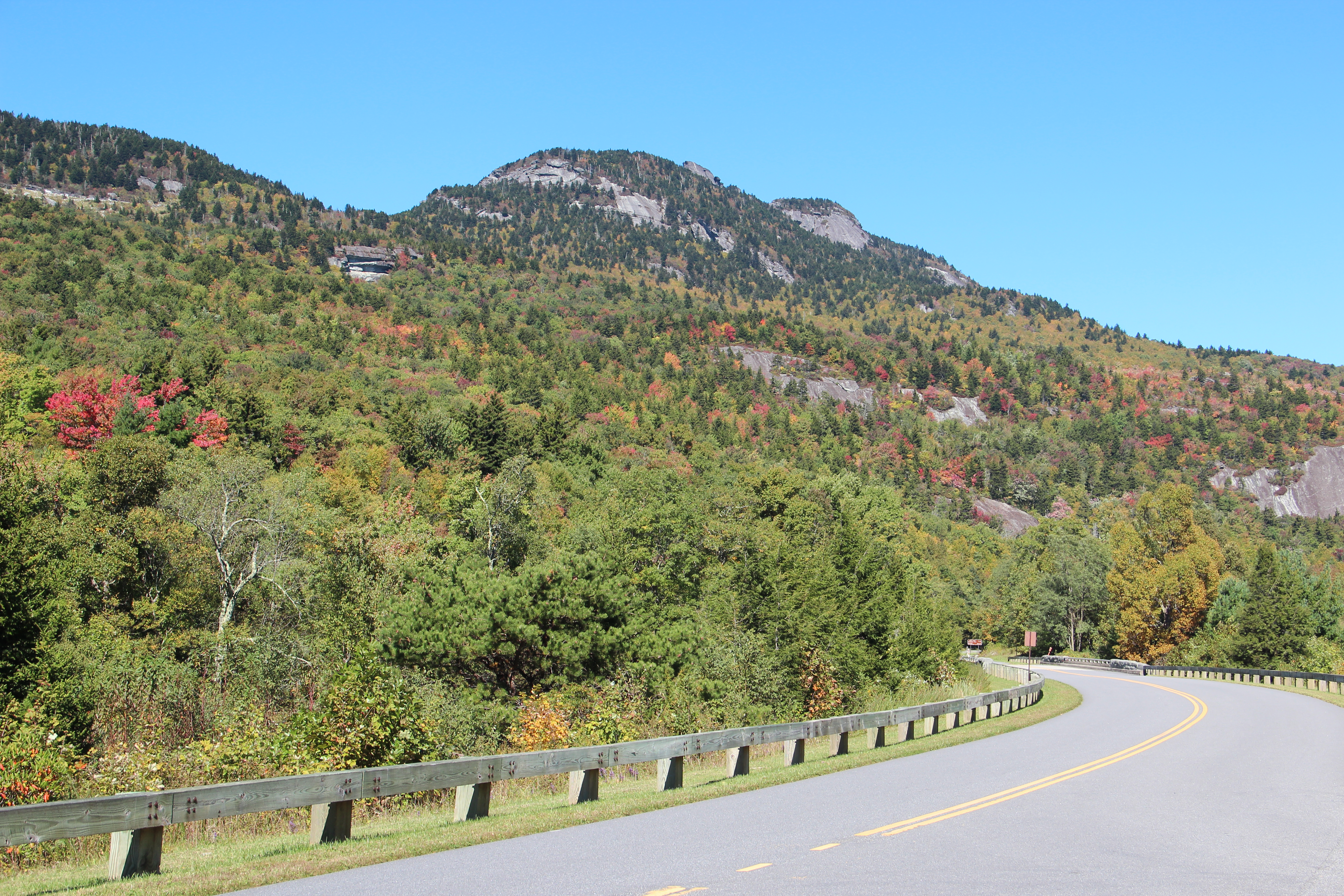
View from Beacon Heights.

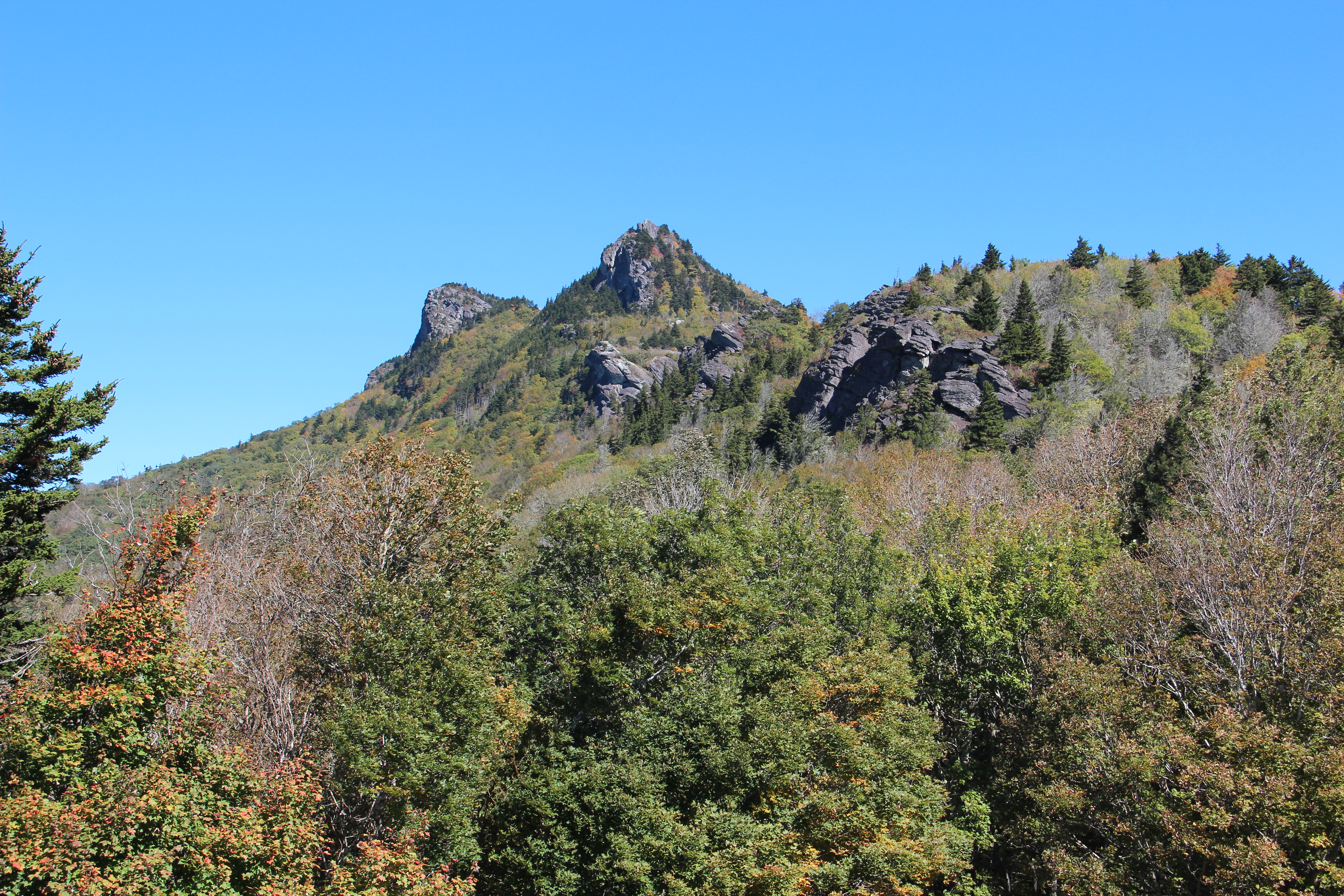
View from Half Moon Overlook.

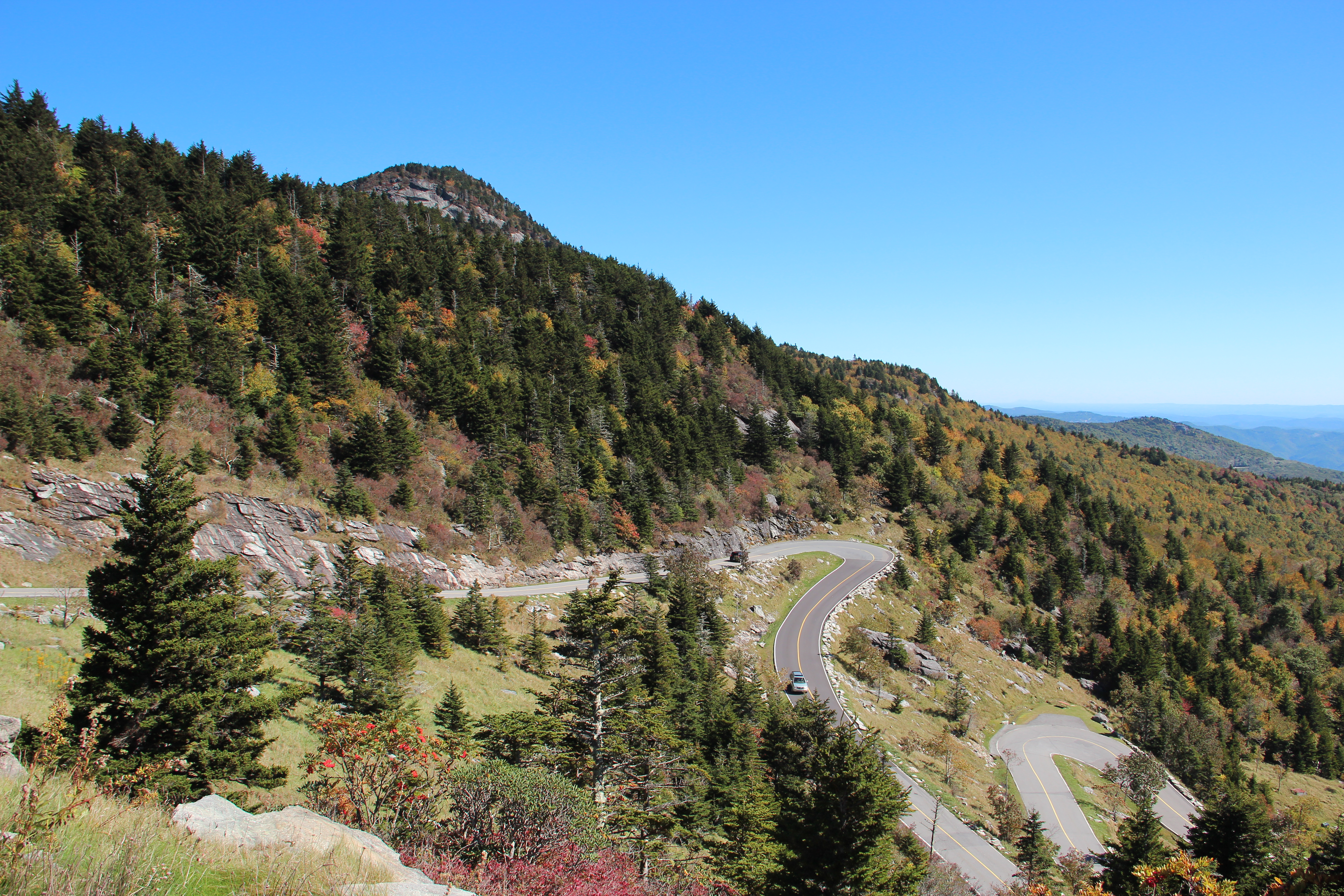
Hairpin turns on the mountain.

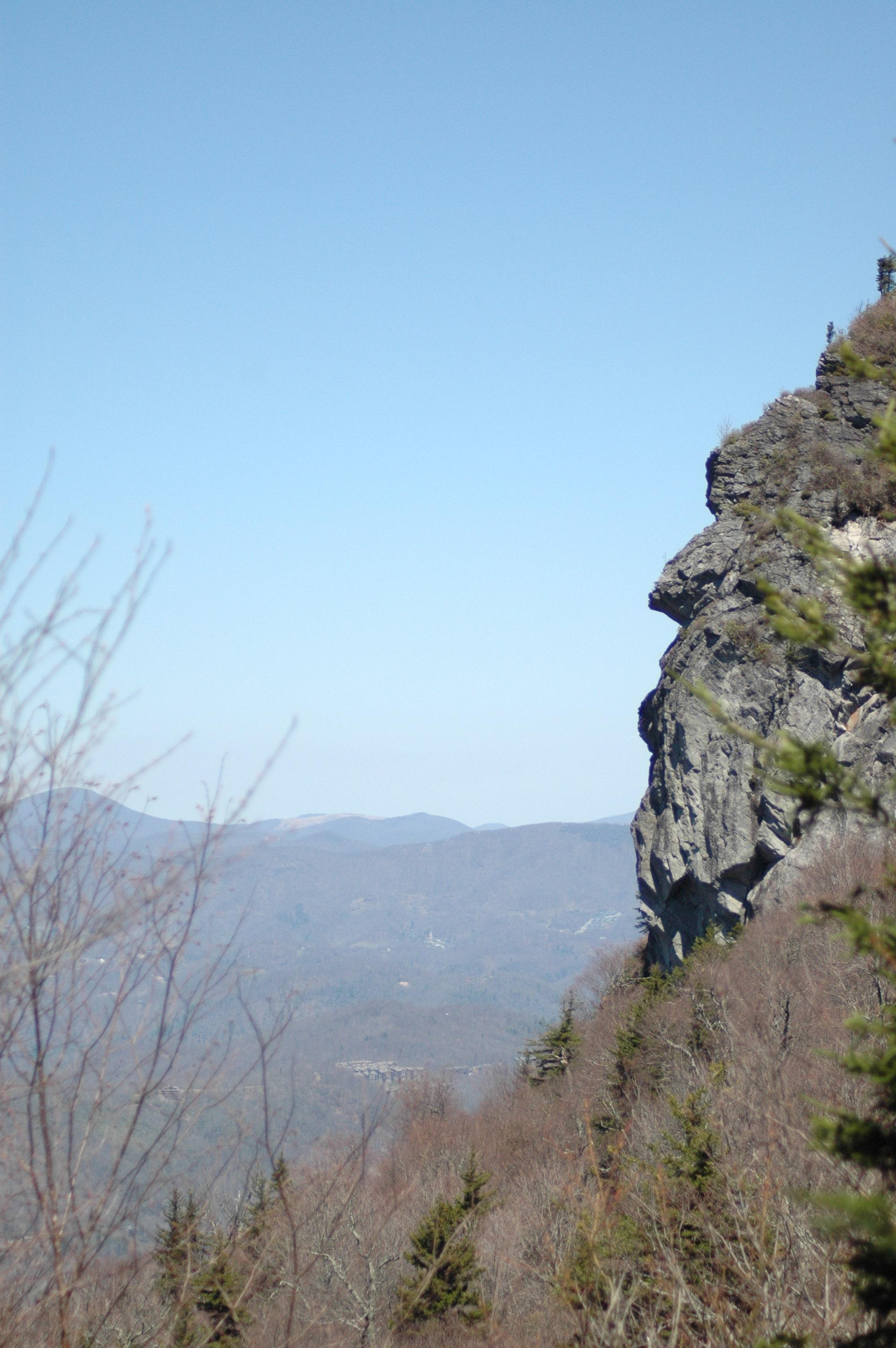
One of several "Grandfather" profiles on the mountain.

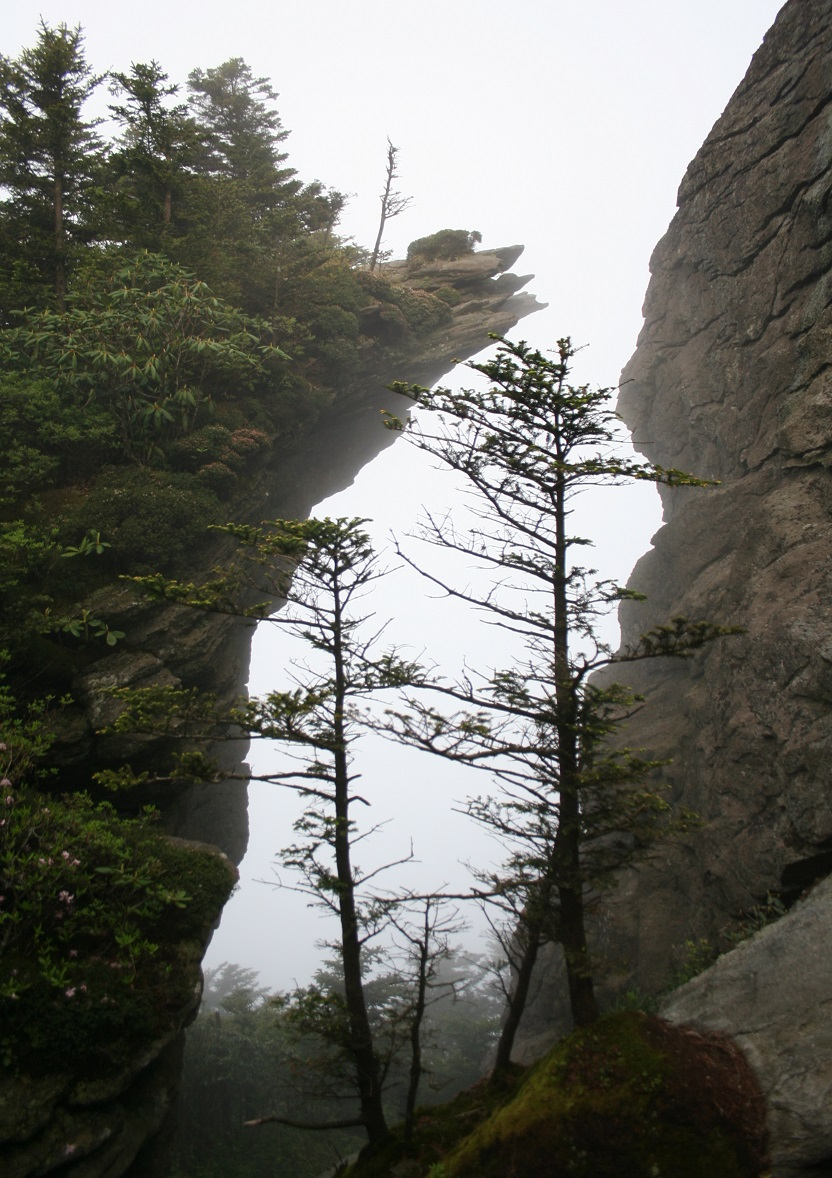
View from near MacRae Peak summit.

== Nearby state parks and forests ==
The following state parks and state forests are within 30 miles (48 km) of Grandfather Mountain State Park:

- Elk Knob State Park
- Lake James State Park
- Mount Jefferson State Natural Area
- Mount Mitchell State Park
- New River State Park
- Rendezvous Mountain State Park
- Roan Mountain State Park, Tennessee
- Tuttle Educational State Forest

The following are about 110 miles (177 km) from Grandfather Mountain State Park:

- DuPont State Forest (about 106 miles (171 km)).
- Brevard (about 110 miles (177 km)). The city of Brevard is near several trailheads in Pisgah National Forest.

== See also ==
- List of mountains in North Carolina
