= Hugh MacRae =

American businessman and insurrectionist (1865-1951)

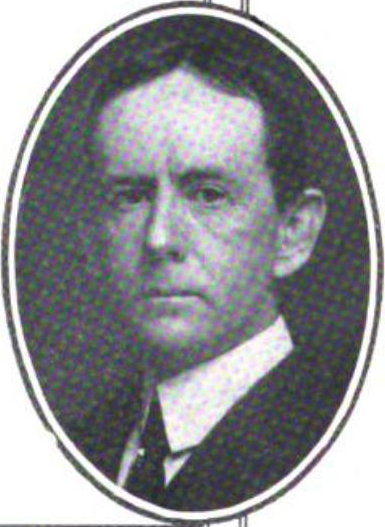
MacRae

Hugh MacRae (30 March 1865 – 1951) was an American businessman who served as a co-conspirator in the Wilmington massacre in 1898.

== Early life ==
MacRae was born in 1865 to a Scottish and English family in Carbonton, North Carolina; his grandfather was General Alexander MacRae, his father Donald MacRae, and his mother Julia Norton MacRae. His grandfather and father were businessmen: Alexander had established a railroad and held offices at the city and county levels, while Donald served as a consular official for the British government in Wilmington and invested in various companies. MacRae graduated from the Massachusetts Institute of Technology in 1885, thereafter moving to western North Carolina to be a mining engineer.

== Business ==
In 1890, MacRae established the Linville Improvement Company, a tourist enterprise for Linville. Following the death of his father in 1892, he took control of a Wilmington cotton business, investing considerably in the city's infrastructure.

Between 1905 and 1912, after reading a book on the topic of small-scale farming, MacRae established six farm colonies in the southeast portion of the state through one of his companies. The methods for these farms were intensive and small in scale; intended to be frugal, MacRae purposely settled them with European migrants (themselves recruited by MacRae's employees in Europe), thinking they were more capable than both the resident white and black farmers. MacRae was very pleased with the results of his experiment. He said that for the farmers, "superabundance of food was their main trouble", and suggested to occupy and put to "proper use" the remaining fertile, unused land in the United States. He believed that his advocacy for white immigration would solve "the race problem of the South".

== Wilmington massacre ==
MacRae was a member of the Secret Nine, an influential group of White, Democratic residents in Wilmington, who worked closely with the state's white supremacy movement. MacRae was instrumental in creating the White Man' Declaration of Independence, even rumored to have been the one to present the document to Alfred Moore Waddell. Like the rest of the white supremacy movement in Wilmington and North Carolina, Macrae worried that the white power in the state was waning and more economic and political power was being held by the black population of Wilmington. During the insurrection at least a dozen people were killed, with some claiming even higher totals, and Democrats were placed in office—MacRae became a city alderman.

== Death and legacy ==
He died in 1951. His hope that small-scale farming would transform the agricultural South never took hold, though newspapers at the time of his death said he had a considerable impact on farming practices.

He donated land to the county of New Hanover for the development of a park in his name, to be used by its white residents. In 2020 the park's name was changed to Long Leaf Park.
