= Virginia State Route 48 =

State highway in Virginia, US

State Route 48

Route information
- Maintained by VDOT and NPS
- Length: 321.2 mi (516.9 km)
- Existed: July 1935–present

Location
- Country: United States
- State: Virginia

Highway system
- Virginia Routes; Interstate; US; Primary; Secondary; Byways; History; HOT lanes
| ← US 48 | → SR 49 |

State Route 48 (SR 48) is the unsigned designation for the Blue Ridge Parkway and Skyline Drive from the North Carolina state line north to U.S. Route 340 (US 340) near Front Royal. Most of the road is maintained by the National Park Service, though the portion which is concurrent with SR 43 is maintained by the Virginia Department of Transportation (VDOT).

== Major intersections ==
| County | Location | mi | km | Destinations | Notes |
|---|---|---|---|---|---|
| Warren | | 0.0 | 0.0 | US 340 to I-66 – Skyline Caverns, Luray, Front Royal | Northern terminus |
| Page | Thornton Gap | 31.5 | 50.7 | US 211 – Washington, DC, Luray | Thornton Gap Entrance Station, interchange |
| Rockingham | Swift Run Gap | 65.5 | 105.4 | US 33 – Richmond, Harrisonburg | Swift Run Gap Entrance Station, interchange |
| Augusta | Rockfish Gap | 105.5 | 169.8 | US 250 to I-64 – Charlottesville, Waynesboro | South end of Skyline Drive and north end of Blue Ridge Parkway; One-quadrant interchange; I-64 exit 99; mileposts reset to zero here |
| Augusta | Reids Gap | 13.7 | 22.0 | SR 664 (Beech Grove Road / Reeds Gap Road) – Waynesboro | |
| Nelson | | 16.0 | 25.7 | SR 814 (Campbells Mountain Road) to SR 56 | Unpaved road |
| Nelson | | 16.1 | 25.9 | SR 814 (Love Road) – Sherando Lake | |
| Nelson | Tye River Gap | 27.1 | 43.6 | SR 56 – Montebello, Steele's Tavern | One-quadrant interchange |
| Rockbridge | Humphreys Gap | 45.5 | 73.2 | US 60 – Buena Vista, Amherst | One-quadrant interchange |
| Amherst | Otter Creek | 61.3 | 98.7 | SR 130 – Natural Bridge, Lynchburg | One-quadrant interchange |
| Bedford | | 63.9 | 102.8 | US 501 – Big Island, Glasgow | One-quadrant interchange |
| Bedford | Peaks of Otter | 85.9 | 138.2 | SR 43 south – Bedford | North end of SR 43 overlap; north end of VDOT maintenance of SR 43 (southern segment) |
| Botetourt | Powell Gap | 89.0 | 143.2 | SR 618 north | |
| Botetourt | Bearwallow Gap | 90.9 | 146.3 | SR 43 north – Buchanan | Two-quadrant interchange; south end of SR 43 overlap; south end of VDOT maintenance of SR 43 (northern segment) |
| Botetourt | | 105.9 | 170.4 | US 460 (US 221) – Bedford, Roanoke | Two-quadrant interchange |
| Roanoke | | 112.3 | 180.7 | SR 24 – Stewartsville, Vinton, Roanoke, Booker T. Washington National Monument | Two-quadrant interchange |
| Roanoke | | 115.2 | 185.4 | Blue Ridge Parkway Visitor Center, Virginia's Explore Park (Roanoke River Parkway) | |
| Roanoke | | 120.5 | 193.9 | Mill Mountain Park & Zoo, Historic Roanoke Star, Downtown Roanoke (Mill Mountain Parkway) | |
| Roanoke | | 121.4 | 195.4 | US 220 – Rocky Mount, Roanoke | Two-quadrant interchange |
| Roanoke | Adney Gap | 136.0 | 218.9 | US 221 | Connector road |
| Floyd | | 159.3 | 256.4 | SR 860 (Shooting Creek Road) | Former SR 109 |
| Floyd | Tuggle Gap | 165.1 | 265.7 | SR 8 – Floyd, Stuart | One-quadrant interchange |
| Floyd | | 174.0 | 280.0 | SR 799 (Conner Grove Road) | former SR 102 north |
| Floyd | | 174.1 | 280.2 | SR 758 (Woodberry Road) | former SR 102 south |
| Floyd | | 174.2 | 280.3 | SR 758 (Buffalo Mountain Road) | |
| Patrick | Meadows of Dan | 177.7 | 286.0 | US 58 (via US 58 Bus.) – Stuart, Hillsville | Parkway and US 58 grade-separated; two-quadrant interchange with US 58 Bus. |
| Patrick–Carroll county line | Willis Gap | 192.1 | 309.2 | SR 771 (Willis Gap Road) | |
| Carroll | | 199.0 | 320.3 | SR 608 (Lightning Ridge Road) | |
| Carroll | | 199.2 | 320.6 | SR 608 (Ranger Road) | |
| Carroll | Fancy Gap | 199.4 | 320.9 | US 52 to I-77 – Mt. Airy, Hillsville | Two-quadrant interchange |
| Grayson | Low Gap | 215.7 | 347.1 | SR 89 – Mt. Airy, Galax | One-quadrant interchange |
| Grayson | | | | Blue Ridge Parkway south | North Carolina state line; southern terminus |
1.000 mi = 1.609 km; 1.000 km = 0.621 mi: Concurrency terminus
