= Blue Ridge Parkway =

Scenic parkway in the United States

Blue Ridge Parkway
- Blue Ridge Parkway route map

Route information
- Maintained by National Park Service
- Length: 469 mi (755 km)
- Existed: June 30, 1936–present
- Tourist routes: Blue Ridge Parkway
- Restrictions: No commercial vehicles

Major junctions
- North end: US 250 / Skyline Drive in Rockfish Gap, VA
- US 60 in Humphreys Gap, VA; US 220 in Roanoke, VA; US 58 in Meadows of Dan, VA; US 52 in Fancy Gap, VA; US 21 in Alleghany County, NC; US 70 in Asheville, NC; US 25 in Buncombe County, NC; US 23 / US 74 in Balsam Gap, NC; US 19 in Soco Gap, NC
- South end: US 441 in Ravensford, NC

Location
- Country: United States
- States: Virginia, North Carolina

Highway system
- Scenic Byways; National; National Forest; BLM; NPS
- IUCN category V (protected landscape/seascape)
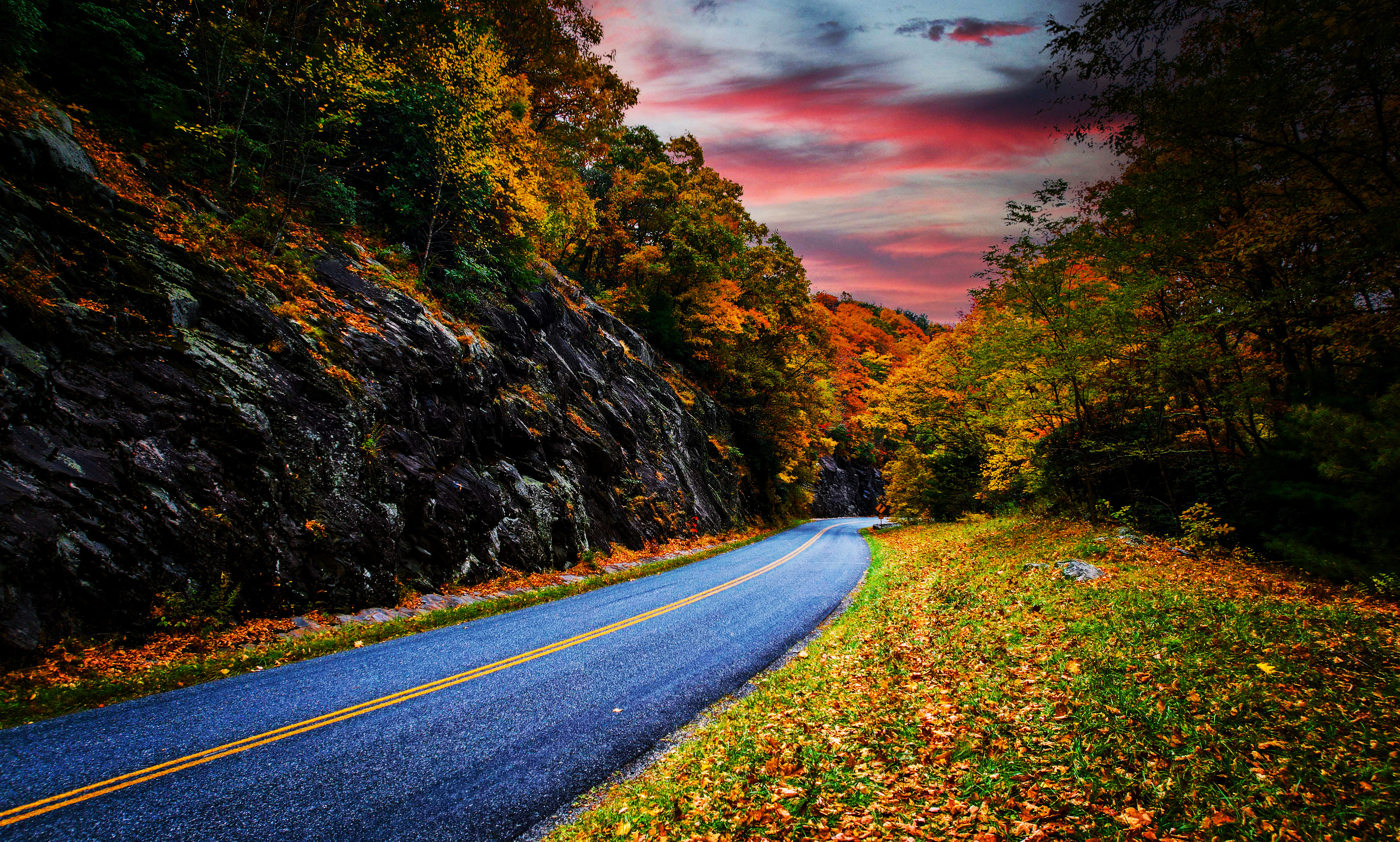
- Ice Rock Milepost 242
- Location: North Carolina & Virginia, USA
- Nearest city: Asheville, NC & Roanoke, VA
- Coordinates: 36°31′07″N 80°56′09″W
- Area: 93,390 acres (377.9 km^{2})
- Established: June 30, 1936
- Visitors: 16,533,753 (in 2025)
- Governing body: National Park Service
- Website: Blue Ridge Parkway

The Blue Ridge Parkway is a National Parkway and All-American Road in the United States, noted for its scenic beauty. The parkway, which is the longest linear park in the U.S., runs for 469 miles (755 km) through 29 counties in Virginia and North Carolina, linking Shenandoah National Park to Great Smoky Mountains National Park. It runs mostly along the spine of the Blue Ridge, a major mountain chain that is part of the Appalachian Mountains. Its southern terminus is at U.S. Route 441 (US 441) on the boundary between Great Smoky Mountains National Park and the Qualla Boundary of the Eastern Band of Cherokee Indians in North Carolina, from which it travels north to Shenandoah National Park in Virginia. The roadway continues through Shenandoah as Skyline Drive, a similar scenic road which is managed by a different National Park Service unit. Both Skyline Drive and the Virginia portion of the Blue Ridge Parkway are part of Virginia State Route 48 (SR 48), though this designation is not signed.

The parkway has been the most visited unit of the National Park System every year since 1946 except four (1949, 2013, 2016 and 2019). Land on either side of the road is owned and maintained by the National Park Service, and in many places parkway land is bordered by United States Forest Service property. There is no fee for using the parkway; however, commercial vehicles are prohibited without approval from the Park Service Headquarters, near Asheville, North Carolina. The roadway is not maintained in the winter, and sections that pass over especially high elevations and through tunnels are often impassable and therefore closed from late fall through early spring. Weather is extremely variable in the mountains, so conditions and closures often change rapidly. The speed limit is never higher than 45 mph (72 km/h) and is lower in some sections.

In addition to the road, the parkway has a folk art center located at mile marker 382 and a visitor center located at mile marker 384, both near Asheville. There are also numerous parking areas at trailheads for the various hiking trails that intersect the parkway, and several campgrounds located along the parkway allow for overnight stays. The Blue Ridge Music Center (also part of the park) is located in Galax, and Mount Mitchell (the highest point in eastern North America) is only accessible via North Carolina Highway 128 (NC 128), which intersects the parkway at milepost 355.4.

== Route description ==
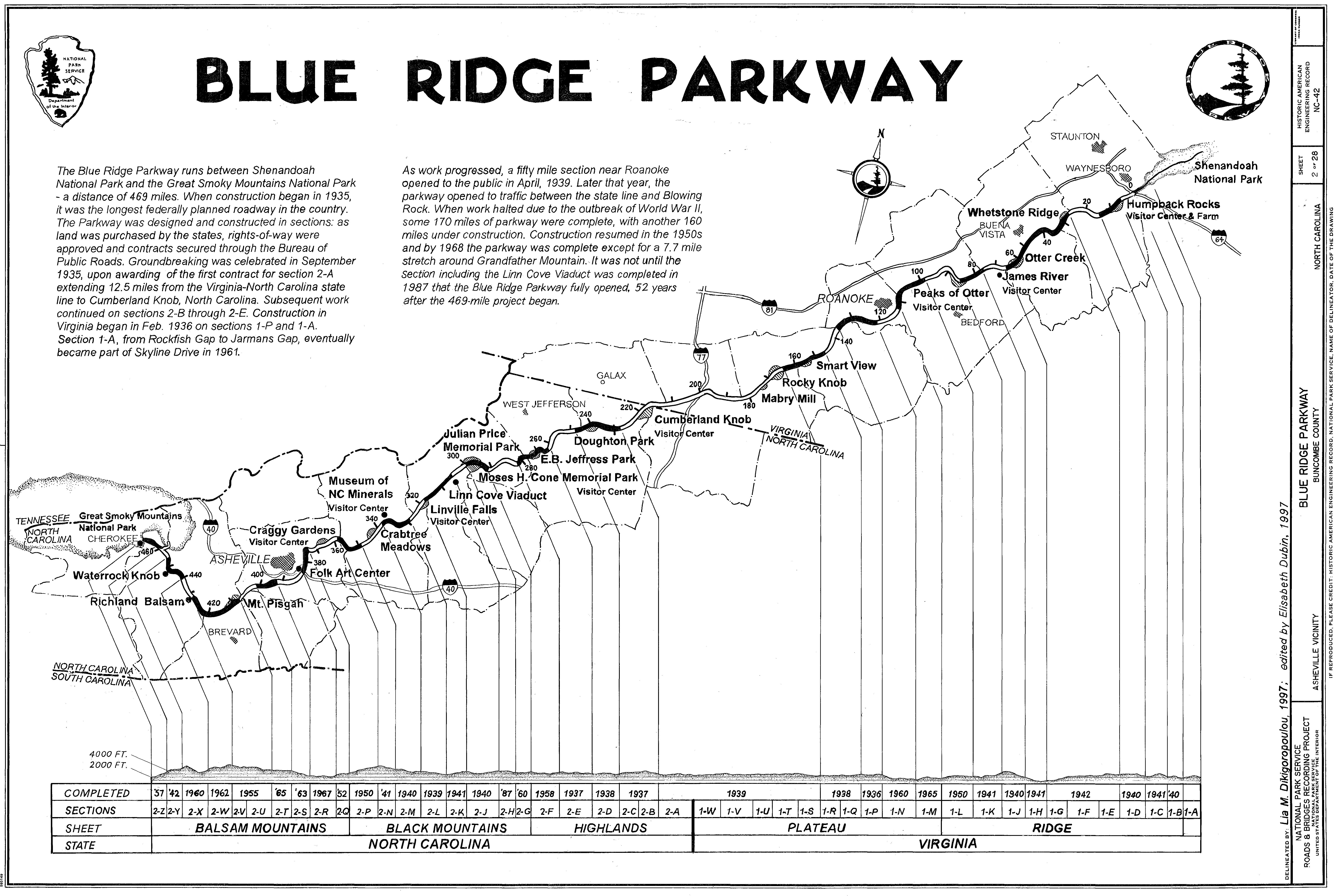
Schematic map of the Parkway

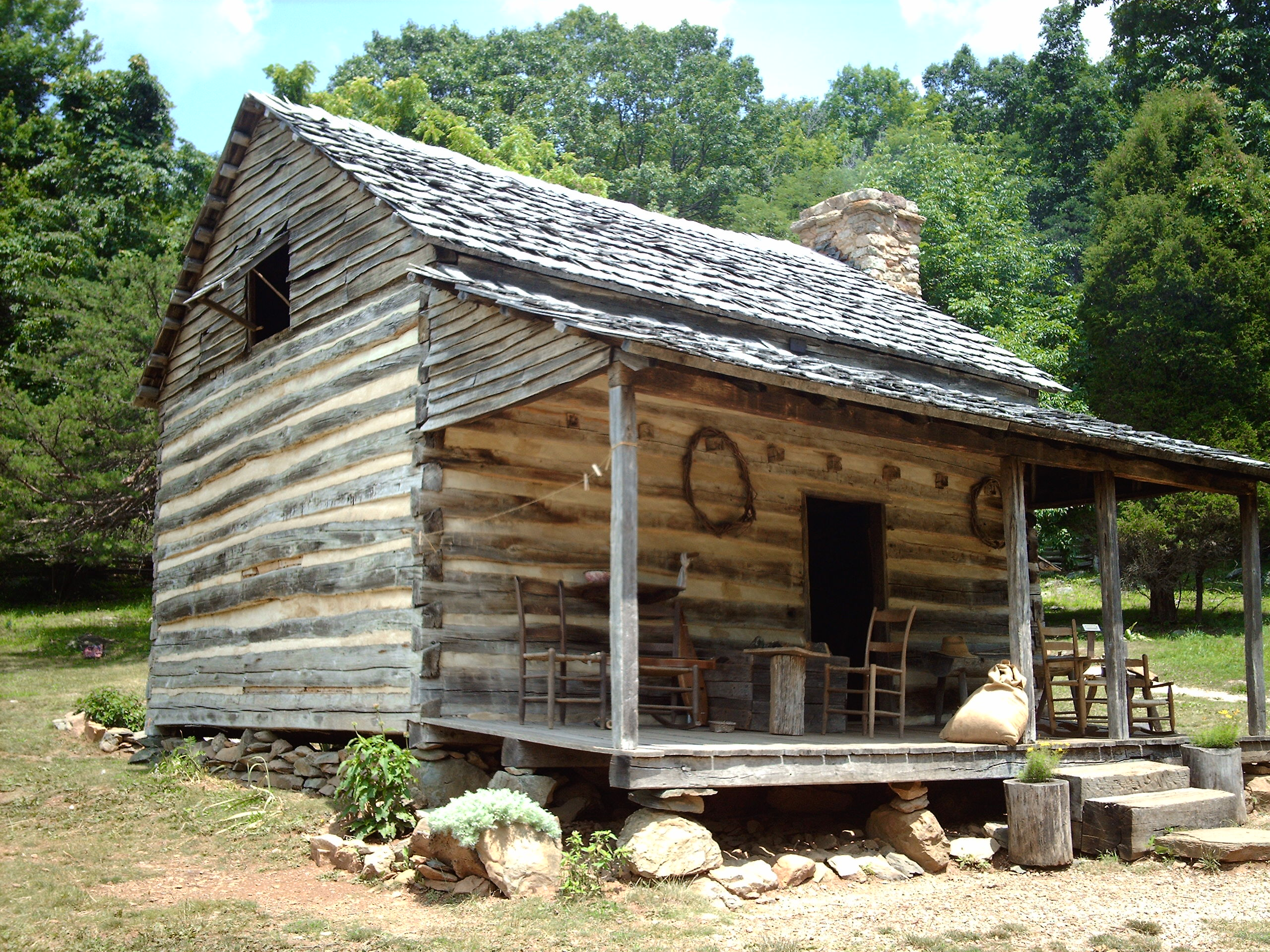
Farm at the Humpback Rock

The parkway runs from the southern terminus of Shenandoah National Park's Skyline Drive in Virginia at Rockfish Gap to U.S. Route 441 (US 441) at Oconaluftee in the Great Smoky Mountains National Park near Cherokee, North Carolina. It is an undivided two-lane expressway for most of its route. Access is controlled via interchanges with local roads and state/US highways. The parkway crosses (but does not interchange with) several Interstate Highways along its route and is carried across streams, railway ravines and cross roads by 168 bridges and six viaducts. Frequent pull-offs, rest areas, and scenic overlooks line the sides of the road. Outside of the Asheville, Boone and Roanoke areas, it largely avoids major population centers, and the road parallels several US and Interstate Highways along sections of its route, which are generally used for longer haul traffic. Because of this, the road and its vistas are designed to be the attraction itself, rather than merely a means of efficient travel. The use of interchanges and grade separation at cross roads is designed to allow for freer flowing traffic and better vistas than frequent intersections and stoplights would allow for.

The parkway uses short side roads to connect to other highways, and there are no direct interchanges with Interstate Highways, (Note: Though current plans for I-73 take it along current US 220 at its parkway interchange.) making it possible to enjoy wildlife and other scenery without stopping for cross-traffic. Mileposts along the parkway start at zero at the northeast end in Virginia and count to 469 at the southern end in North Carolina. The mileposts can be found on the right-hand side of the road while traveling southbound on the parkway. Major towns and cities along the way include Waynesboro, Roanoke, and Galax in Virginia; and in North Carolina, Boone and Asheville, where it runs across the property of the Biltmore Estate. The parkway has 26 tunnels constructed through rock—one in Virginia and 25 in North Carolina.

=== Cold weather ===
Much of the parkway is located at high elevation, with colder, wetter and windier conditions than in surrounding areas. The highest point on the parkway (south of Waynesville, near Mount Pisgah in North Carolina) is 6,053 feet (1,845 m) above sea level on Richland Balsam at milepost 431. Sections of the parkway may be temporarily closed to repair damage caused by the cold winter climate of the mountains or for other maintenance. The parkway's natural resource protection protocol limits the use of ice melting chemicals, and certain areas could remain closed for extended periods. During road closures alternative routes are used, but short-term closures may not have a signed detour route. Sections of the parkway near the tunnels are often closed in winter due to icy conditions.

=== Highlights in Virginia ===
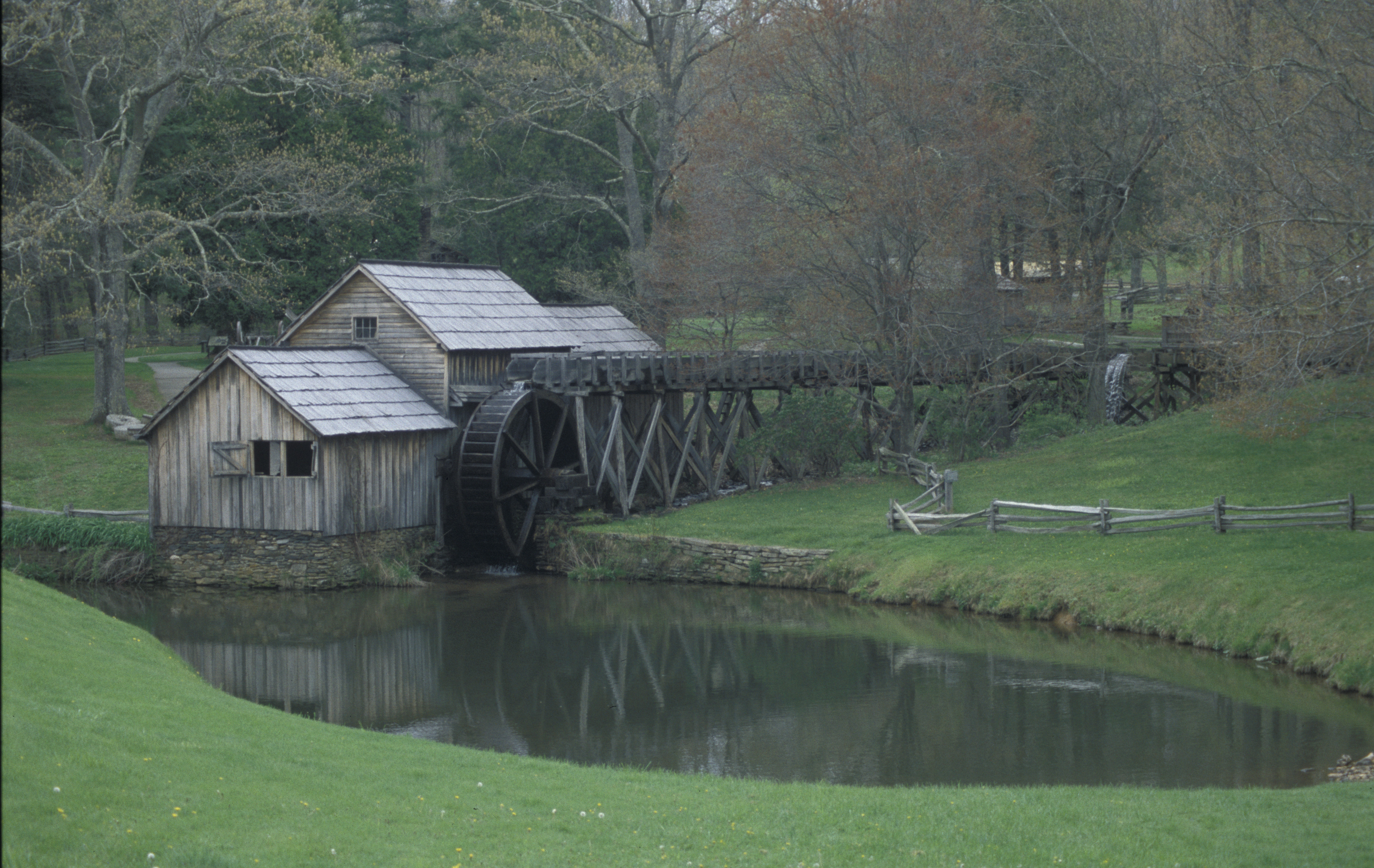
Mabry Mill

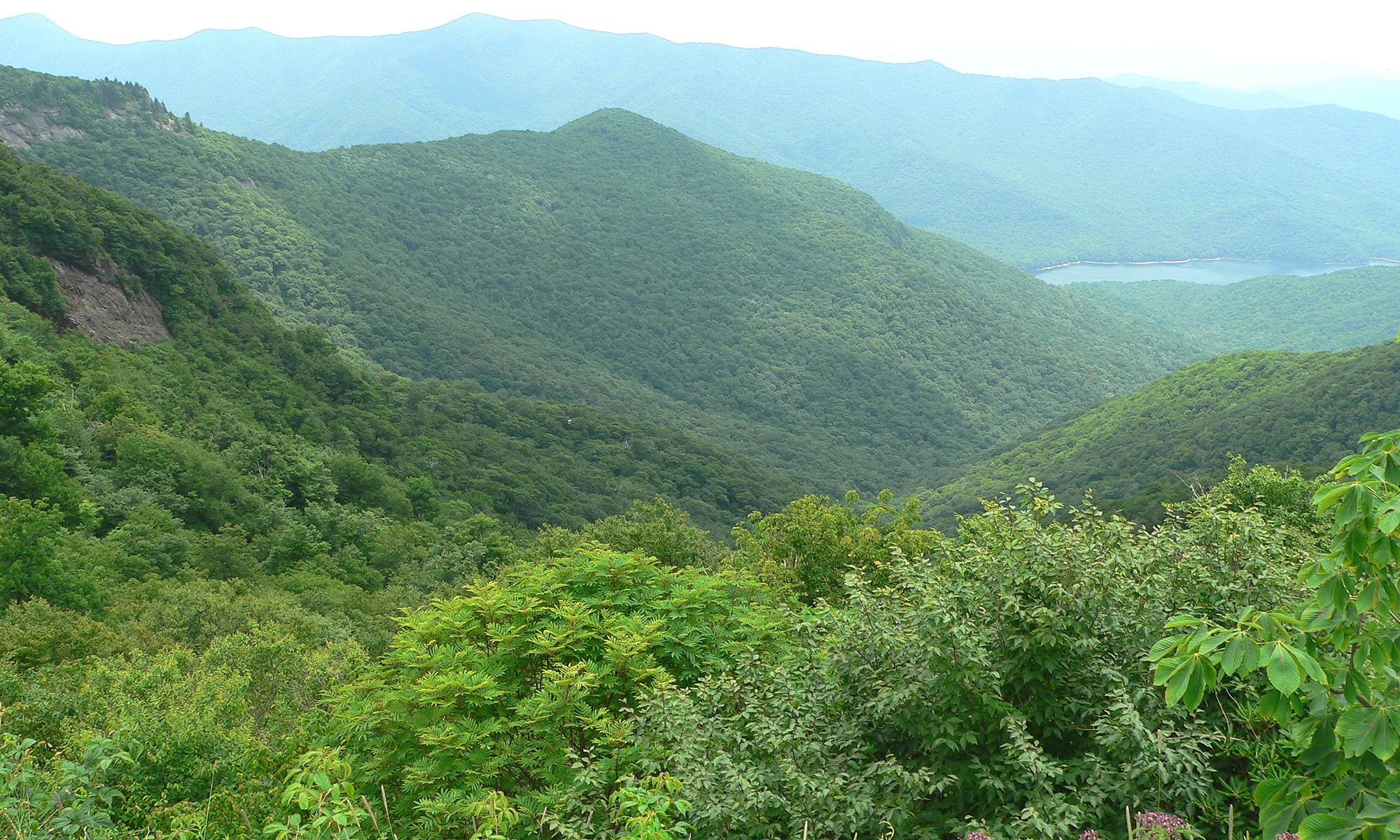
The view from Craggy Gardens on the Blue Ridge Parkway

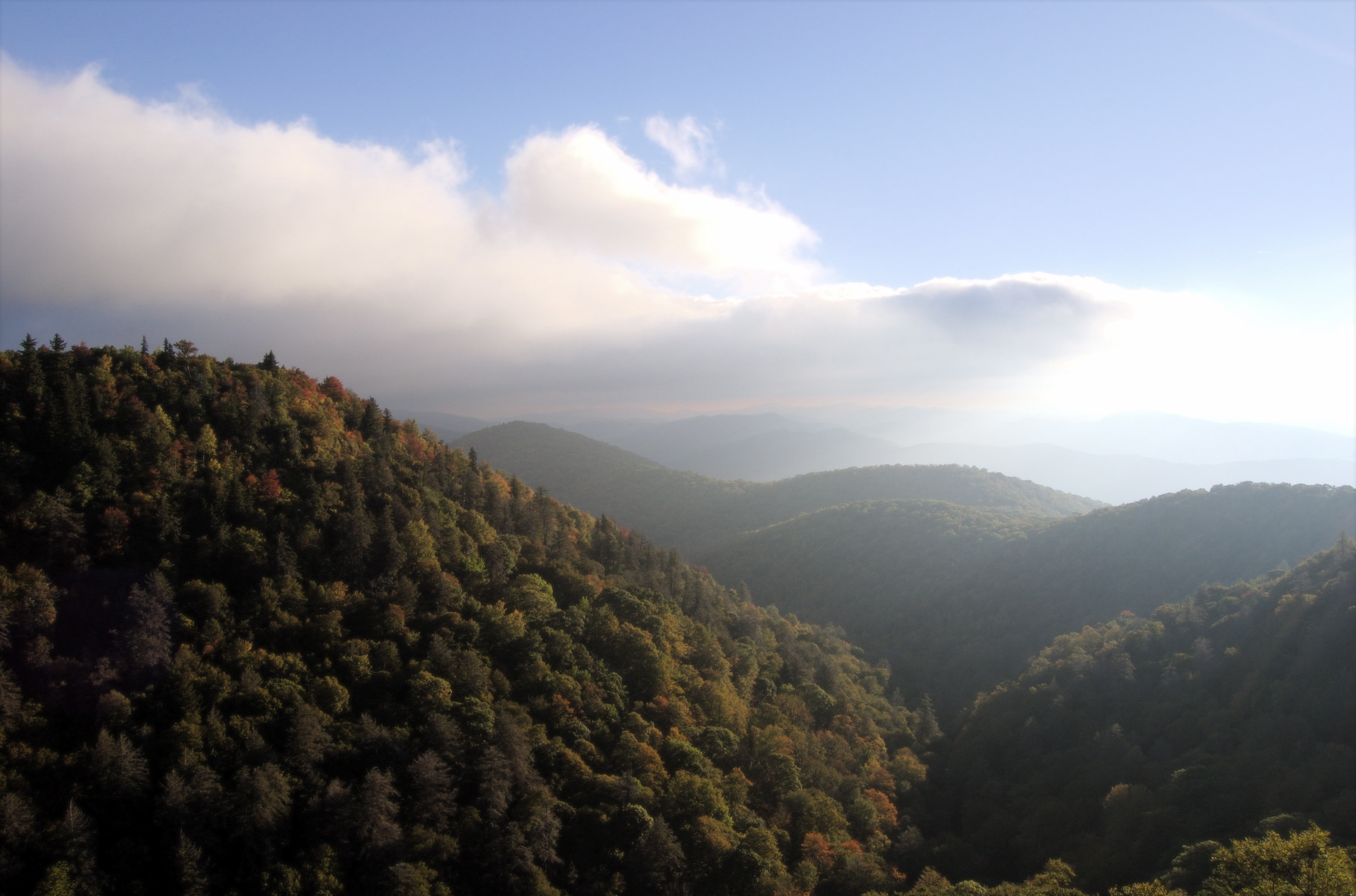
East Fork Overlook from Blue Ridge Parkway

- Mile 0 Rockfish Gap near Waynesboro, Virginia, is the northern end of the Blue Ridge Parkway. To the north the parkway connects directly to Skyline Drive, which winds 105 miles (169 km) through Shenandoah National Park.
- 5 to 9.3 Humpback Rock has a self-guiding trail through a collection of old Appalachian farm buildings. A hiking trail from the parking area (at mile 6.1) leads 0.75 miles (1.21 km) to The Rocks, whose humped appearance gives the area its name. Greenstone self-guiding trail (8.8).
- 10.7 Ravens Roost offers vistas of Torry Mountain and the Shenandoah Valley to the west. The overlook is built above a cliff, so it is frequently used for rock climbing and hang gliding. There is also a single picnic table.
- 16 Sherando Lake is a recreation area in George Washington National Forest 4.5 miles (7.2 km) from the parkway via VA 814. Swimming, picnicking, and camping.
- 29 Whetstone Ridge provided many a mountain man with a fine-grained sharpening stone.
- 34.4 Yankee Horse Ridge supposedly is where a hard-riding Union soldier's horse fell and had to be shot. A reconstructed spur of an old logging railroad provides access to Wigwam Falls.
- 58 to 63.6 Otter Creek runs 10 miles (16 km) down the Blue Ridge to the James River. Otter Lake (63.1), fishing, trail.
- 63.8 The James River and Kanawha Canal is where a footbridge leads across the river to the restored canal locks and exhibits. A self-guiding trail follows the river bluff.
- 71 Onion Mountain's short loop trail leads through rhododendron and mountain laurel.
- 83.4 Fallingwater Cascades can be seen along a 1.6-mile (2.6 km) loop trail.
- 84 to 87 Peaks of Otter are three mountain peaks which have been popular viewing sites since the days of Thomas Jefferson. A shuttle bus provides service to Sharp Top.
- 114.9 The Roanoke River Gorge is visible after a short walk.
- 120.4 Roanoke Mountain is a 3.7-mile (6.0 km) side trip. A one-way loop road, with steep grades, crosses over the mountain. Towed vehicles are prohibited.
- 129.6 Roanoke Valley Overlook gives a view of the largest city along the parkway.
- 154.5 Smart View is named for having "a right smart view". A nearby cabin built in the 1890s is known as a spot for viewing dogwood blooms in early May.
- 167 to 174 Rocky Knob Recreation Area overlooks Rock Castle Gorge.
- 176.1 Mabry Mill was operated by E.B. Mabry from 1910 to 1935. A trail leads to his gristmill, sawmill, blacksmith shop, and other exhibits. Old-time skills are demonstrated in the summer and fall.
- 188.8 Groundhog Mountain has a variety of rural fences: snake, Post-and-rail, picket and buck. Picnic grounds and observation tower are also nearby.
- 189.1 Groundhog Mountain
- 189.9 Aunt Orelena Puckett Cabin Exhibit was the home of an area midwife.

=== Highlights in North Carolina ===
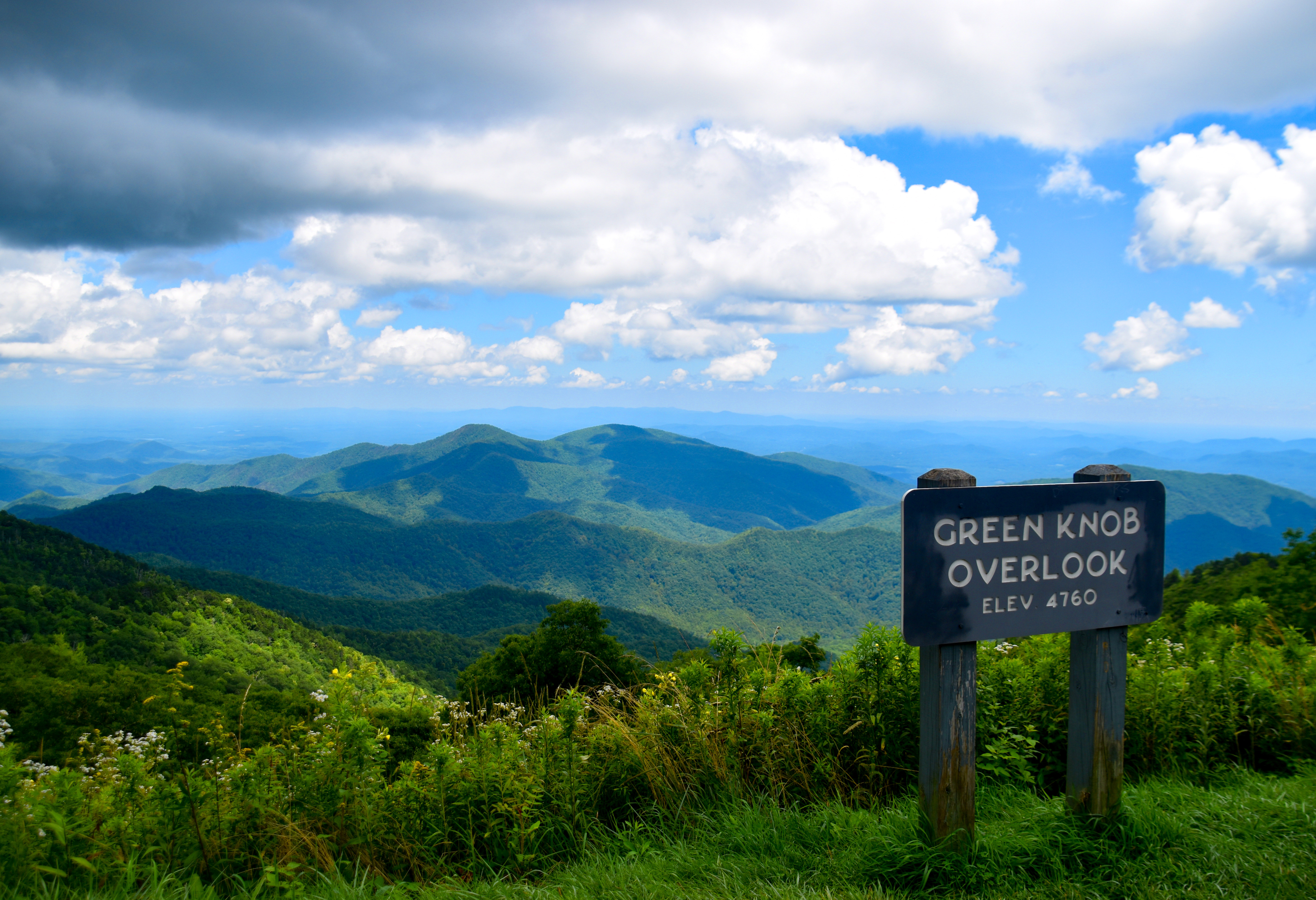
Green Knob Overlook

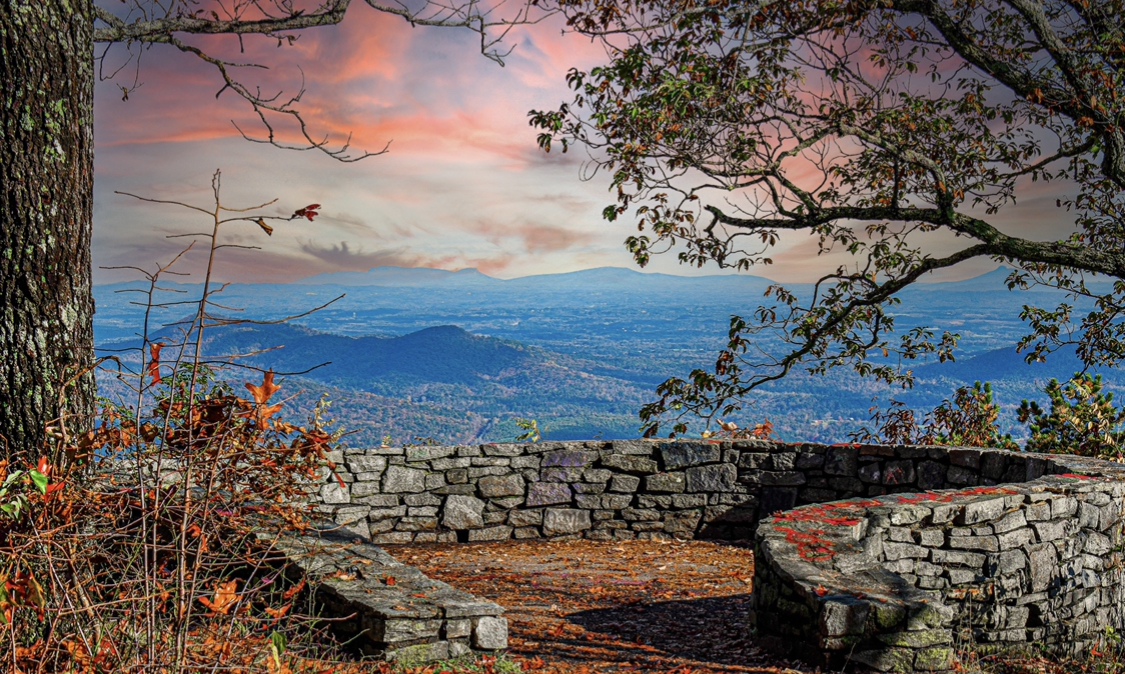
Fox Hunters Paradise Overlook Milepost 218.6

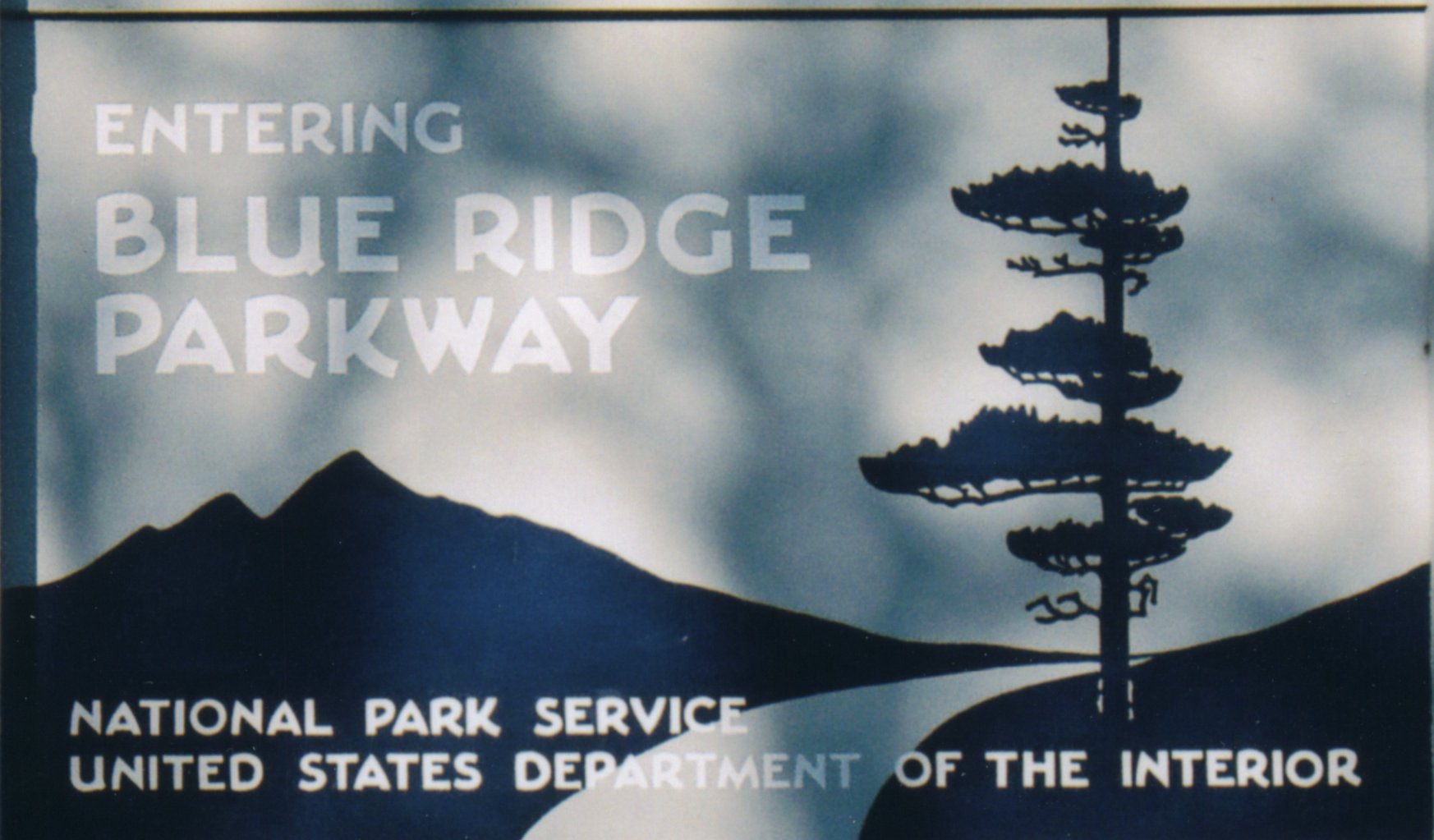
Sign marking the southern end of the Blue Ridge Parkway, near Great Smoky Mountains National Park

Sunrise at Fox Hunters Paradise, Milepost 218.6

Bluff Mountain Overlook, Milepost 52.8

The Blue Ridge Parkway crosses the North Carolina–Virginia state line at mile 216.9. The 1749 party that surveyed the boundary included Peter Jefferson, father of Thomas Jefferson.

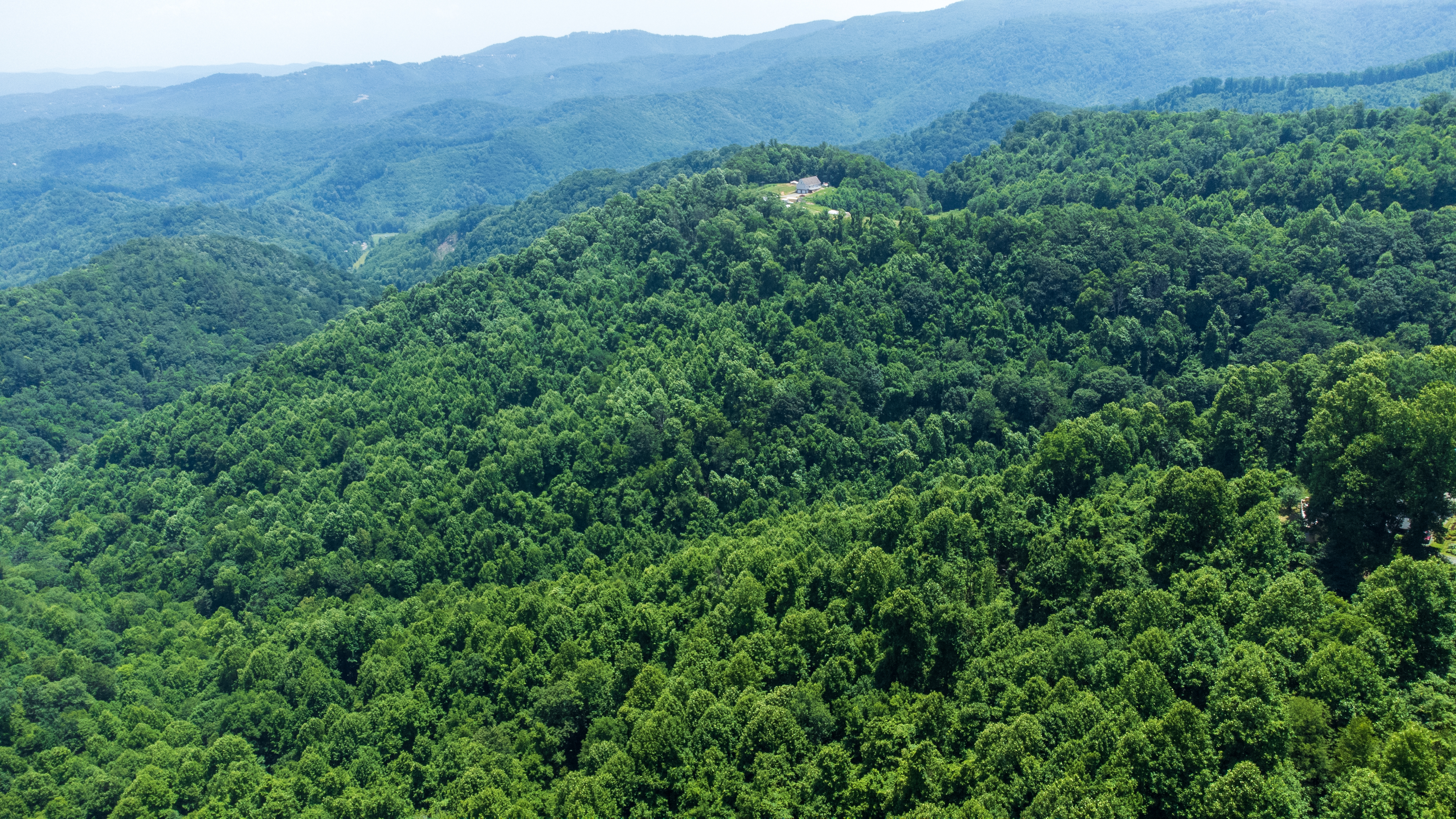
Grandview Overlook from the Blue Ridge Parkway

- Mile 217.5 Cumberland Knob, at 2,885 feet (879 m), is the centerpiece of a small parkway recreation area.
- 218.6 Fox Hunters Paradise, down a short walking path, is where hunters could listen to their hounds baying in the valley below.
- 238.5 Brinegar Cabin was built by Martin Brinegar about 1880 and lived in until the 1930s when the homestead was purchased from his widow for the parkway. The original cabin stands there today.
- 238.5 to 244.7 Doughton Park was named for Congressman Robert L. Doughton, a staunch supporter and neighbor of the parkway. The park has many miles of hiking trails, a lodge, dinner, picnic area and a campground.
- 258.6 Northwest Trading Post offers crafts from North Carolina's northwestern counties.
- 260.6 Jumpinoff Rock is at the end of a short woodland trail.
- 264.4 The Lump is a grassy knob that provides views of the forested foothills.
- 272 E. B. Jeffress Park has a self-guided trail to a waterfall known as the Cascades. Another trail goes to an old cabin and church.
- 285.1 Daniel Boone's Trace, which Boone blazed to the West, crosses near here.
- 292 to 295 Moses H. Cone Memorial Park has hiking, fishing and horse trails. Flat Top Manor, the former house of Moses H. Cone, is now used as the Parkway Craft Center.
- 295.1 to 298 Julian Price Memorial Park, the former retreat of the insurance executive Julian Price, offers a variety of hiking trails, campground, and 47-acre (190,000 m^{2}) Price Lake. This is the only lake on the parkway on which paddling is allowed.
- 304.4 Linn Cove Viaduct, the last segment of the parkway built, skirts the side of Grandfather Mountain. A visitor center is located nearby and provides access to a trail under the viaduct.
- 308.3 Flat Rock provides views of Grandfather Mountain and Linville Valley.
- 316.3 Linville Falls Recreation Area provides trails with overlooks of Linville Falls and the Linville Gorge. A campground and picnic area are also provided.
- 331 The Museum of North Carolina Minerals interprets the state's mineral wealth.
- 339.5 Crabtree Meadows & Crabtree Falls is a parkway recreation area with a picnic area, campground, giftshop and hiking trails.
- 349.2 Laurel Knob provides views of Grandfather Mountain, Linville Mountain, Hawksbill Mountain, and Table Rock.
- 355.4 Mount Mitchell State Park, reached via NC 128, is the highest point east of the Mississippi River.
- 359.8 Walker Knob, formerly known as Balsam Gap, is located where the Black Mountains and the Great Craggy Mountains meet.
- 361.2 Glassmine Falls is an 800-foot (240 m) ephemeral waterfall visible from an overlook on the side of the parkway.
- 363.4 to 369.6 Craggy Gardens in the Great Craggy Mountains are covered with purple rhododendron in mid-to-late June. Craggy Pinnacle Trail and other trails (364.1 and 364.6); road to picnic area and trails (367.6).
- 382 The Folk Art Center is the flagship facility of the Southern Highland Craft Guild. It offers sales and exhibits of traditional and contemporary crafts of the Appalachian region. There are interpretive programs, three galleries, a library and a book store.
- 384 The Blue Ridge Parkway Visitor Center is the newest along the parkway. Exhibits focus on the history and heritage of the parkway and western North Carolina.
- 408.6 Mount Pisgah was part of the Biltmore Estate. The estate became home of the first forestry school in America and the nucleus of the Pisgah National Forest. Also located here is the Pisgah Inn resort, a park service concession.
- 417 Looking Glass Rock is visible from many spots on the parkway starting at Mount Pisgah.
- 418 East Fork Overlook. Located here are the headwaters of the Pigeon River. Yellowstone Falls is a short distance away and gets its name from the yellowish moss covering the rocks.
- 420.2 Shining Rock Wilderness is the largest wilderness area in North Carolina, covering 18,483 acres (74.80 km^{2}), with 25 miles (40 km) of trails and peaks over 6,000 ft (1,800 m). The wilderness is named for Shining Rock.
- 420.2 Black Balsam Knob is a grassy bald with panoramic views just outside the Shining Rock Wilderness in Pisgah National Forest. The wilderness area also includes Cold Mountain.
- 422.4 Devil's Courthouse is a rugged exposed mountaintop rich in Cherokee traditions.
- 423.5 Herrin Knob Overlook. A hiking trail goes around Tanasee Bald and Herrin Knob. Tanasee Bald (423.7) is said to be the home of the mythical Cherokee giant Tsul 'Kalu.
- 431 Richland Balsam is the highest point on the parkway at 6,053 feet (1,845 m). There is a self-guiding trail that passes through a remnant spruce-fir forest.
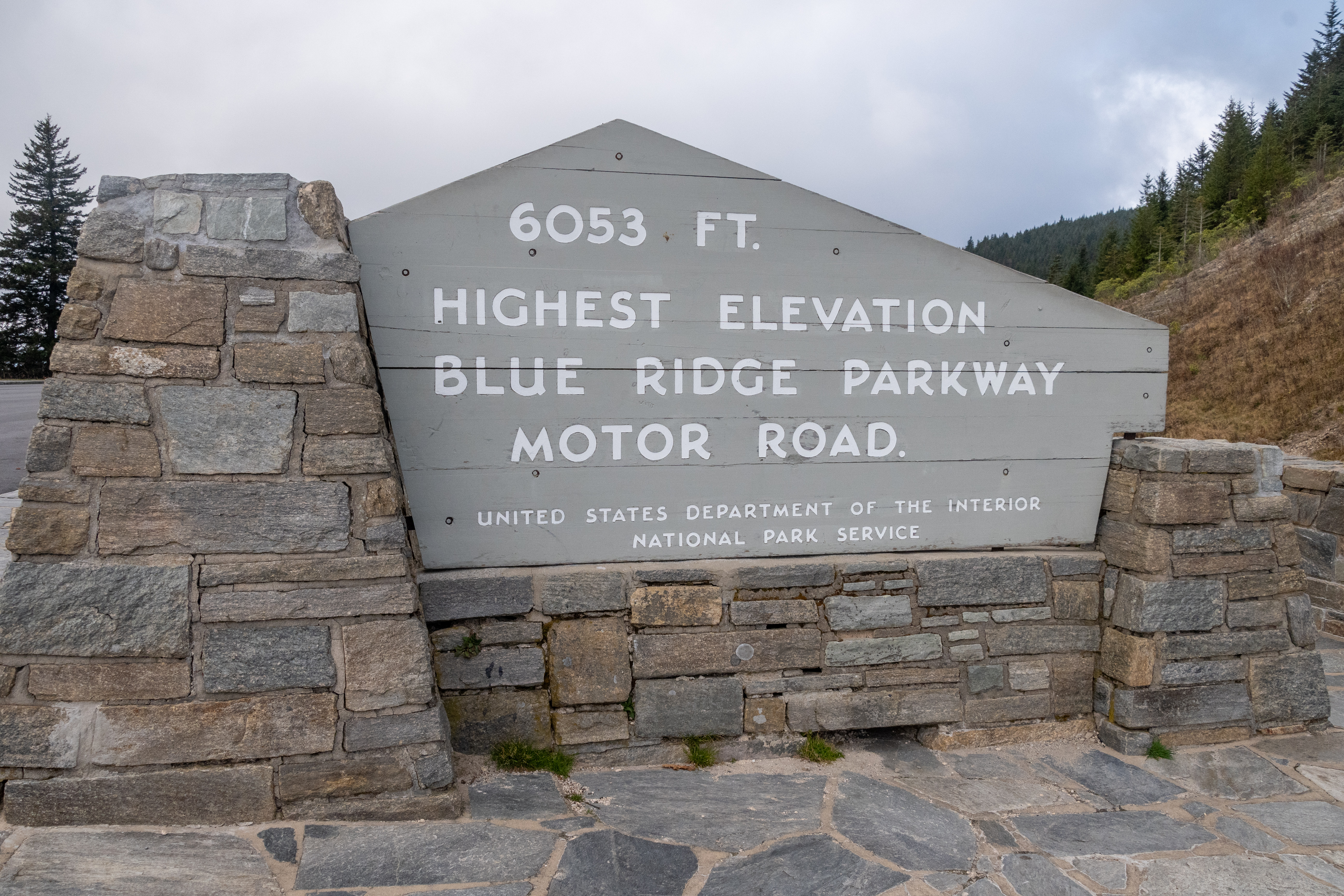
- Richland Balsam Overlook, Milepost 431
  435.7 Licklog Ridge once hosted cattlemen and their herds of cattle before it became part of the national forest. The area earns its name from the cattlemen who would place rocks of salt into logs and holes in the earth.
- 451.2 Waterrock Knob provides a panorama of the Great Smokies, visitor center, trail, comfort station, exhibits.
- 458.2 Heintooga Ridge Road runs north from the parkway 8.8 miles (14.2 km) to Heintooga Overlook in Great Smoky Mountains National Park.
- Mile 469 The southern end of the Blue Ridge Parkway intersects with U.S. 441 in Great Smoky Mountains National Park near Cherokee, North Carolina.

== History ==
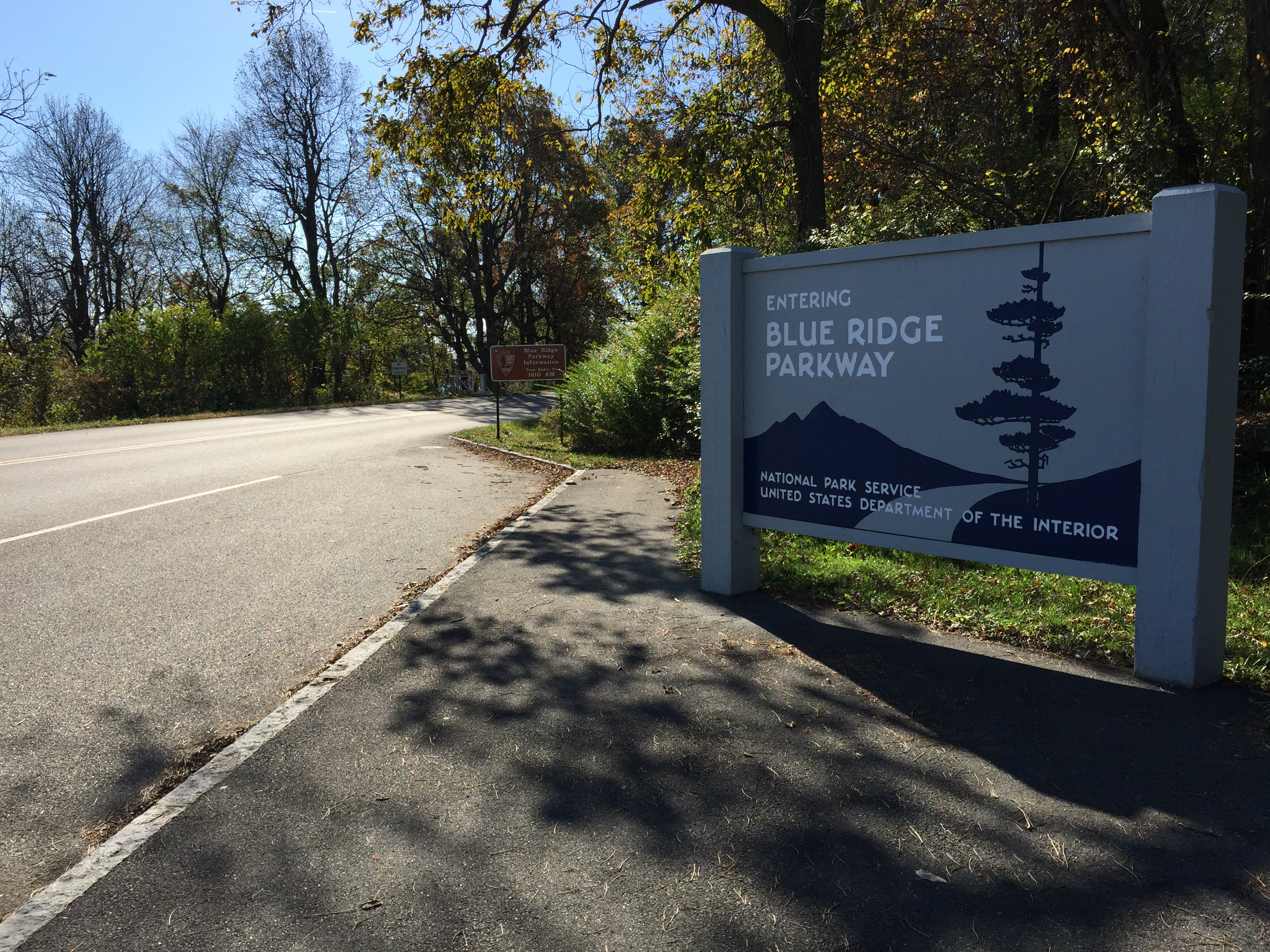
View south at the north end of the parkway at Rockfish Gap, Virginia

Begun during the administration of President Franklin D. Roosevelt, the project was originally called the Appalachian Scenic Highway.

Original plans called for the parkway to connect Shenandoah National Park and Great Smoky Mountains National Park with the parkway either turning west into Tennessee at Linville, North Carolina, or continuing southward through North Carolina. Secretary of the Interior Harold L. Ickes put together a three-person panel to study the possible routes the parkway could take. That panel, named after its chairman George L.P. Radcliffe, recommended the Tennessee route. However, Roosevelt had remained friends with Josephus Daniels, Roosevelt's superior as Secretary of the Navy during World War I. Daniels wanted the parkway to go through North Carolina and persuaded Ickes to choose the North Carolina route. The Bruce Bowers documentary The Blue Ridge Parkway: The Long and Winding Road gives Congressman Robert Doughton the credit for getting the route changed. The documentary claims Doughton worked to pass the Social Security Act only after getting the route changed.

Most construction was carried out by private contractors under federal contracts under an authorization by Ickes in his role as federal public works administrator. Work began on September 11, 1935, near Cumberland Knob in North Carolina; construction in Virginia began the following February. On June 30, 1936, Congress formally authorized the project as the Blue Ridge Parkway and placed it under the jurisdiction of the National Park Service. Some work was carried out by various New Deal public works agencies. The Works Progress Administration did some roadway construction. Crews from the Emergency Relief Administration carried out landscape work and development of parkway recreation areas. Personnel from four Civilian Conservation Corps camps worked on roadside cleanup, roadside plantings, grading slopes, and improving adjacent fields and forest lands. During World War II, the CCC crews were replaced by conscientious objectors in the Civilian Public Service program.

The parkway's construction created jobs in the region, but also displaced many residents and created new rules and regulations for landowners, including requirements related to how farmers could transport crops. Residents could no longer build on their lands without permission, or develop land except for agricultural use. They were not permitted to use the parkway for any commercial travel but were required to transport equipment and materials on side roads.

The Eastern Band of Cherokee Indians were also affected by the parkway, which was built through their lands. From 1935 to 1940, they resisted giving up the right-of-way through the Qualla Boundary, and they were successful in gaining more favorable terms from the U.S. government. Specifically, the revised bill "specified the parkway route, assured the $40,000 payment for the tribe's land, and required the state to build [a] regular highway through the Soco Valley". (The highway referred to is part of U.S. Route 19.) Cherokee leaders participated in the dedications when the Cherokee sections opened in the 1950s.

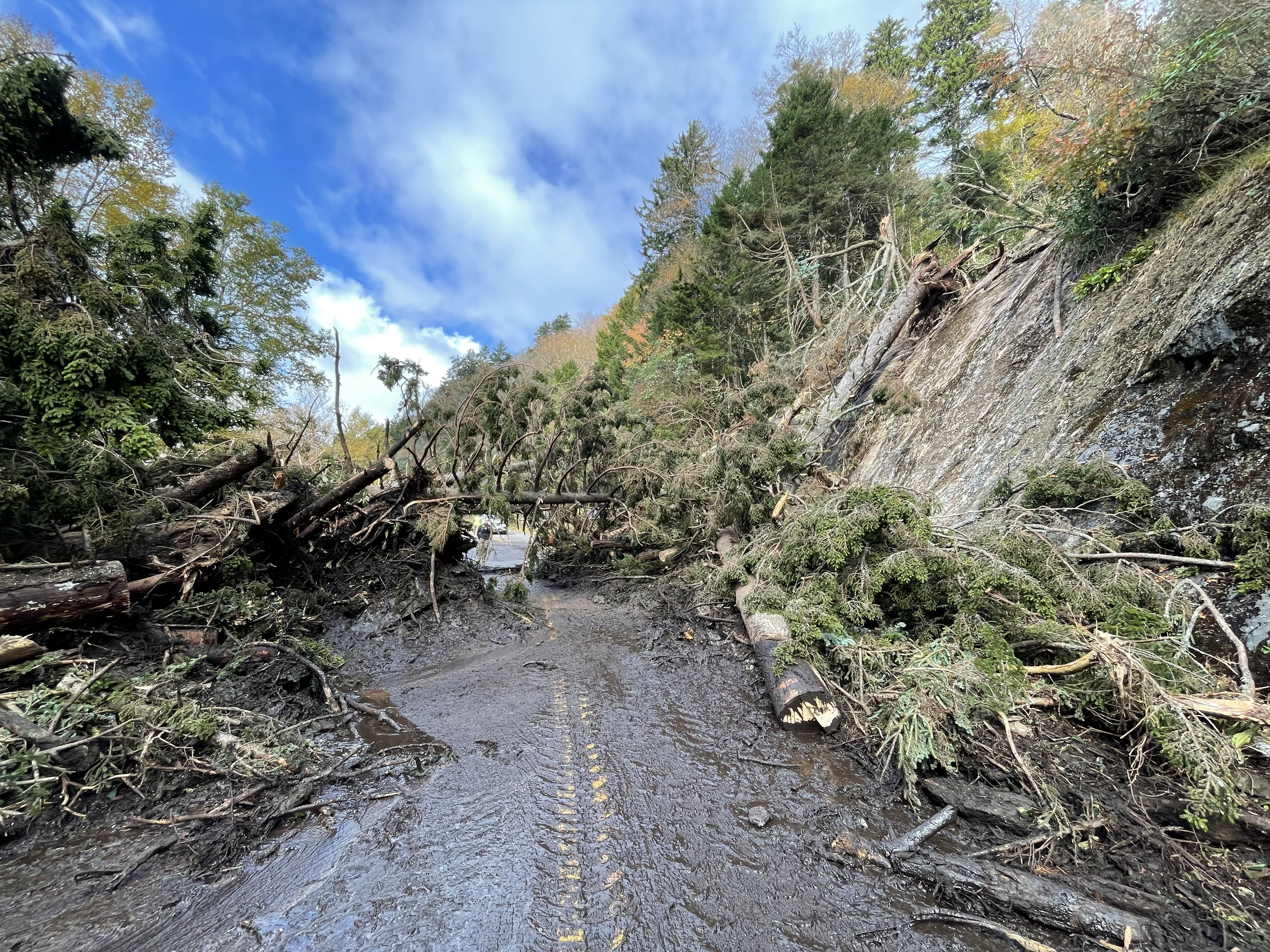
Fallen vegetation on the Blue Ridge Parkway on October 20, 2024, following Hurricane Helene

Construction of the parkway was complete by the end of 1966 with one notable exception. The 7.7-mile (12.4 km) stretch including the Linn Cove Viaduct around Grandfather Mountain did not open until 1987. The project took over 52 years to complete.

Due to serious damage in 2004 from Hurricane Frances, then again by Hurricane Ivan, many areas along the parkway were closed until the spring of 2005, with two areas that were not fully repaired until the spring of 2006.

The parkway was on North Carolina's version of the America the Beautiful quarter in 2015.

The entire length of the parkway was closed in late September 2024 due to damage from Hurricane Helene. Sections began to reopen on October 11, 2024. Portions of the parkway remain closed as of April 2025.

=== Proposed extension ===
An extension of the parkway from its terminus at Beech Gap, North Carolina to a point north of Atlanta, Georgia, was proposed in 1961 by North Carolina Congressman Roy A. Taylor. The route was proposed to pass Whiteside Mountain, Bridal Veil Falls, Cuilasaja Gorge, and Estatoah Falls, ending between Atlanta and Gainesville, Georgia after crossing the Chattahoochee River and passing to the east of Lake Sidney Lanier. By 1963 the National Park Service had proposed a terminus at Interstate 75 north of Marietta, Georgia, in the vicinity of Kennesaw Mountain National Battlefield Park. President Lyndon B. Johnson signed a bill to extend the parkway in 1967. A five-year schedule was proposed, with a budget of $87,536,000 (equivalent to $644 million in 2025). In 1970 planning was interrupted by the projected commercial development of land in the proposed path. Increasing costs associated with rerouting and the passage of time coincided with efforts to cut national debt and concerns about the project's environmental impact, and the project stalled in 1973. The project was formally cancelled on September 11, 1985; no construction work had ever taken place.

== Ecology ==
Flowering shrubs and wildflowers dominate the parkway in the spring, including rhododendrons and dogwoods, moving from valleys to mountains as the cold weather retreats. Smaller annuals and perennials such as the daisy and aster flower through the summer. Brilliant autumn foliage occurs later in September on the mountaintops, descending to the valleys by later in October. Often in early-to-middle October and middle to late April, all three seasons can be seen simply by looking down from the cold and windy parkway to the green and warm valleys below. October is especially dramatic, as the colored leaves stand out boldly and occur mostly at the same time, unlike the flowers.

Major trees include oak, hickory, and tulip tree at lower elevations and buckeye and ash in the middle, turning into conifers such as fir and spruce at the highest elevations on the parkway. Trees near ridges, peaks, and passes (often called gaps or notches) are often distorted and even contorted by the wind, and persistent rime ice is deposited by passing clouds in the winter.

The Blue Ridge Parkway has also been a corridor for the spread of many invasive species, including oriental bittersweet, privet, and multiflora rose.

== Major intersections ==
Commonwealth/State	County	Location	mi	km	Destinations	Notes
Virginia	Augusta	Rockfish Gap	0.00	0.00	US 250 to I-64 – Charlottesville, Waynesboro; Skyline Drive north – Shenandoah National Park	One-quadrant interchange plus connector road; northern terminus of parkway; I-64 exit 99
Virginia	Augusta	Reids Gap	13.7	22.0	SR 664 (Beech Grove Road / Reeds Gap Road) – Waynesboro	
Virginia	Nelson		16.0	25.7	SR 814 (Campbells Mountain Road) to SR 56	Unpaved road
Virginia	Nelson		16.1	25.9	SR 814 (Love Road) – Sherando Lake	
Virginia	Nelson	Tye River Gap	27.1	43.6	SR 56 – Montebello, Steele's Tavern	One-quadrant interchange
Virginia	Rockbridge	Humphreys Gap	45.5	73.2	US 60 – Buena Vista, Amherst	One-quadrant interchange
Virginia	Amherst	Otter Creek	61.3	98.7	SR 130 – Natural Bridge, Lynchburg	One-quadrant interchange
Virginia	Bedford		63.9	102.8	US 501 – Big Island, Glasgow	One-quadrant interchange
Virginia	Bedford	Peaks of Otter	85.9	138.2	SR 43 south – Bedford	North end of SR 43 overlap; north end of VDOT maintenance of SR 43 (southern segment)
Virginia	Botetourt	Powell Gap	89.0	143.2	SR 618 north	
Virginia	Botetourt	Bearwallow Gap	90.9	146.3	SR 43 north – Buchanan	Two-quadrant interchange; south end of SR 43 overlap; south end of VDOT maintenance of SR 43 (northern segment)
Virginia	Botetourt		105.9	170.4	US 460 (US 221) – Bedford, Roanoke	Two-quadrant interchange
Virginia	Roanoke		112.3	180.7	SR 24 – Stewartsville, Vinton, Roanoke, Booker T. Washington National Monument	Two-quadrant interchange
Virginia	Roanoke		115.2	185.4	Blue Ridge Parkway Visitor Center, Virginia's Explore Park (Roanoke River Parkway)	
Virginia	Roanoke		120.5	193.9	Mill Mountain Park & Zoo, Roanoke Star, Downtown Roanoke (Mill Mountain Parkway)	
Virginia	Roanoke		121.4	195.4	US 220 – Rocky Mount, Roanoke	Two-quadrant interchange
Virginia	Roanoke	Adney Gap	136.0	218.9	US 221	Connector road
Virginia	Floyd		159.3	256.4	SR 860 (Shooting Creek Road)	Former SR 109
Virginia	Floyd	Tuggle Gap	165.1	265.7	SR 8 – Floyd, Stuart	One-quadrant interchange
Virginia	Floyd		174.0	280.0	SR 799 (Conner Grove Road)	former SR 102 north
Virginia	Floyd		174.1	280.2	SR 758 (Woodberry Road)	former SR 102 south
Virginia	Floyd		174.2	280.3	SR 758 (Buffalo Mountain Road)	
Virginia	Patrick	Meadows of Dan	177.7	286.0	US 58 (via US 58 Bus.) – Stuart, Hillsville	Parkway and US 58 grade-separated; two-quadrant interchange with US 58 Bus.
Virginia	Patrick–Carroll county line	Willis Gap	192.1	309.2	SR 771 (Willis Gap Road)	
Virginia	Carroll		199.0	320.3	SR 608 (Lightning Ridge Road)	
Virginia	Carroll		199.2	320.6	SR 608 (Ranger Road)	
Virginia	Carroll	Fancy Gap	199.4	320.9	US 52 to I-77 – Mt. Airy, Hillsville	Two-quadrant interchange
Virginia	Grayson	Low Gap	215.7	347.1	SR 89 – Mt. Airy, Galax	One-quadrant interchange
North Carolina	Alleghany		217.2	349.5	NC 18 – Sparta, Mt. Airy	One-quadrant interchange
North Carolina	Alleghany		229.6	369.5	US 21 – Roaring Gap, Sparta	Two-quadrant interchange
North Carolina	Alleghany		248.0	399.1	NC 18 – North Wilkesboro, Laurel Springs	One-quadrant interchange
North Carolina	Ashe	Miller Gap	258.7	416.3	Trading Post Road – Glendale Springs	
North Carolina	Ashe	Horse Gap	261.2	420.4	NC 16 – North Wilkesboro, West Jefferson	Two-quadrant interchange
North Carolina	Watauga	Deep Gap	276.5	445.0	US 421 – Boone, Wilkesboro, North Wilkesboro	One-quadrant interchange
North Carolina	Watauga		280.9	452.1	Old US 421	Connector road
North Carolina	Watauga		290.8	468.0	Green Hill Road	
North Carolina	Watauga		291.9	469.8	US 221 / US 321 – Blowing Rock, Boone	Two-quadrant interchange
North Carolina	Avery		294.6	474.1	US 221 – Linville, Grandfather Mountain	One-quadrant interchange
North Carolina	Avery		312.1	502.3	NC 181 – Pineola, Morganton	One-quadrant interchange
North Carolina	Avery		316.4	509.2	Linville Falls Road – Linville Falls	
North Carolina	Avery		317.5	511.0	US 221 – Linville Falls Community	One-quadrant interchange
North Carolina	Mitchell	Gillespie Gap	330.8	532.4	NC 226 – Spruce Pine, Marion	One-quadrant interchange
North Carolina	Mitchell		333.9	537.4	NC 226A – Little Switzerland	One-quadrant interchange/connector road hybrid
North Carolina	Yancey	Buck Creek Gap	344.1	553.8	NC 80 – Marion, Burnsville	One-quadrant interchange
North Carolina	Yancey	Black Mountain Gap	355.4	572.0	NC 128 – Mount Mitchell State Park	
North Carolina	Buncombe	Bull Gap	375.7	604.6	Elk Mountain Scenic Highway – Weaverville	To Vance Birthplace
North Carolina	Buncombe	Craven Gap	377.4	607.4	NC 694 south (Town Mountain Road)	
North Carolina	Buncombe	Asheville	382.6	615.7	US 70 (Tunnel Road) – Black Mountain, Asheville	Two-quadrant interchange
North Carolina	Buncombe		384.8	619.3	US 74A to I-40 / I-240 – Asheville	Two-quadrant interchange
North Carolina	Buncombe		388.8	625.7	US 25 – Hendersonville, Asheville, NC Arboretum	Two-quadrant interchange
North Carolina	Buncombe		393.6	633.4	NC 191 to I-26 – Asheville, Hendersonville	One-quadrant interchange
North Carolina	Henderson	Elk Pasture Gap	405.6	652.7	NC 151 north – Candler	
North Carolina	Haywood	Wagon Road Gap	411.8	662.7	US 276 – Brevard, Waynesville	One-quadrant interchange
North Carolina	Transylvania	Beech Gap	423.3	681.2	NC 215	One-quadrant interchange
North Carolina	Haywood	Balsam Gap	443.5	713.7	US 74 / US 23 – Waynesville, Sylva	One-quadrant interchange
North Carolina	Haywood	Soco Gap	455.7	733.4	US 19 (Soco Road) – Cherokee, Maggie Valley	Two-quadrant interchange
North Carolina	Jackson	Wolf Laurel Gap	458.2	737.4	Balsam Mountain, Black Camp Gap, Masonic Marker (Heintooga Ridge Road)	
North Carolina	Swain	Ravensford	469.1	754.9	US 441 – Cherokee, Great Smoky Mountains National Park, Gatlinburg	Southern terminus of parkway
1.000 mi = 1.609 km; 1.000 km = 0.621 mi: Concurrency terminus

== Tunnels ==
There are 26 tunnels constructed along the Blue Ridge Parkway. One, the Bluff Mountain Tunnel, is in Virginia and twenty-five are in North Carolina.

The design standards specified a minimum impact on the land. The vehicle tunnels were often constructed to reduce excessive landscape scarring that open cuts would have produced. They are used in areas of steep terrain where ridges run perpendicular to the roadway alignment.

North Carolina's more rugged terrain required the majority of the tunnels. Most of the work on the tunnel digging was done by hand and provided by the Civilian Conservation Corps in the 1930s. Little machinery was used with the intention of creating manual labor in depressed economic times. They did have for tunneling truck-mounted water-cooled compressed air drills called "Jumbos." After the initial holes were drilled into the substrata, dynamite was used for blasting away the rock.

Concrete lining was done during construction due to tunnel cave-ins. This concrete lining was first used in the Devil's Courthouse Tunnel. It was later discovered that it enhanced the interior lighting within the tunnel itself. Where done the lining covered about a quarter of the interior structure. An additional benefit was the elimination of moisture entering the tunnel. Moisture in the winter caused ice problems.

The Pine Mountain Tunnel is the longest on the parkway at 1,434 feet (437 m). Ferrin Knob Tunnel #1 is the first and longest of the triplet tunnels. The local people once referred to ferns as "ferrins." Ferrin Knob Tunnel #2 is located at milepost 401.3 and Ferrin Knob Tunnel #3 is located at milepost 401.5.

The distinctive stone masonry portals now on the parkway tunnels were generally not part of the original construction of the 1930s. They were added later.

The tunnels are listed below by milepost, name, and length. The maximum height is in the center of the tunnel and the minimum height is at the edge stripe.

Milepost	Name of the tunnel	Length	Maximum Height	Minimum Height	Coordinates
53.1	Bluff Mountain Tunnel	630 feet (192 m)	19 feet 1 inch (5.8 m)	13 feet 7 inches (4.1 m)	37.66538°N 79.322866°W
333.4	Little Switzerland Tunnel	542 feet (165 m)	19 feet 8 inches (6.0 m)	14 feet 4 inches (4.4 m)	35.851638°N 82.085917°W
336.4	Wildacres Tunnel	330 feet (101 m)	19 feet 10 inches (6.0 m)	13 feet 1 inch (4.0 m)	35.829603°N 82.117972°W
344.6	Twin Tunnel (North)	300 feet (91 m)	21 feet (6.4 m)	16 feet (4.9 m)	35.763598°N 82.169124°W
344.7	Twin Tunnel (South)	401 feet (122 m)	19 feet 7 inches (6.0 m)	14 feet 7 inches (4.4 m)	35.761875°N 82.170027°W
349.0	Rough Ridge Tunnel	150 feet (46 m)	21 feet 6 inches (6.6 m)	13 feet 9 inches (4.2 m)	35.726871°N 82.207028°W
364.4	Craggy Pinnacle Tunnel	245 feet (75 m)	19 feet 9 inches (6.0 m)	14 feet 1 inch (4.3 m)	35.701204°N 82.376888°W
365.6	Craggy Flats Tunnel	400 feet (122 m)	19 feet 5 inches (5.9 m)	14 feet 1 inch (4.3 m)	35.687289°N 82.383519°W
374.4	Tanbark Ridge Tunnel	780 feet (238 m)	19 feet 5 inches (5.9 m)	14 feet 1 inch (4.3 m)	35.664224°N 82.461434°W
397.1	Grassy Knob Tunnel	770 feet (235 m)	19 feet 2 inches (5.8 m)	13 feet 7 inches (4.1 m)	35.469254°N 82.622304°W
399.3	Pine Mountain Tunnel	1,434 feet (437 m)	19 feet 3 inches (5.9 m)	14 feet 2 inches (4.3 m)	35.449040°N 82.643771°W
400.9	Ferrin Knob Tunnel #1	57 feet (17 m)	19 feet 6 inches (5.9 m)	14 feet 2 inches (4.3 m)	35.456014°N 82.666996°W
401.3	Ferrin Knob Tunnel #2	421 feet (128 m)	19 feet 2 inches (5.8 m)	14 feet (4.3 m)	35.455056°N 82.674271°W
401.5	Ferrin Knob Tunnel #3	375 feet (114 m)	19 feet 5 inches (5.9 m)	13 feet 9 inches (4.2 m)	35.454157°N 82.676163°W
403.0	Young Pisgah Ridge Tunnel	412 feet (126 m)	19 feet 8 inches (6.0 m)	14 feet 6 inches (4.4 m)	35.454444°N 82.700881°W
403.9	Fork Mountain Tunnel	389 feet (119 m)	19 feet 2 inches (5.8 m)	14 feet 6 inches (4.4 m)	35.450169°N 82.715308°W
406.9	Little Pisgah Tunnel	576 feet (176 m)	19 feet 5 inches (5.9 m)	13 feet 10 inches (4.2 m)	35.421636°N 82.742592°W
407.4	Buck Springs Tunnel	462 feet (141 m)	19 feet 2 inches (5.8 m)	13 feet 8 inches (4.2 m)	35.417720°N 82.747806°W
410.1	Frying Pan Tunnel	577 feet (176 m)	19 feet 9 inches (6.0 m)	13 feet 8 inches (4.2 m)	35.390981°N 82.773952°W
422.1	Devil's Courthouse Tunnel	665 feet (203 m)	19 feet (5.8 m)	14 feet 2 inches (4.3 m)	35.305332°N 82.895343°W
439.7	Pinnacle Ridge	813 feet (248 m)	19 feet 1 inch (5.8 m)	13 feet 10 inches (4.2 m)	35.434901°N 83.033833°W
458.8	Lickstone Ridge Tunnel	402 feet (123 m)	13 feet 1 inch (4.0 m)	11 feet 1 inch (3.4 m)	35.507822°N 83.187861°W
459.3	Bunches Bald Tunnel	255 feet (78 m)	13 feet 4 inches (4.1 m)	10 feet 6 inches (3.2 m)	35.514440°N 83.193087°W
461.2	Big Witch Tunnel	348 feet (106 m)	18 feet 1 inch (5.5 m)	11 feet 3 inches (3.4 m)	35.5178885°N 83.2155379°W
465.6	Rattlesnake Mountain Tunnel	395 feet (120 m)	19 feet 6 inches (5.9 m)	14 feet 5 inches (4.4 m)	35.518671°N 83.269625°W
466.3	Sherril Cove Tunnel	550 feet (168 m)	19 feet 7 inches (6.0 m)	14 feet 4 inches (4.4 m)	35.511708°N 83.271575°W

=== Gallery ===
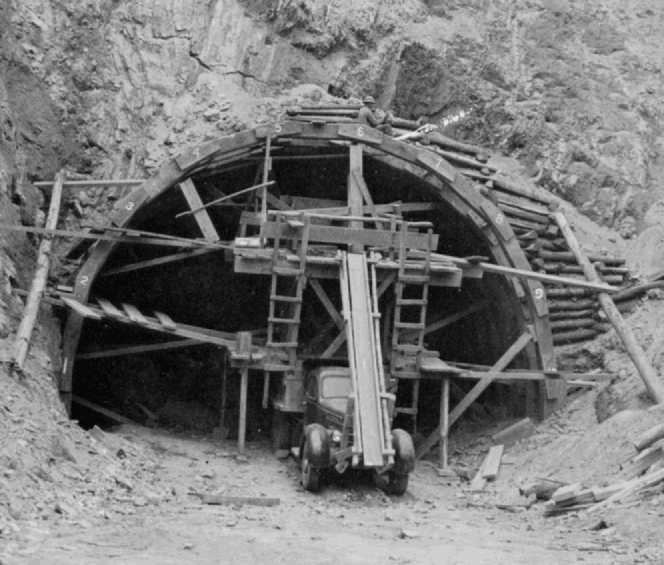
Tunnel construction 1930s

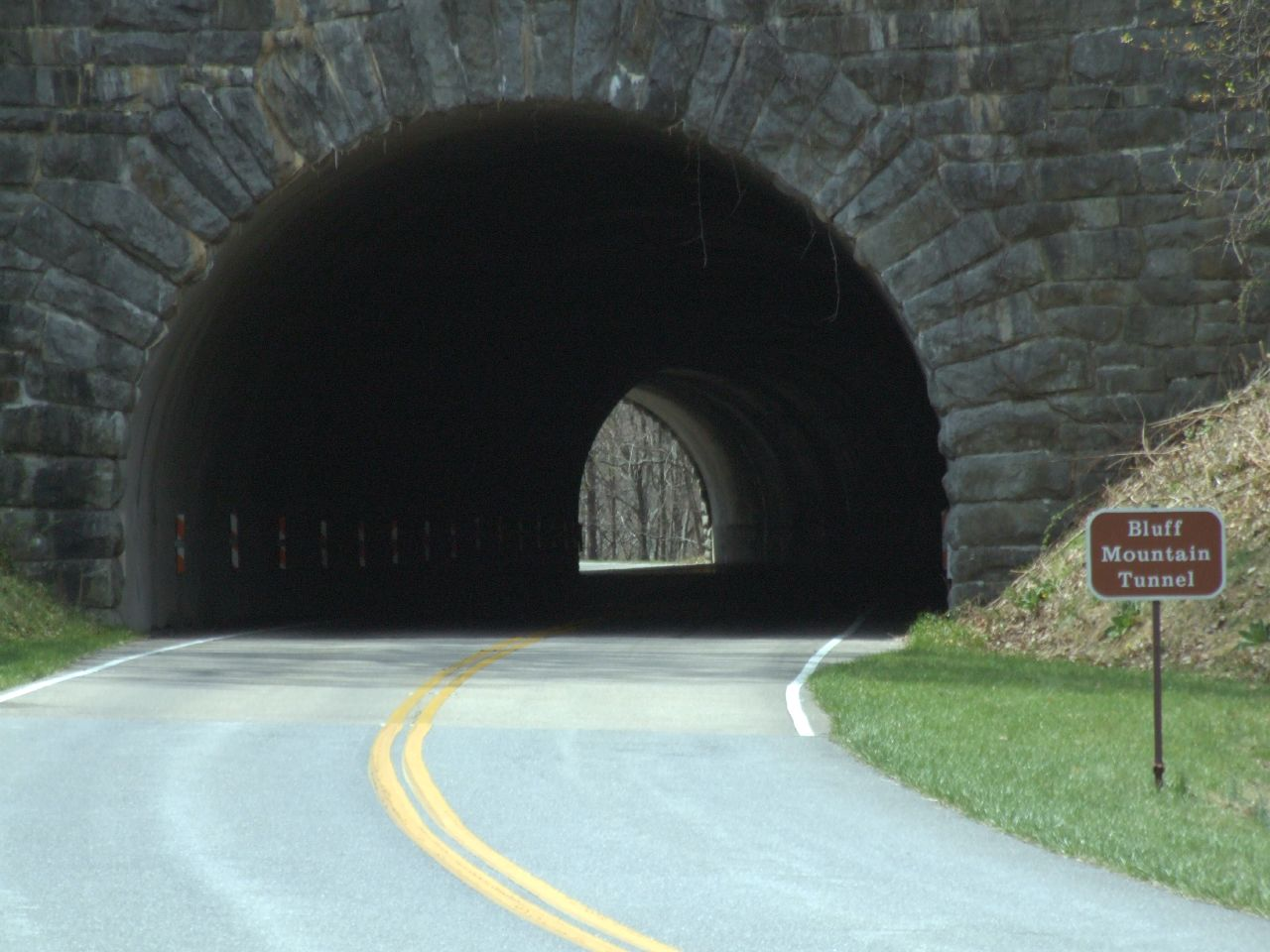
Bluff Mountain Tunnel

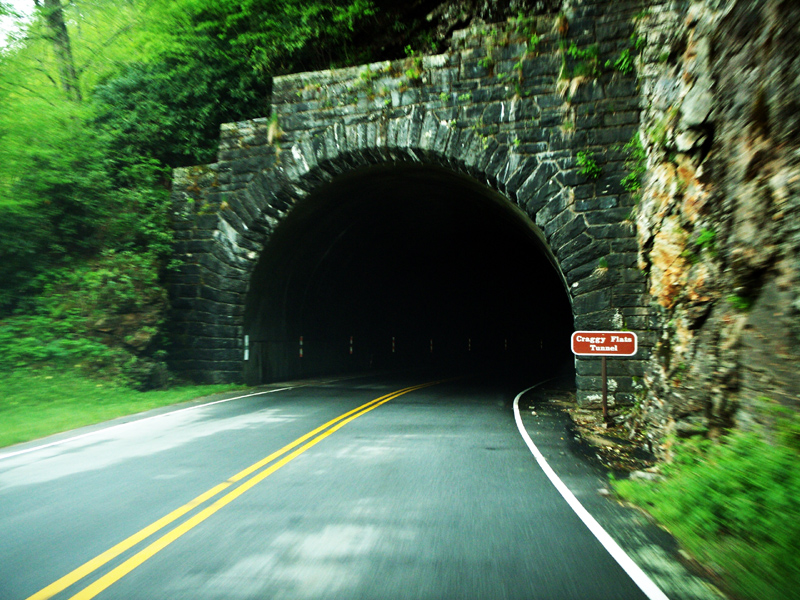
Craggy Flats Tunnel

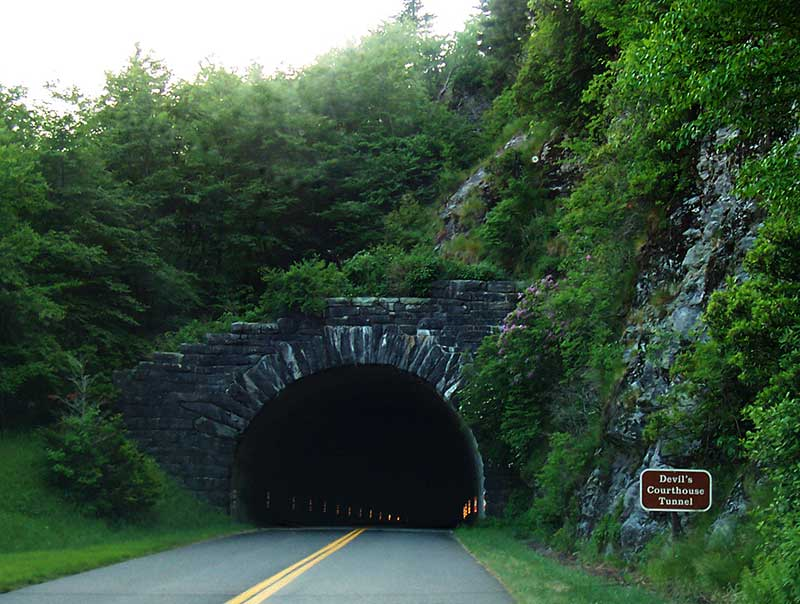
Devil's Courthouse Tunnel

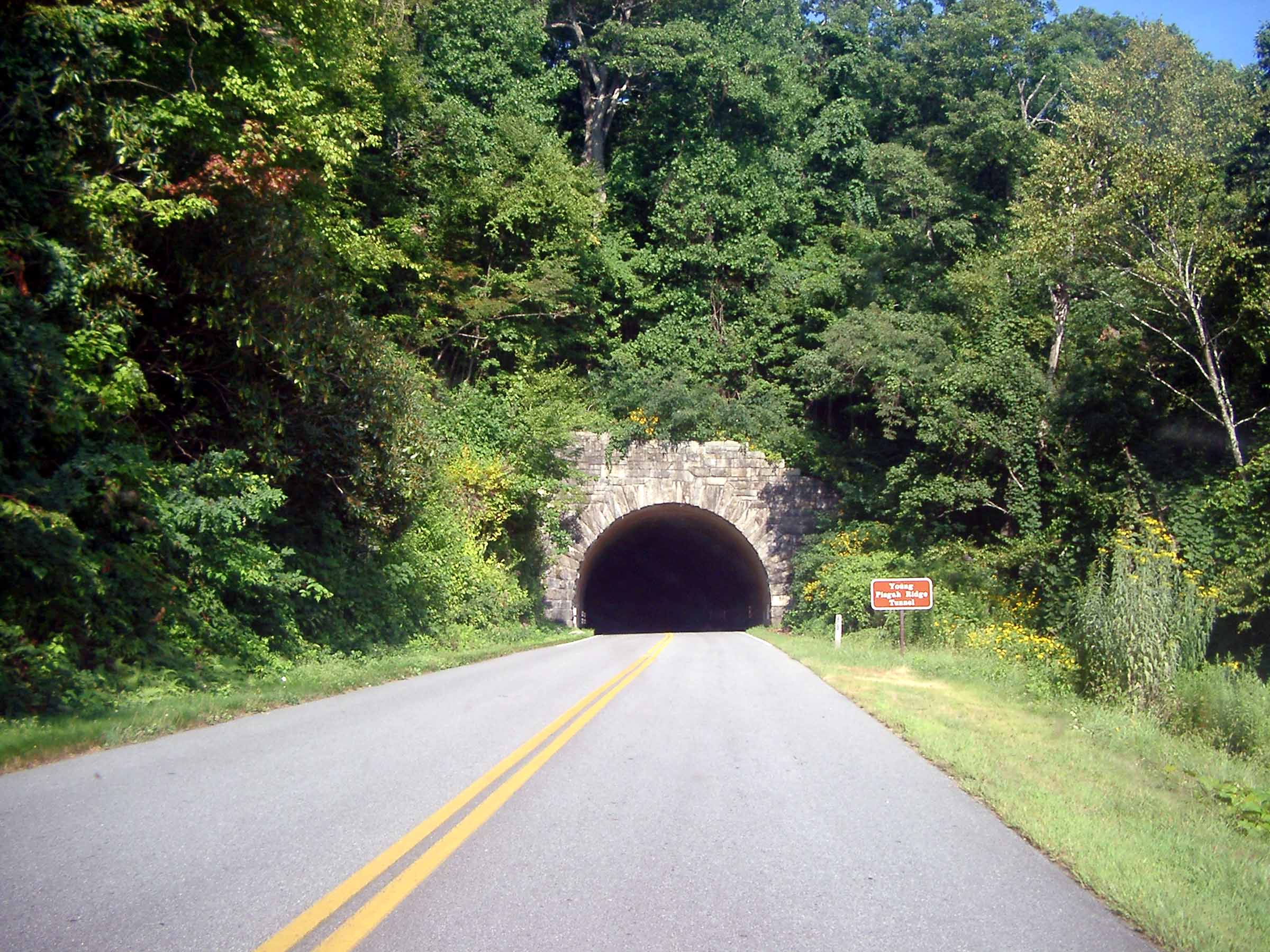
Young Pisgah Ridge Tunnel

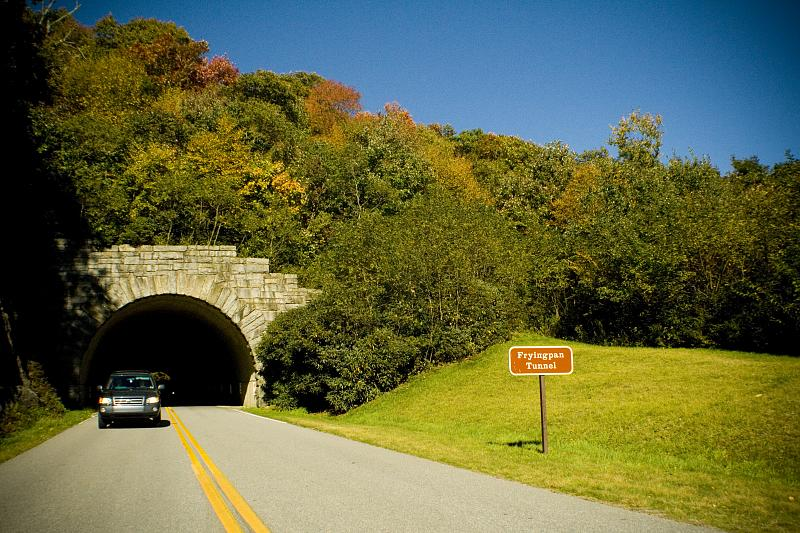
Fryingpan Tunnel

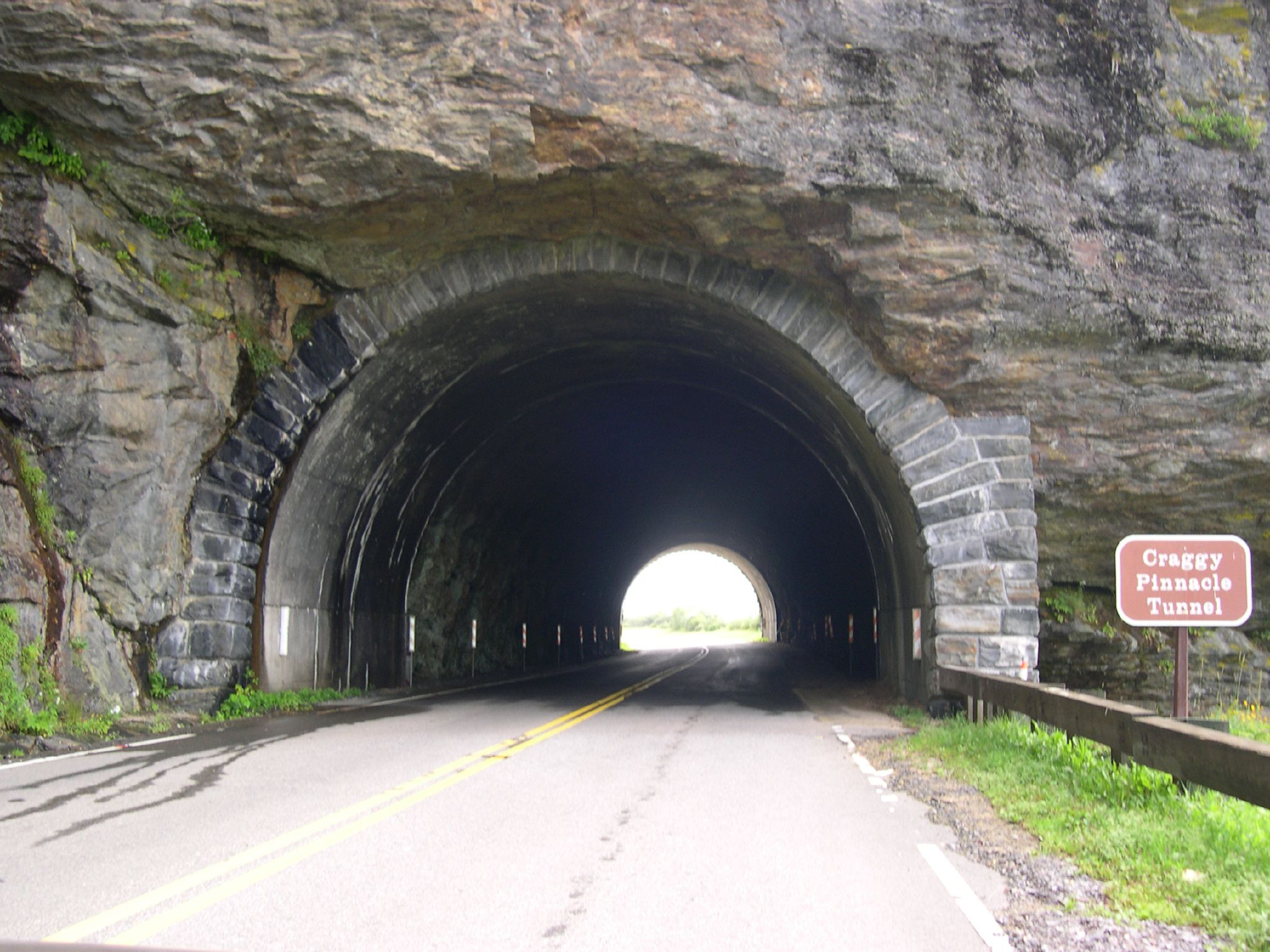
Craggy Pinnacle Tunnel

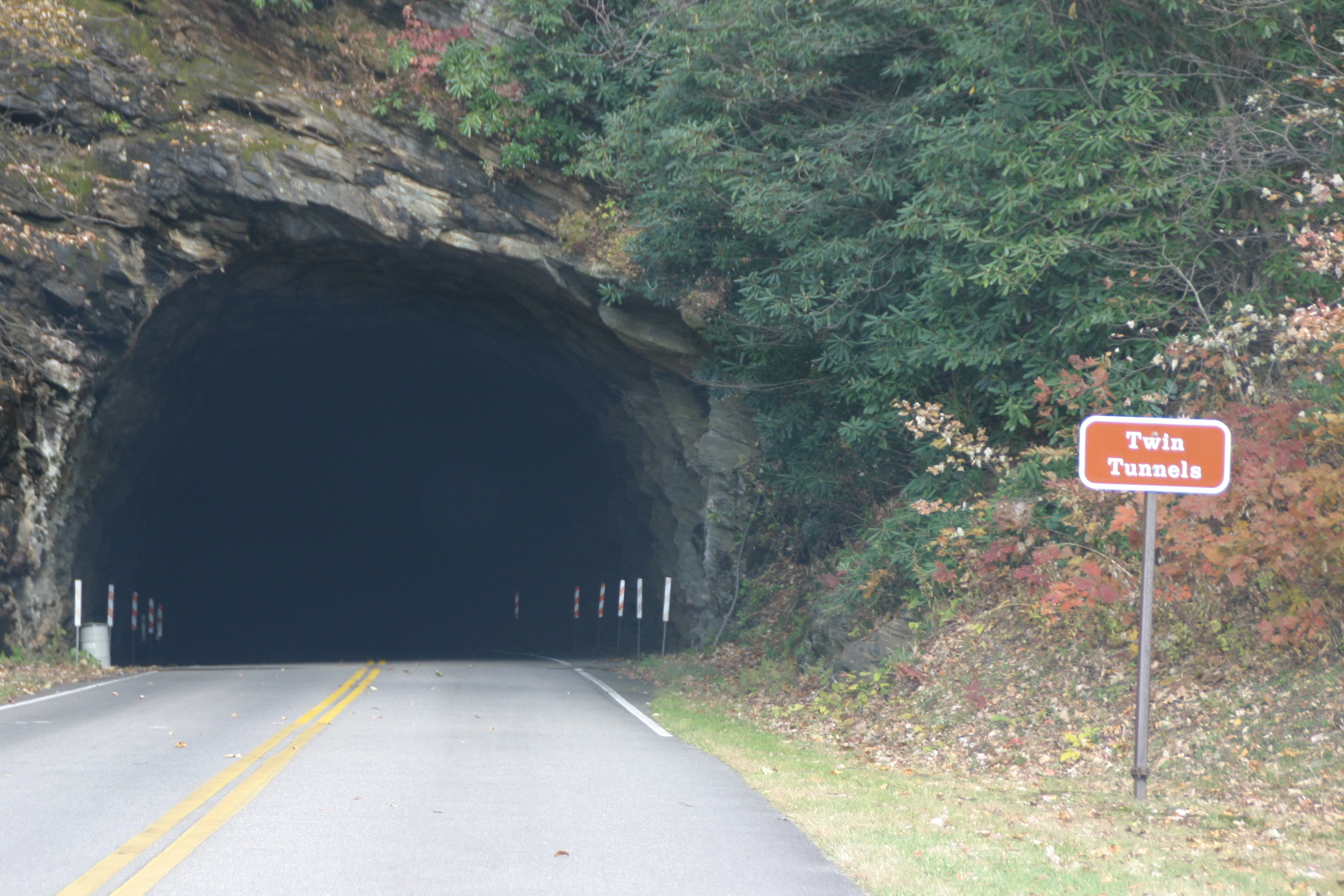
Twin Tunnels

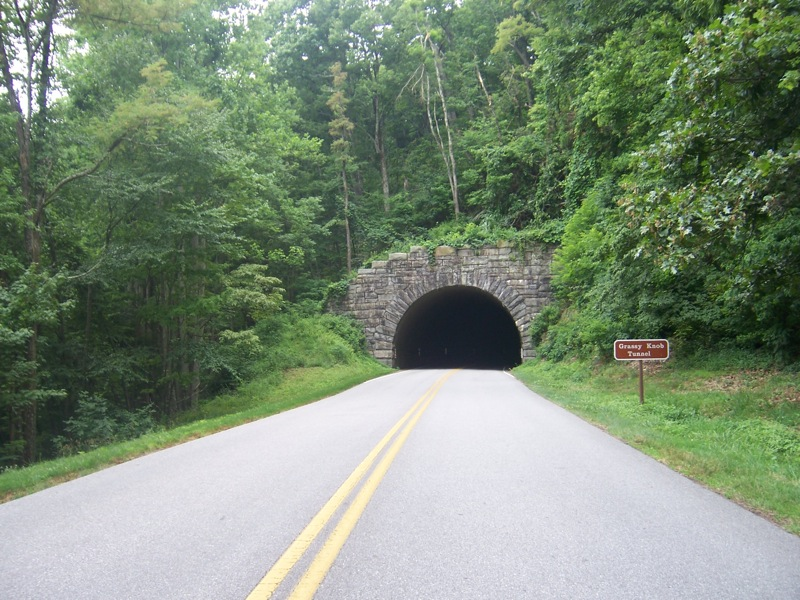
Grassy Knob Tunnel

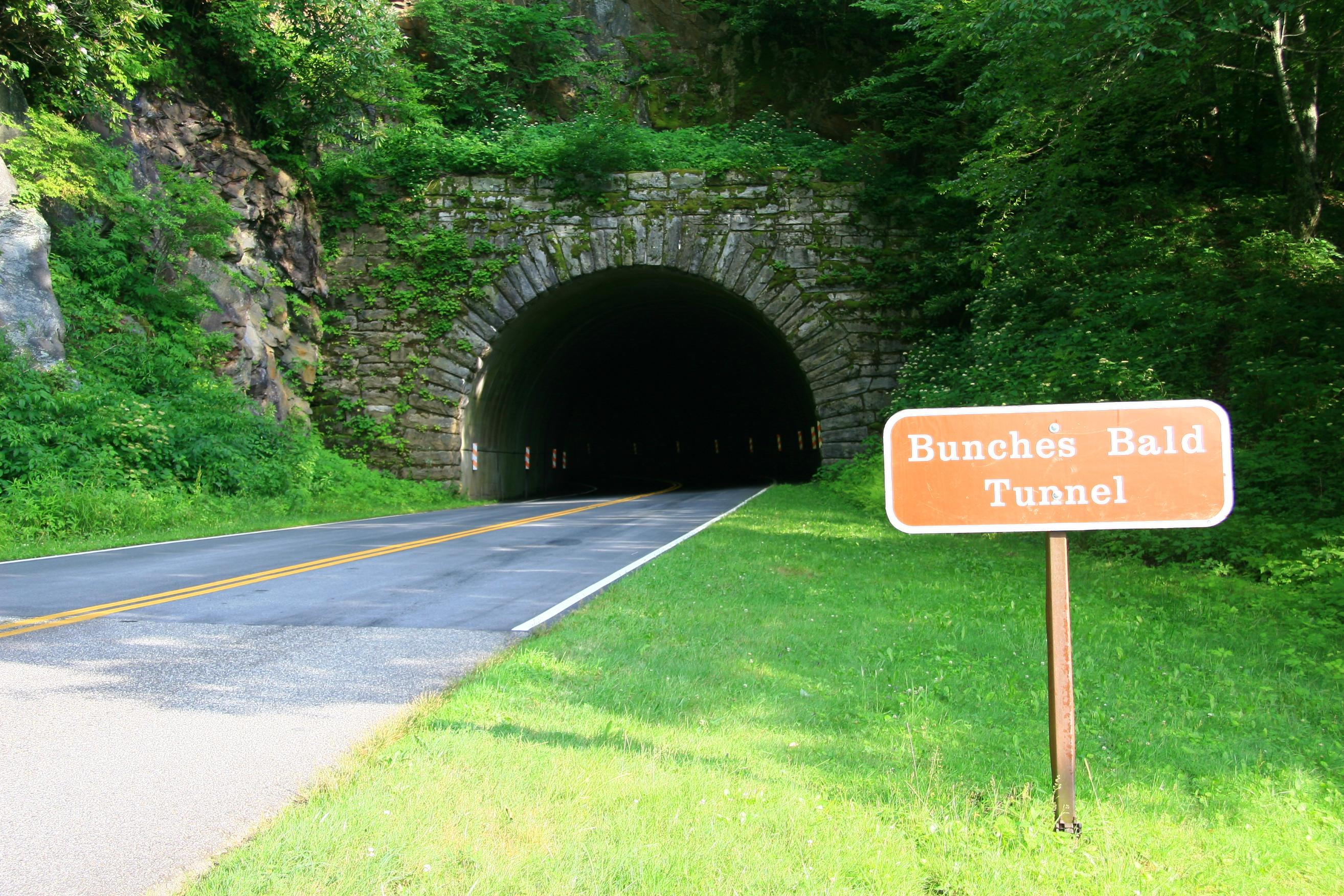
Bunche's Bald Tunnel

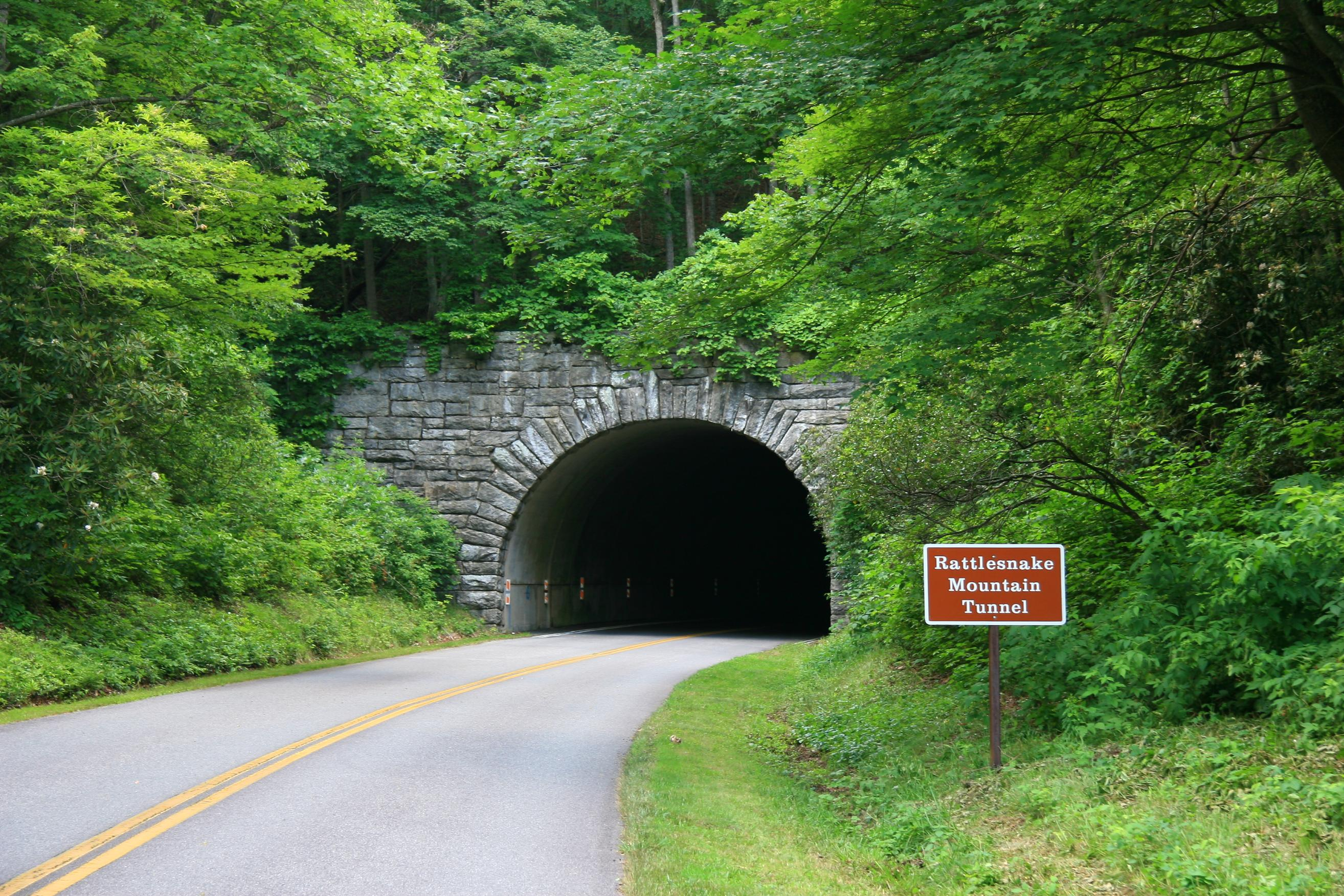
Rattlesnake Mountain Tunnel

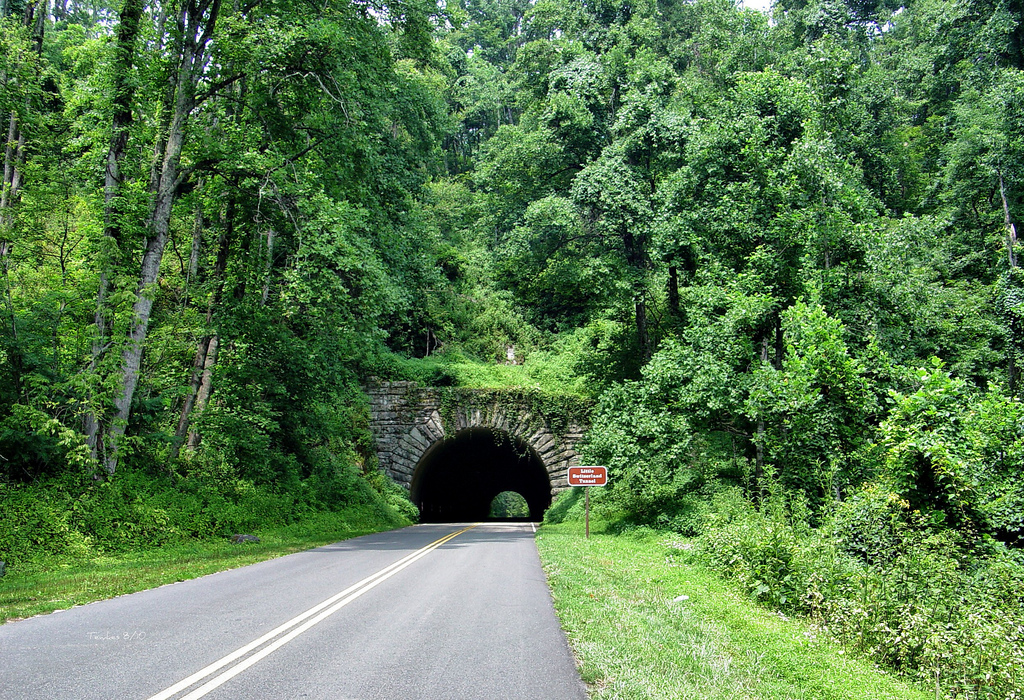
Little Switzerland Tunnel

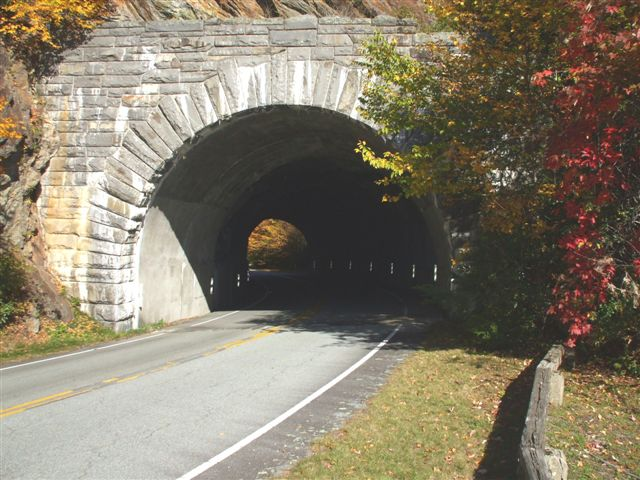
Rough Ridge Tunnel

== See also ==
- Natchez Trace Parkway
- Cherohala Skyway
- Foothills Parkway
