= Ravensford, North Carolina =

Ravensford
- Unincorporated community
- Location within the state of North Carolina
- Coordinates: 35°30′39″N 83°17′44″W
- Country: United States
- State: North Carolina
- County: Swain County
- Elevation: 2,175 ft (663 m)
- Time zone: UTC-5 (Eastern (EST))
  - Summer (DST): UTC-4 (EDT)
- ZIP code: 28719
- Area code: 828
- GNIS feature ID: 1022172

Ravensford is an unincorporated community in Swain County, Western North Carolina. This is within the traditional homeland of the Cherokee people. In a survey and excavation project in the early 21st century, part of the community was found to have archeological resources that were thousands of years old, in addition to more recent historic materials related to the Cherokee people. In 1938, the US Government and state of North Carolina negotiated with the Eastern Band of Cherokee Indians to gain their agreement to transfer some of their land to enable construction of the Blue Ridge Parkway. In return, lands in Ravensford were transferred to their Qualla Boundary property.

Ravensord was established as a company town by European Americans sometime between 1900–1910, on the banks of Raven Fork, a tributary of the Oconaluftee River. The lumber mill owned and operated everything, from housing to the school/church building, for workers who numbered 200-1000 people. In 1933, Ravensford Lumber Company sold the town and area to the National Park Service for over $33 an acre. In 1934, it was made part of the Great Smoky Mountains National Park.

In 1938, the U.S. Government, the State of North Carolina, and the federally recognized Eastern Band of Cherokee Indians made a compromise that transferred land at Ravensford into the latter's Qualla Boundary in exchange for land ceded to the US for the Blue Ridge Parkway. As part of the compensation, North Carolina constructed a new highway (US 19) through Soco Gap and Qualla Boundary. Ravensford became the southern terminus of the Blue Ridge Parkway in the Oconaluftee area of the Great Smoky Mountains National Park.

In the 21st century, the EBCI was planning for construction of a new high school to serve their people. The site was in Ravensford, and an environmental assessment was performed (including a document and archeological survey) to determine if the project would affect any historic resources. It developed as one of North Carolina’s largest and most intensive archaeological projects, as a tremendous number of artifacts and resources were found.

Discoveries at Ravensford include "114 structures, thousands of features, maybe 500,000 artifacts", including pots from 1450 and 1600 CE. There was evidence that Cherokee ancestors and other indigenous groups may have been living here since 8000 BCE.

Cherokee High School, built in 2010, is within the Ravensord area of Qualla Boundary. There are also a few homes dotted along Big Cove Road.
