= Humpback Rock =

Mountain in Virginia, US

Humpback Rocks
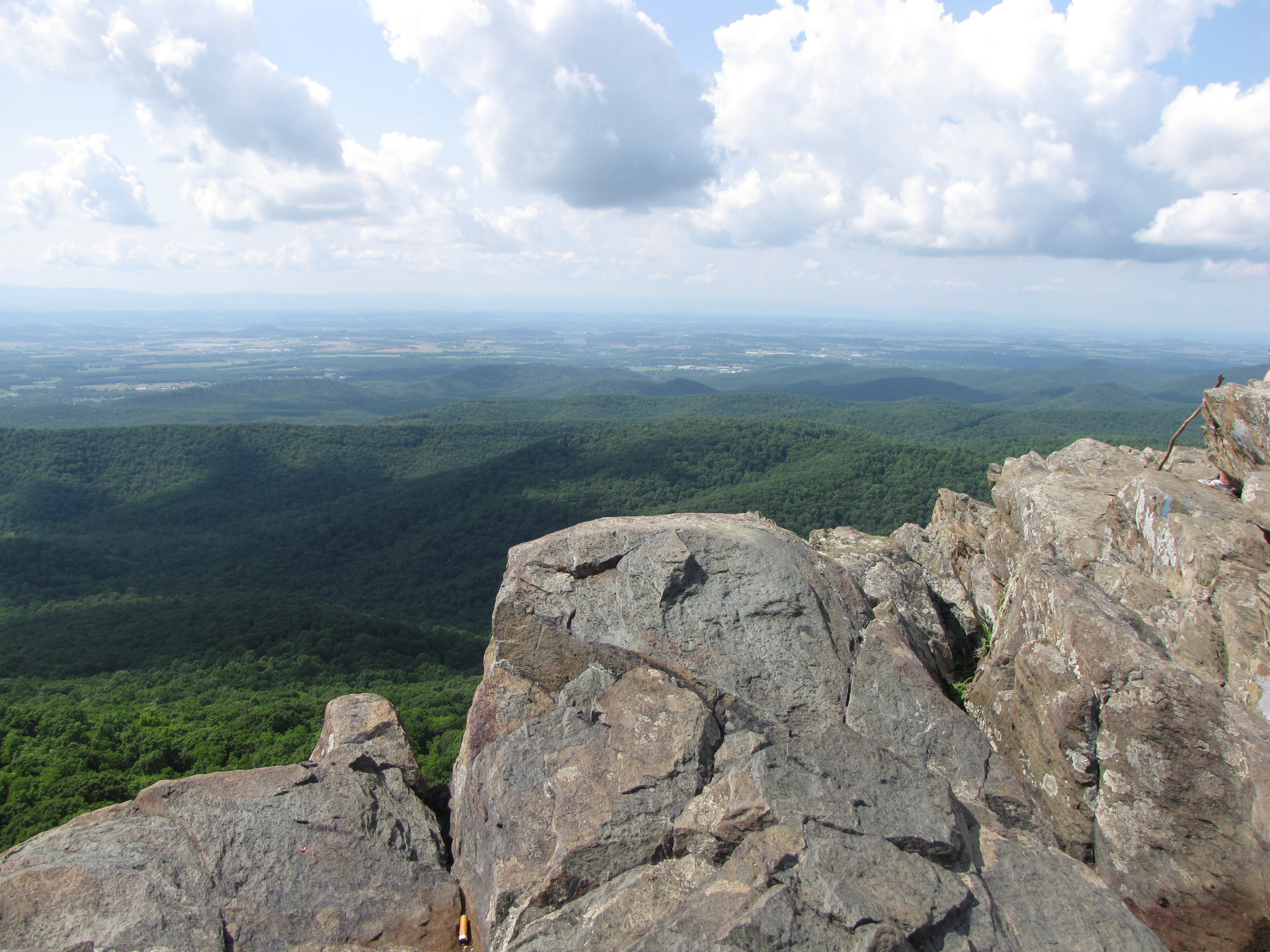
- View of the Shenandoah Valley from Humpback Rock in the Blue Ridge Mountains.

Highest point
- Elevation: 3,080 ft (940 m)
- Coordinates: 37°57′39″N 78°54′01″W

Geography
- Location: Augusta / Nelson counties, Virginia, U.S.
- Parent range: Blue Ridge Mountains
- Topo map: USGS Sherando

Geology
- Rock age: Precambrian
- Mountain type: Granite

Climbing
- Easiest route: Hike

Humpback Rocks is a massive greenstone outcropping near the peak of Humpback Mountain in the Blue Ridge Mountains of Augusta County and Nelson County, Virginia, United States, with a summit elevation of 3,080 feet (940 m). The rock formation is so named for the visual effect of a "hump" it creates on the western face of the mountain.

Located six miles (10 km) south of the northern entrance to the Blue Ridge Parkway near Waynesboro, Virginia, Humpback Rocks stands out from many other mountain summits in the Blue Ridge due to its exposed rocky summit, in contrast to the heavily vegetated peaks of surrounding mountains. The location features a well-maintained trail and visitor center.

== Geology ==
As is the case for most of the surrounding mountains, such as Old Rag Mountain, Humpback Rock is underlain by an enormous granite formation created during the Grenville Orogeny on the ocean floor about a billion years ago. About 400 million years later, during the Catoctin Formation, basaltic magma was deposited, forming a layer of greenstone over the granite. Over time, sand and rock sedimented on the ocean floor, forming quartzite and sandstone deposits. Finally, sedimentation of shells and skeletons of foraminifera resulted in deposition of a layer of limestone. Approximately 700 million years after the Grenville Orogeny, the Iapetus Ocean began to close, resulting in the Alleghenian Orogeny, where slabs of granite and rock were transported westward and eventually thrust up over the limestone bed around it, forming Humpback Rock and the Blue Ridge Mountains.

== Humpback Gap Overlook ==
From 1851 until the early 20th century, wagoners hauling cargo used the bygone road Howardsville Turnpike to go between Howardsville and the Shenandoah Valley. Often the travelers camped at Humpback Gap. Nearby are the 795 acres (3.22 km^{2}) of Humpback Rocks Recreation Area. Notable is the rock fence, reputedly built by slaves of a plantation owner, that separates the gap and Greenstone Overlook. Just beyond, at milepost 5.8, are the Humpback Rocks.

The early European settlers of the Appalachian Mountains forged a living from the native materials so abundant around them. Hickory, chestnut and oak trees provided nuts for food, logs for building and tannin for curing hides, while the rocks were put to use as foundations and chimneys for the houses and in stone fences to control wandering livestock. Many self-sufficient farms sprang up in the Humpback Mountain area.

Today, visitors can tour a collection of 19th-century farm buildings. The Mountain Farm trail provides access to the cabin and various outbuildings. The area also houses a visitor center with new exhibits, a picnic area, and trails.

== Hiking ==
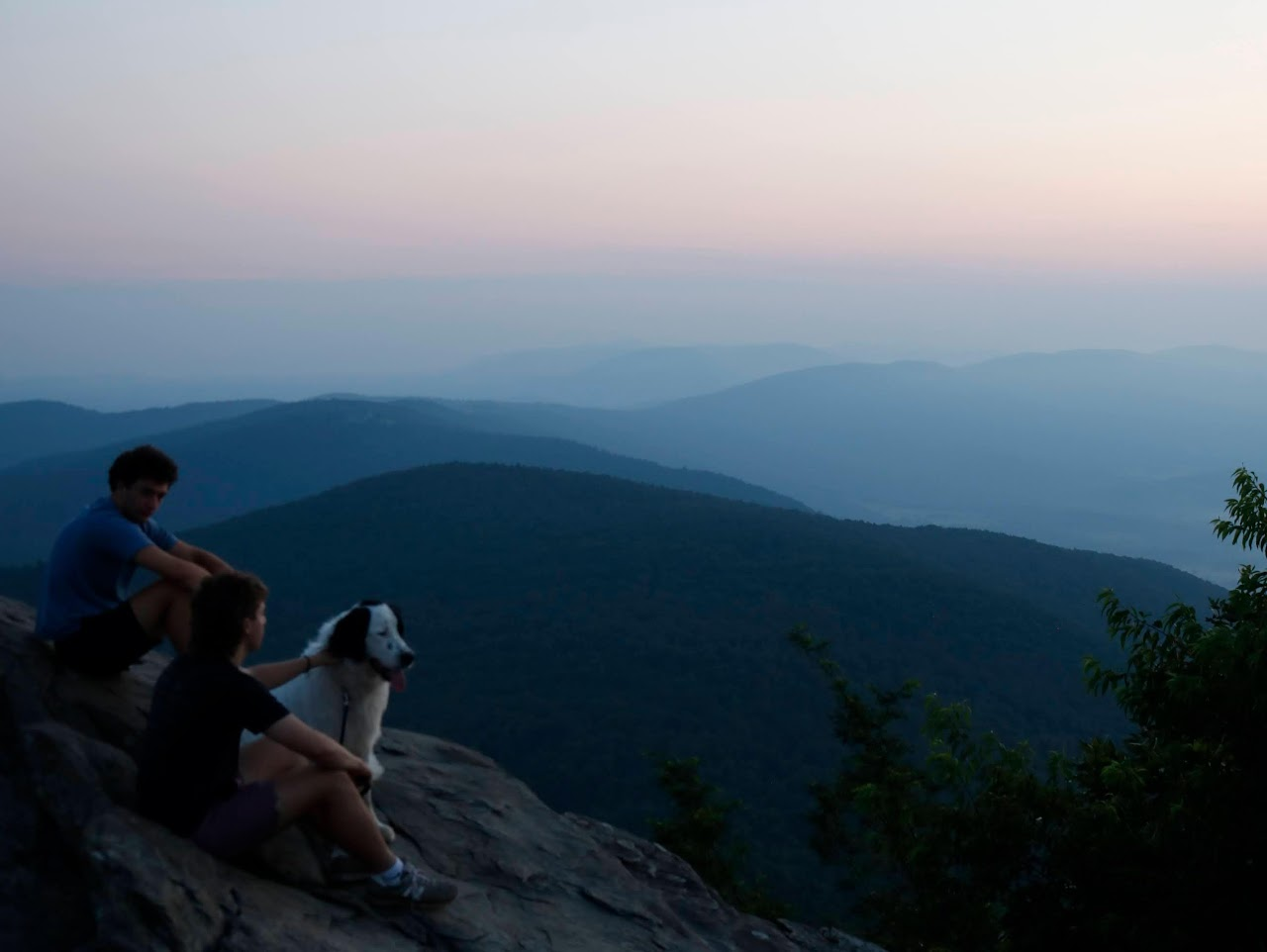
Harrison Sugerman, Tyler Heron, and Lluvia at Sunrise

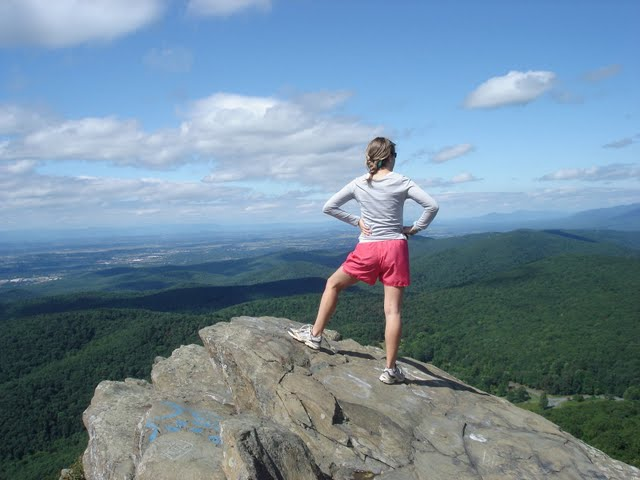
A hiker stands atop the precipice of Humpback Rocks

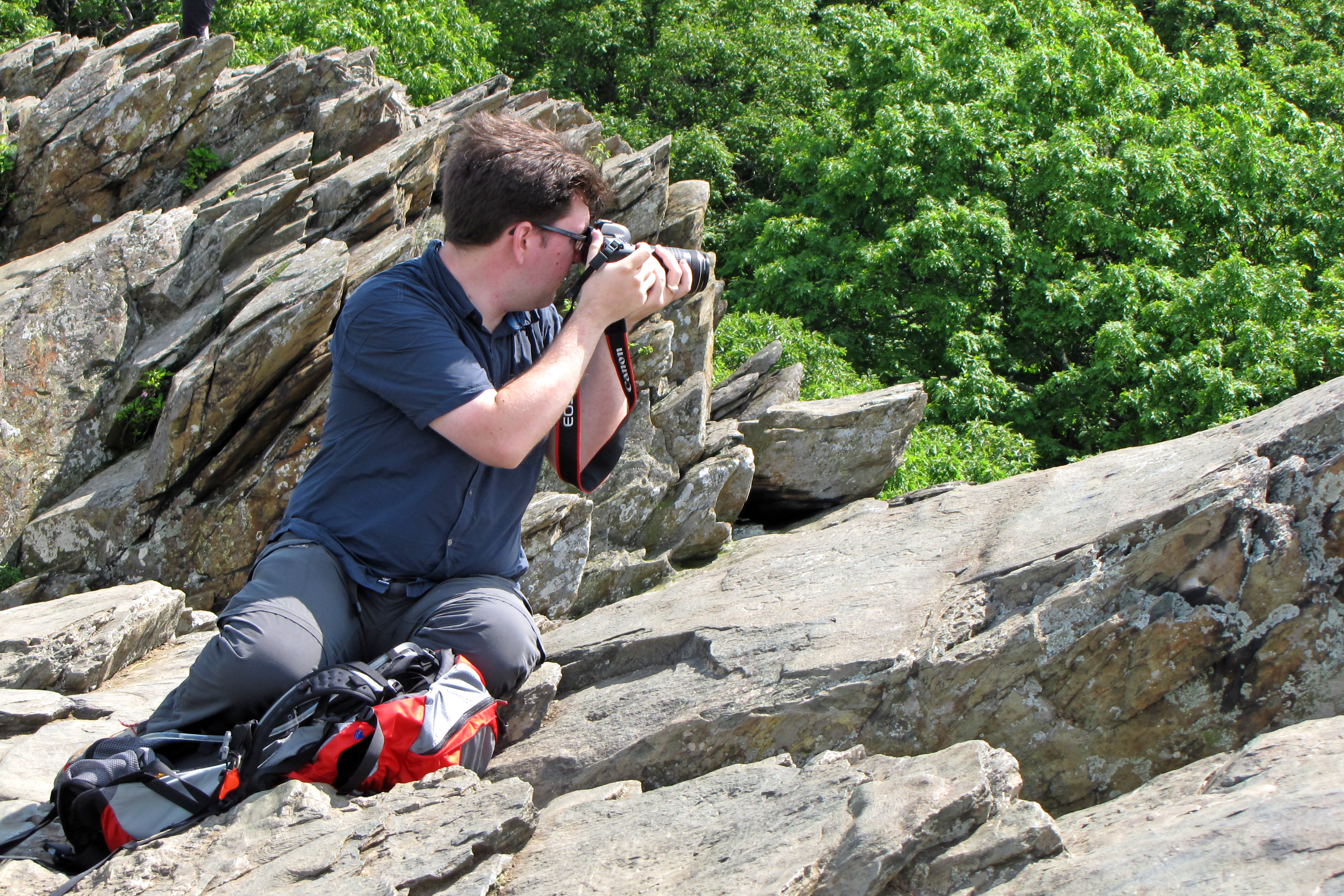
A man takes a photograph from Humpback Rock, in the Blue Ridge Mountains of Virginia.

=== Overview ===
Hiking Humpback Rocks is a relatively short hike following a 2.0-mile (3.2 km) trail loop. With a roughly 45 minute hike to ascend 740 feet (230 m) to the peak, and a 20–25 minute descent, the trail ranks as one of the shorter hikes along the Blue Ridge. The peak affords a spectacular 360-degree view of the surrounding terrain. To the north you can see into the southern section of Shenandoah National Park, to the east a patchwork of farms, to the southwest thick woods and mountain ridges of the George Washington National Forest.

Hikers may continue to follow the trail for .5 miles (0.80 km), passing along the top of a cliff with views to the south and east before descending 1.2 miles (1.9 km) to a blue blaze trail. This trail leads .3 miles (0.48 km) into the Humpback Rocks Picnic Area. The distance between Humpback Gap and the Humpback Rocks Picnic Area is 3.6 miles (5.8 km). A map of the hike and of the Humpback Gap Overlook is available through the Blue Ridge Parkway website. Continuing past Humpback Rocks itself, the summit of Humpback Mountain is only a few minutes further. The Appalachian Trail passes a short distance to the north, at milepost 6.

=== Directions ===
The Humpback Rocks Visitors Center is located at mile marker 5.8, six miles south of the Rockfish Gap Interchange of I-64 and US 250. It is most easily accessed by either one of these two highways. Head south on the Blue Ridge Parkway for 5.8 miles (9.3 km) to reach the Humpback Rocks Visitors Center, or continue another 0.2 miles (0.32 km) to arrive at the Humpback Gap parking area on the left.

A map of the Blue Ridge Parkway including Humpback Rocks can be found at the Texas Library webpage.

=== Camping ===
Camping is available nearby in the Sherando Lake Recreation Area in the George Washington National Forest off the Blue Ridge Parkway a few miles south. Coming from the north on the Appalachian Trail there is an AT shelter called the Paul C. Wolfe shelter.

=== Appalachian Trail ===
The Appalachian Trail can also be accessed from the Humpback Gap parking area. Southbound hikers can reach it by continuing south on the Humpback Rocks trail. Northbound hikers can reach it taking the one-mile (1.6-km) blue blazed path at the northern end of the parking lot, or the one-mile (1.6-km) white blazed path just off of the Howardsville Turnpike.
