= Mill Mountain Zoo =

- Interactive map of Mill Mountain Zoo
- 37°14′55.97″N 79°56′10.56″W
- Date opened: July 4, 1952
- Location: Roanoke, Virginia, United States
- No. of animals: 85 (3 endangered species)
- No. of species: 35
- Director: Niki Voudren
- Website: mmzoo.org

Mill Mountain Zoo is a non-profit zoo located atop Mill Mountain in Roanoke, Virginia, dedicated to fostering connections between people and wildlife to promote conservation and environmental stewardship. The zoo emphasizes educational programs, conservation initiatives, and interactive animal experiences to encourage appreciation for biodiversity.

Highlighting species native to the Appalachian and Blue Ridge Mountains, such as red wolves, bald eagles, and black bears, the zoo celebrates regional ecosystems while supporting global conservation efforts for animals like snow leopards and red pandas. As a non-profit, all donations and purchases directly support the zoo's mission to preserve wildlife and ecosystems for future generations.

== History ==
The zoo opened as the Children’s Zoo in 1952. Originally operating with a fairy tale and nursery rhyme theme, the zoo had various structures and attractions that paid homage to popular children’s stories, including the schoolhouse from "Mary Had a Little Lamb", the houses from the "Three Little Pigs", and the shoe from "There Was an Old Woman Who Lived in a Shoe", which stood at the entrance to the zoo. In its early years, most of the animals on exhibit were native to the area, with a notable exception being a group of prairie dogs that were brought from Texas.

With its location atop Mill Mountain not being conducive to a major expansion, a proposal was developed in 1984 to relocate the zoo to a 400-acre (160 ha) tract adjacent to the Blue Ridge Parkway to be called the Blue Ridge Zoo. This proposal was later abandoned in favor of the development of Virginia's Explore Park at that location. After the failed relocation proposal, the newly-established Blue Ridge Zoological Society voted in 1988 to keep the zoo permanently atop Mill Mountain. As part of this decision, a 10-year master plan, called Zoo 2001, was completed in 1991, with some of its suggestions implemented over the course of the next decade.

The zoo was accredited by the Association of Zoos and Aquariums (AZA) from 1995 to 2016. Due to the zoo's financial situation at the time, the AZA declined to renew its accreditation, but the organization upheld that the zoo continued to excel in its general operation and animal welfare. Since 2019, Mill Mountain Zoo has retained accreditation through the Zoological Association of America (ZAA).

In June 2021, the zoo completed its largest capital project in three decades and added a black bear, heritage goats, hogs, and other animals.

=== Recent Additions ===
- Interactive aviary — added in 2008
- Reptile house — added in 2009
- Red wolf exhibit — added in 2020
- American black bear exhibit — added in 2021
- Patagonian mara exhibit - added in 2026
- New holding/quarantine building (houses new animals and the birds during the winter) – not accessible to the public
- New animal clinic – not accessible to the public

== Attractions and notable animals ==
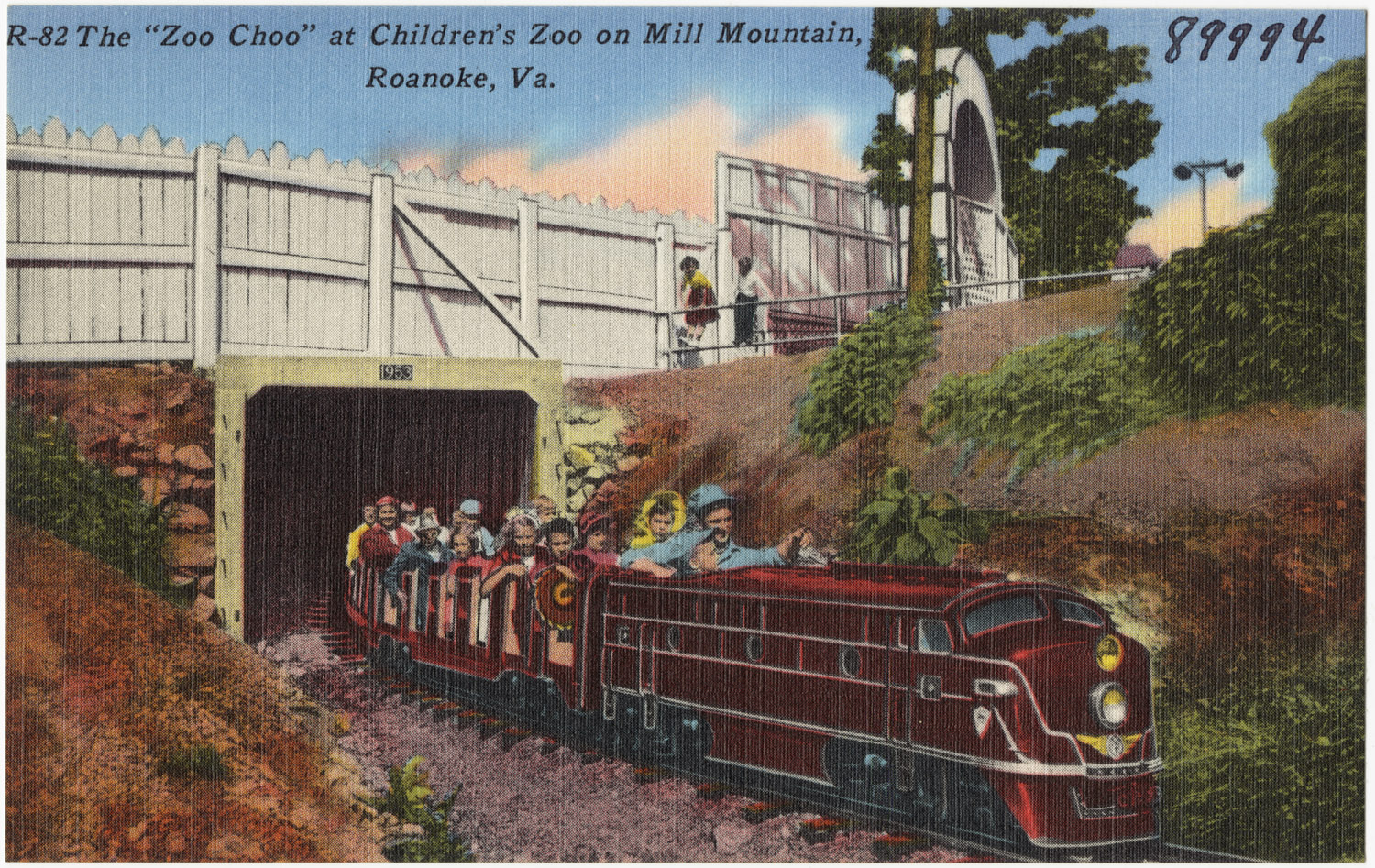
Postcard of Zoo Choo at Mill Mountain Zoo

The zoo is host to 85 animals among 35 species, including one critically endangered species, the red wolf, and three on the endangered list, the red panda, wood turtle, and the golden poison dart frog.

Red Wolves are protected under SAFE (Saving Animals From Extinction). This program supports conservation efforts for this species by maintaining a healthy and viable population of red wolves under human care, growing education and awareness efforts, and aiding in research vital to supporting recovery and management. Captive red wolves are located throughout the country at different SAFE facilities, but they are managed as a single population. Transfers between facilities for breeding to accommodate genetics management objectives to help maintain a healthy and diverse population.

- Zoo Choo began operating when the zoo opened in 1952. It originally consisted of a gas-powered Model G-16 miniature train engine, two passenger cars and an observation car. The train operated continuously except between 1994 and 1996 and in 2002. In 2007, it was relocated to the Virginia Museum of Transportation. The zoo replaced it with another G-16 miniature train engine in August 2008.

The following are some of the more notable animals and attractions that have been at the zoo:

- Frump Frump was an African elephant donated to the zoo from a passing circus in 1970. Although she would die just a few months after being placed in the zoo, a record 107,000 visitors came, with many making the trip specifically to see her.
- Ruby was a Siberian tiger. She was donated to the zoo by law enforcement officers who found her being kept illegally as a pet in Danville, Virginia. Ruby was at the zoo from November 1988 until her death on December 10, 2006. Her habitat has since been converted to a wolf habitat.
- Oops is a Japanese macaque who escaped her cage in July 2006. Her escape was covered nationwide before she was recaptured a week later. She has since been moved to a larger facility to live with a larger group.

Current animals:

- Hoofstock Yard (myotonic goats, pot-bellied pig, American Guinea Hog)
- American black bear
- Patagonian mara
- Red panda
- Red wolves
- Northern lynx
- Asian small-clawed otters
- Red fox
- Sulcata tortoise
- Burmese python
- Red tailed boa
- Sandhill crane
- Red-billed blue magpie
- Military macaw
- Indian crested porcupine
- Raccoon
- Pallas's cats
- Bald eagle
- North American porcupines
- Two-toed sloth
- Various poison dart frogs
- Various other birds and reptiles

Past animals:

- Corsac foxes (3 of only 5 in the US at the time)
- White-naped crane
- Parma wallabies
- African elephant
- Siberian tiger
- Snow leopard
- Bennett's wallabies
- Canadian lynx
- Red kangaroo
- Red tailed hawk
- Golden pheasant
- American alligator
- Sichuan takin
- Wolverine
- Japanese macaque
- Great horned owl
- Cavy
- Cougar
- Fishing cat
- Black-footed marmosets
- Prairie dogs
- Miniature zebu
- Eastern screech owl
- Two-toed sloth
