= Soco Gap =

Mountain pass in North Carolina, United States

- ᎠᎭᎷᏄn'Ᏹ; Ahalunun'yi, meaning "Ambush Place"
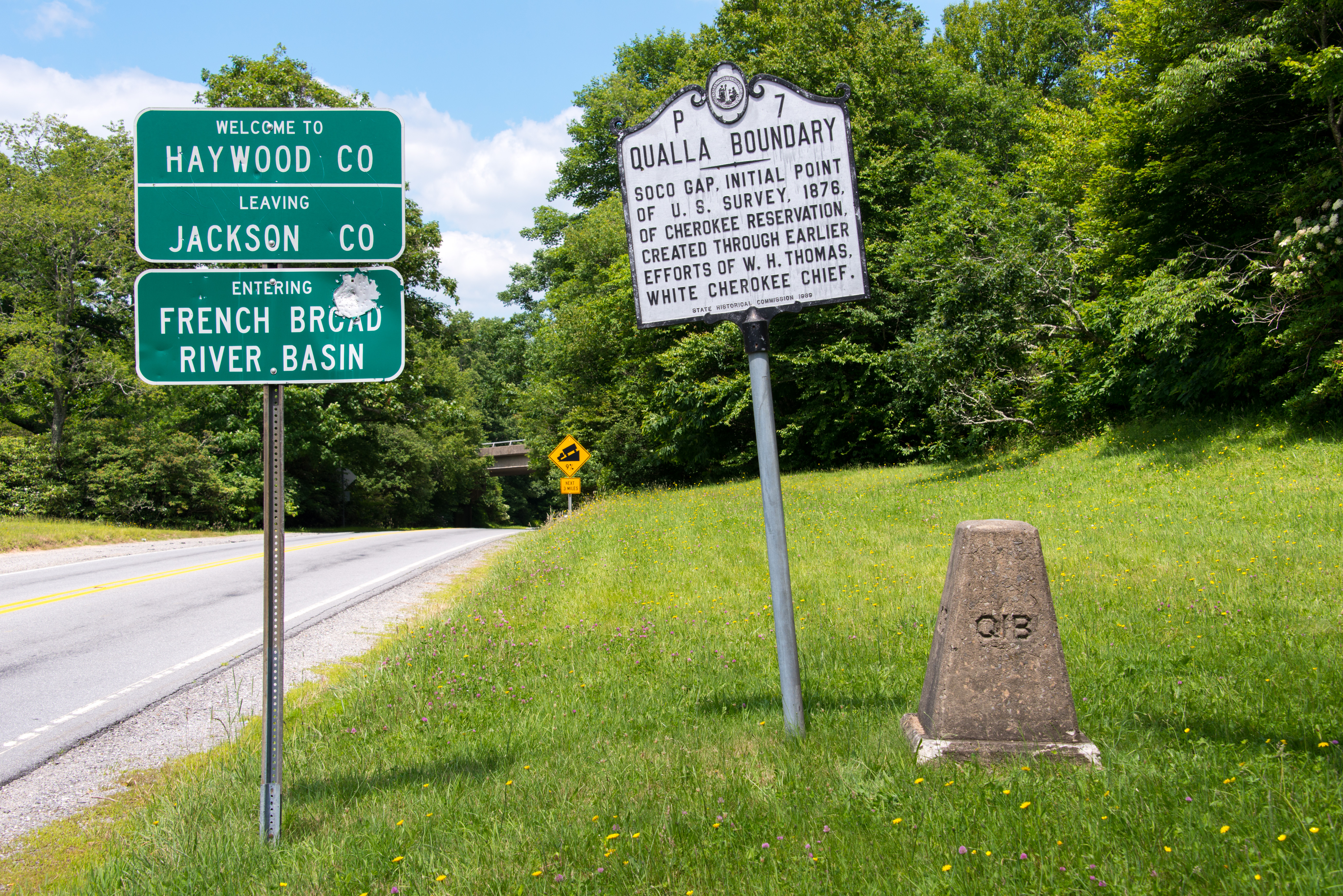
- Various boundaries marked at Soco Gap

- Location within North Carolina
- Elevation: 4,340 feet (1,320 m)
- Traversed by: US 19 / Blue Ridge Pkwy

Third Approach
- Location: North Carolina; United States
- Range: Great Balsam Mountains
- Coordinates: 35°29′43″N 83°09′23″W
- Topo map: USGS Sylva North

Soco Gap (el. 4,340 ft (1,320 m)) is a mountain pass between the Plott Balsams to the south and the Great Balsam Mountains to the north. The gap is the eastern point of the Qualla Boundary, which marks the territory held as a land trust for the federally recognized Eastern Band of Cherokee Indians. The gap separates Haywood and Jackson counties and separates the river basins to the French Broad River and the Little Tennessee River.

In Cherokee, the pass is known as Ahalunun'yi (ᎠᎭᎷᏄn'Ᏹ), meaning "Ambush Place" or Uni'halu'na (ᎤᏂ'ᎭᎷ'Ꮎ), meaning "where they ambushed;" named after the occasion, probably in the mid-18th century, when the Cherokees ambushed a party of invading Shawnees, all of which were killed except for one, who was sent back (without his ears) to tell his people of the Cherokee victory.

U.S. Route 19 (Soco Road) traverses through the gap, which connects Cherokee and Maggie Valley. The Blue Ridge Parkway also passes through the gap, providing scenic views along the adjacent ridge lines. Additionally, the Mountains-to-Sea Trail passes through the pass.
