= Montebello, Virginia =

Unincorporated community in Virginia, U.S.

Coordinates: 37°51′49″N 79°08′16″W

Montebello is an unincorporated community in Nelson County, Virginia, United States. It was among the communities severely affected by flash flooding from Hurricane Camille in 1969.

== Climate ==
Montebello weather, in common with that throughout most of the Blue Ridge region, features mild, but occasionally hot summers, is cool and pleasant in the spring and fall and characterized by cold and occasionally snowy weather during the winter.
