= List of The Secret Saturdays episodes =

The cover of the second volume of The Secret Saturdays.

The Secret Saturdays is an animated television series that aired on Cartoon Network in most countries and on Teletoon in Canada. The episodes are directed by Scott Jeralds and produced by PorchLight Entertainment. The series debuted on Cartoon Network on October 3, 2008.

The series concentrates on the adventures of the Saturdays, a family of cryptozoologists who work to keep the truth about cryptids from getting out to protect the human race and the creatures themselves. The Saturdays travel the Earth searching for cryptids to study and battling twisted villains like the megalomaniac V.V. Argost. The series is influenced by the style of 1960s-era Hanna-Barbera action series (such as Jonny Quest) and is combined with creator Jay Stephens's own personal interest in cryptozoology.

The first season has 26 episodes and is focused primarily on the Saturdays' search for an ancient Sumerian cryptid called Kur, who has the power to control an army of cryptids. At the end of the season finale, it was revealed that Kur was none other than Zak Saturday, a fact of which not even Zak was aware. On November 7, 2009, a second season containing 10 episodes aired to follow up on the cliffhanger ending. It featured a self-contained story arc focused on Zak and his family dealing with the revelation of Zak being Kur and the consequences of that knowledge. The series ended on January 30, 2010. Contrary to what many people believe, there are only two seasons.

== Series overview ==
Season	Episodes	Originally released	
Season	Episodes	First released	Last released
1	26	October 3, 2008	August 1, 2009
2	10	November 7, 2009	January 30, 2010
T.G.I.S.		October 5, 2013	

== Episodes ==
=== Season 1 (2008–09) ===
No. overall	No. in season	Title	Written by	Original release date
1	1	"The Kur Stone: Part 1"	Written by : Brandon Sawyer; Storyboarded by : Scott Jeralds, David Jay Baker, Rick Hoberg, Lothell Jones, Steve Jones, Mike Manley, Brandon McKinney, Chuck Patton, Tom Ryder, Christopher Schenck, and Scooter Tidwell	October 3, 2008
2	2	"The Kur Stone: Part 2"	Written by : Brandon Sawyer; Storyboarded by : Scott Jeralds, Rick Hoberg, Lothell Jones, Steve Jones, Mike Manley, Brandon McKinney, Tom Ryder, and Scooter Tidwell	October 3, 2008
V.V. Argost returns looking for the Kur Stone, an ancient relic that was taken from him by the Secret Scientists eleven years ago. Despite managing to steal two of the pieces, the Saturday family have hidden theirs. Argost thus uses a Neural Parasite to control Dr. Cheveyo, a friend of the family, to reveal the final stone piece's location. Upon discovering the ruse, the Saturdays head to Manaus, Brazil to prevent V.V. Argost from getting to it. After a trek through the jungle, they are attacked and captured by Argost and his henchman, Munya, as soon as they dig it up. Though they manage to survive, Argost escapes with the stone piece. An Ornithocheirus joins the family and is christened 'Zon' by Zak. Kur finding clues: Kur Stone. Absent: Doyle Blackwell (Part 2)
3	3	"The Vengeance of Hibagon"	Written by : Laura McCreary; Storyboarded by : Scott Jeralds, David Jay Baker, Bret Blevins, Paul Harmon, Lothell Jones, Steve Jones, and Rafael Navarro	October 10, 2008
When the Saturday family travels to Tokyo, Japan to deal with an attacking Hibagon, they discover that it is actually a professor named Talu Mizuki who became trapped in the cryptid's body after he used a mind-transfer device he invented to escape the Japanese crime lord and philanthropist Shoji Fuzen and his original body was destroyed in a fire. Now bitter and seeking revenge, the Saturdays have to keep Mizuki from killing Fuzen. In the end, after arresting Fuzen, the Saturdays give Mizuki the technology needed for him to continue his research. Absent: Doyle Blackwell
4	4	"The Ice Caverns of Ellef Ringnes"	Written by : Adam Beechen; Storyboarded by : Scott Jeralds, Chuck Drost, Rick Hoberg, Edward Laroche, and Rafael Rosado	October 17, 2008
After disturbing an Inuit chamber in Ellef Ringnes, a Secret Scientist calls in the Saturday family to fight of a creature known as the Amarok. Zak and Fiskerton end up getting in a snowball fight when told to stay behind and Zak loses his weapon (The Claw). In their quest to recover it, they discover that Van Rook and his apprentice Doyle are the cause of the snowstorm, as well as have awakened the beast. Van Rook ends up awakening several more of them by stealing more artifacts from the chamber. Zak, with some help from Doyle, succeeds in putting the Amaroks back into eternal slumber by returning all the artifacts. Before leaving, Doyle returns Zak's Claw, having found it while raiding the chamber with Van Rook.
5	5	"Guess Who's Going to Be Dinner?"	Written by : Eddie Guzelian; Storyboarded by : Scott Jeralds, David Jay Baker, Francis Barrios, Steve Jones, and Brandon McKinney	October 24, 2008
Doc and Drew decide to go out for their anniversary, leaving Zak, Fiskerton, Komodo and Zon to watch the house. After tricking Dr. Beeman (their babysitter and another Secret Scientist) into thinking he has sighted a UFO, they get the house to themselves and decide to have some fun. However, a cryptid-eating criminal named Pietro "Piecemeal" Maltese invades the Saturday's HQ. While they are able to fight him off for a while, ignorant of his true intentions, they discover that he plans to eat Fiskerton. Zak is able to save Fiskerton using his mother's Tibetan Fire Sword, but (unbeknown to the family) Piecemeal manages to survive and escape. Absent: Doyle Blackwell
6	6	"The King of Kumari Kandam"	Written by : Brandon Sawyer; Storyboarded by : Scott Jeralds, Peter Ferk, Chuck Patton, Will Sweeney, and Scooter Tidwell	November 7, 2008
After the Saturdays track down the Popobawa in Pemba, Tanzania, they receive a distress call from a Secret Scientist claiming that the lost city of Kumari Kandam has resurfaced. Once they get there, they find that V.V. Argost has become the new king of the city. Doc and Drew are captured by his soldiers, while Zak and the cryptids escape to safety in the airship. They return to save Doc and Drew when they meet Prince Ulraj, who is the rightful heir to the city after Argost killed his father. Zak helps the boy reclaim his position as king, with the help of Doc. Unfortunately, despite saving the city and the Indian subcontinent, Drew is injured and Argost and Munya escape with another clue to locating Kur. Kur finding clues: Kumari Kandam king's medallion. Absent: Doyle Blackwell
7	7	"Van Rook's Apprentice"	Written by : Amy Wolfram; Storyboarded by : Scott Jeralds, Bret Blevins, Paul Harmon, Mike Manley, Tom Ryder, and Christopher Schenck	November 14, 2008
When the Saturdays look for the Alkali Lake Monster in Nebraska, they get into a fight with Van Rook and his apprentice, Doyle, over the creature's horn, another key to Kur's tomb. When Doyle's face is exposed during the ensuing battle, Drew realizes he might be her long-lost younger brother. Doyle arranges a meeting, but V.V. Argost promptly attacks them. When Drew hears that Doc has also been attacked by Munya and Van Rook, she believes that Doyle has tricked her. In the end, Doyle is able to redeem himself by bringing a piece of the Kur Stone, stolen from Argost, to the Saturdays HQ. Now unemployed, he moves in with the family, much to Doc's dismay. Kur finding clues: Lake monster's horn.
8	8	"Twelve Hundred Degrees; Fahrenheit"	Written by : Ross Beeley; Storyboarded by : Scott Jeralds, Chuck Drost, Rick Hoberg, Edward Laroche, and Rafael Rosado	November 21, 2008
The family heads to Chile to help Dr. Cheechoo. When the Orsono Volcano erupts, a lizard-man known as the Cherufe is released. After battling the creature, they discover that V.V. Argost and Munya are also there, searching for a clue to finding Kur in the creature's nest. Drew ventures into the volcano when the family discovers what he's after. She battles Argost over one of the creature's eggs within the volcano, apparently defeating him and returns the stolen egg to the mother. However, Argost succeeds in retrieving one of the crystals on the egg. Kur finding clues: Volcano creature's egg's crystal.
9	9	"The Owlman Feeds at Midnight"	Written by : Josh Harmon and Scott Elder; Storyboarded by : Scott Jeralds, Francis Barrios, Mark Howard, Tim Maltby, Brandon McKinney, and Steve Muller	November 28, 2008
The Saturdays travel to Southern Cornwall, England looking for another clue to finding Kur. While there, they end up finding a bizarre cult that worships the Owlman. The cult captures the family and attempts to feed Zak to the cryptid, but Doyle helps Zak to escape the creature. The family returns to the Owlman's cave to find the clue they were looking for, using light to defeat the nocturnal creature. However, Doyle overdoes it and causes the Owlman to die in a puff of smoke. The cave later collapses and a map to Kur is revealed, with all the villagers free from the Owlman's control. However, Doc fires Doyle for putting Zak's life in danger before they realize this. Kur finding clues: A map that shows Kur's tomb's location, but the location in the world stays unknown.
10	10	"The Swarm at the Edge of Space"	Written by : Brooks Wachtel; Storyboarded by : Scott Jeralds, Chris Berkeley, Peter Ferk, Chuck Patton, Will Sweeney, and Todd Waterman	December 5, 2008
When the Saturdays rescue an aircraft under attack by a swarm of atmospheric jellyfish, they discover that it is being ridden by Agent Epsilon and his son, Francis, who appeared to do nothing but play a video game. The Jellyfish turn on their airship, injuring Epsilon in the ensuing battle. Zak soon discovers that Francis is the one responsible for provoking the Jellyfish, as his "game" is actually a prototype control device that is driving them crazy. Francis forces Zak into capturing one of the Jellyfish for study, but Zak is able to sneak the control device into the container with it, forcing Francis to abandon both once he discovers the trick. Absent: Doyle Blackwell
11	11	"Eterno"	Written by : Todd Garfield; Storyboarded by : Scott Jeralds, Paul Harmon, Dave Schwartz, Rhoy Shishido, and Scooter Tidwell	April 10, 2009
When water supplies in the Middle East are inexplicably transforming into salt, the Secret Scientists send Drew and Zak Saturday into the area to investigate. A young waif named Wadi reveals that she is the cause, having released Eterno, a giant man made of salt who has an unquenchable thirst and a death wish. When Drew and some local villagers refuse to lead him to the Methuselah Tree, Eterno turns them into salt statues. Zak and Wadi venture to the plant to gain the sap Eterno requires to end his suffering. But Wadi steals a flower from the tree, which sends two Centiscarabs after her. Eterno steals the flower and uses all the sap, which destroys him. The scientists synthesize more sap from the remains and return everything back to normal. Absent: Doyle Blackwell
12	12	"Black Monday"	Written by : Joelle Sellner; Storyboarded by : Scott Jeralds, Shannon Denton, Charlie Grosvenor, Rick Hoberg, Edward Laroche, and Rafael Rosado	April 17, 2009
When Zak touches the mystic Smoke Mirror of Tezcatlipoca, it unleashes evil doppelgangers of the Saturdays whom Zak christens the Monday family. The duplicates attempt to trap the Saturdays in their reality, where they are wanted criminals instead of heroes. However, their own in-fighting causes them to trap themselves instead, destroying the mirror in the process. The Saturdays leave Mesoamerica in their airship, unaware that the evil Zak Monday and Komodo have managed to escape. Absent: Doyle Blackwell
13	13	"Cryptid vs. Cryptid"	Written by : Brandon Sawyer; Storyboarded by : Scott Jeralds, Jay Baker, Francis Barrios, Bret Blevins, Lothell Jones, Brandon McKinney, and Steve Jones	April 24, 2009
When the Saturdays discover the existence of underground cryptid fights run by Leonidas Van Rook, they suspect that he may be getting help from V.V. Argost. To infiltrate the competition, they re-hire Doyle to be Fiskerton's "manager". After stealing Van Rook's handheld, the Saturdays try to discover what Argost is planning, but stop to help the cryptids escape when Fiskerton is pitted against the Rakshasa and Zak's powers go haywire. With all the creatures safely released into the wild, the family comes to the sudden realization that the grudge matches were a diversion created by Argost, so he could enter Kur's Tomb. Unfortunately, the Saturdays are too late, since he has already retrieved a tablet with the face of Fiskerton that was contained within. Kur finding clues: Kur's tomb is found. A table with the face of Fiskerton.
14	14	"The Underworld Bride"	Written by : Laura McCreary; Storyboarded by : Scott Jeralds, Shannon Denton, Sebastian Montes, Garrett; O'Donoghue, Chuck Patton, Will Sweeney, and Todd Waterman	May 8, 2009
The Saturday family and King Ulraj travel to New Guinea to investigate the Duah, a pterosaur cryptid that has recently been causing trouble for the locals. The Saturdays discover that the creature was trying to attract a mate and has chosen Zon. Zak tries desperately to separate the couple, in fear he will never see Zon again if she chooses to go with the cryptid. When the family and Ulraj learn of the Duah's plot to take his new bride to the underworld and eat her alive, they try even harder to bring Zon back to the airship. When the island begins to sink, Ulraj tells Zak that his cryptid powers only work if the creature truly wants to do what is asked of it. Zak manages to break Zon out of her crush and send the Duah back to the underworld. Absent: Doyle Blackwell
15	15	"Ghost in the Machine"	Written by : Mark Palmer; Storyboarded by : Scott Jeralds, Paul Harmon, Mark Howard, Dave Schwartz, and Rhoy Shishido	May 15, 2009
Doc is visited by the ghost of his deceased mentor, Dr. Lancaster, in the form of an EVP. The family go to Honey Island Swamp to complete what remains of his work: a database cataloging the DNA of every cryptid on Earth. While Doc and Drew finish the project, Zak, Fiskerton and Komodo bump into a number of humanoid cryptids, including the Honey Island Swamp monster. After repelling the cryptids, Doc and Drew continue their work unaware that they are aiding a group of rogue governmental scientists led by Dr. Lee, who later captures Zak, Komodo, and Fiskerton, as well as fuse them into a cryptid hybrid known as "Zakermodo". When Doc and Drew look for Zak, they run into the scientists, whom Doc identifies as Dr. Lancaster's colleagues and members of a secret Cryptid super-soldier project. The scientists intend to make the Saturdays use their airship as leverage to have the scientists' device taken out of the area, in exchange for them restoring Zak, Fiskerton and Komodo back to normal. Just then, the cryptids from before return in force with the resulting attack freeing Zakermodo, who is unfused. After listening to a recording left by Dr. Lancaster, the family decides to destroy all records of the project, hand Dr. Lee and his colleagues over to the authorities with evidence of their criminal activities, as well as return home. Absent: Doyle Blackwell
16	16	"Something in the Water"	Written by : Andrew R. Robinson; Storyboarded by : Scott Jeralds, Rick Hoberg, Mike Manley, Rafael Rosado, and Tom Ryder	May 22, 2009
The Saturdays find a hidden, self-sustaining city called Sanctuary II which is plagued by two catfish-like cryptids called Lau. Doc offers to help relocate the fish without charge, but the inhabitants instead opt to hire Doyle to capture them. Joined by Zak and Fiskerton, Doyle successfully captures the fish. Back in the city, Doc and Drew discover that Sanctuary II is using a mother Lau as an energy source, hence the constant attempts by her offspring to free her. Doyle, Zak and Fisk return with the captured Lau and Doyle takes his payment without getting involved. The Saturdays are not so quick to leave, resulting in a fight between them and the inhabitants. Doyle returns and helps Zak release all the Lau, who promptly trash the city. Doc asks Doyle if he will return, but he refuses.
17	17	"Target: Fiskerton"	Written by : Adam Beechen; Storyboarded by : Scott Jeralds, Francis Barrios, Steve Jones, Edward Laroche, and Scooter Tidwell	May 29, 2009
V.V. Argost and Munya retrieve Leonidas Van Rook from prison, so that he and Piecemeal can kidnap Fiskerton, whom Argost believes to be Kur. They lure the Saturdays to Switzerland with a fake Buratsche-ah-llgs, a lake monster cryptid that appears to be a mass of unformed tissue. During the ensuing battle, Doc puts Fiskerton in charge with protecting Zak, believing that his son is the target. When Zak and Fiskerton are trapped on a runaway train heading for a dead-end, Argost reveals that Fiskerton is the true target and that he should turn himself in for Zak's life, which Fiskerton does reluctantly. Realizing that Argost had tricked him and had no intentions of stopping the runaway train with Zak in it, Fiskerton springs into action. Just as Zak's life is saved, Argost and Munya take off with the collapsed gorilla-cat, leaving a distraught Zak behind. Doc and Drew show up to claim Zak in sheer supposed victory, but they soon ask where's Fiskerton and a tearful Zak replies that he protected him. Kur finding clues: Argost captures Fiskerton, because he thinks Fiskerton is Kur. Note: Doyle Blackwell only appears in a flashback.
18	18	"Once More the Nightmare Factory"	Written by : Brandon Sawyer; Storyboarded by : Scott Jeralds, Shannon Denton, Brandon McKinney, Sebastian Montes, and Will Sweeney	June 5, 2009
To rescue Fiskerton, the Saturday family invades Weirdworld and is joined by Doyle. A snake woman, the Queen of Nāgas, reveals to V.V. Argost that Fiskerton is not the cryptid Kur as he expected, but a Lemurian, which can lead him to the creature. Doyle overhears this conversation and enters the room to rescue Fiskerton shortly after the revelation. Meanwhile, after the family goes through many trials, Drew is able to photograph the final piece of the Kur Stone. In the end, the family escapes safely with Fiskerton. Doc asks Doyle to train Zak, recognizing that Doyle possesses unique skills that neither he nor Drew could teach. Doyle agrees to this, but he and Fiskerton keep quiet about the information that they have learned. Kur finding clues: Fiskerton isn't Kur, but he can lead to Kur. Nāga also has a Kur detector which glows when Kur is near.
19	19	"Curse of the Stolen Tiger"	Written by : Henry Gilroy; Storyboarded by : Scott Jeralds, Bret Blevins, Mario Danna Jr., Shannon Denton, Rhoy Shishido, and Todd Waterman	June 12, 2009
The Saturday family, Doyle and Wadi learn that Shoji Fuzen has stolen a rare Maltese tiger cryptid which normally grants good luck but causes the opposite in Zak's presence. After several failed attempts to convince his family of this, he finally gets frustrated and uses his powers on the tiger, causing bad luck for everyone in the area. Using this new found information, Zak defeats Fuzen's army, destroying much of the nearby village in the process. Though glad to be rid of Fuzen, they kindly ask that Zak be removed from the area before more damage is caused.
20	20	"The Kur Guardian"	Written by : Todd Garfield; Storyboarded by : Scott Jeralds, Jennifer Graves, Rick Hoberg, Mark Howard, and Dave Schwartz	June 19, 2009
Zak and Doyle help Fiskerton to uncover the secrets of his Lemurian heritage with the aid of former Secret Scientist Abbey Grey, an expert in ancient civilizations and Zak's babysitter when he was young. They travel to the hidden Library of Alexandria in Egypt, where all information on Lemuria is stored. The knowledge gathered here leads them to Shangri-La, learning that Fiskerton is meant to guard the Earth against Kur's evil. Rani Nāgi attacks the group to eliminate Fiskerton, but is repelled by the stone. With the truth about his people uncovered, Fiskerton decides that it is time to tell Doc and Drew. Kur finding clues: It is revealed that Fiskerton and his people have a duty of guarding the world from Kur. Absent: Zon Note: Doc, Drew, and Komodo appear in flashbacks.
21	21	"Food of the Giants"	Written by : Alicia Sky Varinaitis; Storyboarded by : Scott Jeralds, Chuck Drost, Paul Harmon, Steve Jones, Chuck Patton, and Tom Ryder	June 27, 2009
The Saturday family and Abbey go to the Allegheny Mountains to help with the cryptid Allegewi, which has been causing trouble at a logging camp. During their search for the creature, it is revealed that Abbey is Van Rook's new apprentice. She intends to leave the family trapped so that the cryptid can eat them, but is caught off-guard and stuck with the family. The Allegewi releases them all, so it can hunt them as proper prey. This allows the group to turn things around on the beast and find the missing loggers. In the end, Abbey risks her own life to save Zak and Doyle, but promises that she will return to finish the job she was hired to do.
22	22	"The Atlas Pin"	Written by : Ross Beeley; Storyboarded by : Scott Jeralds, Edward Laroche, Brandon McKinney, Will Sweeney, and Scooter Tidwell	July 4, 2009
When V.V. Argost steals Rani Nāgi's Kur-detecting relic, she threatens to destroy the Atlas Pin, a giant rock which holds the tectonic plates together, unless the Saturdays recover the relic for her. The Saturdays decide split into two groups: Doyle, Zon, Doc, and Fiskerton will search for Argost. Meanwhile, Zak, Drew, and Komodo search for Rani Nāgi around Kumari Kandam. Drew's group is forced to fight the Kumari Serpent, now under Rani Nāgi's control. They manage to subdue the serpent and find her with her bodyguards, who pull the Atlas Pin in retaliation. Ulraj comes to their aide and is able to prevent disaster with the help of the serpent. At the same time, Doc's group battles Argost for the relic, successfully retrieving it after a prolonged fight. Fiskerton destroys the relic, deciding to use his instincts to find Kur, but Doyle covertly recovers the pieces. Kur finding clues: Nāga's Kur detector is broken.
23	23	"Paris Is Melting"	Written by : Chris Bowman; Storyboarded by : Scott Jeralds, Bret Blevins, Shannon Denton, Mike Manley, and Todd Waterman	July 11, 2009
When Fiskerton is apparently responsible for several attacks on Secret Scientists, Zak and the family cryptids go on a quest to clear his names. They are led to the Louvre Museum by Zak and Komodo Monday, who need Zak to retrieve their airship from their universe, now accessible through the repaired smoke mirror. With it, they plan to cause havoc on a global scale. Zak steals the airship as asked, but drains the power cell before returning it. When Zak and Komodo Monday attempt to take off, without a source of re-fueling, it falls out of the sky and back into the mirror, trapping Zak and Komodo Monday in it again.
24	24	"Where Lies the Engulfer"	Written by : Todd Garfield; Storyboarded by : Scott Jeralds, Rick Hoberg, Mark Howard, Dave Schwartz, and Clint Taylor	July 18, 2009
Doyle takes Zak to an abandoned tourist resort in Canada for a training mission about deception, but they soon discover that the town is abandoned for good reason when the nearby lake, the Hînqûmemen, comes to life and attacks them. Doyle decides to distract the lake while Zak gets help, assuring him that he has a reserve oxygen tank with plenty of air. Zak quickly realizes that Doyle was exaggerating about his oxygen supply to keep him safe and returns to rescue Doyle with a wheelbarrow full of quick-dry cement, which turns parts of the lake into stone. Zak and Doyle make their escape, then arrange for cement to be dropped in the lake by helicopter. When they return home, Doc reveals that the water was infested with small parasitic cryptids. Absents: Fiskerton, Komodo, Zon
25	25	"Shadows of Lemuria"	Written by : Bill Motz and Bob Roth; Storyboarded by : Scott Jeralds, Paul Harmon, Steve Jones, Rafael Rosado, and Will Sweeney	July 25, 2009
The Saturday family call on paraneurologist Dr. David Bara to find the motivation behind Fiskerton's strange instinctual behavior, while V.V. Argost sends a Neural Parasite to the Saturdays' home to extract Kur's location by force. Doyle, hidden within his room, fixes the Nāga's Kur-detecting relic. When Argost's parasite attaches to Fiskerton, Fisk's subconscious attempts to fight. Taking control of Bara's equipment, Fiskerton builds several robots that destroy the Saturday HQ, using the wreckage to build a large divining rod. Once Zak removes the parasite, Fiskerton reveals that the identity of Kur will be revealed in Antarctica. As the Saturdays depart to find Kur, Argost, having been watching through his neural parasite, sets off for the same destination. Kur finding clues: Nāga's Kur detector is fixed. Kur's location is revealed to be in Antarctica.
26	26	"Kur Rising"	Written by : Brandon Sawyer; Storyboarded by : Scott Jeralds, Edward Laroche, Mike Manley, Brandon McKinney, and Scooter Tidwell	August 1, 2009
Upon arriving in Antarctica, V.V. Argost releases Kur from beneath the ice. The Saturdays battle against Kur, giving Argost the opportunity to sneak inside its body and control it from within. Zak and Fiskerton follow Argost inside, pitting his powers against Kur's might. After a long struggle, Zak manages to overcome Kur, knocking it unconscious. The cryptids formerly under Argost's control turn on him, forcing Munya to carry him out to safety. Outside of Kur, Doyle uses the Kur-sensing relic to solidify the point that they are near Kur. However, once Zak is expelled from Kur's body, the glow begins to fade. Doyle approaches Zak and the artifact glows strongly once more—showing that Zak is Kur. Kur finding clues: Kur is revealed to be Zak.

=== Season 2 (2009–10) ===
No. overall	No. in season	Title	Written by	Original release date
27	1	"Kur: Part 1"	Written by : Brandon Sawyer; Storyboarded by : Scott Jeralds, Francis Barrios, Bret Blevins, Peter Ferk, Paul Harmon, Rick Hoberg, Chuck Patton, Scooter Tidwell, and Todd Waterman	November 7, 2009
28	2	"Kur: Part 2"	Written by : Brandon Sawyer; Storyboarded by : Scott Jeralds, Francis Barrios, Bret Blevins, Peter Ferk, Paul Harmon, Rick Hoberg, Chuck Patton, Scooter Tidwell, and Todd Waterman	November 14, 2009
Six months later, the Saturdays are on the run from the other Secret Scientists, who wish to take Zak into custody to prevent any "problems". Zak and the rest of the family struggle to understand the powers of Kur and deal with the threat of the Nagas, Doyle and Zon reluctantly enlist the help of a now penniless Van Rook to find the missing V.V. Argost and thwart the Naga's war against humanity. After stopping the invasion, Zak ultimately decides to align himself with Argost, who offers to teach Zak how to control his powers.
29	3	"The Thousand Eyes of Ahuizotl"	Written by : Todd Garfield; Storyboarded by : Scott Jeralds, Dave Chlystek, Tom Ryder, Dave Schwartz, and Will Sweeney	November 21, 2009
After listening to the cryptic advice of V.V. Argost, Zak urges his family to head to Mexico to deal with the Ahuizotl. But during a mini-vacation before going on their search, they are ambushed by Miranda Grey and Deadbolt. After the battle, they then wander into a jungle village where the majority of the villagers have lost their eyes. The Saturdays split up and Zak sneaks off to find the Ahuizotl. The Ahuizotl attacks the family, but a young girl from the village named Tiacapan comes to their aid. As the Saturdays ward away the cryptid, Tiacapan reveals that the village is going to sacrifice Miranda to the beast. After saving her, in the ensuing battle, Zak discovers that he can now sense the movements of cryptids. Using this to re-seal the cryptid into its tomb, the family leaves and Zak is forbidden to watch TV due to using "Weird World" as an excuse to go to Mexico. Absents: Doyle Blackwell, Zon
30	4	"Into the Mouth of Darkness"	Written by : Ross Beeley; Storyboarded by : Scott Jeralds, Rich Arons, Edward Laroche, Rafael Rosado, and Christopher Schenck	December 5, 2009
The Saturdays begin searching for the Epic of Gilgamesh, which would help them in finding a solution to Zak's Kur power. After finding clues that the tablet was taken by Vikings from the lair of an Algerian Sea Centipede, the family heads to Greenland. Instead, they end up in Australia when the airship gets infested by Bunyips by V.V. Argost. Zak finds himself having to keep the secret of his alliance with Argost, while also fighting alongside his parents to keep up the charade and locate the monster of the abandoned mine. Leaving the rest of his family in the dust, Zak confronts Argost alone. Realizing from Argost that he was the monster the cryptids were fearing and that his powers had started to corrupt him, he lets him escape and hides this revelation from his parents. Meanwhile, Doyle and Van Rook track down Baron Finster to uncover the secrets of Argost's past, learning that he was previously poor.
31	5	"The Legion of Garuda"	Written by : Ross Beeley; Storyboarded by : Scott Jeralds, Bret Blevins, Rick Hoberg, Chuck Patton, and Scooter Tidwell	December 12, 2009
After recovering the Epic of Gilgamesh, the Saturdays learn about a sect of Indian sorcerers who were able to drive out the spirit of Kur in the past and attempt to find them in hopes that the group can do it again. Eventually, they met Gokul who is the headmaster of the Legion of Garuda. They learn that a ritual using the Flute of Gilgamesh must be performed to drive out Kur's spirit. However, the Nagas had stolen the artifact millennia ago, so the Saturdays fight to retrieve it. During the ritual, the Saturdays realize that removing Kur's spirit will kill Zak, and get help from the Secret Scientists and the Nagas to rescue him. After they leave the site, Argost arrives and takes the flute. Absents: Doyle Blackwell, Zon
32	6	"The Return of Tsul 'Kalu"	Written by : Todd Garfield; Storyboarded by : Scott Jeralds, Francis Barrios, Peter Ferk, Paul Harmon, Rafael Rosado, and Todd Waterman	December 19, 2009
The Saturdays return to their headquarters to retrieve tomes from Drew's library and are ambushed by Tsul 'Kalu, a cryptid whose hand relic now resides at the end of Zak's Claw. It turns out he was the one who blinded Doc's eye when Zak accidentally caused a rockslide, destroying an important stone relic. Zak finally defeats him and learns a valuable lesson through visions (what the Tsul 'Kalu feared most) caused by the Claw in the creature's presence. Afterwards, Tsul 'Kalu gives Zak his staff, believing that he deserves it, and becomes his ally. Meanwhile, Doyle and Van Rook arrive in Morocco to find the cryptid black market and obtain an orange ape-like cryptid.
33	7	"The Unblinking Eye"	Written by : Ross Beeley; Storyboarded by : Scott Jeralds, Tom Ryder, Dave Schwartz, Joe Sichta, and Will Sweeney	January 9, 2010
While the Saturdays are resting in the Sahara Desert, Epsilon and Francis show up saying they want to recruit Kur. Epsilon tells Zak that Francis will be the one to train him. When Zak declines they decide to take him by force. Once the Saturdays get on the airship Zak tells his parents that he wants to help a cryptid because he "wants to do some good" and they go to Istanbul to extract the Lake Van Monster. But the operation hits a snag when Epsilon and Francis show up again. Drew and Doc want Zak to run, but he is determined to help the cryptid, saying that is what they do and that he needs to help something instead of running. Epsilon's "people" have a satellite with the Naga's Kur detecting relic in it, helping them find Zak wherever they go. Doc uses the Griffin to go up into space. After find out that Epsilon's people have a giant space station floating in space, Doc locates the Naga's Kur detecting relic and destroys it. Francis finds Zak trying to help the cryptid and says he is "painfully predictable". He then reveals that he is not Epsilon's son, but they are both clones of their people's best agent from one hundred years ago. Francis lets Zak escape and Zak sets the Lake Van Monster free. Absents: Doyle Blackwell, Zon
34	8	"Life in the Underground"	Written by : Adam Beechen; Storyboarded by : Scott Jeralds, Rich Arons, Edward Laroche, Mike Manley, and Rafael Rosado	January 16, 2010
Zak's birthday party is filled with surprises, including a visit from Ulraj and Wadi. The Saturdays find out a town is being attacked by cryptids. When the Saturdays come to investigate, they are attacked. Zak's crush for Wadi and hers for him are made more open in this episode. Zak later encounters Argost in a clock tower, who hints at Kur's ability to control an entire army of cryptids from long distances. Zak, Wadi and Ulraj pursue the cryptids underground. Eventually, they fall into a pit that starts to fill with dirt. As they were being buried alive, Zak remembered Argost's words and managed to summon one of the cryptids to save them. The three soon learn that the cryptids were actually making a survival colony to save themselves from Kur. Realizing this, Zak assures the cryptids that he has no intention to harm them or anyone and ultimately earns their trust. Zak returns to the clock tower to thank Argost, who then gives Zak a neural parasite to contact him with should the need arise, despite Fisk's objections. Absents: Doyle Blackwell, Zon
35	9	"And Your Enemies Closer"	Written by : Todd Garfield; Storyboarded by : Scott Jeralds, Peter Ferk, Tom Ryder, Scooter Tidwell, and Will Sweeney	January 23, 2010
Doc, Zak, and Fiskerton strike a bargain with the Secret Scientists: the Saturdays will remove a cryptid from Beeman's Lab in exchange for a six-month truce. The Saturdays try and fail to restrain the cryptid themselves so Zak uses the neural parasite to contact Argost who provides the solution, though the neural parasite is discovered and Zak flees with Argost before being rendered unconscious by Argost. Meanwhile, Doyle and Van Rook have met up with Drew and the Tibetan monks and made their way to the lair of the Yeti: the beast that attacked the Blackwell camp years ago and separated the family. Argost unveils his plan to bring Zak Monday into their universe and use the Flute of Gilgamesh to siphon his powers, killing him, as well as revealing himself to be a yeti as Doyle and Drew discover the mold used to make his mask. Zak takes control of Munya using his powers to defend himself from Argost, but is rescued by Doc, Fiskerton, Komodo, and Tsul 'Kalu as Argost flees to raise his cryptid army.
36	10	"War of the Cryptids"	Written by : Brandon Sawyer; Storyboarded by : Scott Jeralds, Francis Barrios, Rick Hoberg, Chuck Patton, and Scooter Tidwell	January 30, 2010
Argost starts his cryptid invasion of the Earth, leading an assault on Washington D.C. After the Saturdays arrive, a fight ensues. Zak goes to confront Argost where he tells him that he too has raised a cryptid army of his own with Wadi, Ulraj, Tsul 'Kalu and many more serving as de facto generals. The Secret Scientists then show up armed with an audio recording of the Flute of Gilgamesh which they use to hurt Argost and Zak. However Miranda Grey, not wanting to kill Zak, destroys the controls to Beeman's ship and Argost escapes with the flute recording. Having retreated to Weird World, he is confronted by the Nagas who pledge their allegiance to Argost. Argost then, on the Naga's advice, orders his army to begin killing the humans. The Saturdays once again invade Weird World where they begin fighting the Nagas. In the process, Van Rook is killed as he sacrifices himself to stop Rani Nagi from killing Drew. Zak, realizing his family may also soon die, agrees to Argost's terms. Argost then surrounds himself with sound-proof glass and uses the flute recording to steal Zak's powers, killing him. However, the interaction of Zak Saturday and Monday's powers kills Argost and deprives Zak of most of his powers. Subsequently, Zak is revived and the Saturdays pay their respects at Van Rook's grave. A news anchorman reports on the incident, saying global climate change is likely to blame and asks if the cryptids left either because they chose to or if the planet owes a debt to a group of unsung heroes.

== The Secret Saturdays/Ben 10 crossover ==
Title	Directed by	Written by	Original release date
"T.G.I.S."	Chris Berkeley	Written by : Joelle Sellner; Storyboarded by : Tom De Rosier, Chris Copeland, Tanner Johnson, James Yang, Mark Howard, Jason Zurek, Aluir Amancio, Matthew Long, Kenji Ono, and Matthew Youngberg	October 5, 2013
This episode takes place 3 years after the last episode. Argost returns in a new incarnation. The Secret Saturdays come to Bellwood to help Ben and Rook investigate a rash of chupacabra attacks where they've been draining alien lifeforce. They soon discover that the chupacabras are being controlled by Dr. Animo where he successfully revives V.V. Argost in a hybrid body. Now Ben, Rook, as well as the Secret Saturdays must work together to stop the alliance of Dr. Animo and V.V. Argost when they plan to make an army of "Franken-Cryptids". Note: This special episode is a crossover between the same The Secret Saturdays and Ben 10: Omniverse.
