= Judaculla Rock =

Historic petrograph rock in North Carolina, US

- U.S. National Register of Historic Places
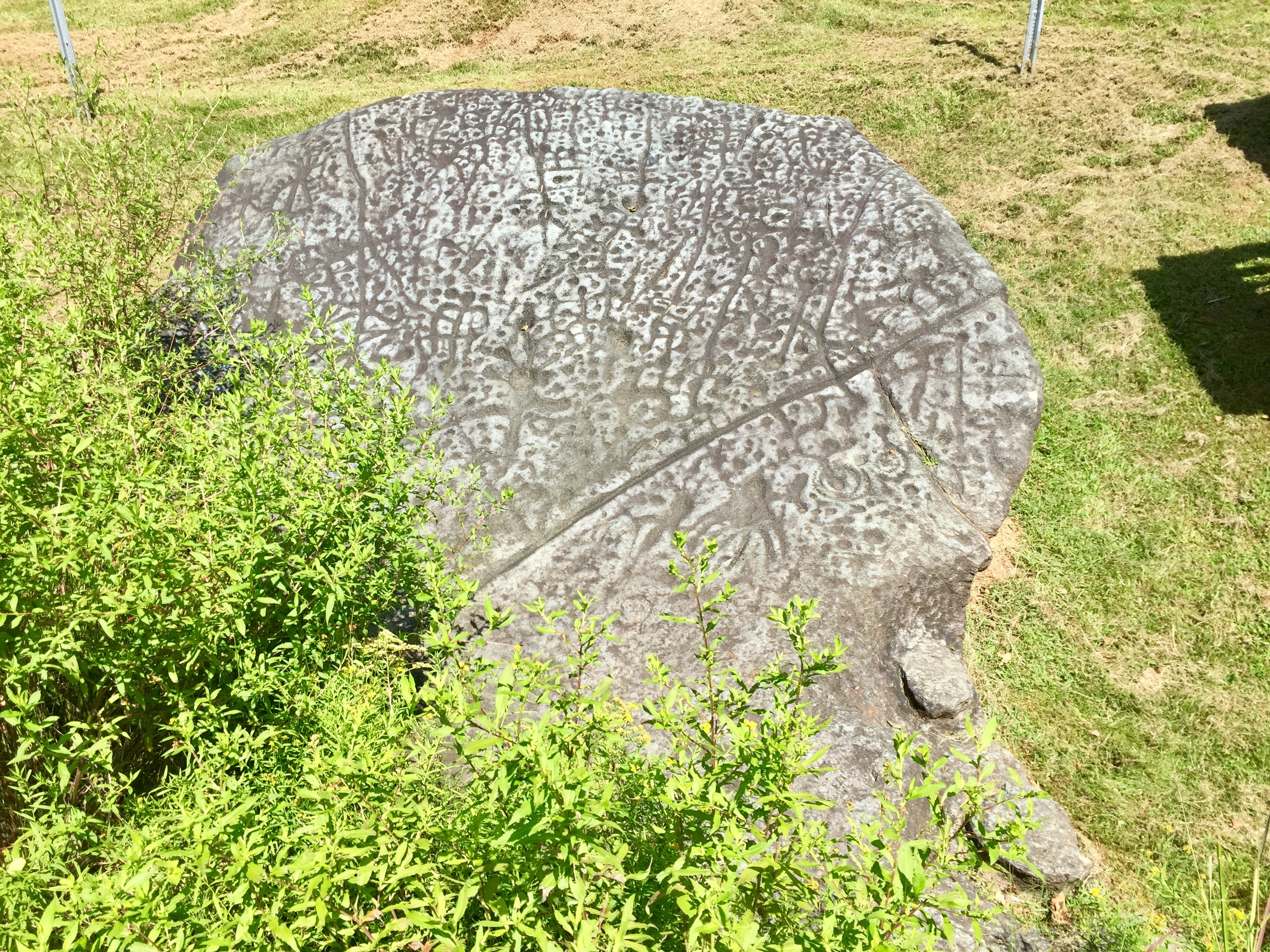
- Judaculla Rock, August 2018

- Location within North Carolina Location within the United States
- Location: 552 Judaculla Rock Rd., Cullowhee, North Carolina
- Coordinates: 35°18′02″N 83°06′34″W
- NRHP reference No.: 13000116
- Added to NRHP: March 27, 2013

Judaculla Rock is a curvilinear-shaped outcrop of soapstone known for its ancient carvings and petroglyphs. The archaeological site is located on a 0.85-acre rectangular-shaped property, now owned by Jackson County. It is approximately 60 meters east of Caney Fork Creek, a major branch of the northwestward-trending Tuckasegee River in the mountains of Western North Carolina.

The petroglyph boulder occurs within a man-made bowl-shaped depression. Today the land is covered with mowed turf grass (previously, it was cultivated as a cornfield) and bordered on the west by a thicket of rivercane (Arundinaria gigantea). Slightly upslope and east of the boulder are a few smaller outcroppings of soapstone bedrock, at least two of which show definite scars left by ancient quarrying for soapstone bowl manufacture. The site is listed on the National Register of Historic Places.

== Description ==
The surface of the westward-slanting main boulder is covered with petroglyphs. It measures roughly 22 square meters (240 sq ft). The boulder carries scars resulting from soapstone bowl extraction. Three depressions show stem extraction to make pipes, and three more are hollow scallops.

Numerous petroglyphs have been pecked and incised into the surface. The densely packed motifs, especially those along the upper two-thirds of the boulder, often make it difficult to distinguish among the carvings. A minimum count of the patterns has revealed 1,458 cup marks, 47 curvilinear units, 10 bowl-shaped depressions, 10 stick-like figures, 9 rills, 3 concentric rings designs, 3 curvilinear motifs, 3 deer tracks, 3 claw-like imprints, 1 arc, 1 cross-in-circle, and 1 winged shape.

== Date range ==
Petroglyphs that occur within three hollow scallops suggest that their production took place after soapstone bowl quarrying had ceased at the site. This finding is supported by similar overlaps at a smaller soapstone boulder, Brinkley Rock, in western North Carolina and two others, Track Rock Gap and Sprayberry Rock in northern Georgia.

In terms of stylistic cross-dating, the similarity between the concentric ring and cross-in-ring petroglyphs on the boulder with patterns on ceramics from the region suggests that the petroglyphs, made over the Late Archaic soapstone extraction scars, date somewhere between the Middle Woodland and late Mississippian culture periods, roughly 200 CE to 1400 CE.

Controlled archaeological excavations around the boulder revealed deposits that were extensively disturbed in historic times, likely by cultivation. This disrupted researchers' ability to date levels of soils. But, auger sampling of soils higher on the slope suggest intact layers remain. These layers, containing soapstone and lithic fragments left by soapstone bowl manufacture, probably date to the Late Archaic period (say, 2000 to 1000 BCE).

== Cherokee oral history ==
Judaculla Rock retains a special significance for the Cherokee. The majority of Cherokee people were forcibly removed to Indian Territory in 1838, but both the tribes in Oklahoma and the one in North Carolina continue to teach their oral history. Cherokee accounts link Judaculla (also known as Tuli-cula/Juthcullah/Tsul 'Kalu), their slant-eyed Master-of-Game, with the surrounding landscape, including landforms, rivers, and Cherokee towns.

The petroglyph boulder is located on an old trail that linked the former Cherokee townhouse at Cullowhee, or "Juthcullah's Place," with Judaculla's reputed townhouse within Tanasee Bald (also known as Tsunegûñyĭ). Today the federally recognized Eastern Band of Cherokee Indians is based in Swain and Jackson counties in Western North Carolina. They and the two Cherokee tribes in Oklahoma continue to regard this boulder as spiritually significant.

In Cherokee tradition, the rock's markings are explained as the imprint left when Judaculla, leaping from his mountaintop to drive off trespassing hunters, landed with his hand on the then-soft stone and scratched it with his fingernail. Until the Cherokee removal of 1838, priests and hunters are said to have visited the rock to leave offerings and petition him for success in the hunt.

The Cherokee educator Tom Belt has described Judaculla Rock as a kind of "text" or "manuscript" that grounds Cherokee identity and teaches how to care for the land.

== Significance ==
From a rock art perspective, the boulder is significant in part because it contains more petroglyphs than any other known boulder east of the Mississippi River. Judaculla Rock contains approximately 1,548 motifs, 3.7 times the total of 421 motifs at the substantial Track Rock Gap petroglyph boulder complex in far northern Georgia.

From an archaeological perspective, the intact deposits upslope from Judaculla Rock contain physical traces of Late Archaic soapstone quarrying and bowl manufacturing activities. The location of Judaculla Rock between Cullowhee townhouse and Judaculla's townhouse in Tanasee Bald is expressed in Cherokee stories of other petroglyph boulders in the mountains and foothills of North Carolina and northern Georgia. These intermediary locations tie the Cherokee summer agricultural cultivation in the floodplains to their practice of fall and winter hunting in the uplands.

It has been proposed that the petroglyph boulders are stylized picture maps of the terrain where they are found, and that it may yet yield additional information about the history and prehistory of the area. In an earlier interpretation, Ritter and Ritter cited Judaculla Rock as a notable example of cupule and vulviform (female-genital) motifs that they associated with fertility or "increase" rites.

Loubser has interpreted the marked boulder as a threshold between the everyday world and the world of the spirits, a place where the upper and lower worlds are brought together.

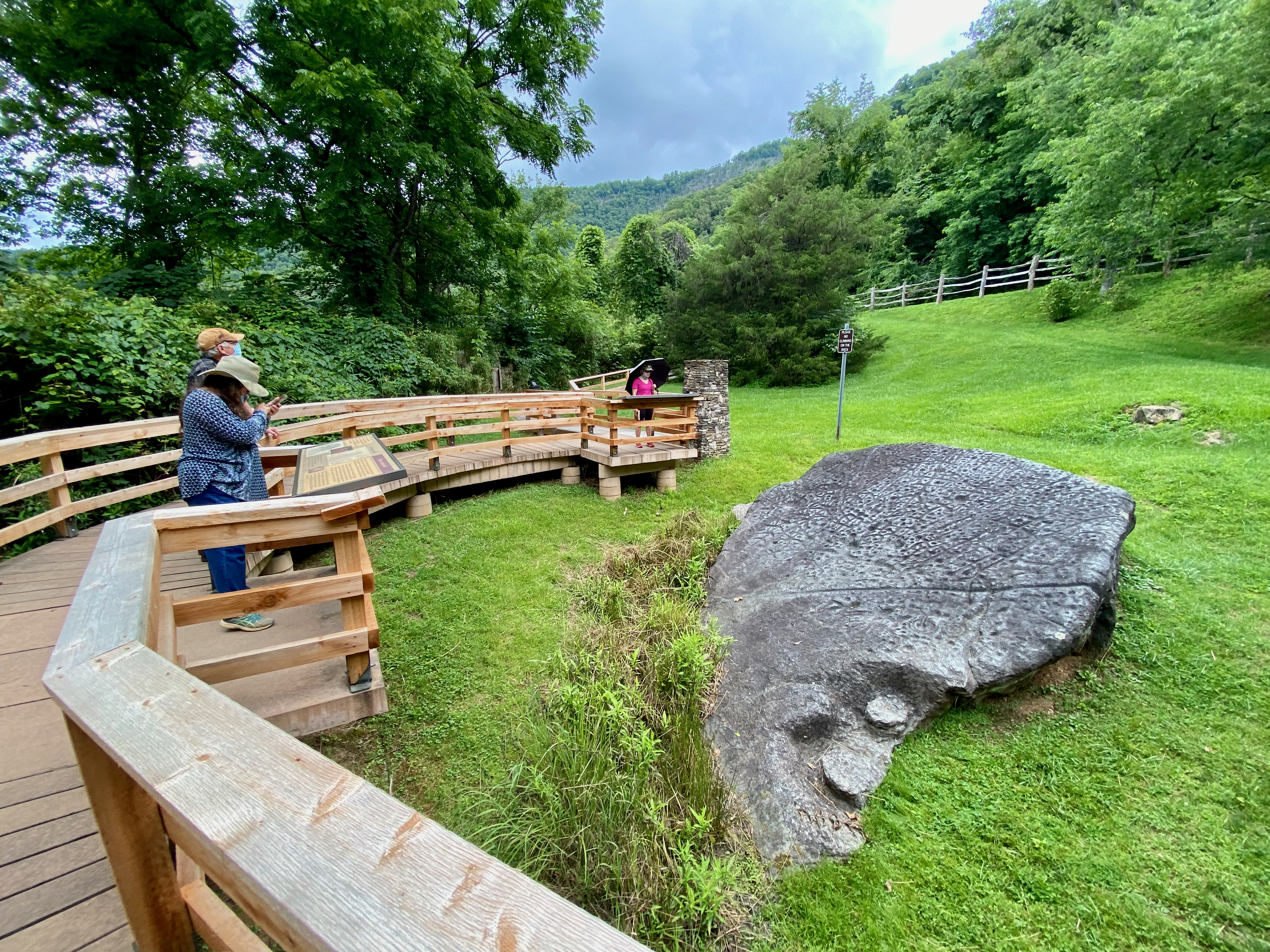
Judaculla Rock visitors on a semicircular viewing platform in 2021

Collaboration in Jackson County among the Parker family, former owners of the property; the North Carolina Rock Art Project, the Eastern Band of Cherokee Indians, Western Carolina University, the North Carolina Department of Cultural Resources, and the Caney Fork Community Council, resulted in the construction of a semicircular, elevated viewing platform at the site, complete with interpretive signs. This proactive conservation and management of Judaculla Rock is an example of how rock art sites in other parts of the country can be preserved, interpreted, and presented on a sustainable basis to the visiting public for generations to come.

In 2013, Judaculla Rock and its site were placed on the National Register of Historic Places.

== See also ==
- List of individual rocks
