= Whiteside Mountain =

Mountain in North Carolina, United States

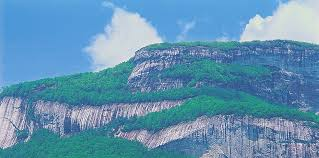
- Whiteside Mountain

Highest point
- Elevation: 4,930 ft (1,500 m)
- Coordinates: 35.0809°N 83.1382°W

Geography
- Location: Jackson County, North Carolina, U.S.
- Parent range: Appalachian Mountains
- Topo map: USGS Highlands

Whiteside Mountain or Sanigilâ'gĭ in Cherokee is a mountain in Jackson County, North Carolina between Cashiers, Highlands, North Carolina, and the Georgia border. Whiteside Mountain has the highest cliffs in Eastern North America. It also has a feature called Devil's Courthouse (distinct from the Devil's Courthouse 20 miles away in Transylvania County, NC).

Since the 1980s, the forest service has tried to restrict access to the Courthouse and has allowed the foot trail to it to grow over because of dangers such as strong winds. They also did not want accidents from paragliding and similar activities taking place from the mountain top or from the Courthouse. There is also an overhang, a small platform less than 7 feet in diameter, connected to Whiteside as if it were a cantilever. Similar overhangs can be found on the Appalachian Trail.

== History ==
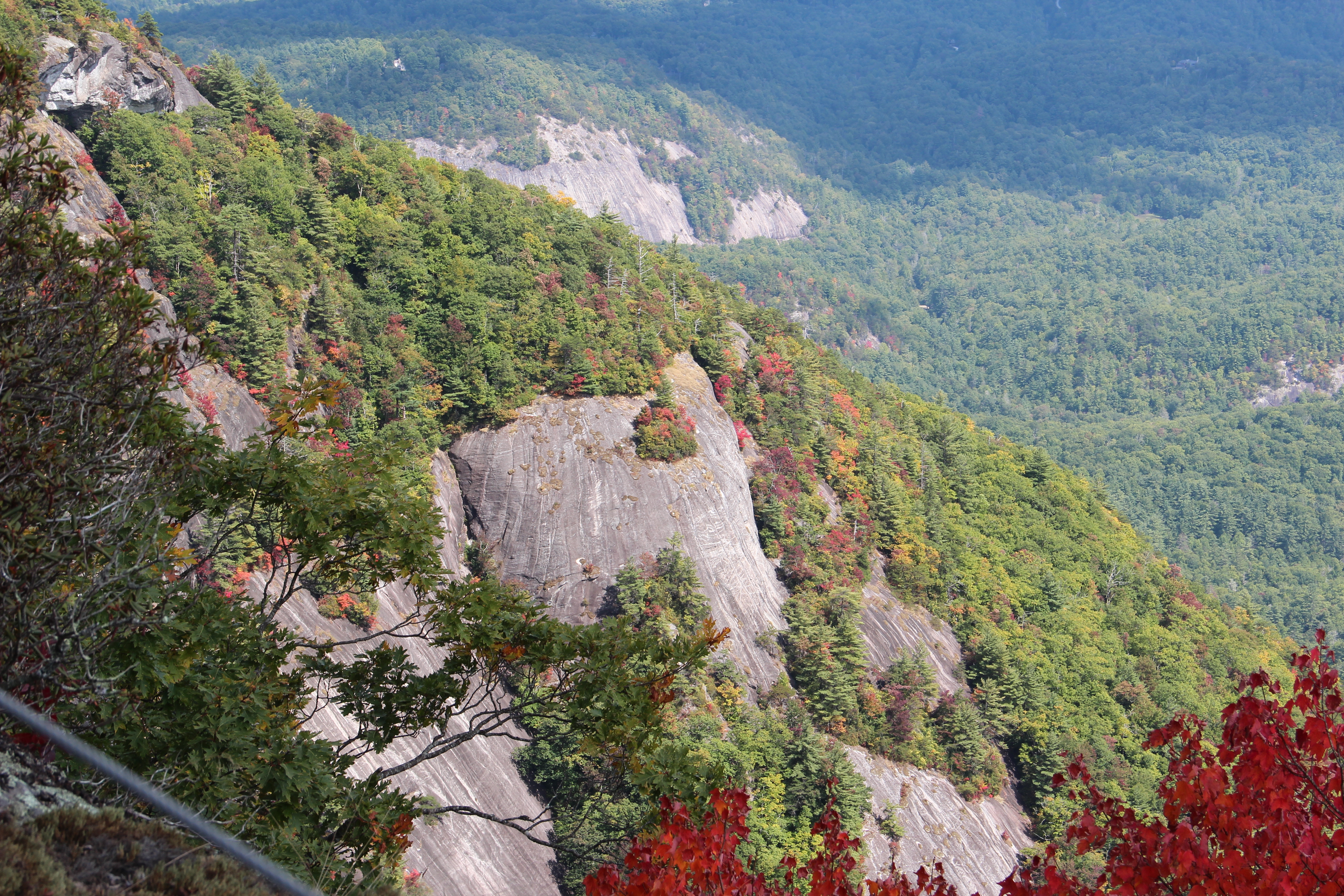
Cliffs on Whiteside Mountain

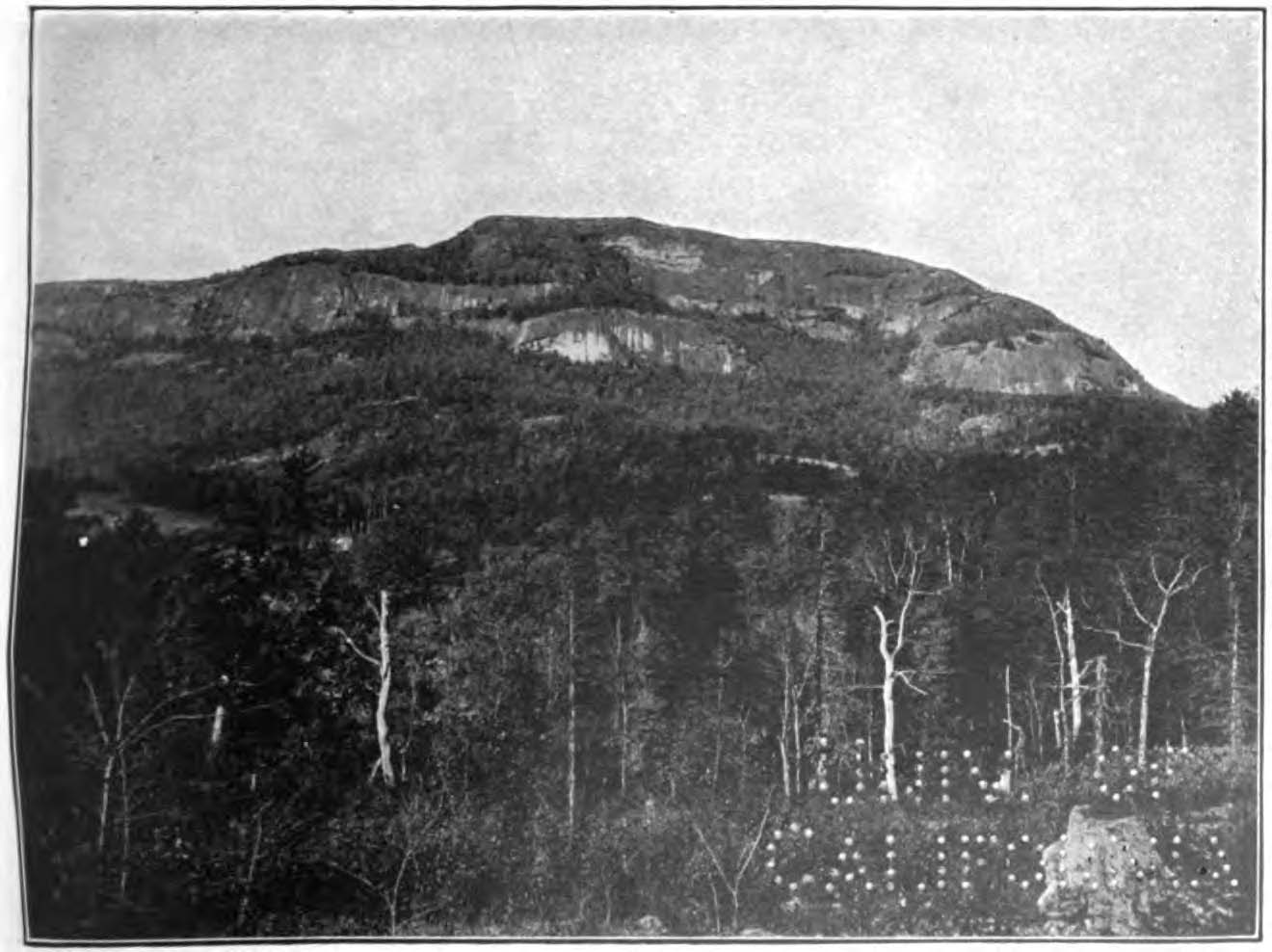
Whiteside Mountain c. 1910

The Cherokee name for Whiteside mountain is Sanigilâ'gĭ.

=== Legend of Spear Finger ===
Cherokee myth says that Spearfinger, the powerful woman monster, built a bridge from the Hiwassee River to Whiteside Mountain.

=== Legend of De Soto ===
The overhanging edge has a message carved into it, which reads that Hernando de Soto was there and that it was carved by his men who allegedly threw over their sick, crippled horses there. However, it is likely a hoax carved by some boys sometime in 1926 when there was probably much more of the overhang than there is today. Since the terrain is too rough for men and horses to get through, for De Soto to have come through here at a time when there were no roads or pathways is unlikely. De Soto's route most likely took him through the Cumberland Gap from South Carolina.

Inscription Update - Nov. 18, 2021 The inscription actually reads, ""T.T." Un luego Santa a la memoria" In 1946, Rev. Herman Miles Alley confessed to carving the engraving. He loved the Spanish language and made the carving during a sad period in his life. He was trying to say, "a memorial to a future saint." While it is unsure which of these stories may be factual, the use of "quotation marks" was not in use at the time DeSoto's ventures.
