= Devil's Courthouse =

Mountain in North Carolina, United States

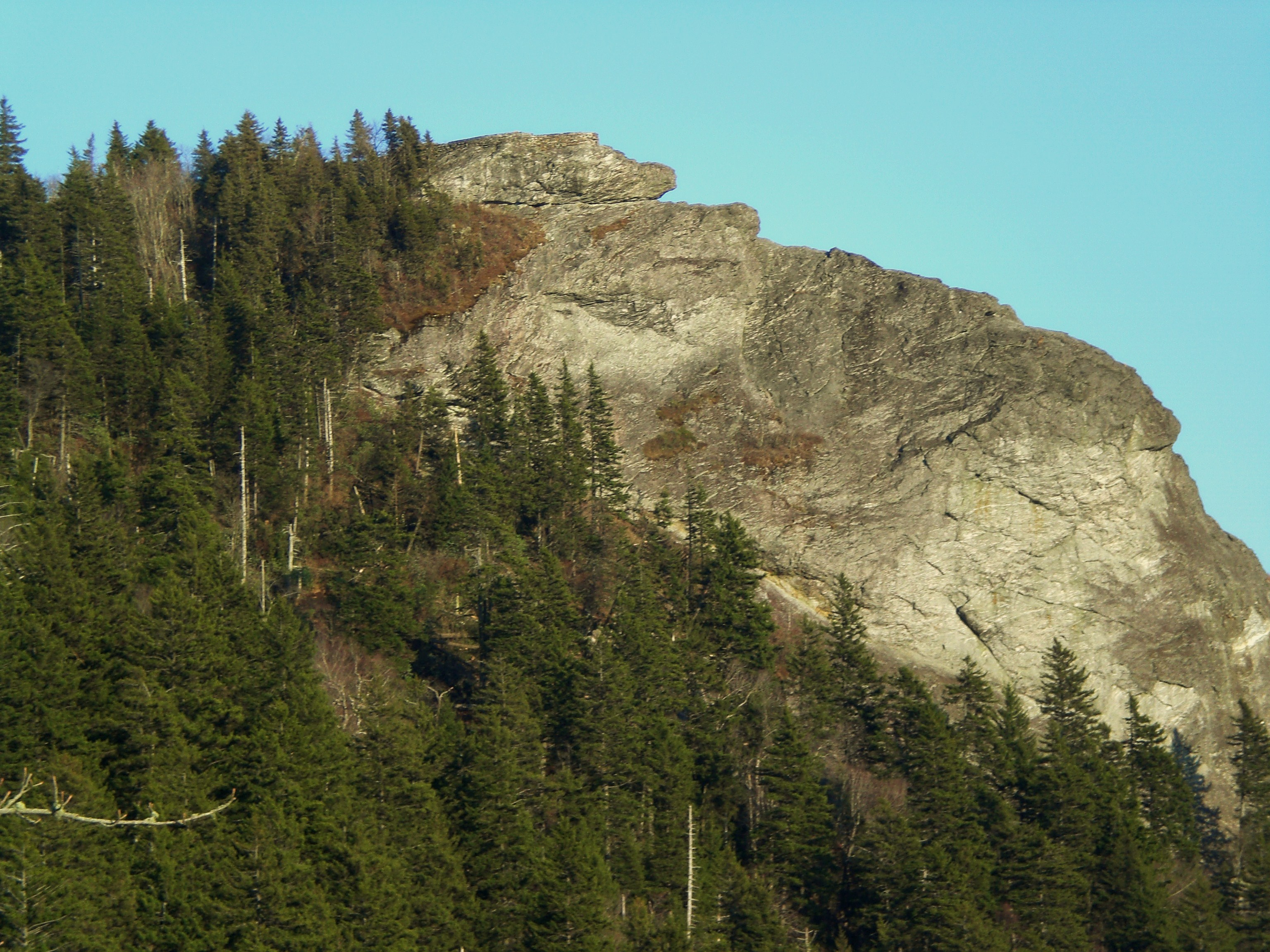

Highest point
- Elevation: 5,720 ft (1,740 m)
- Coordinates: 35°18′9″N 82°53′44″W

Geography
- Location: Transylvania County, North Carolina, U.S.
- Parent range: Appalachian Mountains
- Topo map: USGS Sam Knob

Climbing
- Easiest route: Hike

Devil's Courthouse is a mountain in the Appalachian Mountains of western North Carolina in the United States of America. The mountain is located at the Western edge of the Pisgah National Forest about 10 miles (16 kilometers) northwest of Brevard and 28 miles (45 kilometers) southwest of Asheville. Located at milepost 422.4 (kilometer 679.8 km) of the Blue Ridge Parkway, the Devil's Courthouse has a moderate/strenuous trail climbing a half mile (0.8 kilometers) to its peak where panoramic views can be seen.

View atop Devil's Courthouse looking south. On clear days, four states can be seen: Georgia, South Carolina, Tennessee, and North Carolina.

== Myth of Judaculla ==
Cherokee lore had been reported to state that Jutaculla (alternative English spelling is Judaculla; Cherokee name is Tsul'kălû'), a slant eyed giant, dwells in the cave in Devil's Courthouse. However James Mooney, the Cherokee anthropologist, 100 years earlier located Jutaculla to Tanasee Bald where Haywood, Jackson, and Transylvania counties meet. Tanasee Bald is 1.5 miles (2.4 km) southwest. Unconfirmed rumors state that the Cherokee used the formation as a platform for capital punishment.
