= The Secret Saturdays =

American animated television series

- Also known as: Cryptids
- Genre: Action; Adventure
- Created by: Jay Stephens
- Developed by: Brandon Sawyer; Jay Stephens; Fred Schaefer
- Directed by: Scott Jeralds
- Voices of: Sam Lerner; Phil Morris; Nicole Sullivan; Diedrich Bader; Fred Tatasciore; Will Friedle; Corey Burton
- Composer: Michael Tavera
- Country of origin: United States
- Original language: English
- No. of seasons: 2
- No. of episodes: 36 (list of episodes)

Production
- Executive producers: Bruce D. Johnson; William T. Baumann; Jay Stephens
- Producer: Scott Jeralds
- Running time: 22 minutes
- Production company: PorchLight Entertainment

Original release
- Network: Cartoon Network
- Release: October 3, 2008 – January 30, 2010

Related
- Ben 10 (2005–2021); Generator Rex (2010–2013)

The Secret Saturdays is an American animated television series created by Canadian cartoonist Jay Stephens and produced by PorchLight Entertainment for Cartoon Network. The series ran from October 3, 2008, to January 30, 2010. It follows the adventures of the eponymous family of cryptozoologists that work to keep the truth about cryptids from getting out, to protect both the human race and the creatures themselves. The Saturdays travel the Earth searching for cryptids to study and battling twisted villains like the megalomaniac V. V. Argost. The series is influenced by 1960s-era Hanna-Barbera action series and Jay Stephens's interest in cryptozoology.

== Plot ==
Symbol of Kur

The Secret Saturdays revolves around the eponymous Saturdays, a family of cryptozoologists consisting of parents Doc and Drew Saturday and their 11-year-old son, Zak Saturday. The Saturdays are members of the Secret Scientists, a global organization with the goal of studying and safeguarding sciences considered too dangerous to be general public knowledge. As the foremost experts in cryptids, the Saturdays are responsible for studying and protecting cryptids around the world, while also keeping their existence a secret from the rest of humanity and averting cryptid-related threats. The Saturdays travel in their airship with their cryptid companions Fiskerton, Komodo, and Zon, while the young Zak Saturday strives to help his parents with their missions and to master his mysterious innate ability to influence and control the actions of cryptids.

At the beginning of the series, the Secret Scientists are attacked en masse by V. V. Argost, the masked host of the cryptid-centric television series V. V. Argost's Weird World and a longtime enemy of the Secret Scientists. Argost and his henchmen steal the pieces of the Kur Stone, a Sumerian artifact which can lead its wielder to the location of Kur, an allegedly all-powerful cryptid. In the first season of the show, the Saturdays are also pitted against bounty hunter Leonidas Van Rook and his apprentice, who is later revealed to be Drew's long-lost brother Doyle Blackwell, who was separated from her after their parents died in an accident in the Himalayas. The Saturdays also discover an ancient mirror which leads to a dimension made of antimatter, and encounter their evil counterparts, whom Zak dubs the "Mondays." At the end of the first season, the Saturdays and Argost race to Kur's supposed resting place in Antarctica, only to discover that Kur is actually Zak; when the Kur stone was shattered years ago, Kur's soul entered Zak's unborn body, giving him the ability to influence cryptids.

In the second season, Argost, taking an interest in Zak as the true Kur, bargains with Zak to teach him how to use his powers. Meanwhile, the Secret Scientists have turned against the Saturdays, wishing to capture Zak and place him into cryogenic sleep to prevent him from becoming a serious threat. As Doyle and a reformed Van Rook investigate the origins of V. V. Argost, they discover that Argost is actually a cryptid, the yeti, and was responsible for the murder of Drew and Doyle's parents decades ago. Argost captures Zak and reveals himself as the yeti, then uses the mirror artifact to summon Zak Monday, whose powers he steals, giving him the same powers as Zak and killing Zak Monday in the process. Argost and Zak wage a global cryptid war against each other using their Kur abilities, but Zak ultimately overpowers Argost, forcing him to retreat. After killing Van Rook, Argost captures Zak and tries to absorb his powers in addition to Zak Monday's, but the combination of matter and antimatter destroys Argost and the power of Kur.

== Characters ==
=== Main ===
- Zak Saturday (voiced by Sam Lerner): The son of Doc and Drew Saturday, Zak seeks adventure at every turn, which is easily satisfied by his cryptid-researching family. He has an unorthodox upbringing that has taken him around the planet and placed him in the face of danger since the day he was born. Zak was imbued with Kur's essence prior to his birth, which gives the ability to mentally connect with cryptids.
- Doc Saturday (voiced by Phil Morris): Solomon "Doc" Saturday is the patriarch of the Saturday family and an "Indiana Jones"-like character who has spent his whole life studying cryptids. Doc Saturday naturally had black hair but after a fight with Tsul 'Kalu, Doc was shocked by the claw that originally belonged to Kalu, giving him a streak of white hair and blinding him in his right eye. A man who takes science very seriously, Doc is one of the Earth's leading experts in the field of cryptozoology.
- Drew Saturday (voiced by Nicole Sullivan): Drew Saturday is the matriarch and the one who "believes in magic," being more prone to accepting things on faith rather than empirical evidence. Drew was born to a family of adventurer-scientists. After her family was scattered during a severe blizzard in the Himalaya, she was raised by monks who may have taught her to believe not everything needs a reasonable/scientific explanation. Years later, she was reunited with her long lost brother, Doyle.
- Doyle Blackwell (voiced by Will Friedle): Doyle is Zak's biological uncle, Doc's brother-in-law, and Drew's long-lost younger brother. He first appears as Van Rook's apprentice in "The Kur Stone". In "Van Rook's Apprentice", he changes sides and joins the Saturdays after learning he is Drew's brother and about V.V. Argost's true motives.
- Fiskerton (vocal effects provided by Diedrich Bader): Fiskerton is a seven-foot-tall creature resembling a cross between a gorilla and a cat, based on the Fiskerton Phantom. He was adopted by the Saturday family when his home was burned down in Nottinghamshire, England, with him and Zak developing a sibling-like relationship. He is later be revealed to be a Lemurian.
- Komodo (vocal effects provided by Fred Tatasciore): Komodo is a 250-pound, genetically altered Komodo dragon with a voracious appetite. He can become invisible and make other objects invisible. Though for the most part he is very obedient, Komodo's actions are often dictated by his stomach and he will ignore the family for a good meal. Extending from this, Komodo will often pick fights with others to get food.
- Zon (vocal effects provided by Fred Tatasciore): Zon, named after the Amazon rainforest where she was found, is an Ornithocheirus who lives in a nest near the Saturdays' headquarters. The Saturdays anger her by crashing into her nest during the second episode, but she comes to appreciate them after Zak saves her life. She uses the cliffs where the Saturdays live as her hunting grounds.

=== Supporting ===
- The Secret Scientists: A group of Earth's greatest minds who specialize in various fields.
  - Dr. Arthur Beemman (voiced by Jeff Bennett): A Secret Scientist who studies aliens and UFOs.
  - Dr. Henry Cheveyo (voiced by Diedrich Bader): A Secret Scientist who works at the Mesa Observatory in Arizona.
  - Dr. Miranda Grey (voiced by Susanne Blakeslee): A Secret Scientist who specializes in quantum physics and wields a gun which can create miniature wormholes, allowing her to physically attack opponents from a distance.
    - Deadbolt: A robot who is the sidekick of Dr. Miranda Grey. A running gag is that whenever Deadbolt is destroyed, he is repaired good as new and improved.
  - Dr. Paul Cheechoo (voiced by Danny Cooksey): A Secret Scientist from Canada who specializes in cold-climate research. He is shown to be more friendly to Zak and has a sense of humor.
  - Professor Talu Mizuki (voiced by Jerry Tondo): A scientist who invented a mind-swapping device for crime lord and philanthropist Shoji Fuzen, intending to use the device to give certain people a new body. When Mizuki was asked to use it to implant the mind of one of Fuzen's men into a Hibagon, he took the Hibagon's body himself to prevent Fuzen from obtaining and weaponizing it. In the ensuing confrontation, Mizuki's original body was lost in a fire and the mind-swapping device was destroyed. He attempts to take revenge against Fuzen, but is convinced by Doc to let it go. He now lives in a cave lab alongside his white tiger working on rebuilding the device and joined the Secret Scientists.
    - White Tiger: The unnamed pet of Talu Mizuki, who was implanted with the consciousness of his dog.
  - Dr. Patchecutec (voiced by Candi Milo): A Secret Scientist.
  - Dr. David Bara (voiced by Clancy Brown): A Secret Scientist who owned the Dream-Time Totem.
  - Dr. Odele (voiced by Phil Morris): A Secret Scientist who specializes in anomalous weather.
- Ulraj (voiced by Adam Wylie): The young fish-like prince of Kumari Kandam, whose father was killed in an assault orchestrated by V.V. Argost. With help from the Saturdays, Ulraj reclaims his kingdom.
- Agent Epsilon (voiced by Brian Stepanek): A member of a secret organization that is loosely allied with the Secret Scientists. He and his "son" Francis are clones of a "perfect agent" who their organization found 100 years ago.
  - Francis (voiced by Scott Menville): The "son" of Agent Epsilon.
- The Hassi: A tribe in the Middle East that are allied with the Secret Scientists. They guard the Methuselah Tree, the source of all water on Earth.
  - Maboul (voiced by Diedrich Bader): The chieftain of the Hassi.
  - Wadi (voiced by Liliana Mumy): The kleptomaniac daughter of Maboul.
- Tsul 'Kalu: A skilled cryptid warrior. It was responsible for the scar over Doc Saturday's left eye.

=== Villains ===
- V. V. Argost (voiced by Corey Burton): V. V. Argost is the series' main antagonist and the archenemy of the Saturdays, who seeks to acquire the power of Kur. He is the host of V.V. Argost's Weirdworld, a series that made him "the modern master of the bizarre". Argost is actually a Yeti who previously attacked humans out of enjoyment in the Himalayas and often took items from their camp as souvenirs. One of the 'souvenirs' Argost had taken from a camp he had attacked was a television, from which he learned to speak English. Argost resolved to live among humans by influencing them with a television show of his own.
  - Munya (vocal effects provided by Fred Tatasciore): Argost's butler. He was injected with the DNA of a Papuan giant spider, giving him the ability to transform into a humanoid spider monster.
- Leonidas Van Rook (voiced by Corey Burton): Leonidas Van Rook is a ruthless cryptozoologist who is an ally of V.V. Argost and a rival of Doc Saturday. Van Rook is interested in proving the existence of cryptids for money. He is very thrifty, almost to a fault. Similar to Doc, he is an inventor and has many high-tech gadgets. During the final season, Van Rook assists the Saturday family. During the family's final battle against Argost, Van Rook is killed taking an attack that was meant for Drew.
- Shoji Fuzen (voiced by James Sie): Shoji Fuzen is a Japanese philanthropist and crime lord.
- Pietro "Piecemeal" Maltese (voiced by Jess Harnell): A criminally-insane chef with an appetite for rare animals. Piecemeal has a surgically modified jaw made of four metal flaps which can bite through almost anything. He has above-average strength and durability.
- Baron Finster: Baron Finster is a cyborg with a mechanical scorpion body and tail for legs and an enemy of Doyle.
- Eterno (voiced by Fred Tatasciore): Eterno was once an ancient warrior king with an unquenchable thirst for conquest. His attempt to find the Methuselah Tree, the source of all water on Earth, led to him being entombed in salt by the tree's protectors and transformed into a humanoid salt monster with the ability to turn anything he touches into salt and regenerate his body. In the present day, Eterno resurfaces in the Middle East, turning major water sources into salt. After Zak and Wadi recover sap from the Methuselah Tree, Eterno takes some of it for himself to end his thirst, disintegrating his body.
- The Mondays: The Mondays are the Saturdays' evil antimatter duplicates from a parallel universe, summoned by the Smoke Mirror of Tezcatlipoca. They are not well liked in their reality, most likely being criminals. Each Monday has a distinguishing characteristic that sets them apart from the Saturdays, and cause reality to warp when in the presence of their duplicates. The name Monday was given to them by Zak Saturday since, according to him, his double is a "less fun version of a Saturday", hence a Monday.
  - Zak Monday (voiced by Sam Lerner): His hair color reversed from Zak Saturday's along with his eyes glowing green when using his power with his Fang weapon. Zak Monday possesses the Anti-Kur power and uses it to drive cryptids insane rather than calming them.
  - Doc Monday (voiced by Phil Morris): Solomon "Doc" Monday's scarred eye is on the opposite side and he wears an eye patch over it. He usually speaks in incoherent babbling and has a much lower intellect than his counterpart.
  - Drew Monday (voiced by Nicole Sullivan): Drew Monday has a long, prehensile tongue, but is otherwise similar to her counterpart. She is more rationally scientific than her counterpart.
  - Fiskerton Monday (vocal effects provided by Diedrich Bader): Fiskerton Monday has horns in place of ears and is much more vicious than his counterpart.
  - Komodo Monday (voiced by Fred Tatasciore): Komodo Monday is capable of human speech and seems to be the leader of the group when they are not fighting amongst themselves. He possesses black spots on his back which he can expand to cover his entire body and harden his skin.
  - Zon Monday (vocal effects provided by Fred Tatasciore): Zon Monday has eye-like patterns on her wings, but otherwise behaves almost exactly like Zon Saturday.
- Dr. Lee (voiced by Diedrich Bader): A villainous scientist who was a colleague of Basil Lancaster and young Doc Saturday in a project to create cryptids in Honey Island Swamp. When the project went out of control, Lancaster betrayed him and the other three scientists by destroying enough of their research to cripple the project, saved the cryptids, and fled into the bayou. Years later, they lure the Saturdays to Honey Island Swamp and make Doc restart the project. However, after learning the truth, the Saturdays manage to defeat and arrest Lee and his accomplices.
- Rani Nagi (voiced by Susanne Blakeslee): The four-armed Queen of the Nāgas.
- Abbey Grey (voiced by Kari Wahlgren): Once Zak's babysitter, Abbey Grey is an ancient civilization expert and Miranda Grey's sister who would later go rogue and become a mercenary.

=== Cryptids ===
The following cryptids whether they are notable or fictional appear in this show in order of appearance:

- Amarok (vocal effects provided by Fred Tatasciore): A wolf cryptid.
- Cherufe: In this show, the Cherufe is a humanoid lizard.
- Owlman: A humanoid owl cryptid who is worshiped by a cult in Southern Cornwall, England.
- Atomospheric Jellyfish: A race of jellyfish that move around in the atmosphere.
- Rakshasa: In this show, the Rakshasha is a large purple shapeshifting cat-like creature.
- Duah - A pterosaur cryptid.
- The Swamp Cryptids: A group of artificial cryptids created by Basil Lancester, whom they remain loyal to even after his death. They initially attack the Saturdays, but ultimately help them after revealing that they were working to destroy the project that created them.
  - Bardin Booger: The Bardin Booger is a Bigfoot-like creature.
  - Devil Monkey: The Devil Monkey is a monkey-like creature with horns.
  - Fouke Monster: The Fouke Monster is a Bigfoot-like cryptid.
  - Georgia Pigman (vocal effects provided by Dee Bradley Baker): The Georgia Pigman is a pig-headed ape-like creature.
  - Green Goon: The Green Goon is an ape-like creature.
  - Hawley Him: The Hawley Him is a black-furred Bigfoot-like creature.
  - Honey Island Swamp monster (vocal effects provided by Dee Bradley Baker): In this show, the Honey Island Swamp Monster is a Bigfoot-like creature with a monkey-like head, crocodilia feet, and crab-like claws.
  - Kinchafoonee Creep: The Kinchafoonee Creep is a bat-headed creature with wild boar-like tusks.
  - Lake Worth Monster: The Lake Worth Monster is a hairy creature that has the head and hooves of a goat. It was the one who showed Doc and Drew the message from Dr. Lancaster and helped to intimidate Dr. Lee and his colleagues into undoing the fusion done to Zak, Fiskerton, and Komodo.
  - Bishopville Lizard Man: A reptilian humanoid. In this show, the Bishopville Lizard Man has acid-spitting abilities.
  - Man Cat: The Man Cat is a Bigfoot/black panther-like creature.
  - Mississippi Swamp Ape: The Mississippi Swamp Ape is a "bearded" Bigfoot-like creature.
  - Momo the Monster: A Bigfoot-like creature with hair covering most of its face.
- Grootslang: In this show, the Grootslang is a four-tusked elephant cryptid with horns and a spiked tail.
- Lau: A large catfish-like Cryptid.
- Maltese tiger: A cryptid that resembles a blue South China tiger.
- Allegewi (vocal effects provided by Fred Tatasciore): A large cryptid.
- Ahuizotl (vocal effects provided by Fred Tatasciore): In this show, the Ahuizotl resembles a humanoid creature with a hand on its tail.
- Bunyip (vocal effects provided by Dee Bradley Baker): In this show, the Bunyips are depicted as gremlin-like creatures.
- Lake Van Monster: In this show, the Lake Van Monster resembles a Mosasaurus-like creature.

== Episodes ==
Season	Episodes	Originally released	
Season	Episodes	First released	Last released
1	26	October 3, 2008	August 1, 2009
2	10	November 7, 2009	January 30, 2010
T.G.I.S.		October 5, 2013	

== Development and production ==
When Stephens first pitched the show, it was called Cryptids, after the undiscovered scientific monsters. It involved a team of globe-trotting cryptozoologists that were uniquely qualified for the job because they were once cryptids themselves. Okapi, Komodo, and Megamouth, along with their 9-year-old human mascot, Francis, served as a sort of anti-detective team. They scooted across land, sea, and air in what Stephens called a Campercopter and their goal was to preserve the mystery of the Earth's strangest creatures before they were exposed by humans or destroyed by the cryptids' nemesis, Monsieur Dodo. This version got him nowhere with many networks, though they all did show interest for some time.

Months later, the show was picked up by Cartoon Network, due to the network wanting more action shows at the time due to the success of Ben 10 and Ben 10: Alien Force. 9-year-old Francis became 11-year-old Zak Saturday and many of the original characters were deleted. For a time, the network wanted the show's name to be The Secret Adventures Of Zak Saturday, but it was later changed. Unlike most mystery shows, the goal of the heroes of The Secret Saturdays is not to reveal the existence of cryptids, but to hide it. The art style of the show was influenced by the artwork of Alex Toth and 1960s Hanna-Barbera action cartoons, such as Jonny Quest and The Herculoids. Michael Tavera created the music score for the show after finishing his work on Time Squad, ¡Mucha Lucha!, Lilo & Stitch: The Series, and Yin Yang Yo!.

In July 2008, Cartoon Network started a viral campaign for the show. Several commercials for a website called CryptidsAreReal.com aired on Cartoon Network. Each commercial featured a pet of the Saturday family: one showed Komodo, another Fiskerton, and a final one showed Zon. One area of the program's website also held a "secret" document: while most of the words on it were blackedout, the names of Drew and Doc (two of the main characters) were revealed. The document also talked about a creature discovered outside of Nottinghamshire, England. Though the first word was blacked-out, the paper said a "phantom" had been the newly discovered creature. It was implied that the creature was the Fiskerton Phantom, a cryptid reported to have lived outside of Nottinghamshire and commonly done by this website, would be Fiskerton, a main character in the show. To back this conclusion up, Zak stated in one episode that Fiskerton was lucky because Doc and Drew saved him, which was also stated in the document. Typed at the bottom of the document was the name "Agent Epsilon", a character in the show. The website also showed a blueprint of the Saturdays family's airship. Another site was linked to CryptidsAreReal.com: the page for an organization called Ten Hero Tusk (an anagram of "the Kur stone"), which states that its explorers are "D. Blackwell, B. Finster, and L. Van Rook", all of which are characters in the show. During San Diego Comic-Con 2008, booklets about a show called Weirdworld (the show-within-a-show) were given out, with the website for it on the back of them. Unlike CryptidsAreReal.com, this one could not be traced back to Cartoon Network. Later, commercials for Weirdworld aired on Cartoon Network for a few weeks before a commercial for The Secret Saturdays itself was aired on October 3, 2008.

== Merchandise ==
A DVD featuring the first five episodes of the series (along with bonus features such as animatics) was released on July 21, 2009. A second DVD with similar features was released on October 27, 2009. An encyclopedia entitled The Secret Saturdays: The Official Cryptid Field Guide was released on August 11, 2009. Graphic novels and chapter books were released by Del Ray Manga in the summer of 2009. A video game called The Secret Saturdays: Beasts of the 5th Sun was released by D3 Publisher for the PlayStation 2, PlayStation Portable, Nintendo DS and Wii on October 20, 2009. Comic adventures of The Secret Saturdays appeared semi-monthly between 2008 and 2010 as part of Cartoon Network Action Pack comic books published by DC Comics. A line of action figures and playsets was released by Mattel. One of the toys made by Mattel, the Secret Saturdays Fire Sword, received some controversy for the loudness of the toy, which could reach up to 121 dBs.

== In other media ==
- The Saturday family appear in the Ben 10: Omniverse episode "T.G.I.S.", where they team up with Ben Tennyson and Rook Blonko to stop Ben's enemy Dr. Animo, who has resurrected V. V. Argost in a chimeric form with features of other cryptids. Drew Saturday later makes a cameo appearance in "The Most Dangerous Game Show".
- Zak Saturday makes a cameo appearance in the OK K.O.! Let's Be Heroes episode "Thank You for Watching the Show".
