= Nun'Yunu'Wi =

Being of Cherokee mythology

The Nun'Yunu'Wi (Cherokee: "dressed in stone"; also known as Stone Coat) is a being of Cherokee mythology. Nun'Yunu'Wi is described as a human-like being with a skin as hard as stone, which no weapon can pierce. It carries a magical cane which points out victims and has other magical powers. It is described as a powerful sorcerer or medicine man. It devours human beings, interacts with spirits, and can control people's minds.

According to the myth, the Nun'Yunu'Wi was led by its cane to a village. However, the village was warned by a hunter who spotted the creature in the mountains. The medicine man warned the villagers that, though the monster would be very difficult to kill with weapons, it could not bear the sight of a menstruating woman. So seven such women were assembled and placed in front of the village. After the monster had seen them all, it was weakened so much that it could not move. The medicine man then burned the creature, and its remains contained a great jewel and lumps of red paint.
