= Cherokee spiritual beliefs =

Spiritual beliefs of the Cherokee people

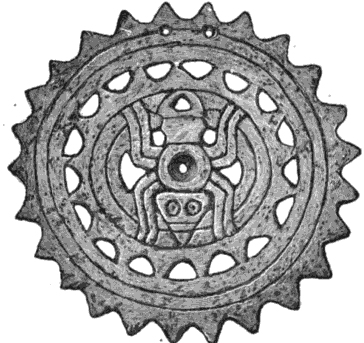
ᏗᎵᏍᏙᏗ "dilsdohdi" the "water spider" is said to have first brought fire to the inhabitants of the earth in the basket on her back.

Cherokee spiritual beliefs are held in common among the Cherokee people – Native American peoples who are Indigenous to the Southeastern Woodlands, and today live primarily in communities in North Carolina (the Eastern Band of Cherokee Indians), and Oklahoma (the Cherokee Nation and United Keetoowah Band of Cherokee Indians). Some of the beliefs, and the stories and songs in which they have been preserved, exist in slightly different forms in the different communities in which they have been preserved. But for the most part, they still form a unified system of theology.

== Principal beliefs ==
To the traditional Cherokee, spirituality is woven into the fabric of everyday life. The physical world is not separated from the spiritual world. They are one and the same. In her book Cherokee Women: Gender and Culture Change, 1700–1835, historian Theda Perdue wrote of the Cherokee's historical beliefs:

"The Cherokee did not separate spiritual and physical realms but regarded them as one, and they practiced their religion in a host of private daily observances as well as in public ceremonies."

Cherokee cosmology traditionally includes a conception of the universe being composed of three distinct but connected worlds: the Upper World and the Under World, which are the domains of the spirits, and This World, where humans live.

Unlike some other religions, in the Cherokee belief system, humans do not rule or have dominion over the earth, plants or animals. Instead, humans live in coexistence with all of creation. Humans mediate between all worlds in an attempt to maintain balance between them. Plants, animals, and other features of the natural world such as rivers, mountains, caves and other formations on the earth all have spiritual powers and attributes. Theda Perdue and Michael Green write in their book The Columbia Guide to American Indians of the Southeast,

"These features served as mnemonic devices to remind them of the beginning of the world, the spiritual forces that inhabited it, and their responsibilities to it."

Perdue also outlines the ways that Cherokee culture persisted through multiple attempts by Christian missionaries to convert them. Their strong ties to Selu, the corn mother in their creation story, put women in a position of power in their communities as harvesters of corn, a role they did not give up easily.

=== Sacred fire ===
Fire is important in traditional Cherokee beliefs, as well as in other Indigenous cultures of the Southeastern United States. In his book Where the Lightning Strikes: The Lives of American Indian Sacred Places, anthropologist Peter Nabokov writes:

"Fire was the medium of transformation, turning offerings into gifts for spiritual intercessors for the four quarters of the earth."

From The Cherokee People by T.Mails, the sacred fire was a special gift to the Cherokee people and in their dance around that blessed fire they would become united as one mind.

=== Balance ===
To the traditional Cherokee, the concept of balance is central in all aspects of social and ceremonial life. In Cherokee Women: Gender and Culture Change, 1700–1835, Theda Perdue writes:

"In this belief system, women balanced men just as summer balanced winter, plants balanced animals, and farming balanced hunting."

=== Sickness and healing ===
Author John Reid, in his book titled A Law of Blood: The Primitive Law of the Cherokee Nation, writes:

"All human diseases were imposed by animals in revenge for killing and each species had invented a disease with which to plague man."

According to Reid, some believed animal spirits who had been treated badly could retaliate by sending bad dreams to the hunter. These would cause the hunter to lose their appetite, become sick and die. To prevent this from happening the hunter must follow traditional protocols when hunting, to honor the animal and spiritual world and continually maintain balance.

=== Purity and sacred places ===
Ritual purification is traditionally important for ceremonial and ongoing spiritual balance. Bathing in rivers, year-round, is one traditional method, even in the winter when ice is on the river. Anthropologist Peter Nabokov writes of a river known as "Long Man":

"For the Cherokee who bathed in his body, who drank from him and invoked his curative powers, the Long Man always helped them out."

He went on to say:

"At every critical turn in a man's life, the river's blessings were imparted through the 'going to the water' rite, which required prayers that were lent spiritual force with 'new water' from free-flowing streams."

== Creation beliefs ==
The first people were a brother and sister. Once, the brother hit his sister with a fish and told her to multiply. Following this, she gave birth to a child every seven days and soon there were too many people, so women were forced to have just one child every year.

=== The Story of Corn and Medicine ===
The Story of Corn and Medicine begins with the creation of the earth and animals. Earth began as a soft, muddy island, suspended by cords from Galun'lati, a world of solid rock.

Earth became solid land. Animals began exploring the earth, and it was the Buzzard that created valleys and mountains in the Cherokee land by the flapping of his wings. After some time, the earth became habitable for the animals, once the mud of the earth had dried and the sun had been raised up for light.

According to the Cherokee medicine ceremony, the animals and plants had to stay awake for seven nights. The reasons were not well known. Only the owl, panther, bat, and unnamed others were able to fulfill the requirements of the ceremony, so these animals were given the gift of night vision, which allowed them to hunt easily at night. Similarly, the only trees able to remain awake for the seven days were the cedar, pine, spruce, holly, laurel, and oak. These trees were given the gift of staying green year-round.

The first woman argued with the first man and left their home. The first man, helped by the sun, tried tempting her with blueberries and blackberries to return, but was unsuccessful. He finally persuaded her to return by giving to her strawberries.

Humans began to hunt animals and quickly grew in numbers. The population grew so rapidly that a rule was established that women can only have one child per year. Two early humans, a man and his wife, were Kanáti and Selu. Their names meant "The Lucky Hunter" and "Corn", respectively. Kanáti would hunt and bring an animal home for Selu to prepare. Kanáti and Selu had a child, and their child befriended another boy who had been created out of the blood of the slaughtered animals. The family treated this boy like one of their own, except they called him "The Wild Boy". Kanáti consistently brought animals home when he went hunting, and one day, the boys decided to secretly follow him. They discovered that Kanáti would move a rock concealing a cave, and an animal would come out of the cave only to be killed by Kanáti. The boys secretly returned to the rock and opened the entrance to the cave. The boys didn't realize that when the cave was opened many different animals escaped.

Kanáti saw the animals and realized what must have happened. He journeyed to the cave and sent the boys home so he could try to catch some of the escaped animals for eating. This explains why people must hunt for food now.

The boys returned to Selu, who went to get food from the storehouse. She instructed the boys to wait behind while she was gone, but they disobeyed and followed her. They discovered Selu's secret, which was that she would rub her stomach to fill baskets with corn, and she would rub her sides to fill baskets with beans.

Selu knew her secret was out and made the boys one last meal. She and Kanáti then explained to the boys that the two of them would die because their secrets had been discovered. Along with Kanáti and Selu dying, the easy life the boys had become accustomed to would also die. However, if the boys dragged Selu's body seven times outside a circle, and then seven times over the soil within the circle, a crop of corn would appear in the morning if the boys stayed up all night to watch. The boys did not fulfill the instructions completely, which is why corn can only grow in certain places around the earth. Today, corn is still grown, but it does not come overnight.

During the early times, the plants, animals, and people all lived together as friends, but the dramatic population growth of humans crowded the earth, leaving the animals with no room to roam. Humans also would kill the animals for meat or trample them for being in the way. As a punishment for these horrendous acts, the animals created diseases to infect the humans.

Like other creatures, the plants decided to meet, and they came to the conclusion that the animals' actions had to be too harsh and that they would provide a cure for every disease. This explains why all kinds of plant life help to cure many varieties of diseases. Medicine was created in order to counteract the animals' punishments.

=== The Thunder beings ===
The Cherokee believe that there is the Great Thunder and his sons, the two Thunder Boys, who live in the land of the west above the sky vault. They dress in lightning and rainbows. The priests pray to the thunder and he visits the people to bring rain and blessings from the South. It was believed that the thunder beings who lived close to the Earth's surface in the cliffs, mountains, and waterfalls could harm the people at times, which did happen. These other thunders are always plotting mischief.

=== Medicine and disease ===
It is said that all plants, animals, beasts and people once lived in harmony with no separation between them. At this time, the animals were bigger and stronger until the humans became more powerful. When the human population increased, so did the weapons, and the animals no longer felt safe. The animals decided to hold a meeting to discuss what should be done to protect themselves.

The Bears met first and decided that they would make their own weapons like the humans, but this only led to further chaos. Next the Deer gathered to discuss their plan of action and they came to the conclusion that if a hunter was to kill a Deer, they would develop a disease. The only way to avoid this disease was to ask the Deer's spirit for forgiveness. Another requirement was that the people only kill when necessary. The council of Birds, Insects and small animals met next and they decided that humans were too cruel, therefore they concocted many diseases to infect them with.

The plants heard what the animals were planning and since they were always friendly with the humans, they vowed that for every disease made by the animals, they would create a cure. Every plant serves a purpose and the only way to find the purpose is to discover it for yourself. When a medicine man does not know what medicine to use, the spirits of the plants instruct him.

=== Origins of fire ===
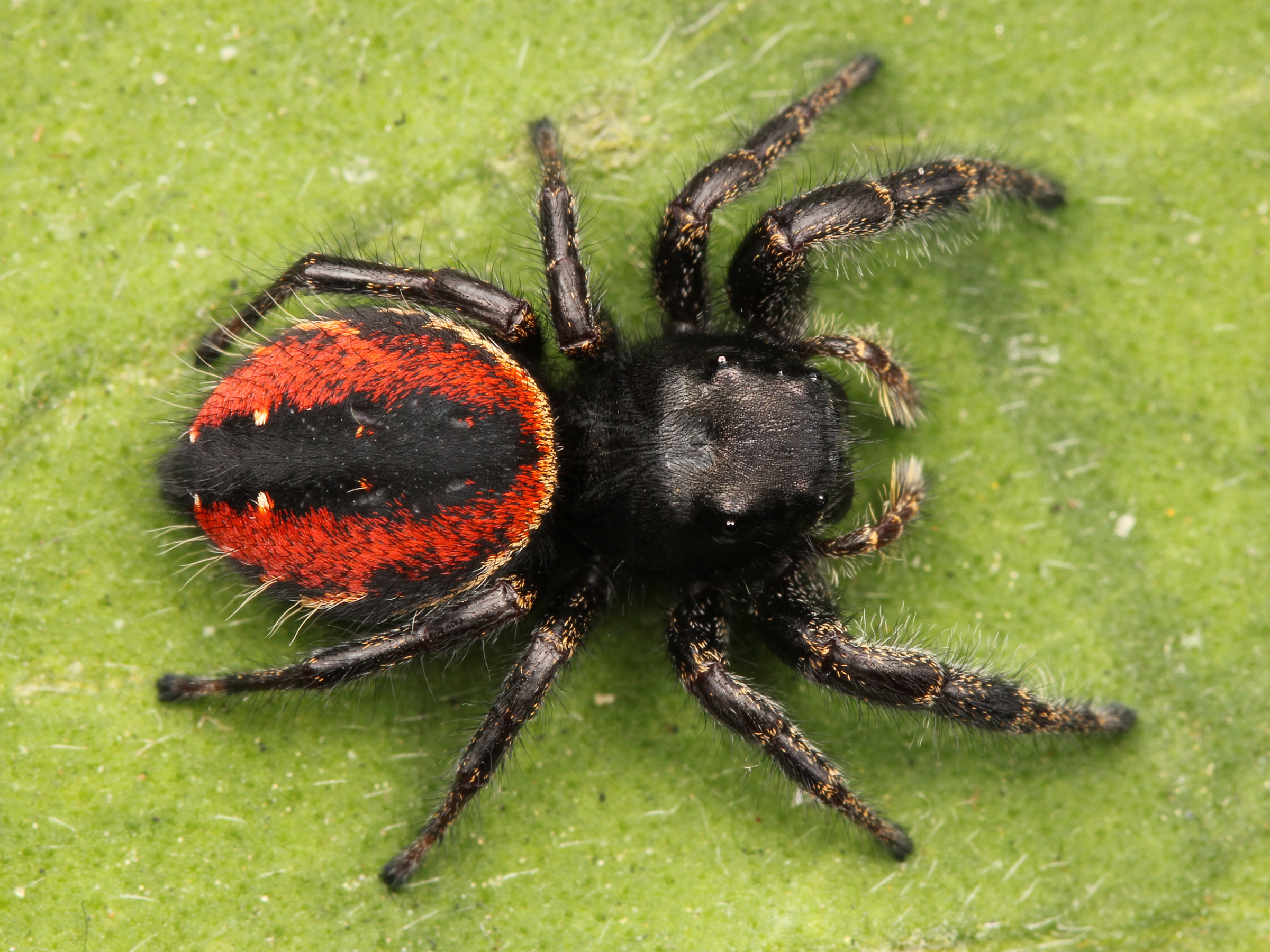
Phidippus johnsoni (female), the spider species which likely inspired the conception of the fire-bringing being Dilsdohdi of Cherokee mythology

Fire is a very important tool in everyday use. The first written account of the Cherokee fire origin story was recorded by the Westerner James Mooney. This appears to be when the spider heroine was first named "Water Spider." However the Cherokee story teller made sure to also describe the spider: "This is not the water spider that looks like a mosquito, but the other one, with black downy hair and red stripes on her body." Modern Cherokee language forums agree the character's actual name is ᏗᎵᏍᏙᏗ "dilsdohdi" or a derivation of that word, which means scissors or scissoring action referring to the motion this stocky spider is able to use to move across water. Phidippus johnsoni, the red-backed jumping spider is most likely the actual spider who inspired the character in this Cherokee legend as it is endemic to the original Cherokee homelands and has the body features and colors described in the legends as well as the ancient bone etchings of the character.)

== Unetlanvhi ==
The Cherokee revere the Great Spirit Unetlanvhi (ᎤᏁᏝᏅᎯ "Creator"), who presides over all things and created the Earth. The Unetlanvhi is omnipotent, omnipresent, and omniscient, and is said to have made the earth to provide for its children, and should be of equal power to Dâyuni'sï, the Water Beetle. The Wahnenauhi Manuscript adds that God is Unahlahnauhi (ᎤᏀᎳᎿᎤᎯ "Maker of All Things") and Kalvlvtiahi (ᎧᎸᎸᏘᎠᎯ "The One Who Lives Above"). In most oral and written Cherokee theology the Great Spirit is not personified as having human characteristics or a physical human form.

=== Other venerated spirits ===
- Uktena (ᎤᎧᏖᎾ): A horned serpent
- Tlanuwa (ᏝᏄᏩ): A giant raptor

== Signs, visions, and dreams ==
The Cherokee traditionally hold that signs, visions, dreams, and powers are all gifts of the spirits, and that the world of humans and the world of the spirits are intertwined, with the spirit world and presiding over both.

Spiritual beings can come in the form of animal or human and are considered a part of daily life. A group of spiritual beings are spoken about as Little People and they can only be seen by humans when they want to be seen. It is said that they choose who they present themselves to and appear as any other Cherokee would, except that they are small with very long hair. The Little People can be helpful but one should be cautious while interacting with them because they can be very deceptive. It is not common to talk about an experience one has with the Little People. Instead, one might relay an incident that happened to someone else. It is said that if you bother the Little People too often you will become confused in your day-to-day life. Although they possess healing powers and helpful hints, the Little People are not to be disturbed.

== Evil ==
Traditionally there is no universal evil spirit in Cherokee theology.

An Asgina (ᎠᏍᎩᎾ) is any sort of spirit, but it is usually considered to be a malevolent one.

Kalona Ayeliski (ᎪᎳᏅ ᎠᏰᎵᏍᎩ "Raven Mockers") are spirits who prey on the souls of the dying and torment their victims until they die, after which they eat the hearts of their victims. Kalona Ayeliski are invisible, except to a medicine man, and the only way to protect a potential victim is to have a medicine man who knows how to drive Kalona Ayeliski off, since they are scared of him.

U'tlun'ta (ᎤᏢᏔ "Spearfinger") is a monster and witch said to live along the eastern side of Tennessee and western part of North Carolina. She has a sharp forefinger on her right hand, which resembles a spear or obsidian knife, which she uses to cut her victims. Her mouth is stained with blood from the livers she has eaten. She is also known as Nûñ'yunu'ï, which means "Stone-dress", for her stone-like skin.

Uya (ᎤᏯ), sometimes called Uyaga (ᎤᏯᎦ), is an evil earth spirit which is invariably opposed to the forces of right and light.
