= Spearfinger =

Figure in Cherokee legend

Spearfinger, or U'tlun'ta', is a monster and witch in Cherokee legend, said to live along the eastern side of Tennessee and western part of North Carolina. U'tlun'ta is Cherokee for "the one with the pointed spear”. Her right forefinger resembles a spear or obsidian knife, which she uses to cut her victims. Her mouth is stained with blood from the livers she has eaten. She is also known as Nûñ'yunu'ï, which means "Stone-dress", for her stone-like skin. Often she clutches her right hand tightly, because she is hiding her heart and her only weak spot, which is her right palm.

Spearfinger, being made of stone, sounds like thunder when she walks, crushing rocks into the ground when she steps on them. Her voice echoes down the mountains to the Cherokee villages and scares the birds of the forest away, which the people have traditionally seen as a warning sign.

In Tennessee, Spearfinger is believed to enjoy walking the trail that joins Chilhowee Mountain and the nearby Little Tennessee River. She is said to have also walked throughout the mountain range, around streams, and through shadowy Nantahala River passes. The Cherokee say her favorite home is Whiteside, a thunder mountain.

Dancing in clouds, she sang her favorite song with her raven friend:

Uwe la na tsiku. Su sa sai.

Liver, I eat it. Su sa sai.

Uwe la na tsiku. Su sa sai.

== Powers ==
Besides a spear for a finger, she shapeshifts into family members of her child victims. Once she has made herself a part of her victim's world, she lacks the ability to change her form while still in anyone else's sight. Spearfinger often disguises herself in the form of "a harmless old lady", as in the story, "U`tlûñ'ta, The Spear-finger".

Since she is made from stone, arrows cannot pierce her skin. They shatter when they hit her. Furthermore, she can pick up boulders effortlessly, stack them, break them, and morph them together.

== Her stone structure ==
It is said that Spearfinger was formed from stones of the Chillhowee mountains. In her natural form, Spearfinger is described as an old woman with blood stains around her mouth.

Once, Spearfinger undertook to build a "great rock bridge through the air from Nûñyû'-tlu`gûñ'yï, the 'Tree rock', on Hiwassee, over to Sanigilâ'gï," which is Whiteside Mountain located on the Blue Ridge. This structure irritated the Higher Beings because it came too close to their Upper World. Higher Beings saw her effort as arrogant "like man's Bible story of Babel", so they struck it with lightning.

In the nineteenth century, Cherokee pointed out the location where they claim the ruins of Spearfinger's "Tree Rock" remain even today. They named the area along the mountain "Hiawassee" and valley "Nantahala". The site of these remains in Blount County is called "U'Tluntun'yi", which means "The Spearfinger Place".

== Her enemy - Stone Man ==
Another mountain legend concerning stone beings tells of Nun'Yunu'Wi/Stone Man. When Stone Man and Spearfinger pass each other, they sense their relation. Cherokee legend says the stone beings know they are enemies because they hunt the same food – livers. Spearfinger recognises the other figure to be a man because he sings his song about livers in a lower voice that shakes the ground.

Instead of needing to lift stones to build, Stone Man possesses stronger powers than Spearfinger. He simply uses his staff to create bridges to other mountains.

== Stories and customs ==
In autumn, Cherokee peoples have traditionally burned brush fires. These brush fires have covered entire mountainsides so that the Cherokee could easily hunt the fallen, roasted chestnuts. Spearfinger is known for being attracted to these fires. In other seasons, Spearfinger searches for the clouds of smoke that rise from the valley. Sometimes she has caught victims when they wandered for a drink at a stream or picked strawberries near the village.

Her most dangerous attribute is deception - appearing harmless and trustworthy, hiding her identity and powers while luring unsuspecting children. As in the story, "U`tlûñ'ta, The Spear-finger":

Sometimes an old woman would approach along the trail where the children were picking strawberries or playing near the village, and would say to them coaxingly, "Come, my grandchildren, come to your granny and let granny dress your hair." When some little girl ran up and laid her head in the old woman's lap to be petted and combed the old witch would gently run her fingers through the child's hair until it went to sleep, when she would stab the little one through the heart or back of the neck with the long awl finger, which she had kept hidden under her robe. Then she would take out the liver and eat it.

The Cherokee have traditionally been very cautious about strangers, and were suspicious of those who wandered off alone. They could come back as the liver-eater in disguise.

There are many tales of her deception, including her trick of turning into her victim, hiding the body, and going into the victim's home to wait until the parents left or the family was asleep to take all their livers. Parents warned children not to go into the forest alone because Spearfinger waited for them and made sure they knew she would appear as "grandmother or [their] favorite aunt".

Hunters alone in the woods used to see an old woman with a strangely-shaped hand. She would sing her haunting song, so frightening them that they would hasten back to their villages as quietly as they could. The Cherokee claim that Spearfinger stabs her victims "in the back of their neck or through their heart, drawing out their livers. Spearfinger's attack is very quick. When she steals livers, her finger does not leave a scar, and victims do not feel the wound. Several days after the unnoticed attack, the victims become ill and die."

== Death of Spearfinger ==
The Cherokee called a great council, including Tomotley, Tenase, Setico, and Chota towns, which were haunted by the liver eater. The medicine man, adawehis, explained the Spearfinger's deception and how to attract her. They knew about her finger because they saw her dancing on "ledges of Sanigilagi". They just did not know how to kill her, but the medicine man said they might get lucky. Following advice of the medicine man, the people set a trap for Spearfinger by digging a pit and covering it with brush. They made a fire with green saplings, which made a vast amount of smoke rise into the air. Spearfinger saw the smoke from Chilhowee Mountain and ran to the village, crushing the ground as she walked. She approached hiding her right hand with a blanket.

When they saw her as an old woman, the hunter hesitated thinking she was one of their own or from a neighboring village. She called to them for help as she walked, but the medicine man knew her trick. He threw his spear first, which broke into pieces when it hit her. The rest of the hunters began to attack, seeing through her disguise. Her skin deflected the arrows.

Spearfinger revealed her covered hand, ran towards the men, and fell into their pit. She was unharmed, though, by the stakes, and "swatted at the arrows as though they were irksome gnats." Finding herself trapped in the pit, she slashed her finger in every direction trying to catch someone and taunted them with her song about eating livers.

Birds flew down from the sky as "celestial beings" to aid the Cherokee. A bird called Utsu'`gï, a titmouse, flew to the hunting party and sang "un, un, un." This sounded like u-nahu, which means "heart", so they aimed for her chest. When the arrows failed to kill her, they caught the titmouse and cut off its tongue. Ever since then, whenever people see the titmouse’s short tongue, they are reminded that it's a liar. It was not that the bird lied on purpose, but that he "simply was not specific enough." After that, the titmouse flew into the sky, returning to the Upper World. It would never return.

Then, a chickadee, Tsï'kïlilï', finally came and landed on her right hand, the one with the spear, and the hunters viewed that as an omen to shoot for the hand she kept double-fisted. She became even more upset and scared at this. Hitting her where the wrist and right hand joined or, some say, where the Spearfinger joined the wrist, they severed her heart. She sank to the ground, and her finger "twitched and was still." The curse of Spearfinger, the liver eater, ended.

Stone Man, her other liver-eating friend, heard the victorious cheers and later saw her right hand with the spear on a post beside the village. He considered himself warned. Knowing his own weakness, Stone Man shrugged the warning off because no one knew it yet. He continued to sing his song of war, livers, and hunting.

In recognition of the help which the chickadee gave to the hunters in their hour of need, the bird has ever afterward been known as the "truth teller" and, if ever it should perch near the house of a man who is away hunting, this is taken as a sign that the hunter will return safely from his trip.

Despite her death, Cherokee story-tellers continue to tell the legend of Spearfinger and point out the place where her stone structure fell down.

== In popular culture ==
Spearfinger is the hidden antagonist in the movie The Hike (2021). In the movie, her spirit is freed and starts growing in power when it is disturbed by an unsuspecting couple hiking in the Great Smoky Mountains. Her spirit looks for a new body, and eventually takes over a female hiker after Spearfinger orchestrates the elaborate death of four strangers. In the film, she kills people by throwing rocks, knocking down trees, appearing as loved ones and stabbing people with her obsidian finger. She also appears as a young female hiker, and seduces a man to his demise in a hidden cave. This movie was made by Big N Funky Productions, the same group that has made an episode of Wrestling With Ghosts where they try to find Spearfinger on the Nolan Creek Trail.
