= Tsul 'Kalu =

Legendary figure of Cherokee folklore

Tsul 'Kalu (slant-eyed or sloping giant), or Judaculla(h) (ᏧᏓᎦᎳ or ᏧᏓᎫᎳ), is a legendary figure of Cherokee mythology who plays the role of the great lord of the hunt, and as such is frequently invoked in hunting rites and rituals.

== Name and origins ==
The tale is one of the best-known Cherokee legends and was recorded by Europeans as early as 1823, often using the spelling Tuli cula. The name Tsul 'Kalu literally means "he has them slanting/sloping", understood to refer to his eyes, although the word for eye (akta, plural dikta) is not a part of it. In the plural form (Mooney: Tsunil'kälû', "the Slant-eyed people"), it is also the name of a traditional race of giants said to have once visited the Cherokee from the far west. When the Bible was translated into Cherokee in the 19th century, this plural was used to render the "giants" (nephilim) of Genesis 6:4, which Bender and Belt describe as producing a distinctively Cherokee reading of the passage. He may have resembled a deer.

According to T.J. Holland, a cultural-resources supervisor for the Eastern Band of Cherokee Indians, Tsul 'Kalu looked after the region's plants, animals, and water before the Cherokee arrived and taught them how to live before departing. Holland has called him the Appalachians' "first forest ranger".

== In local nomenclature ==
He is said to dwell in a place called Tsunegun'yi. The words Tsul and Tsune and their variations appear in a number of Cherokee place names throughout the Southeastern United States, especially in western North Carolina and eastern Tennessee.

Tsul`kälû' Tsunegûñ'yï is a 100-acre (40 ha) patch on a slope of the mountain Tanasee Bald in Jackson County, North Carolina, on the ridge upon which the boundary of Haywood, Jackson, and Transylvania Counties converge. It is believed Tsul 'Kalu was responsible for clearing the spot for his residence. The name was anglicized by Europeans as Jutaculla or Judaculla; consequently the area is also known as the "Jutaculla Old Fields". There is also a large slab of soapstone called Judaculla Rock nearby, which is covered in petroglyphs. According to legend, these markings were left when the giant leapt from his mountaintop to the valley below, his hand and fingernail impressing the then-soft rock. Until the Cherokee removal of the 1830s, priests and hunters are said to have visited the rock to make supplication to Tsul 'Kalu as a god of the hunt, leaving offerings in hope of success in hunting.

Another place associated with Tsul 'Kalu, Tsula'sinun'yi (literally "where the footprint is"), is located on the Tuckasegee River, about a mile above Deep Creek in Swain County, North Carolina. Impressions said to have been the footprints of the giant Tsul`kälû' and a deer was found on a rock that was destroyed during railroad building.

A cluster of place-names in the western North Carolina mountains preserves the legend, including Judaculla Ridge and Judaculla Mountain, most lying within about 15 miles (24 km) of Tanasee Bald.

== In popular culture ==
- Tsul 'Kalu appears in The Secret Saturdays. Introduced in the episode "The Return of Tsul 'Kalu", he attacks the Saturday family to retrieve his hand, which was incorporated into Zak's staff. Tsul 'Kalu previously encountered Solomon "Doc" Saturday and scarred his face, costing him the use of one of his eyes. Tsul 'Kalu later appears in the episode "And Your Enemies Closer", where he saves Zak Saturday from V. V. Argost.
- In the popular online game World of Warcraft, Tsul 'Kalu appears as a massive white gorilla in the zone known as "Northern Stranglethorn". Also known as "The Earth Spirit", he is neutral unless attacked and is often tamed by hunters for his unique appearance.
- In the book The Lost Hero by Rick Riordan, Tsul 'Kalu is mentioned by Piper McLean's father Tristan McLean after she, Jason Grace, and Leo Valdez rescue him from Enceladus, a Giant monster who Tristan McLean, a Cherokee, sees through the lens of Cherokee mythology, and the other Giants.
- In the film In The Devil's Courthouse, Tsul 'Kalu is referenced as Judaculla and is depicted as a ravenous creature who terrorizes a young woman, her brother, and a small group of friends in the Appalachian Mountains of Western North Carolina.
- The Tsul 'Kalu appeared in the season finale of Mountain Monsters third season, and is mentioned in the fourth season, where it’s the second monster of the series to be a subject in three episodes, the first being the Yahoo and the Grassman.
- Tsul'Kalu appears as the main antagonist in the novel "Flux" by Jeremy Robinson. This version is portrayed as one of the nephilim and a merciless hunter. He ruthlessly pursues the book’s main protagonist, Owen Mcoy and his allies.
- The writer MariJo Moore, of Cherokee descent, retold the legend in her poem "Tsul 'Kalu' and the Children of Water", published in the North Carolina Literary Review in 1997.

== See also ==
- List of topics characterized as pseudoscience
- Judaculla Rock
- Bigfoot
- Nimrod
