= Cherufe =

Mythical creature of Chile

The Cherufe is a large man-eating mythical creature found in the Mapuche religion of the indigenous Mapuche people of south-central Chile.

== Description ==
The Cherufe is an evil humanoid creature made of rock crystals and magma. It is said that Cherufe inhabit the magma pools found deep within Chilean volcanoes and are the source of earthquakes and volcanic eruptions. Cherufe are also said to be the source of "magicians' ardent stones" (meteorites and volcanic stones) that cause damage in volcanic regions.

The only way to abate the Cherufe's appetite for destruction was to satiate the beast's taste for human flesh by throwing a sacrificial victim into the bowels of its volcanic home. Much like the European dragon, the Cherufe's preferred delicacy came in the form of virginal maidens.

The mythological origins of this beast may have originated to explain anomalies of geological events such as volcanic eruptions.

== See also ==
- Pachamama, an Inca goddess who caused earthquakes
- The Secret Saturdays, an animated TV show which portrayed Cherufe as one of the cryptids examined by the main characters in the 8th episode (Twelve Hundred Degrees Fahrenheit)
