= Lake Van Monster =

Lake monster said to live in eastern Turkey

Creature information
- Other name(s): Van Gölü Canavarı, Վանա լճի հրեշ
- Sub grouping: Lake monster

Origin
- Region: Lake Van, Van

In Armenian and Turkish folklores, the Lake Van Monster (Turkish: Van Gölü Canavarı, Armenian: Վանա լճի հրեշ, romanized: Vana lchi hresh) is a lake monster said to live in Lake Van in eastern Turkey.

== History ==
The Armenian chroniclers Movses Khorenatsi and Anania Shirakatsi wrote about vishaps (water dragons in Armenian mythology) living in Lake Van. According to the myth, the god Vahagn, the vishapakagh ("reaper of vishaps"), would plunge into Lake Van to drag out any vishap that had grown large enough to devour the world. Scholar James Russell discusses the idea that this is an Armenian adoption of Urartian myths concerning the combat of the god Teisheba with the water monster Ullikummi. Russell writes that into the modern period, the Armenians of the Van basin would refer to the sudden storms that arise on the lake as vishap kami (վիշապ քամի, dragon wind).

A story in the Ottoman newspaper Saadet from 29 April 1889 claimed that a creature had purportedly dragged a man into Lake Van. Following reports of the incident, the Ottoman government sent an official scientific survey group to the lake. The group ultimately failed to spot the alleged animal.

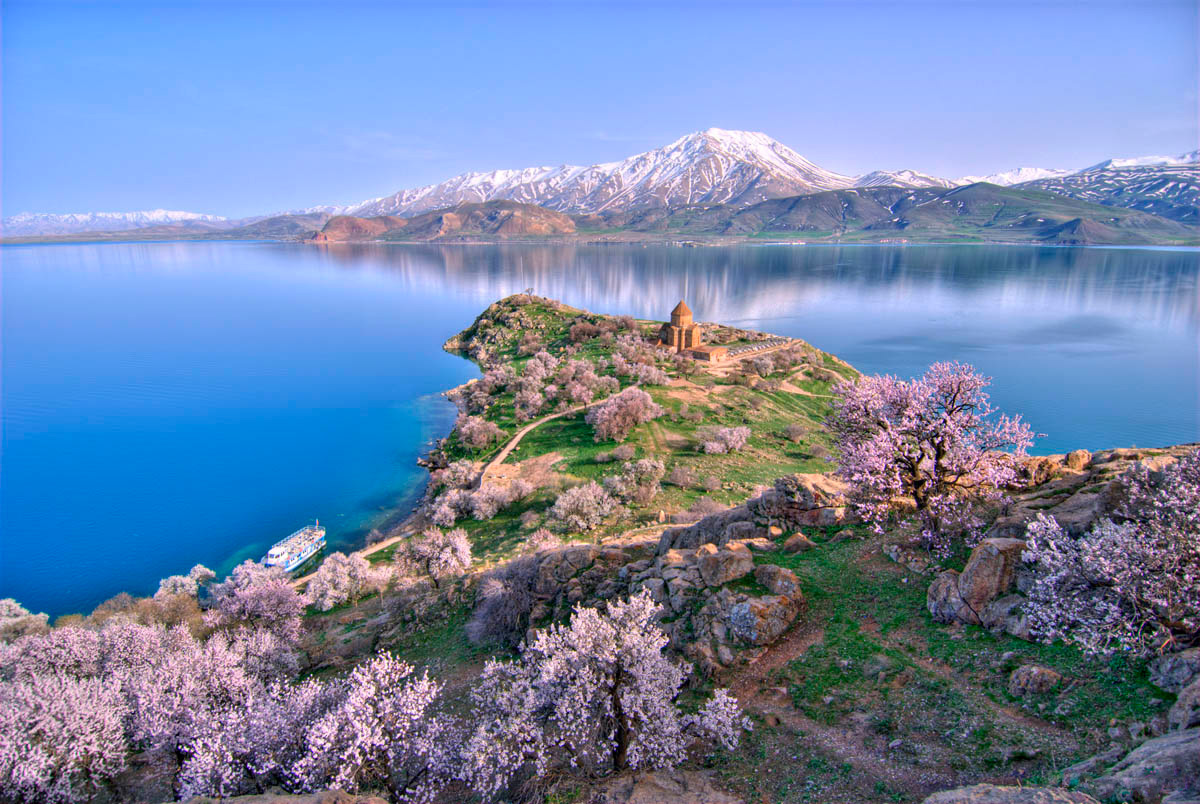
Akhtamar Island, Lake Van

Russell discounts a connection between the belief about lake vishaps and the 1990s sightings of a lake creature, considering any folk beliefs amongst the Kurdish population to more likely be affected by stories about lake monsters in popular Western culture than any surviving Armenian traditions. He also recounts that Kurds he met in Van in 1994 and 1997 considered the lake monster story to be a "commercial ploy and a farce".

In 1997, a local man called Ünal Kozak claimed to have captured the monster on video, which was sent for analysis. Collaborating with Kozak, academic Mustafa Y. Nutku wrote a book about the creature.

Kozak's video has been questioned, specifically whether the footage was framed to hide a boat, why the alleged animal's path does not appear to curve, and why the breathing appears to be a continuous release, much like the effects of an air hose.

A four-metre-high (13 ft) statue based on reported sightings has been erected to commemorate the alleged creature in Van, Turkey.

Skeptics point out that the region would benefit from tourist revenue and also further posit that a hoax might attract visitors.

== Cultural impact ==
The former Prime Minister of Turkey and poet Bülent Ecevit wrote a poem titled "Van Gölü Canavarı" (Lake Van Monster).

The Lake Van Monster appears in The Secret Saturdays episode "The Unblinking Eye". This version resembles a Mosasaurus-like creature.

Animal X (an Australian television show) features the Lake Van Monster in the third episode of the first season.

In the series Destination Truth, Josh Gates and his team search for the Lake Van Monster in the fifth episode of season three, titled "Alien Mummies/Lake Van Monster".

The TV series Paranormal Caught on Camera featured footage purportedly captured of the alleged animal.

== See also ==
- Loch Ness Monster
