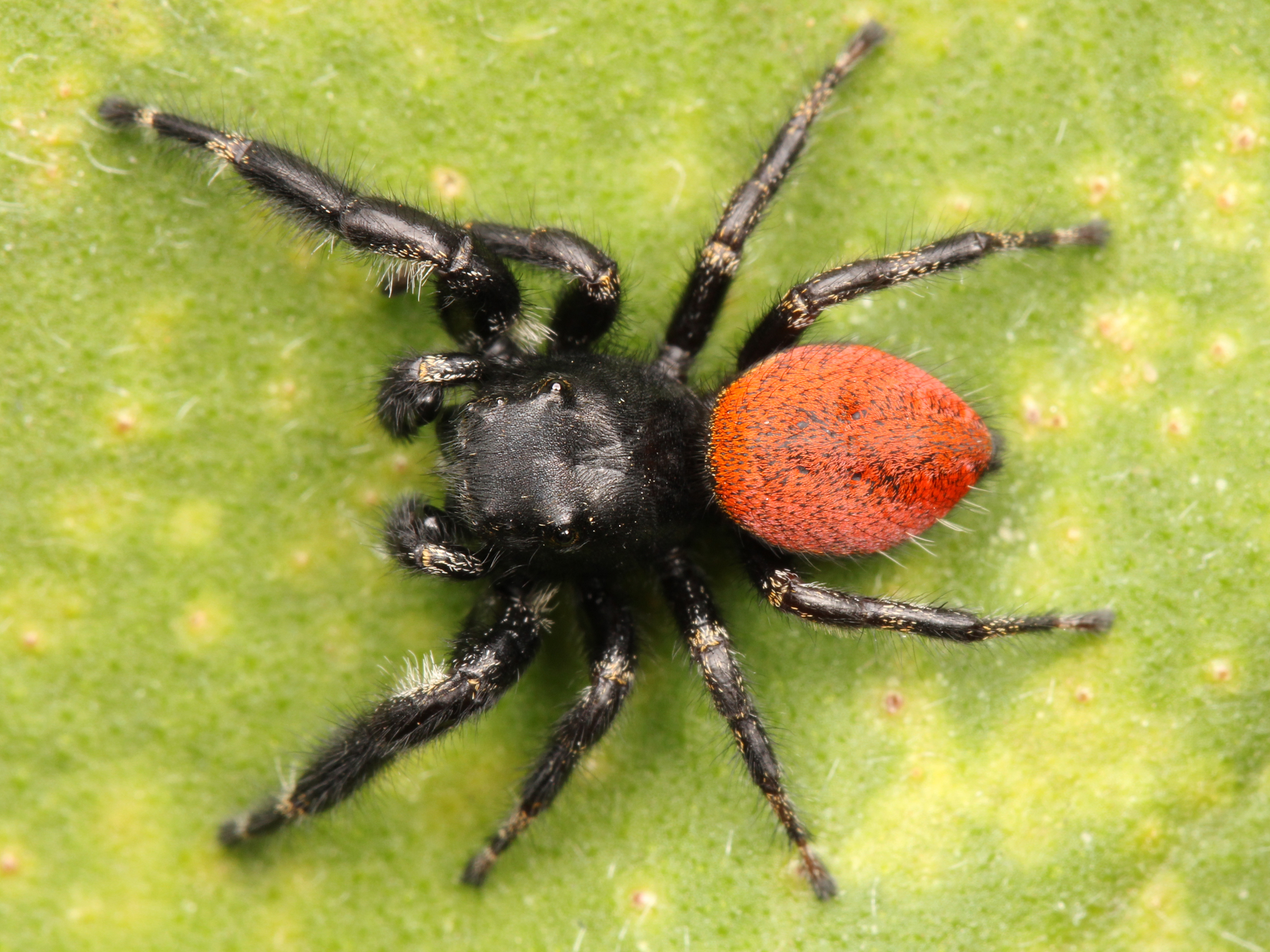
- Male
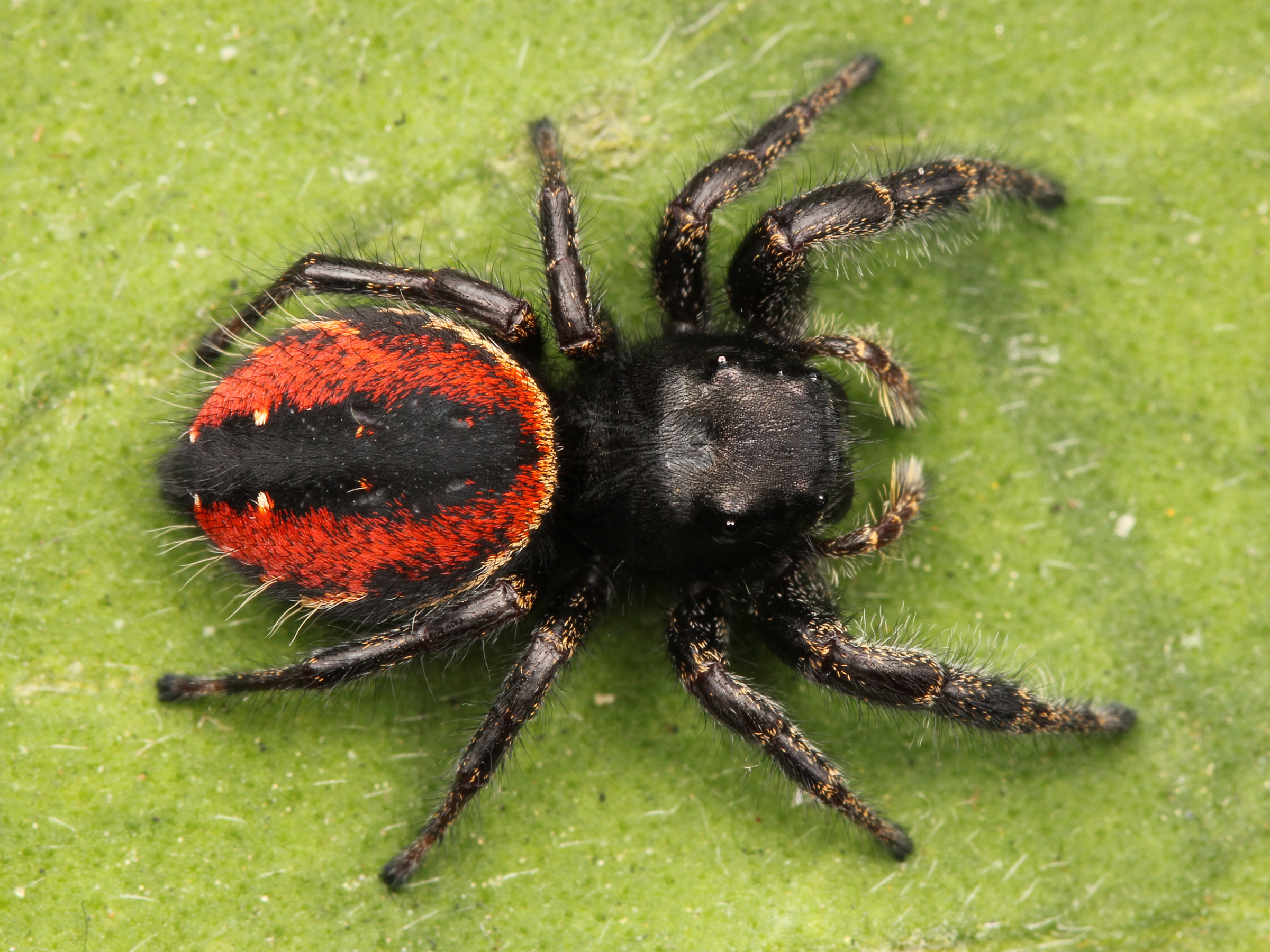
- Female

Scientific classification
- Kingdom: Animalia
- Phylum: Arthropoda
- Subphylum: Chelicerata
- Class: Arachnida
- Order: Araneae
- Infraorder: Araneomorphae
- Family: Salticidae
- Genus: Phidippus
- Species: P. johnsoni

Binomial name
- Phidippus johnsoni (Peckham & Peckham, 1883)

Synonyms
- Attus johnsonii Peckham & Peckham, 1883; Phidippus bicolor Keyserling, 1885; Dendryphantes johnsoni (Peckham & Peckham, 1883)

= Phidippus johnsoni =

Red-backed jumping spider

Species of spider

Phidippus johnsoni, the red-backed jumping spider or Johnson jumping spider, is one of the largest and most commonly encountered jumping spiders of western North America. It is not to be confused with the unrelated and highly venomous redback spider (Latrodectus hasselti).

== Description ==
Adults tend to be about a centimeter in length. Both sexes have a bright red abdomen; the female has an additional black central stripe. The chelicerae of both sexes are of a shining teal color. The rest of the body is mostly black. It is one of the species of jumping spiders that are mimics of mutillid wasps in the genus Dasymutilla (commonly known as "velvet ants"); several species of these wasps are similar in size and coloration, and possess a very painful sting.

== Distribution ==
The distribution of P. johnsoni is bounded by the Great Plains, the Pacific Ocean, northern Mexico, and southern Canada. It occurs from sea level to tree line, occupying relatively dry habitats such as coastal dunes or oak woodlands. Between two and thirty redback jumping spiders per 1,000 m^{2} were found during a study in 1976.

In 2012, NASA sent an individual of this species into space.

== Habits ==
This species constructs conspicuous tubular silken nests under rocks and wood on the ground and sometimes grape vines. They remain inside these at night and during bad weather. Molting, egg laying and sometimes courtship and mating occur inside these nests. Most of the time they feed on prey about half their own size, but a range from 2 millimetres (0.079 in) to about 1 centimetre (0.39 in) has been observed. Although found to feed on a wide variety of insects (e.g., flies, bugs and moth caterpillars and adults), they also prey heavily on spiders. Cannibalism does occur from time to time, in the form of females feeding on males.
