= Allegewi =

Legendary ancient Native American giants

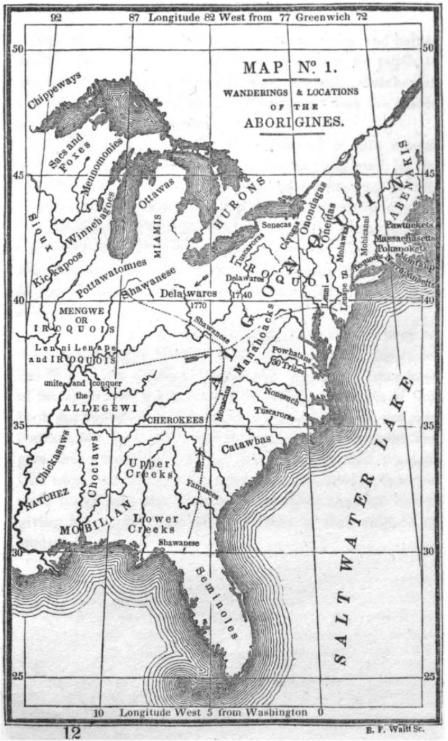
A map from Emma Willard's Abridged History of the United States (1843), which presents the Allegewi as a historical people defeated by the Lenape and Haudenosaunee.

Allegewi (also Alligewi or Talligewi, or other variants) is the name of a purported ancient Native American people associated in tradition with the construction of prehistoric earthworks and fortifications in the Mississippi and Ohio River valleys. Although commonly identified in 19th-century sources as a "giant race" encountered and expelled by migrating Lenape and Haudenosaunee peoples, the historical existence of the Allegewi is widely disputed by modern scholars and regarded as part of Native oral tradition, settler mythmaking, and early attempts at ethnological explanation of the so-called Mound Builders.

== Sources ==
Various recorded Native American traditions portray the Allegewi as a people of immense stature, credited with the creation of large mounds and fortified earthworks throughout the region. Some versions suggest that their expulsion opened the land for settlement by the Delaware and Haudenosaunee, and that the Allegewi may have been identical with the mysterious Mound Builders whose remains are found across the Mississippi and Ohio river basins.

=== John Heckewelder ===
The spies which the Lenape had sent forward for the purpose of reconnoitring [sic] had long before their arrival discovered that the country east of the Mississippi was inhabited by a very powerful nation, who had many large towns built on the great rivers flowing through their land. Those people (as I was told) called themselves Talligeu or Talligewi. Colonel John Gibson, however, a gentleman who has a thorough knowledge of the Indians, and speaks several of their languages, is of opinion that they were not called Talligewi, but Alligewi, and it would seem that he is right, from the traces of their name which still remain in the country, the Allegheny river and mountains having indubitably been named after them. [...] Many wonderful things are told of this famous people. They are said to have been remarkably tall and stout, and there is a tradition that there were giants among them, people of a much larger size than the tallest of the Lenape. It is related that they had built to themselves regular fortifications or entrenchments, from whence they would sally out, but were generally repulsed. I have seen many of the fortifications said to have been built by them...

— John Heckewelder, History, Manners, and Customs of the Indian Nations (1819)

One of the earliest and most influential sources to mention the Allegewi is John Heckewelder, a Moravian missionary who collected Lenape oral traditions in the early 19th century.

In his 1819 work History, Manners, and Customs of the Indian Nations, Heckewelder recorded a Lenape tradition recounting a migration eastward from beyond the Mississippi River. According to the narrative, the Lenape (Delaware) and their allies, the Mengwe (Haudenosaunee), sought to cross the river known as the Namæsi Sipu, or "River of Fish," but encountered resistance from a powerful nation called the Allegewi, who inhabited the region and had constructed numerous towns and fortifications. After initially denying them passage, the Allegewi permitted a portion of the Lenape to cross, but, alarmed by their numbers, launched a preemptive attack. The Lenape and Mengwe then declared war. A protracted conflict followed in which many perished on both sides, and eventually the Allegewi were defeated and fled down the Mississippi, never to return. The victors divided the land, with the Mengwe settling near the Great Lakes and the Lenape claiming the region to the south. Heckewelder speculated that the Allegheny River and Mountains derived their name from the displaced Allegewi people, whose memory persisted in alleged Lenape place-names such as Alligéwi Sipu ("River of the Allegewi").

=== David Cusick ===
A similar account appears in a brief 1827 publication by David Cusick, a Tuscarora author, who described an ancient conflict between the ancestors of the Haudenosaunee and a "great people" inhabiting the lands west of the Mississippi. Cusick's narrative includes supernatural and mythological elements but closely parallels the Allegewi tradition.

=== Walam Olum ===
The Walam Olum is a controversial text first published in 1836 by Constantine Samuel Rafinesque, who claimed to have obtained it from Lenape sources. Purporting to be a Native American migration legend inscribed in pictographs with accompanying verse, the text presents a mytho-historical narrative of Lenape origins and travels. While widely accepted in the 19th century, its authenticity has since been heavily disputed.

A notable parallel between the Allegewi tradition recorded by Heckewelder and the Walam Olum is found in a verse that runs: "When some infiltrated into the east where the Talligewi were, some were killed" (IV, 52).

Accompanying commentary in the 1954 Indiana Historical Society edition identifies this line as closely matching Heckewelder's account of a Lenape incursion into the Ohio Valley, which was repelled by a powerful resident tribe called the Allegewi. In an essay included in the 1954 edition, this convergence between oral narrative and written legend was regarded by contributor Eli Lilly as evidence for the independent authenticity of both sources. Since Heckewelder died in 1823, several years before Rafinesque's alleged transcription of the Walam Olum was made public, Lilly concluded that Heckewelder could not have relied on it as a source. Instead, he argued that the Walam Olum must preserve a genuine Lenape tradition, independently echoed in Heckewelder's missionary accounts.

Although long treated as a genuine Native American historical document, however, the Walam Olum is now broadly regarded as a literary fabrication. Andrew Newman has characterized it as an "indigenous apocrypha"—a text that was not simply a hoax but one that held appeal because it seemed to fill gaps in Native American history using biblical narrative forms familiar to its nineteenth-century readers.

== Scholarly skepticism ==
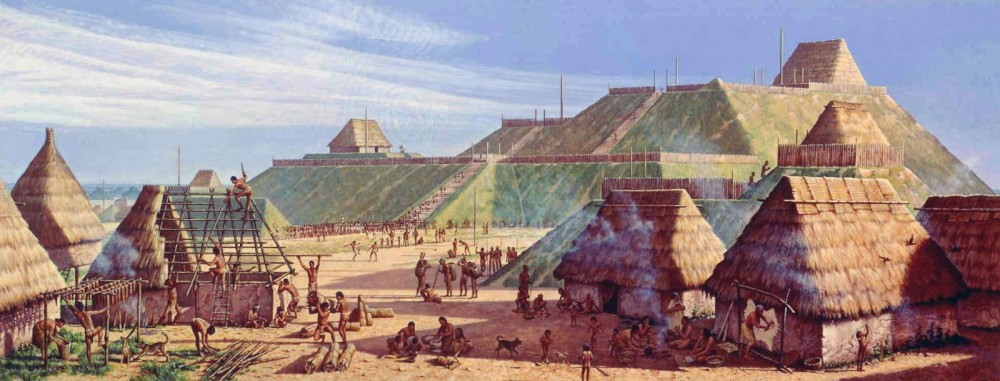
Artist's reconstruction of Monks Mound at Cahokia. The monumental earthworks of the Mississippi and Ohio River valleys were often attributed in the 19th century to a "lost race" such as the Allegewi, invoked in settler narratives to explain the origins of these ancient structures.

By the 1820s, Heckewelder's history had already attracted criticism, prompting a formal defense by Philadelphia lawyer William Rawle before the Historical Society of Pennsylvania in 1826. Rawle emphasized Heckewelder's moral reputation, his long residence among the Lenape, and his commitment to recording their traditions faithfully. He argued that to disregard such traditions would be to misunderstand the nature of indigenous historical memory. While acknowledging that some elements were dramatized (e.g., the total destruction of the Allegewi), Rawle maintained that these stories were no more implausible than the foundational myths of European antiquity and that Heckewelder should not be faulted for repeating what was clearly presented as native tradition.

Heckewelder's account faced mounting scholarly scrutiny throughout the 19th century. In a critical article in the Magazine of Western History (1885), for example, Russell Errett questioned both the etymological and historical validity of the Allegewi narrative. Errett notes that Heckewelder had attempted to associate the Allegewi with a prehistoric tribe defeated by the Lenape, possibly ancestral to the Cherokee, whom he claimed had once called themselves Tsallakee. Errett further reviewed multiple proposed etymologies for the name Allegheny,^{[a]} including derivations from Seneca and Algonquin words meaning "cold water" or "endless river," but found none of them compellingly supported by evidence. He criticized the missionary tradition reported by Heckewelder, which claimed the name referred to an ancient people, and concluded that the Allegewi were purely mythical. Errett finally argued that the myth of the Allegewi bore similarities to stories from Biblical history and may have been influenced by missionaries’ exposure to the story of the Israelites in Canaan.

Despite the scholarly doubts of the late 19th century, some historians continued to treat Heckewelder's account as authoritative. George Bancroft, for example, accepted the tradition as historical. Bancroft even suggested that place names such as Youghiogheny preserved remnants of the Allegewi language. Writing in 1893, Catholic historian Andrew Arnold Lambing stated definitively that the Allegheny River and Mountains were named for "the Allegewi, a powerful tribe of Indians," reflecting the continued acceptance of the tradition in popular histories of the period.

Modern scholars have further scrutinized the circumstances under which Heckewelder received and transmitted the Allegewi legend. Historian Terry A. Barnhart notes that Heckewelder accepted the Lenape tradition without questioning its mythological elements, including the claim that the Allegewi were giants. During his missionary travels in the 1780s, Heckewelder encountered large earthworks near Lake St. Clair and the Sandusky River, which his Native guide identified as the remains of Alligewi fortifications and burial sites. Instead of questioning these claims, Heckewelder included them in his account of Lenape migration, considering the earthworks he had seen as confirmation of the stories he had been told. Barnhart argues that Heckewelder's treatment of the story as historically credible helped enshrine the legend within early 19th-century theories about the origin of North America's mound structures. In this way, Heckewelder's narrative contributed significantly to the so-called Mound Builder paradigm, which posited the existence of a vanished, semi-civilized race preceding Native Americans and supported settler-colonial ideologies of replacement.

== Cultural impact ==
The Allegewi legend captured the imagination of early 19th-century writers. An allusion appears in Yamoyden: A Tale of the Wars of King Philip (1820), an epic poem principally authored by James Wallis Eastburn. A pioneering treatment of the Romantic image of the American Indian, the poem was completed and published by Robert Charles Sands after Eastburn's death. The poem evokes the memory of the Allegewi as a vanished but noble race:

The grass o'er their mounds and their fortresses waves,
And choaked amid weeds are the stones on their graves;
The hunter yet lingers in wonder, where keeps
The rock on the mountains the track of their steps;
Nor other memorial remains there, nor trace,
Of the proud Allegewi's invincible race.

== Alleged archaeological evidence ==
A 2022 article in the Pittsburgh Post-Gazette reported local claims that a 1921 University of Pittsburgh excavation in Verona uncovered two skeletons over nine feet tall, and that further discoveries in South and North Park yielded similarly oversized remains. Local historian John Schalcosky connected these archaeological findings to the legend of the Allegewi.

Despite popular fascination with tales of giant skeletons, archaeological investigations have found no credible evidence to support such claims. A 2020 retrospective by the Robert S. Peabody Institute traced one widely circulated story concerning "horned giants" allegedly unearthed in Pennsylvania in 1916 to a misinterpretation of deer antlers found in a burial context. Original investigators made no mention of "giants" in their published reports, and later analysis concluded that both the reported size and nature of the remains had been exaggerated or misidentified. As noted by Emily Hurley, early excavators may have overestimated the stature of the remains due to cultural expectations and relative height differences: "At the time, the average height of most Europeans was about five feet six inches tall, whereas Native Americans were thought to average about six feet tall. While six inches is not that big of a difference, anyone taller than six feet may seem like a giant to the generally shorter Europeans."

== Sources ==
- Heckewelder, John (1881) [1819]. Reichel, William (ed.). History, manners, and customs of the Indian nations who once inhabited Pennsylvania and the neighboring states. Philadelphia: Historical Society of Pennsylvania.

== Notes ==
^{a} Modern sources consider the name Allegheny to derive from Unami Alikehane, derived from alike ("to step") + -hane ("river"), literally "stepping-river".
