= Tanasee Bald =

Mountain in North Carolina, United States

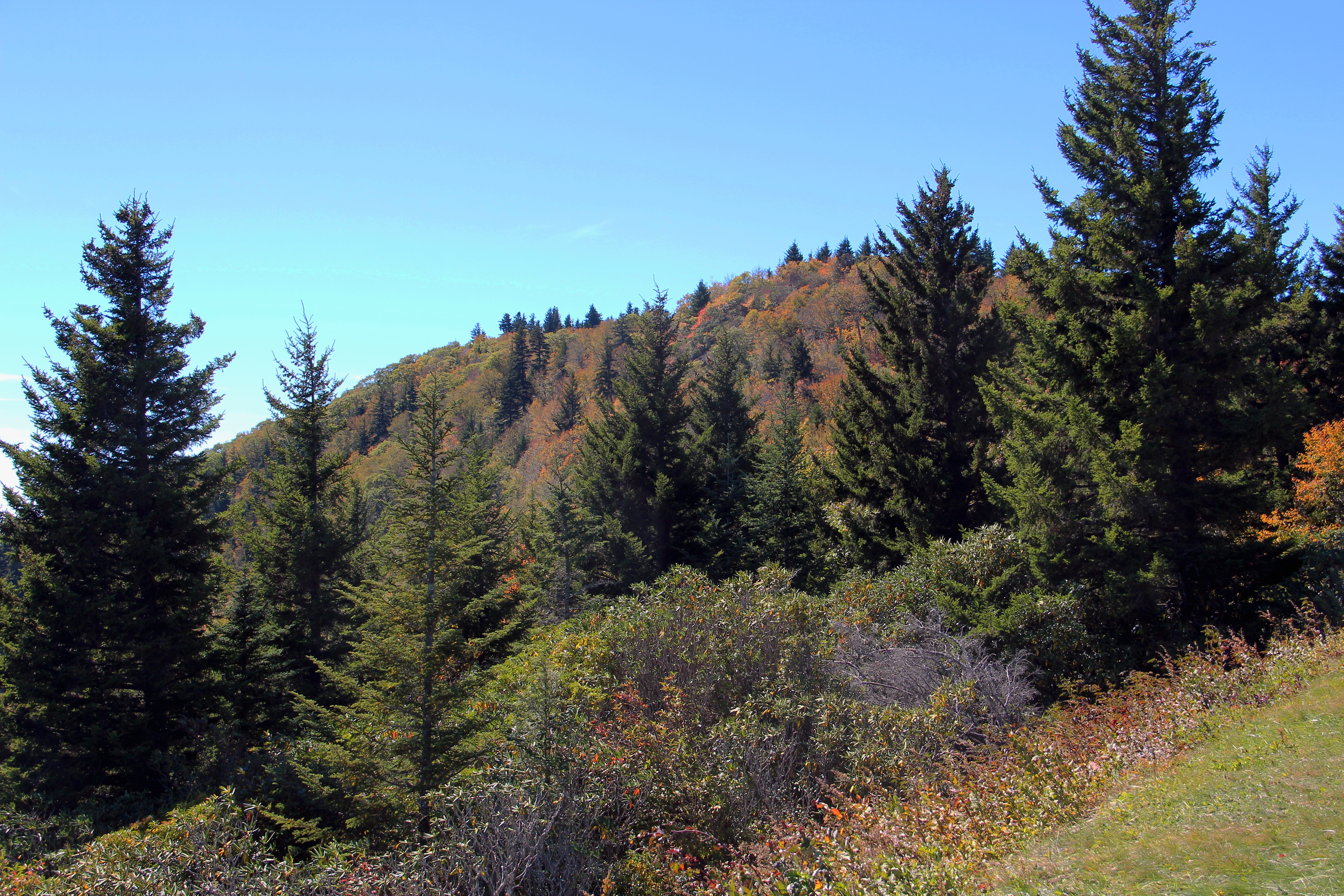
- Tanasee Bald viewed from the Blue Ridge Parkway

Highest point
- Elevation: 5,561 ft (1,695 m)
- Coordinates: 35°17′30″N 82°55′03″W

Geography
- Location: Haywood / Transylvania counties, North Carolina, U.S.
- Parent range: Great Balsam Mountains; Blue Ridge Mountains
- Topo map: USGS Sam Knob

Climbing
- Easiest route: Hike

Tanasee Bald, also called Tennessee Bald, is a mountain near the Blue Ridge Parkway in western North Carolina, on the Haywood/Transylvania border. It is 5561 feet high. It is in the Great Balsam Mountains within the Blue Ridge Mountains, which is part of the Appalachian Mountains

Tanasee Bald is the southern limit of breeding of the northern saw-whet owl, which is from the boreal forests of Canada.

== Myth of Jutaculla ==
Cherokee folklore is that Jutaculla (alternative English spelling is Judaculla; Cherokee name is Tsul'kălû'), a slant-eyed giant, lives on top of the bald.

== See also ==
- List of mountains in North Carolina
