= Tennent Mountain =

Peak in Pisgah National Forest

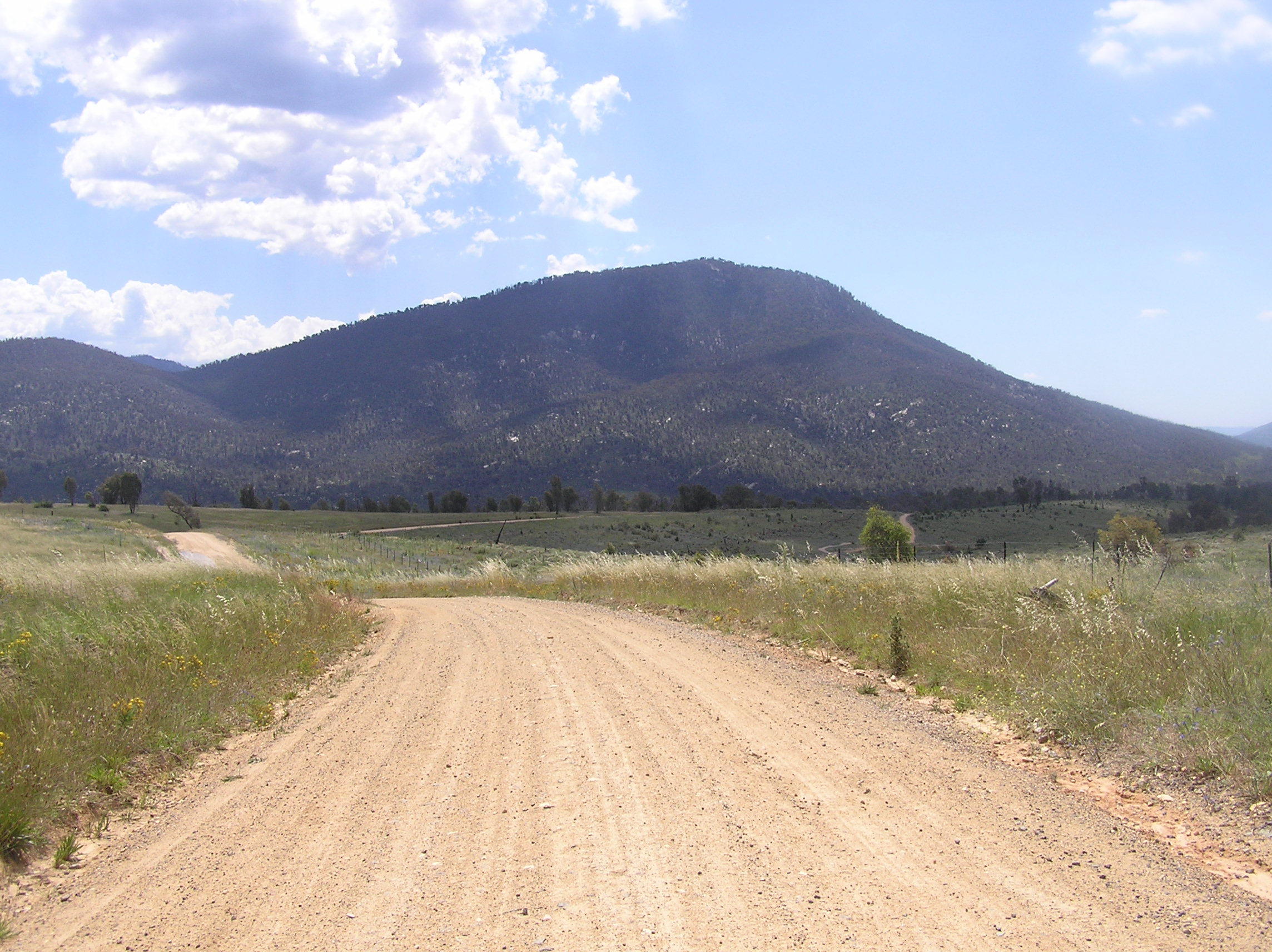
- View of Tennent Mountain from the east side

Highest point
- Elevation: 6,040 ft (1,841 m)
- Prominence: 157 ft (48m)

Geography

Tennent Mountain is a grassy bald and summit in the Great Balsams of western North Carolina, located within Pisgah National Forest. and adjacent to the Black Balsam Knob area along the Blue Ridge Parkway. The mountain is notable for its treeless summit and panoramic views. The Art Loeb Trail, a long distance hiking trail, crosses the summit.

== Geography and elevation ==
Tennent Mountain rises to an elevation of 6,040 ft (1,841 m) and is positioned at approximately 35.33700°N, 82.869°W. The summit is a rocky grassy bald and sits among a chain of high balds and knobs in the Great Balsam Mountains, which are a subrange of the Blue Ridge Mountains, themselves a physiographic province of the Appalachians. It is part of Pisgah National Forest, and is extremely close to the Shining Rock Wilderness, but the actual summit of the mountain is approximately 0.1 miles from the border.

== History and summit marker ==
A large summit plaque on Tennent Mountain is dedicated to Gaillard Stoney Tennent (1872–1953), who became the first president of the Carolina Mountain Club in 1923, and recognizes his role in establishing organized hiking in North Carolina.

== Trails and access ==
Tennent Mountain is reached from parking along Forest Road 816 crossing near the Blue Ridge Parkway and is part of a network of trails that includes the Art Loeb Trail, Ivestor Gap Trail, and connections to the Mountains-to-Sea Trail. Hikers typically approach via the Art Loeb Trail north from the parking area, cross the Black Balsam balds, and continue to Tennent's summit.

Several loop options that include Tennent Mountain are popular with day hikers. One frequently described route is a roughly 5-mile loop that traverses multiple balds (Black Balsam Knob, Tennent Mountain, and nearby knolls), using sections of the Art Loeb and Ivestor Gap Trails.

== See also ==
- Black Balsam Knob
- Art Loeb Trail
- Pisgah National Forest
