= Black Balsam Knob =

Mountain in North Carolina, United States

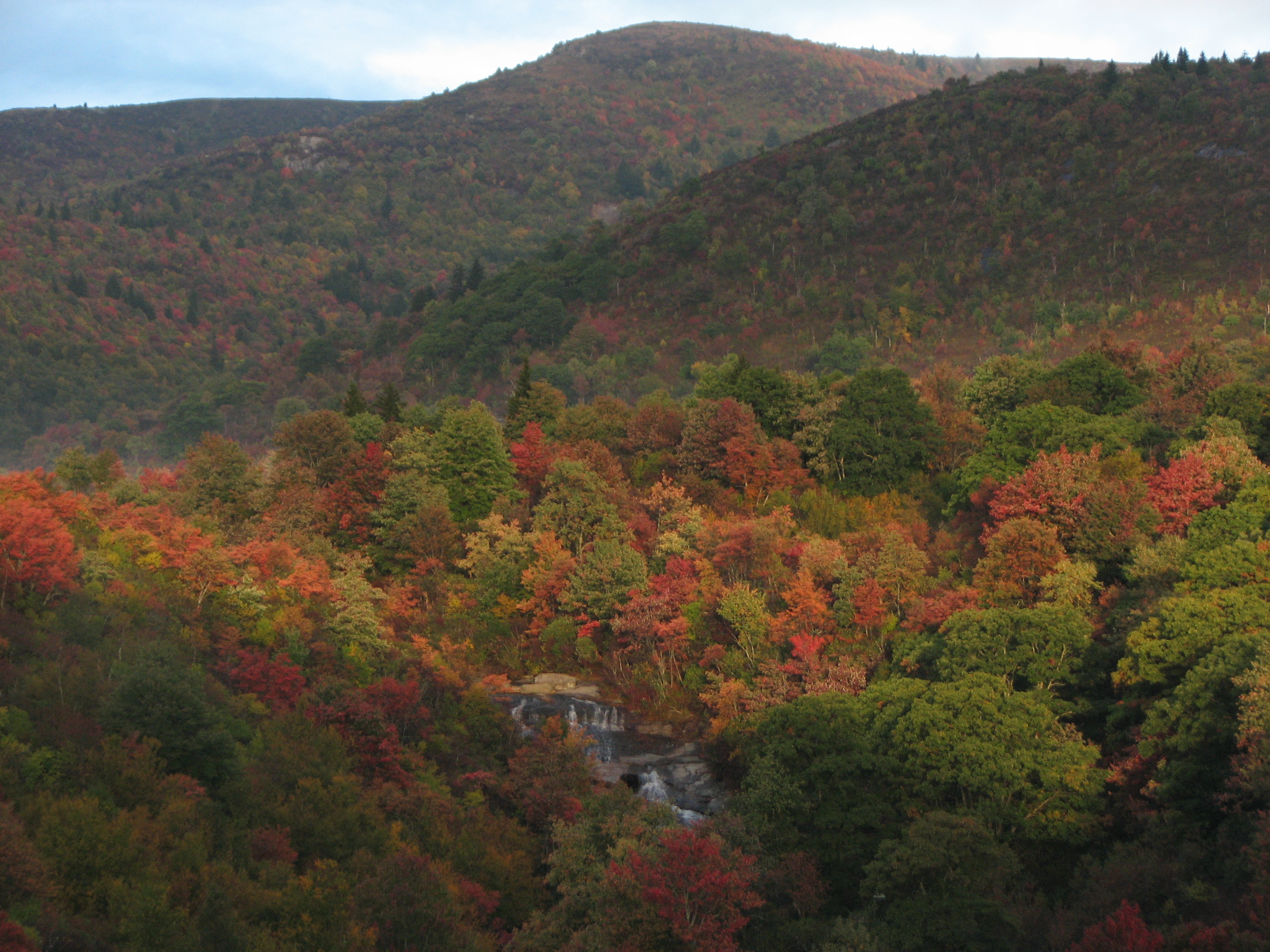
- Black Balsam Knob as seen at sunrise from Blue Ridge Parkway Milepost 419 in autumn.

Highest point
- Elevation: 6,214 ft (1,894 m)
- Prominence: 989 ft (301 m)
- Coordinates: 35°19′40″N 82°52′27″W

Geography
- Location: Haywood County, North Carolina, U.S.
- Parent range: Great Balsam Mountains; Blue Ridge Mountains
- Topo map: USGS Shining Rock

Climbing
- Easiest route: Hike

Black Balsam Knob, also known as Black Balsam Bald, is in the Pisgah National Forest southwest of Asheville, North Carolina, near milepost 420 on the Blue Ridge Parkway. It is the second highest mountain in the Great Balsam Mountains. The Great Balsams are within the Blue Ridge Mountains, which are part of the Appalachian Mountains. It is the 23rd highest of the 40 mountains in North Carolina over 6000 feet.

The top of the mountain is a grassy bald that affords a panoramic view. The origin of grassy balds in southern Haywood county is a result of extensive clear-cut logging and locomotive fires in 1925 and 1942. These fires burned deep down into the mineral-rich topsoil slowing reforestation or stopping it altogether. Examples of this can also be found on many of its neighboring peaks and ridges. These features contribute to the area's popularity, but foot traffic also causes some ecological damage to the ecosystem. The Art Loeb Trail follows the grassy ridge of Black Balsam Knob.

Visible peaks from Black Balsam Knob include:

- Shining Rock in the Shining Rock Wilderness (3 miles northeast)
- Looking Glass Rock (5 miles southeast)
- Cold Mountain (6 miles north)
- Mount Pisgah (9.5 miles northeast)
- Mount Mitchell. On exceptionally clear days, Mount Mitchell, the highest point in the Eastern United States, is visible 45 miles north east.

== Gallery ==
View of summit of Black Balsam Knob covered by early morning spring haze.

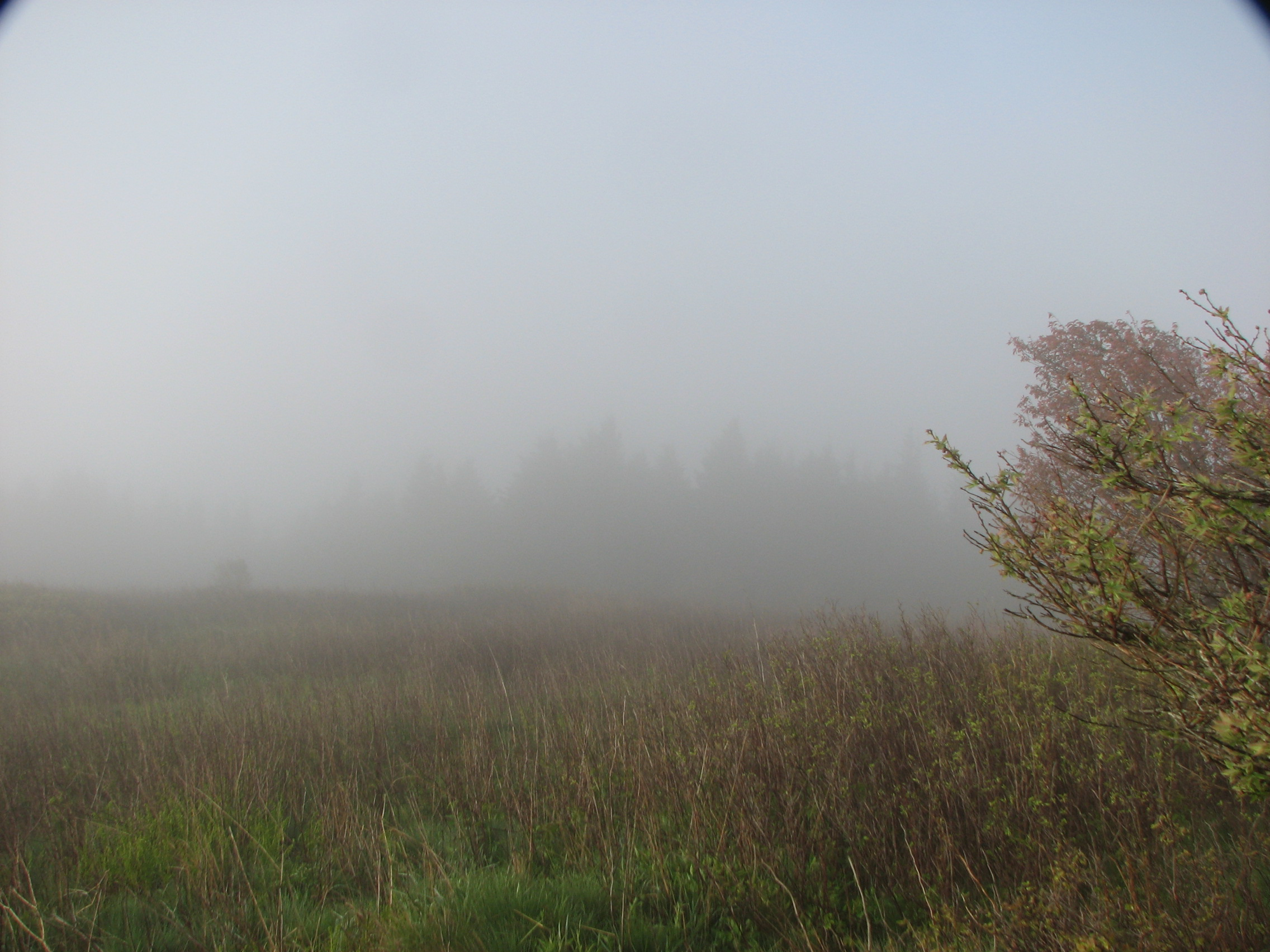
On summit of Black Balsam Knob during early morning spring haze.

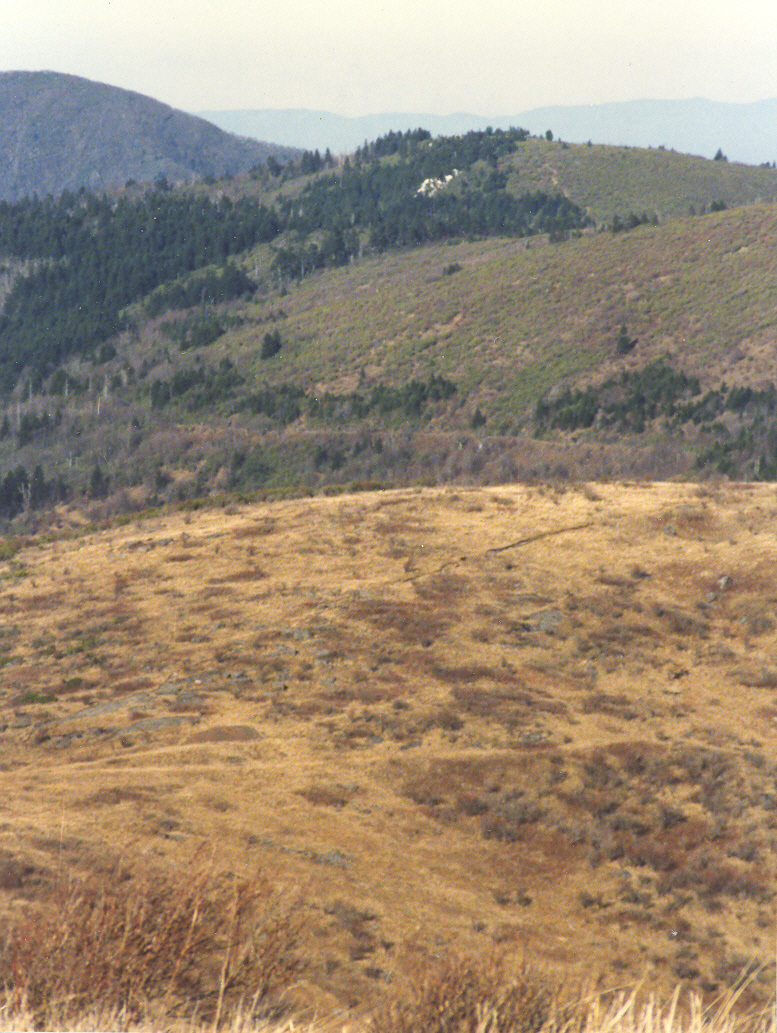
Shining Rock 3 miles in the distance as seen from Black Balsam Knob.

Looking Glass Rock 5 miles in the distance as seen from Black Balsam Knob.

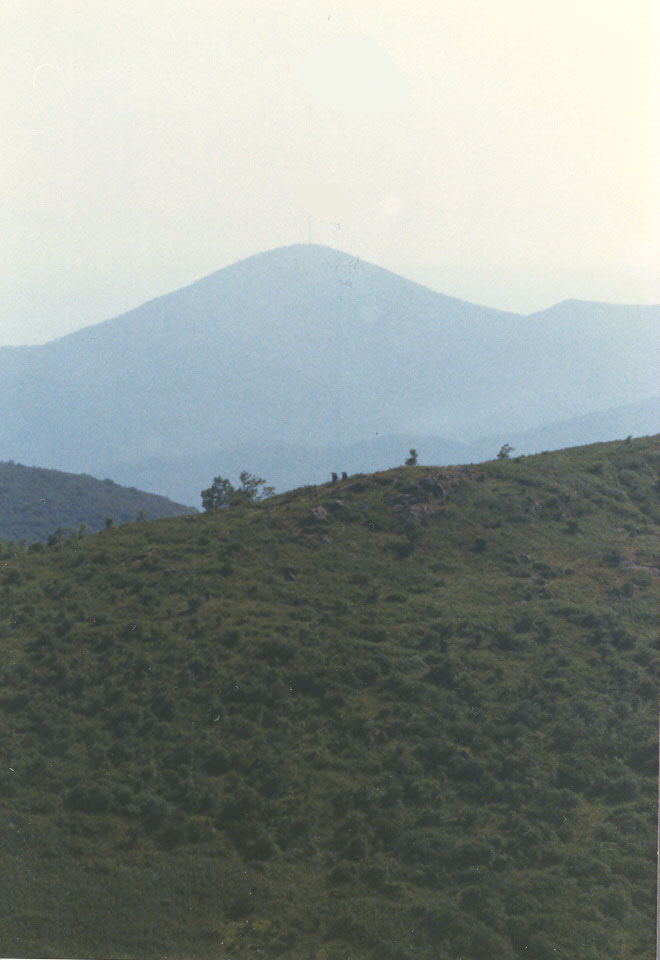
Mount Pisgah 9.5 miles in the distance as seen from Black Balsam Knob.

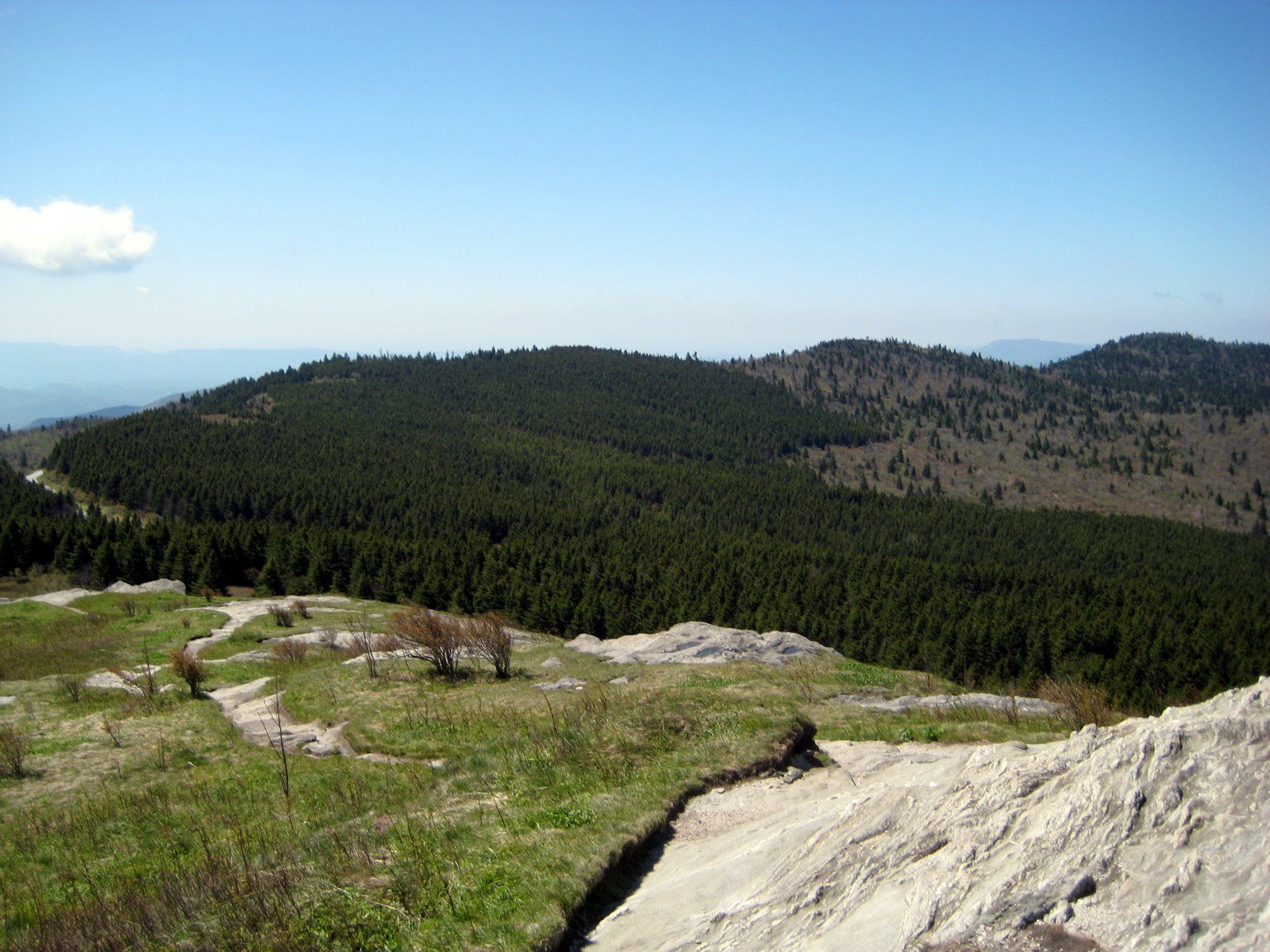
View from Black Balsam Knob

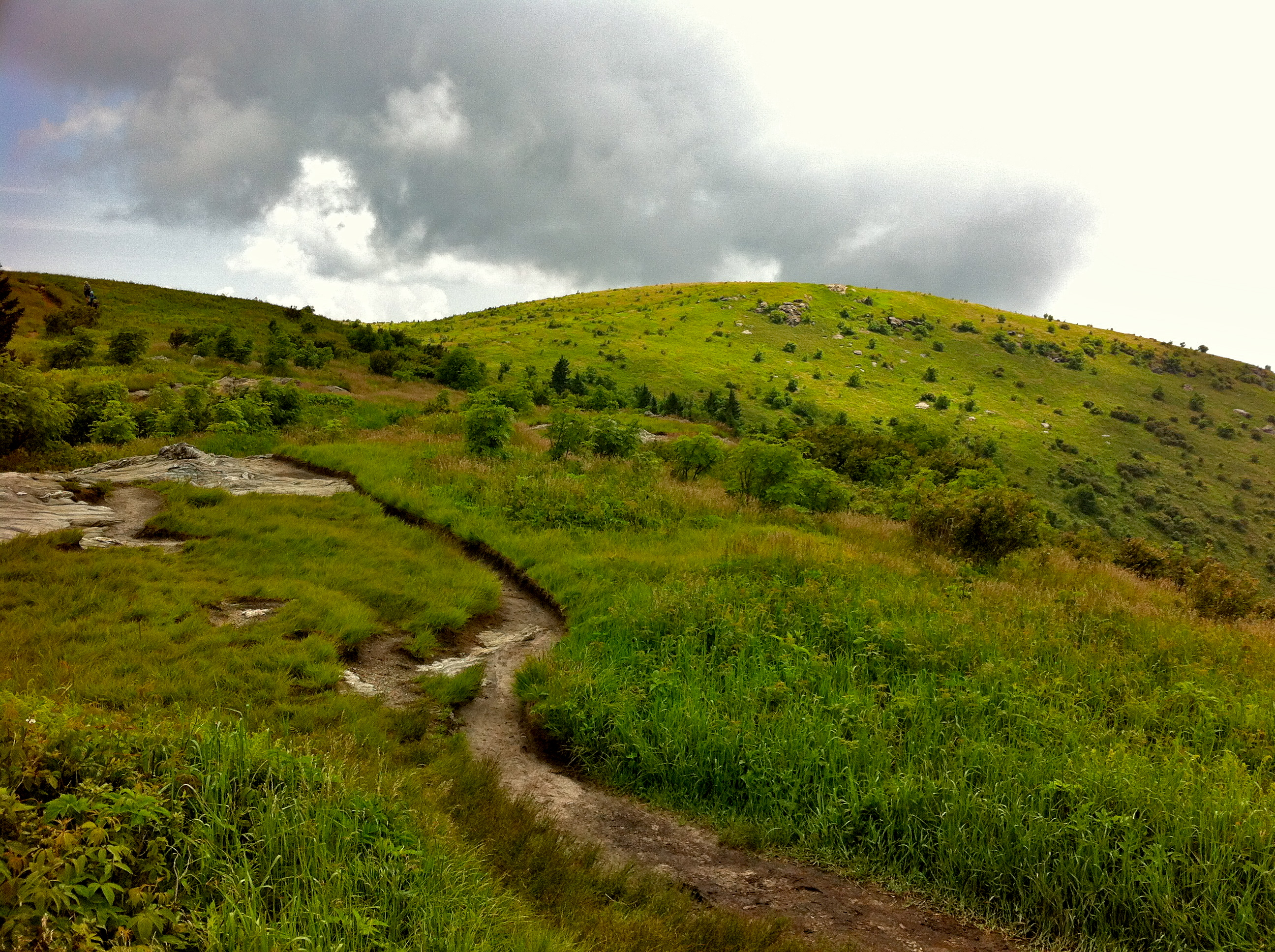
Summit of Black Balsam Knob

Balsam Knob Mountain area aerial footage by a drone.

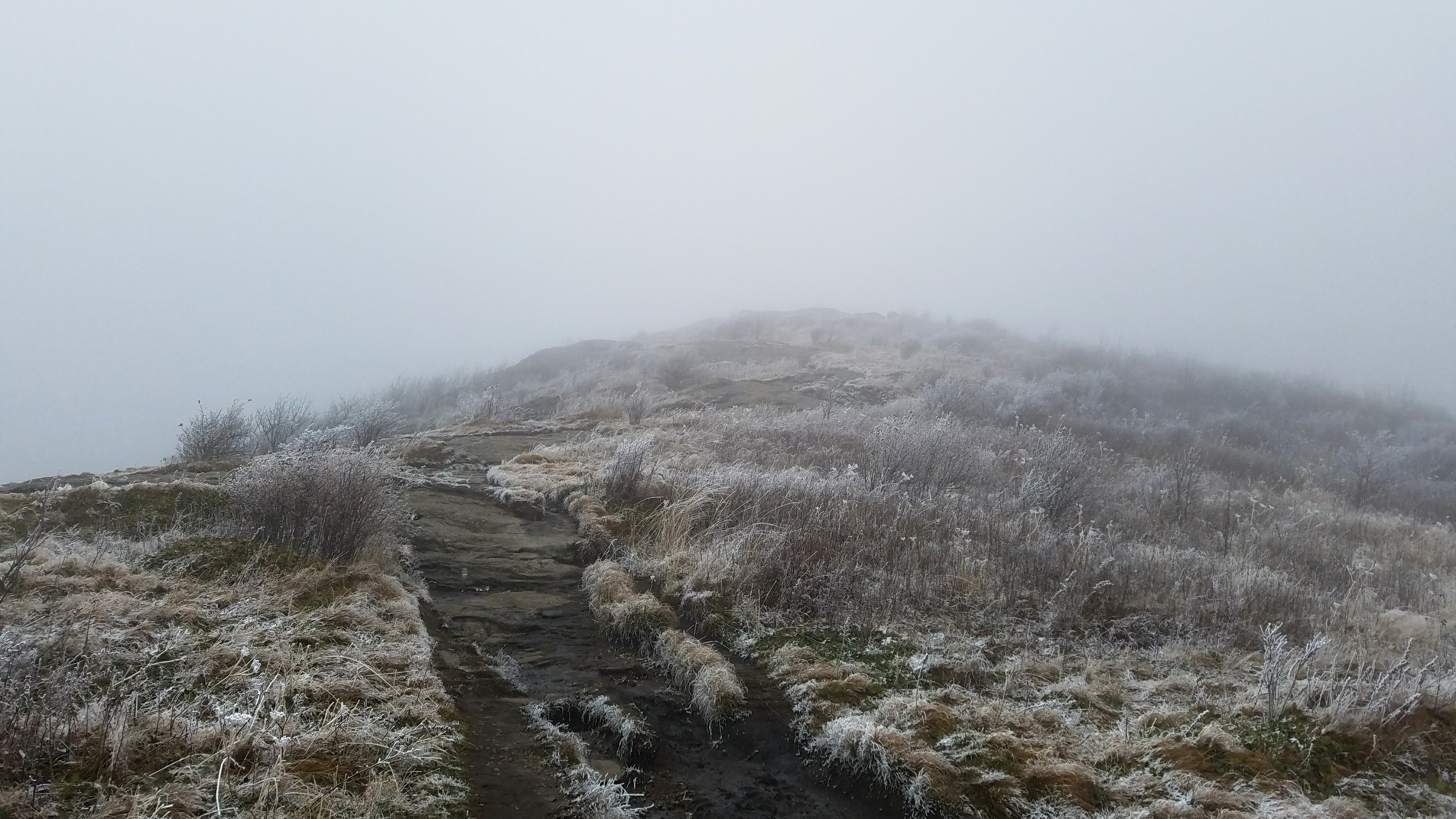
Black Balsam in the Fall

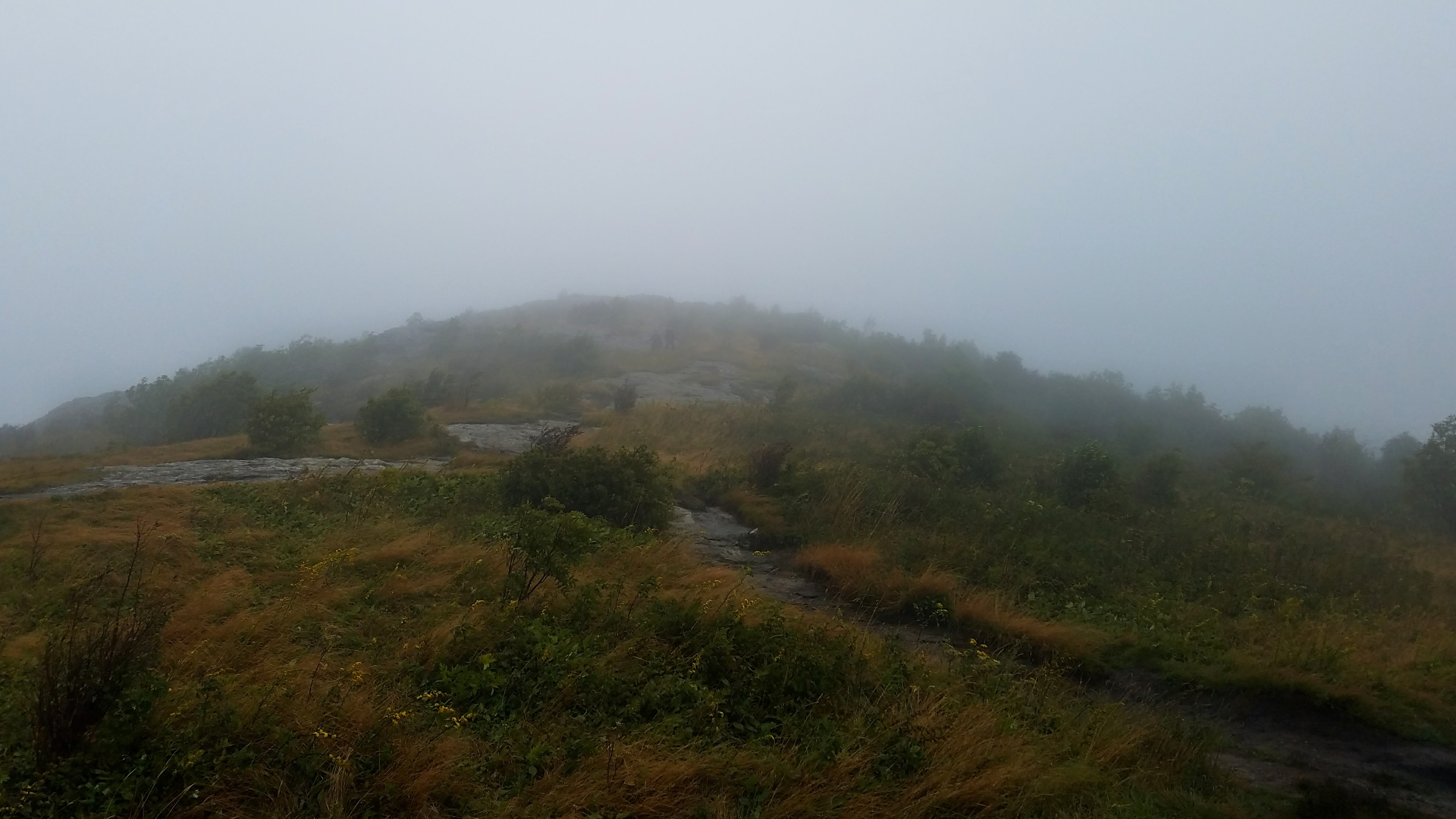
Black Balsam in late Summer

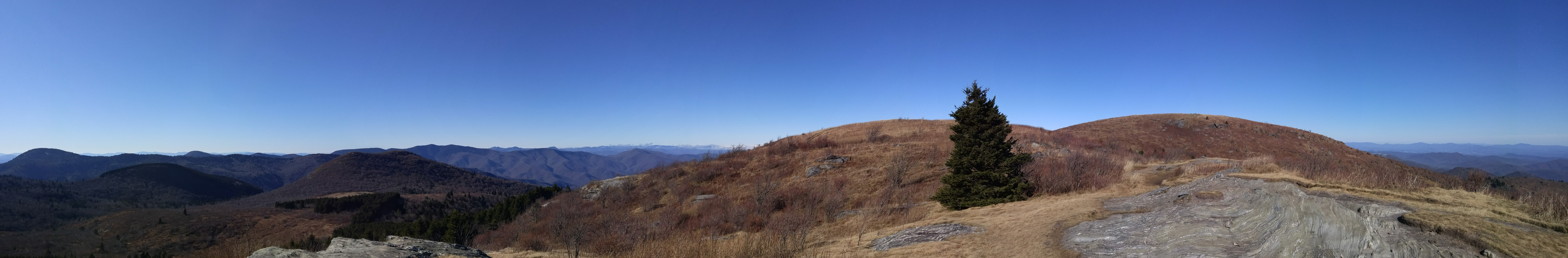
Panorama in the Fall

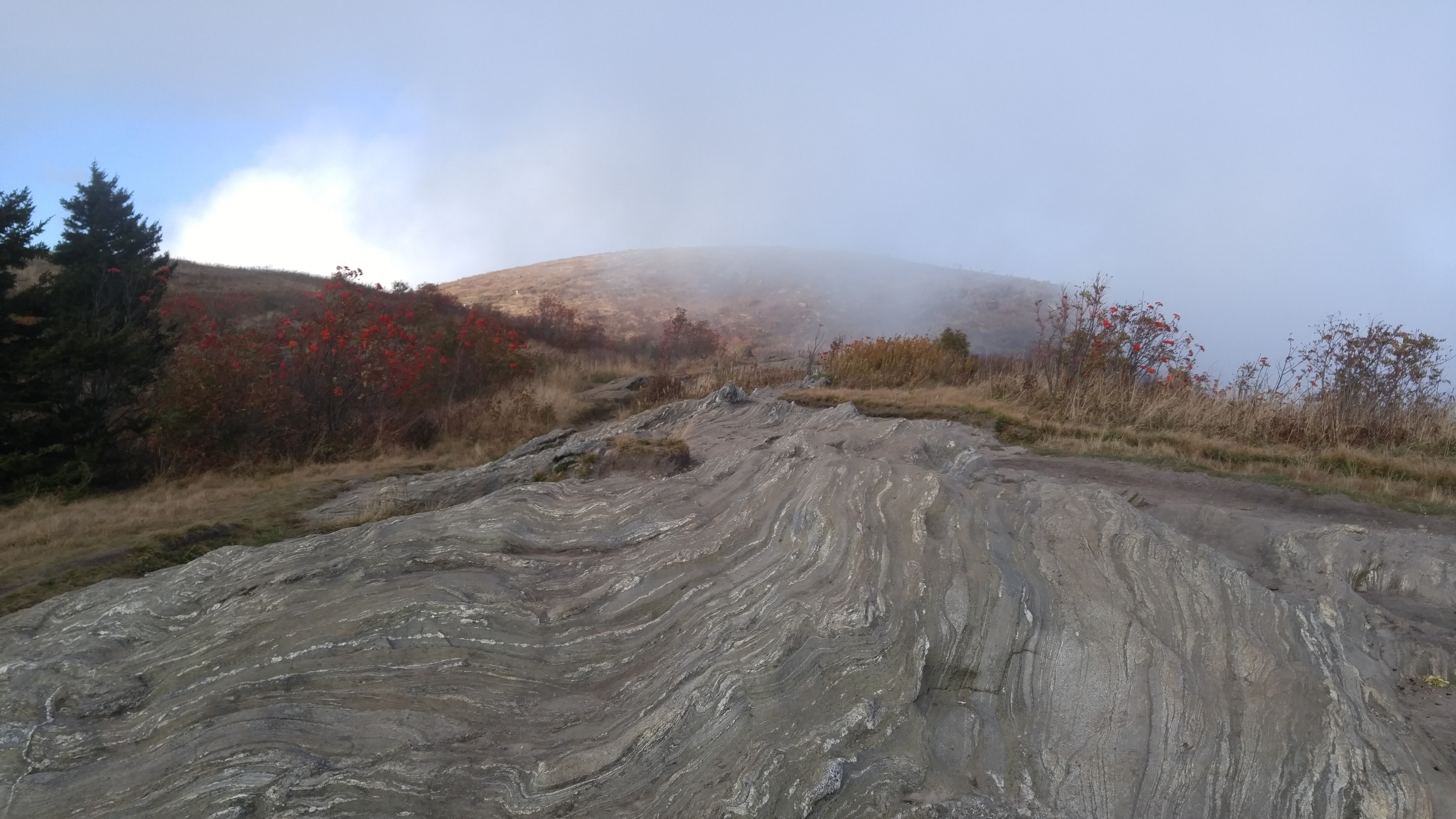
View at Black Balsam

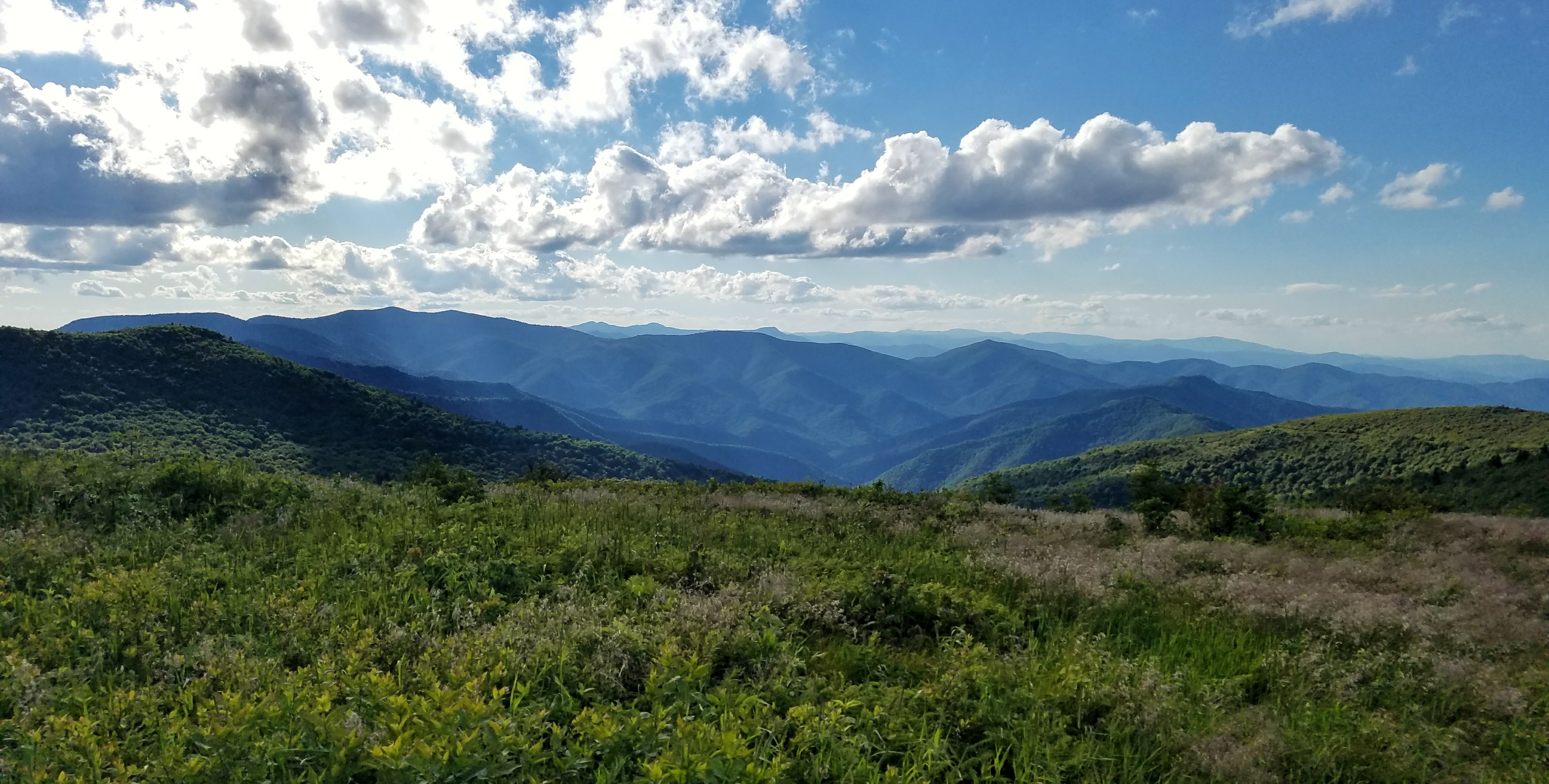
View from the peak of Black Balsam

== See also ==
- Art Loeb Trail
- Blue Ridge Parkway
- Pisgah National Forest
