= Great Balsam Mountains =

Mountain range in North Carolina, United States

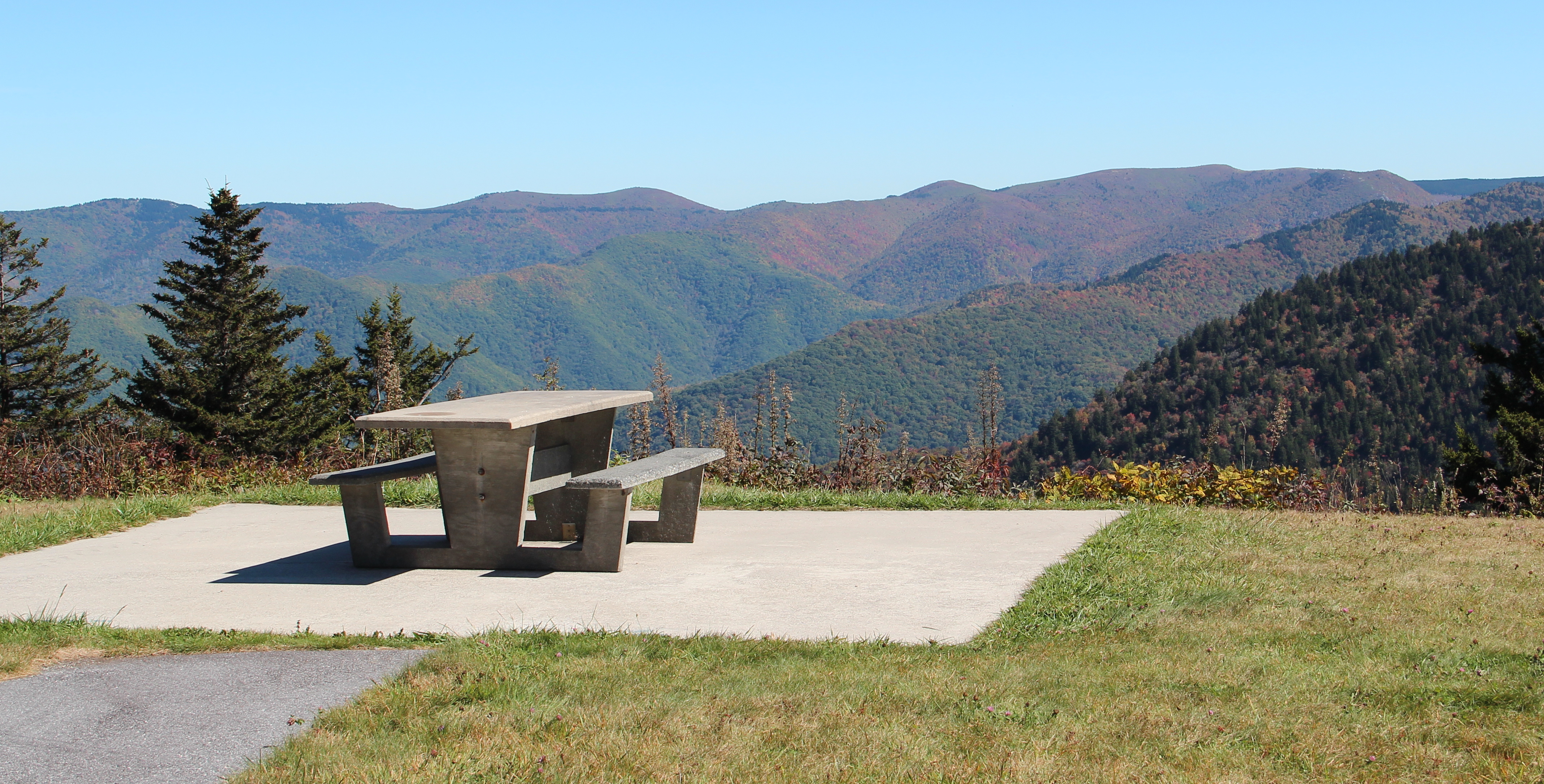
- Great Balsam Mountains as seen from the Blue Ridge Parkway

Highest point
- Peak: Richland Balsam
- Elevation: 6,410 ft (1,950 m)
- Coordinates: 35°22′N 82°59′W

Dimensions
- Length: 21 mi (34 km)
- Width: 18 mi (29 km)

Geography
- Country: United States
- State: North Carolina
- Parent range: Appalachian Mountains

Geology
- Rock type: gneiss

The Great Balsam Mountains, or Balsam Mountains, are in the mountain region of western North Carolina, United States. The Great Balsams are a subrange of the Blue Ridge Mountains, which in turn are a part of the Appalachian Mountains. The most famous peak in the Great Balsam range is Cold Mountain, which is the centerpiece of author Charles Frazier's bestselling novel Cold Mountain. Other notable peaks include Richland Balsam, which is the highest peak in the range, Black Balsam Knob, and Mount Pisgah.

The crest of the range is known as the Pisgah Ridge, and for the majority of its length forms the border between Haywood County to the north, Jackson County to the southwest, and Transylvania County to the southeast. The far eastern part of the range forms the border between Buncombe and Henderson Counties. Several towns are located in the valleys surrounding the range, including Brevard, Cullowhee, Waynesville, Canton, and the southwest suburbs of Asheville.

The Blue Ridge Parkway runs along its length and at Richland Balsam (milepost 431), the Parkway is at its highest point (6053 feet). Large portions of the range are part of Pisgah or Nantahala National Forest, making the area popular for recreation. The Middle Prong and Shining Rock Wildernesses are located in the center of the range and are both part of Pisgah National Forest. Several waterfalls are located in the range, such as Looking Glass Falls, Moore Cove Falls, and the waterfalls of Graveyard Fields.

== Peaks ==
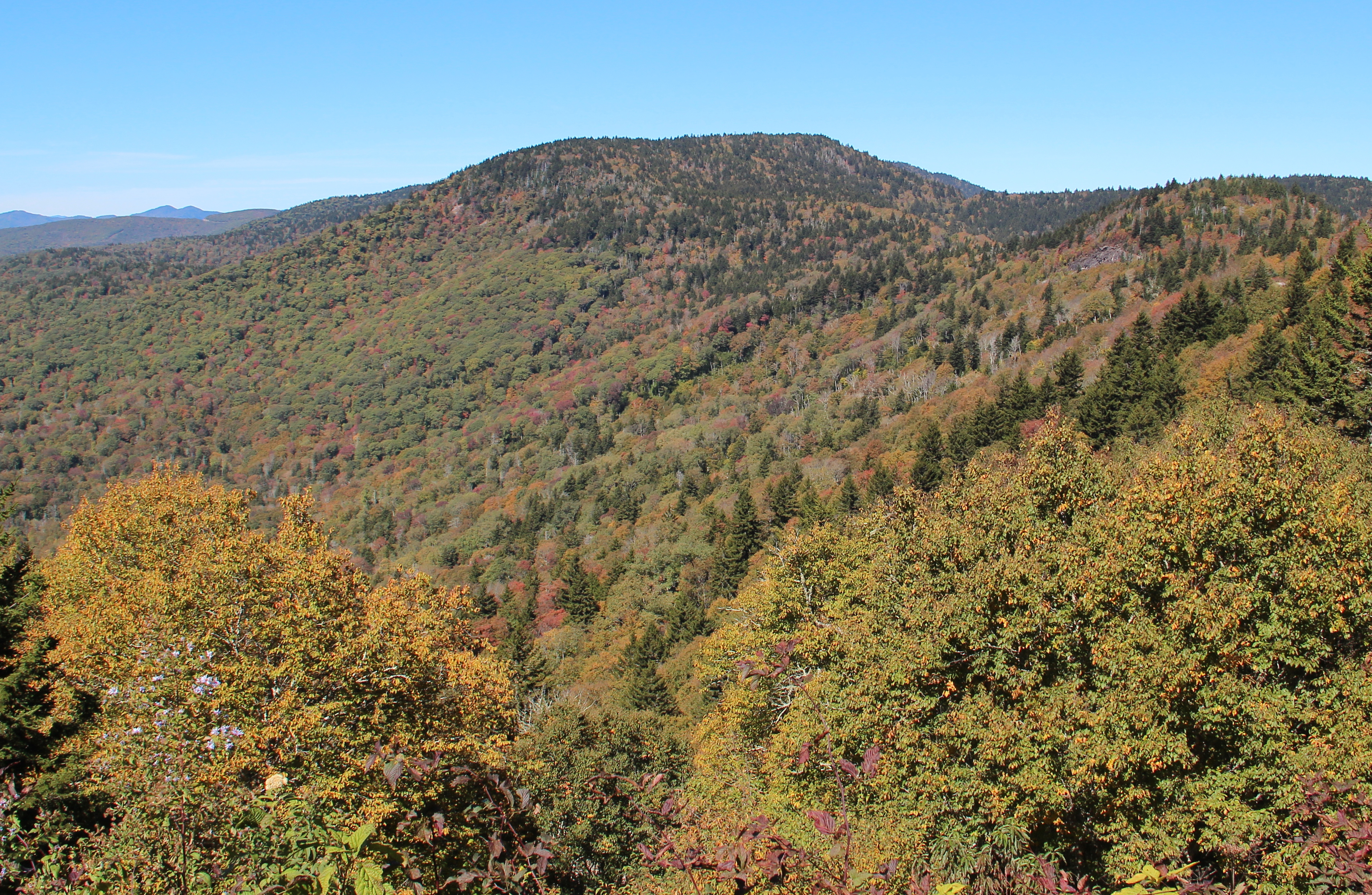
Reinhart Knob

- Richland Balsam – 6410 feet
- Black Balsam Knob – 6214 feet
- Mount Hardy – 6120 feet
- Reinhart Knob – 6080 feet
- Grassy Cove Top – 6040 feet
- Tennent Mountain – 6040 feet
- Sam Knob – 6040 feet
- Cold Mountain – 6030 feet
- Shining Rock – 6040 feet
- Chestnut Bald

("Mountain heights". Peakbagger.com.)

== Other landmarks ==
- Balsam Gap
- Devil's Courthouse
- Judaculla Rock (see Tsul 'Kalu; photos)
- Tanasee Bald (see Tsul 'Kalu)

== Flora ==
The area consists of a transition forest between the southern Appalachian spruce–fir forest (which resembles forest types found at northern latitudes) and the mixed deciduous forests of temperate America.

=== Trees ===
The following trees are at higher elevations:

- Fraser fir ("balsams" or "She balsams"). Forests of these trees appear black from a distance; however, these trees are declining due to the balsam woolly adelgid.
- Red spruce ("He balsams"). The red spruce is distinguished from the Fraser fir by having bark whose rosin cannot be milked (hence, "He balsams") and by having hanging cones.

=== Shrubs ===
- Catawba rhododendron
- Flame azalea
- Mountain laurel
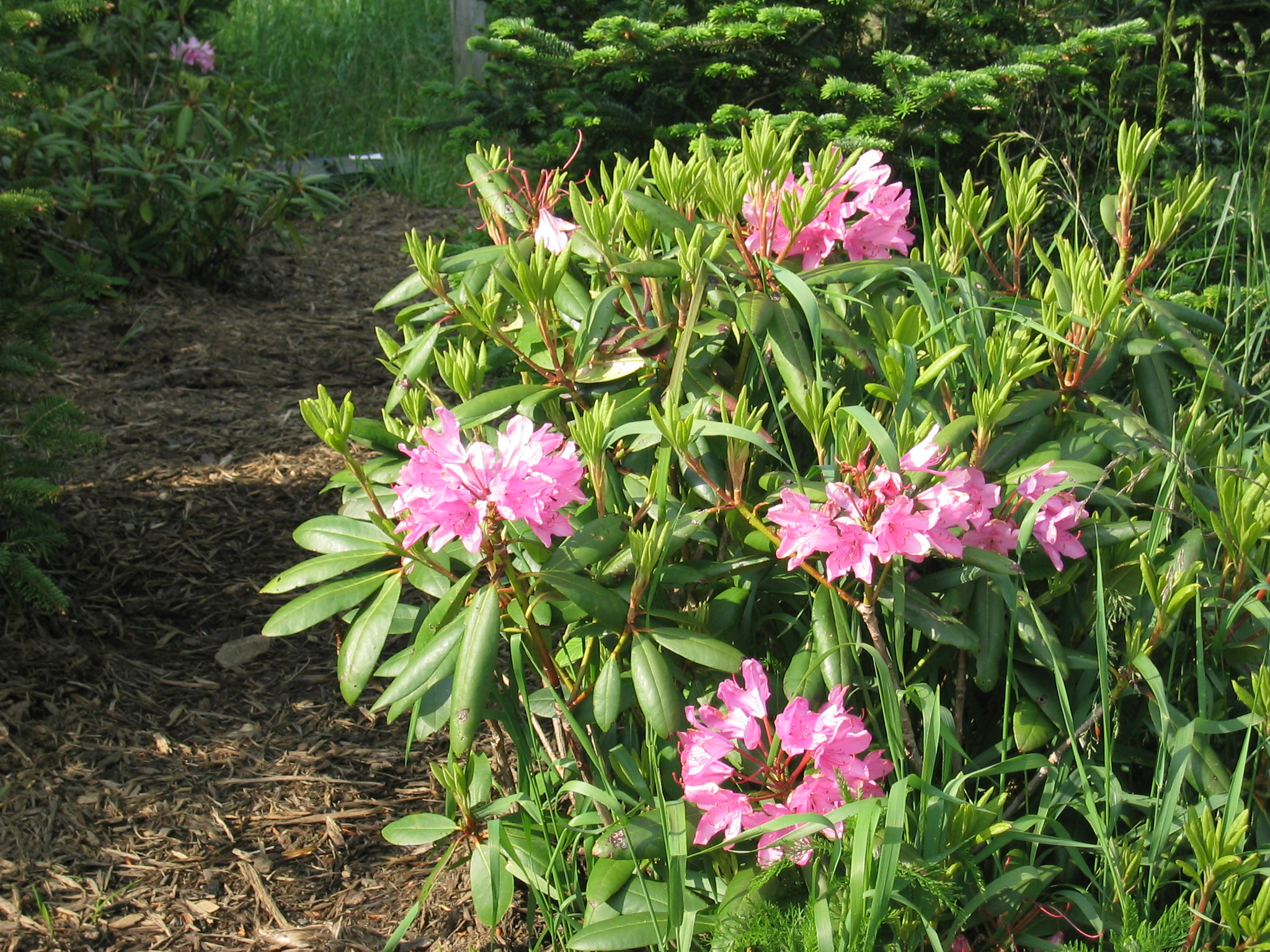
Rhododendron

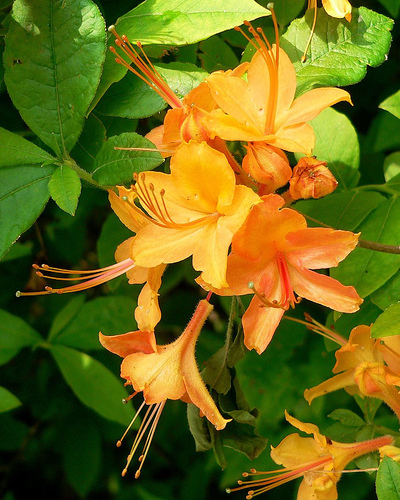
Flame azalea

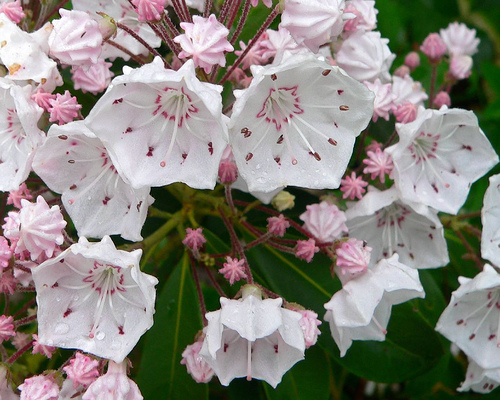
Mountain laurel

== See also ==
- List of mountains in North Carolina
