= Cold Mountain (opera) =

Opera composed by Jennifer Higdon

Cold Mountain is an American opera in two acts and an epilogue, with music by Jennifer Higdon and the libretto by Gene Scheer, based on Charles Frazier's 1997 novel of the same name. The opera is a co-commission among Santa Fe Opera, Opera Philadelphia and the Minnesota Opera, in collaboration with North Carolina Opera. The opera received its world premiere at Santa Fe Opera on 1 August 2015. This production coincided with the 150th anniversary of the ending of the American Civil War. Opera Philadelphia gave its first performance of the opera, in a slightly revised form, on 5 February 2016. North Carolina Opera gave the opera its home state premiere on 28 September 2017. The Minnesota Opera staged the opera in 2018 as part of its New Works Initiative. The Virginia Opera also featured performances of the opera during February 2021 as part of its themed "Love is a Battlefield" 2020–2021 season.

== Composition history ==
The original commission for Higdon to compose her first opera, in collaboration with Scheer as librettist, came from the San Francisco Opera. Over the period of 2009 to 2011, the creators had searched for various subjects to adapt, which led to the choice of the novel Cold Mountain. However, complications related to securing the rights to adapt the novel, along with conflicts over financial demands and reports of clashes of working style with San Francisco Opera with respect to the creation of new operas, led to the lapsing of this commission.

Santa Fe Opera subsequently rescued this commission, in conjunction with the Opera Company of Philadelphia (now Opera Philadelphia) and the Minnesota Opera. Scheer began to write the libretto in autumn 2011, and Higdon began to compose the music in 2012. Higdon used her personal background of having lived in the Appalachia region of the US to assist Scheer with rendering portions of his libretto in a style of speech more authentic to the region, when needed: "I helped Gene 'southernize' the libretto. Gene's from New York, and he wasn't sure how to shape the language for the characters, so I took care of it. Those speech patterns felt very familiar.

Scheer estimated that 20 to 25% of the sung text in his libretto came directly from lines in the novel. Higdon took 20 months to complete her score. Workshops of the opera at the Curtis Institute of Music occurred in December 2012 for act 1 and in December 2013 for act 2.

In advance of the premiere, four of the five scheduled Santa Fe Opera performances sold out. This led Santa Fe Opera to add one more performance. As well, Santa Fe Opera secured an agreement with the Dutch recording label Pentatone to produce a commercial recording of the opera, captured live from the Santa Fe Opera production. The director of the premiere production at Santa Fe Opera was Leonard Foglia, with set design by Robert Brill, lighting design by Brian Nason, costumes by David C. Woolard and projection design by Elaine J. McCarthy. Miguel Harth-Bedoya was the conductor.

With respect to Opera Philadelphia, Cold Mountain is part of the company's "American Repertoire Program", a ten-year commitment to produce a contemporary American work each season. For the second production of Cold Mountain, at Opera Philadelphia, Higdon and Scheer made modest revisions. In late January 2016, Nathan Gunn withdrew from the Opera Philadelphia production because of a family medical emergency. Jarrett Ott, the understudy for Inman in both the Santa Fe Opera and Opera Philadelphia rosters, stepped into the role of Inman for the Opera Philadelphia performances.

The Pentatone commercial recording of Cold Mountain was released in April 2016. It received two Grammy nominations. In May 2016, Cold Mountain was the winner in the category of World Premiere at the International Opera Awards in London.

In July 2019, Cold Mountain made its West Coast Premiere at the Music Academy of the West 2019 Summer Festival.

== Roles ==
Role	Voice type	Premiere cast, August 1, 2015 Conductor: Miguel Harth-Bedoya
Inman	baritone	Nathan Gunn
Ada	soprano	Isabel Leonard
Ruby	mezzo-soprano	Emily Fons
Teague	tenor	Jay Hunter Morris
Veasey	tenor	Roger Honeywell
Monroe / Pangle	baritone	Anthony Michaels-Moore
Stobrod / Blind Man	bass	Kevin Burdette
Lucinda	mezzo-soprano	Deborah Nansteel
Sara	soprano	Chelsea Basler
Reid	tenor	Roy Hage
Owens / Ethan	baritone	Robert Pomakov
Lila	soprano	Bridgette Gan
Katie	soprano	Heather Phillips
Olivia	mezzo-soprano	Shabnam Kalbasi
Claire	mezzo-soprano	Megan Marino
Junior / Charlie	tenor	Daniel Bates
Thomas	baritone	Tyler Putnam
Owens' Son	spoken role	Adrian Kramer
Laura (a drugged woman)	spoken role	Andrea Núñez
Birch	spoken role	Nicholas Ottersberg
Ada's Daughter	spoken role	Cadence Dennis

== Synopsis ==
In acts 1 and 2, the time of the opera is the American Civil War, 1865. The epilogue occurs 10 years after the close of act 2.

=== Act 1 ===
W.P. Inman, a Confederate soldier wounded at the Battle of Petersburg, decides to desert from the Confederate Army and return home to Ada Monroe, his beloved who lives at Black Cove Farm, in North Carolina. Inman is aware of the Home Guard, which hunts down deserters from the Confederate Army. The leader of the local Home Guard is Teague, who resorts to such practices as burying deserters alive.

On his journey home, Inman meets Solomon Veasey, whom he stops from committing murder. Meanwhile, Ada, once privileged, leads a life of material desperation. Ada meets Ruby, a mountain woman who teaches Ada about hunting and surviving.

Inman encounters Veasey again, near a river whilst fleeing the Home Guard, and bargains with him for passage across the river. However, their vessel capsizes and the two drift down the river. The next morning, Lila and her three sisters see Inman and Veasey. Lila's husband drugs the two men before giving them up to the Home Guard. Inman and Veasey are put on a chain gang of deserters.

Back at Black Cove Farm, Ruby finds her estranged father, Stobrod, a fiddler. Strobod is trying to steal food. Ruby wants nothing to do with her father, although he asserts that he has reformed his ways. Teague approaches, and Ruby hides her father. She later orders her father to stay away from her.

Inman starts an insurrection among the chain gang. The guards shoot the entire chain gang, with a wounded Inman as the only survivor, chained to six dead prisoners. He relives the day he bid Ada farewell, when he thought that the war would last but six months. Inman then loses consciousness.

=== Act 2 ===
Lucinda, a runaway slave, rifles through the pockets of the dead chain gang prisoners. Inman regains consciousness and awakens, which startles her. Lucinda frees Inman, who resumes his journey.

Back at Black Cove Farm, Stobrod and his traveling companion Pangle still rely upon Ruby and Ada for sustenance. Stobrod tries to convince Ruby that he is a changed man, but Ruby remains skeptical.

Inman meets Sara, a war widow, who is trying to comfort her baby. Inman helps her, gains her trust, and is invited to spend the night.

At Black Cove Farm, Teague appears, with a copy of the newspaper that lists the names of deserters, on which Ruby sees her father's name.

The next morning, Inman and Sara react quickly when Union soldiers appear.

At a campfire in the woods, Teague and his men confront Stobrod and Pangle, shoot them and leave them for dead. Ada finds the two men, and expresses compassion for Stobrod ("I feel sorry for you").

Ada later goes hunting in the woods. There, she and Inman reunite. The other characters whom Inman has encountered on his odyssey appear to Inman, and urge him to tell Ada about his adventures ("Tell her of the slave you met"; "Tell her how the boat went down"). The couple affirms their pledge to each other. Teague continues his pursuit. Ada and Inman consummate their love, on their final night together. Eventually, Teague and the Home Guard track down Inman. In the final battle, Inman is killed.

=== Epilogue ===
Nine years later, Ada is at her farm, with her child by Inman.

== See also ==
- List of compositions by Jennifer Higdon
