= Heather Phillips =

American operatic soprano

- Born: United States
- Education: University of Cincinnati – College-Conservatory of Music
- Occupation: Operatic soprano
- Website: www.heatherphillipssoprano.com

Heather Phillips is an American operatic coloratura soprano. She began her career at the Santa Fe Opera where she created there the role of Katie in Jennifer Higdon's Cold Mountain in 2015. She made her European debut at the Oper Frankfurt in 2022 in the title role of Rossini's Bianca e Falliero.

== Life and career ==
Phillips studied at the University of Cincinnati – College-Conservatory of Music, obtaining both Bachelor and Master of Arts diplomas. She was a member of the Santa Fe Opera's studio, appearing as Sardula in Menotti's The Last Savage and as Contessa in Rossini's Il viaggio a Reims. She joined the company for a year in 2014, performing roles such as Frasquita in Bizet's Carmen and Gilda in Verdi's Rigoletto. She created there the role of Katie in Jennifer Higdon's Cold Mountain in 2015. Phillips performed as Konstanze in Mozart's Die Entführung aus dem Serail at the Opera in New Orleans, and as Elvira in Rossini's L'italiana in Algeri at the Lyric Opera of Kansas City.

In concert, she appeared with orchestras including the New York Philharmonic, the Austin Symphony Orchestra and the Canton Symphony Orchestra.

Phillips made her European debut at the Oper Frankfurt in 2022 in the title role of Rossini's Bianca e Falliero, alongside Beth Taylor as Falliero, directed by Tilmann Köhler and conducted by Giuliano Carella. The work had been planned for 2020, and in collaboration with the Tirol Festival in Erl, to conclude a focus of Rossini's works.

A reviewer from the Frankfurter Allgemeine Zeitung described her beginning of "Da un istante, da un momento" in a quartet tenderly like a silver thread. He wrote that she portrayed her character's development from a naive girl to a suffering victim of power, with the pathos of Greek tragedy, and finally to a disillusioned self-determined woman, with a delicate voice full of nuances, and shining in ensembles. Another reviewer noted her precise and flexible coloraturas, serving to portray the development of her characters.
