= Beth Taylor =

Scottish operatic mezzo-soprano

- Born: 13 October 1993 (age 33); Glasgow, Scotland
- Education: Royal Conservatoire of Scotland
- Occupation: Operatic mezzo-soprano

Beth Taylor is a Scottish operatic mezzo-soprano, who has performed mainly in Europe. At the Oper Frankfurt, she performed a title role in Rossini's Bianca e Falliero.

== Life ==
Born in Glasgow, Taylor studied at the Royal Conservatoire of Scotland, graduating as Master of Arts in 2018. She has been coached by Jennifer Larmore. She achieved first prize at the Gianni Bergamo Classic Music Award in 2018, and third prize of the Wigmore Hall's competition. She attended the Samling Institute for Young Artists in 2019.

Taylor appeared as Arnalta in Monteverdi's L’incoronazione di Poppea with the Longborough Festival Opera in 2018, as Marcellina in Mozart's Le nozze di Figaro at the New Generation Festival in Florence in 2019, and as Bradamante in Handel's Alcina at the Opéra de Dijon and the Opéra national de Lorraine in Nancy in 2020. Taylor appeared at the Oper Frankfurt first in 2021 as Dardano in Handel's Amadigi. Her mezzo-soprano was the only lower voice, and a reviewer said that she portrayed her character with fine vocal lines and remarkable coloratura She returned in 2022 as Falliero in Rossini's Bianca e Falliero, directed by Tilmann Köhler and conducted by Giuliano Carella. The work had been planned for 2020, and in collaboration with the Tirol Festival in Erl, to conclude a focus of Rossini's works. A reviewer noted her full voice, with volume in the middle register, precise and flexible coloraturas, and dramatic outbursts, portraying the fall of the character from a victor in battle to giving himself up, in duets of great harmony with Heather Phillips as Bianca.

In concert, she has appeared with orchestras including the Royal Scottish National Orchestra, the Netherlands Radio Symphony Orchestra, Il Pomo d'Oro and La Cetra Barockorchester Basel.

In June 2023 Taylor was a finalist in the Cardiff Singer of the World competition.
