= Cold Mountain (North Carolina) =

Mountain in North Carolina, US

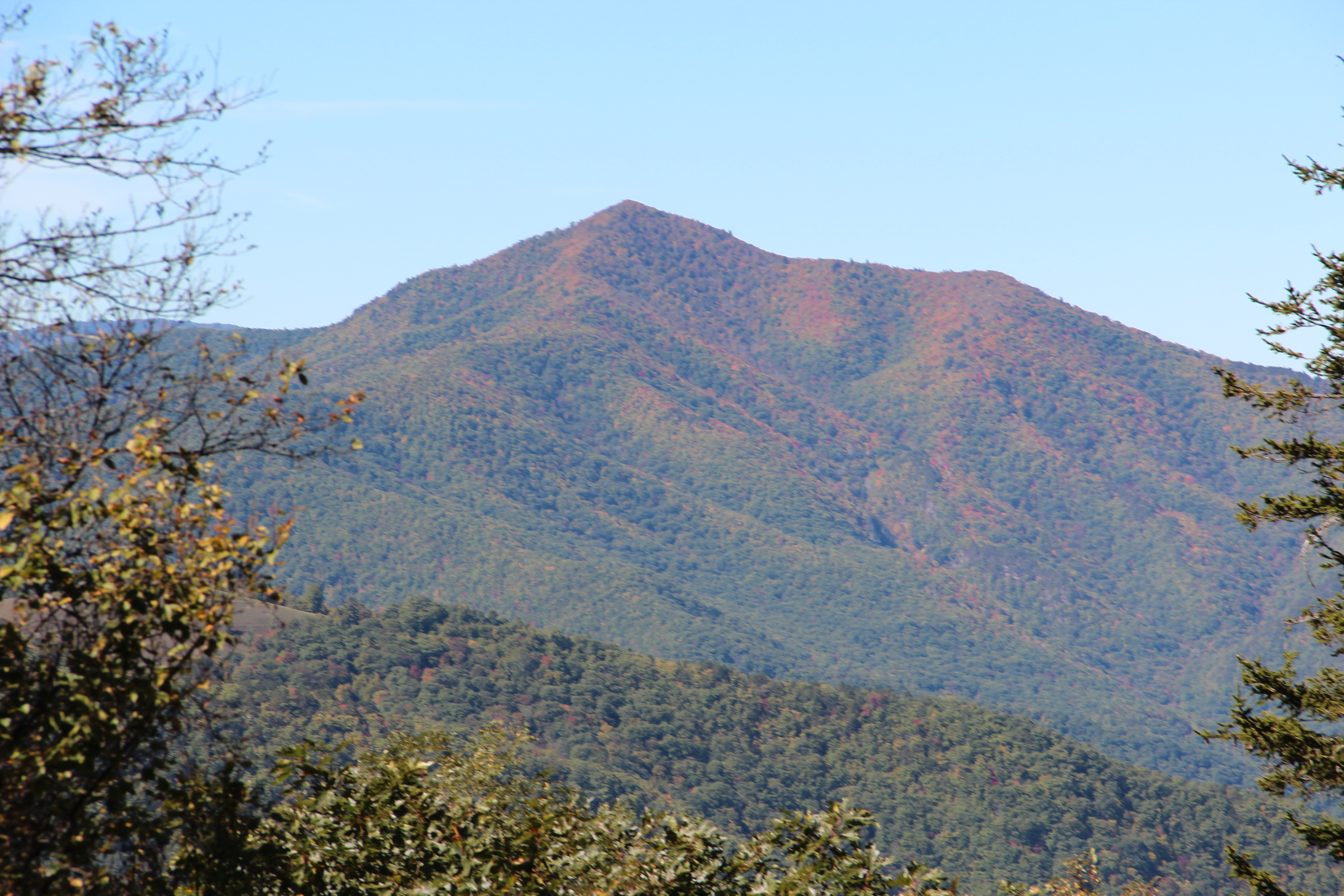
- Cold Mountain as seen from the Blue Ridge Parkway

Highest point
- Elevation: 6,030 ft (1,840 m)
- Prominence: 990 ft (300 m)
- Coordinates: 35°24′34″N 82°51′22″W

Geography
- Location: Haywood County, North Carolina, U.S.
- Parent range: Great Balsam Mountains
- Topo map: USGS Cruso

Climbing
- Easiest route: Hike

Cold Mountain falls in the mountain region of western North Carolina, United States. The mountain is one of the Great Balsam Mountains which are a part of the Blue Ridge Mountains within the Appalachian Mountains. Cold Mountain and the Shining Rock Wilderness surrounding it are part of Pisgah National Forest.

Cold Mountain is about 15 miles (24 kilometers) southeast of Waynesville and 35 miles (56 kilometers) south of Asheville. It rises to 6,030 feet (1,840 m) above sea level and is the 40th tallest mountain in the eastern United States. The peak is accessible only via an extremely strenuous branch of the Art Loeb Trail with a 10.6 miles (17.1 km) round trip and an elevation change of 2,800 feet (850 m).

The vast majority of Cold Mountain falls within federal lands of the Shining Rock Wilderness of the Pisgah National Forest. However portions of the mountain, including approximately 800 acres (324 ha) of northwestern Cold Mountain in Panther Branch, are privately owned. There are about 15 residences on the northwest side of the mountain, and maintenance of access roads is funded by property owners.

In 2016 the Southern Appalachian Highland Conservancy purchased the 162 acres (66 ha) Dix Creek tract from private owners. The land was transferred to the N.C. Wildlife Resources Commission in late October 2016 and will increase the adjoining Cold Mountain Game Lands to 3,500 acres (1,416 ha) in 2017.

== History ==
The region was originally inhabited by Indigenous peoples of the Southeastern Woodlands where prehistoric platform mounds were constructed during the periods of the Woodland and South Appalachian Mississippian cultures, who were ancestors to the Cherokee people. The Mississippian culture was influential here beginning about 1000 CE.

Much of the Forest was later owned by George Washington Vanderbilt II, builder of the Biltmore Estate. After his death, his widow sold the land that included the mountain to the United States Forest Service at $5 an acre to help create the Pisgah National Forest as the first National Forest in the eastern United States.

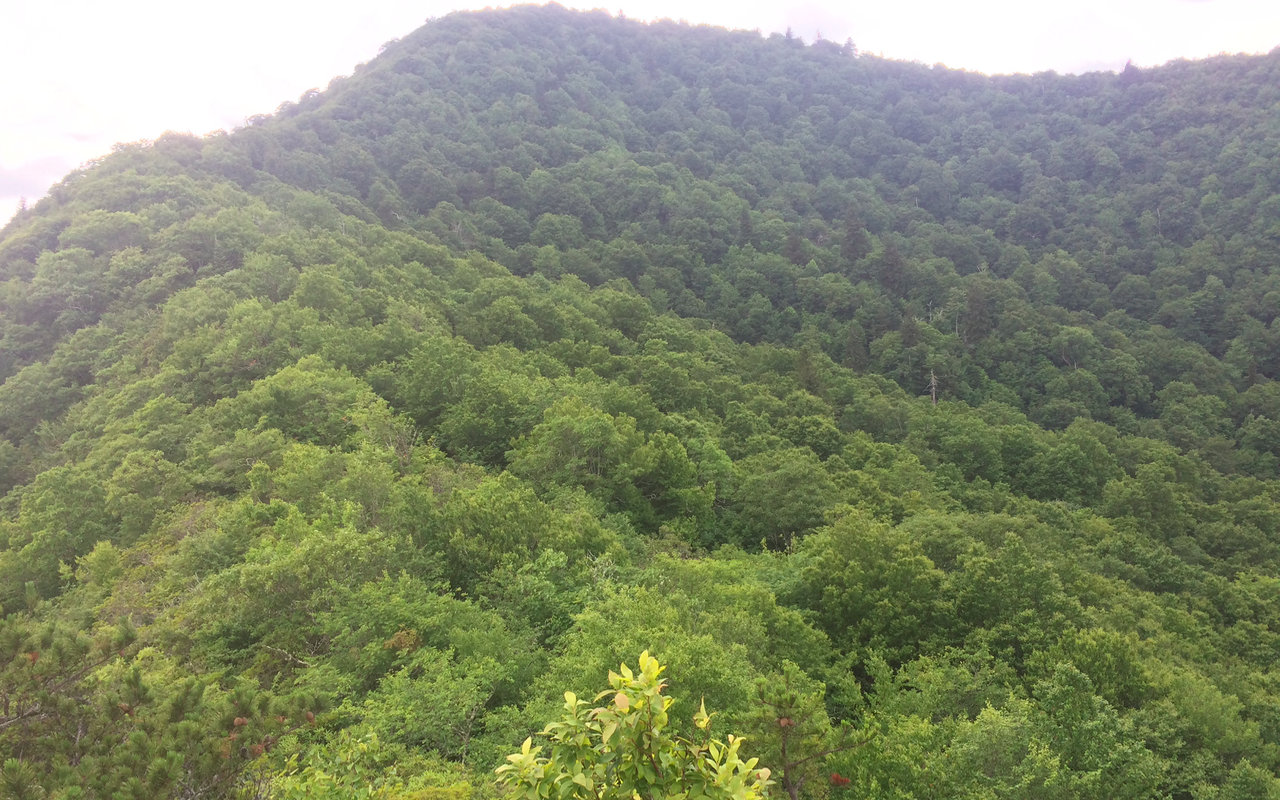
Cold Mountain

== In popular culture ==
The mountain and the township Community of Bethel area outside of Canton near the base of Cold Mountain was made famous as the story location in the 1997 novel Cold Mountain by Charles Frazier.

A film based on the novel was distributed by Miramax Films in 2003. The movie was actually filmed in the Carpathian Mountains of Romania. A Miramax Films spokesperson cited higher production costs; however, director Anthony Minghella had said that the lack of old-growth forests and period buildings as well as the lack of dependable snowfall were the primary reasons he chose not to film in North Carolina. A 2015 opera production followed.

Legends, Tales, & History of Cold Mountain (Volumes I–VI) is a six-volume series of The Pigeon Valley Heritage Collection. The books are authored by Evelyn M. Coltman and are distributed by the Bethel Rural Community Organization. In 2012, the six volumes were awarded the Barringer Award of Excellence by the North Carolina Society of Historians.

== See also ==
- List of mountains in North Carolina
