= Art Loeb Trail =

Long-distance hiking trail in the United States

Coordinates: 35.2784403°N 82.8662413°W

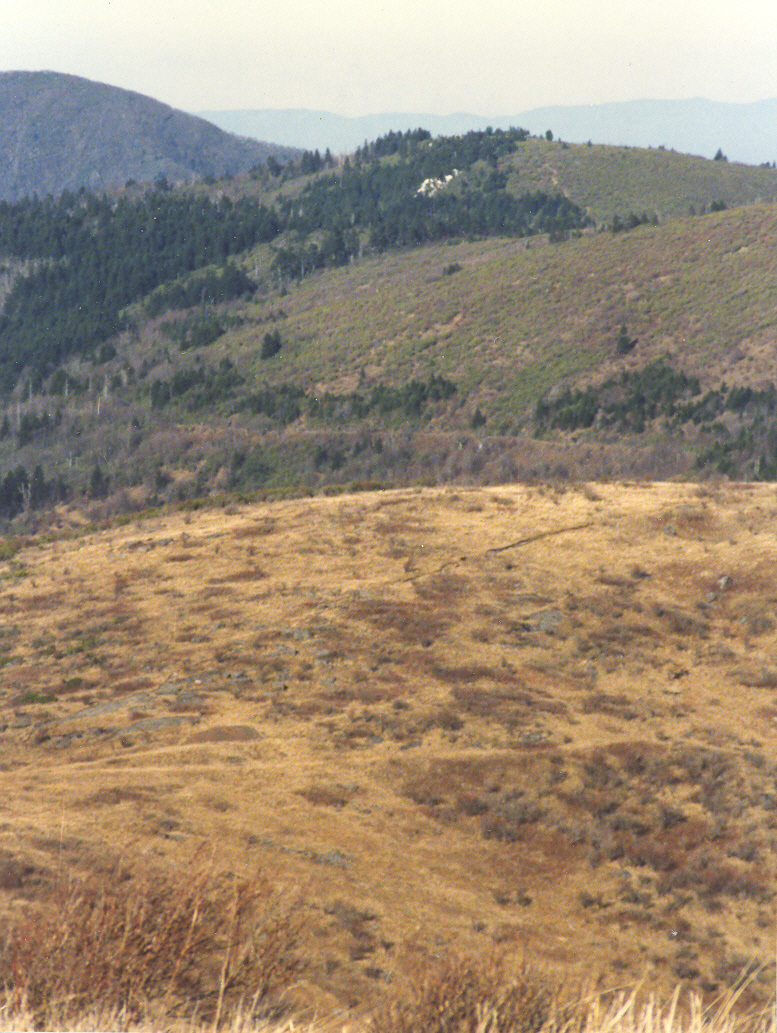
- The Art Loeb Trail across four 6,000 foot mountains With around 10,000ft of elevation gain. The view is from Black Balsam Knob, then the trail goes over the bald of Tennent Mountain. In the distance the trail is on the west slope of Shining Rock. To the left of Shining Rock is Cold Mountain.
- Length: 30.1 mi (48.4 km)
- Location: Pisgah National Forest, Shining Rock Wilderness, North Carolina, United States
- Trailheads: Davidson River Campground, Daniel Boone Boy Scout Camp
- Use: Hiking
- Highest point: Black Balsam Knob, 6,214 ft (1,894 m)
- Lowest point: Davidson River
- Difficulty: Difficult (strenuous with technical sections).
- Season: All
- Sights: Panoramic views, including views of Looking Glass Rock.
- Hazards: rocky sections, steep grades, sections with no blaze.
- Surface: rock, dirt, hardpack.

Location
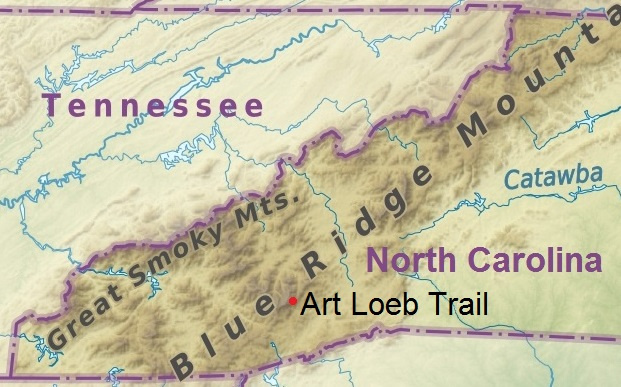
- The Art Loeb Trail is in the western region of North Carolina in Pisgah National Forest

The Art Loeb Trail is a 30.1-mile (48.4 km) hiking trail located in Pisgah National Forest in Western North Carolina. The northern terminus is at the Daniel Boone Boy Scout Camp in Haywood County, while the trail's southern terminus is located near the Davidson River Campground, near Brevard, in Transylvania County. Along the way, the trail traverses several significant peaks, including Black Balsam Knob (6,214 ft), Tennent Mountain (6040 ft) and Pilot Mountain (5095 ft). The trail also passes the base of Cold Mountain, made famous by the novel and film. National Geographic Adventure listed the trail as one of the thirty best North American hikes. They praised the views offered on the high Appalachian Balds, the challenging climbs, and the trail's diverse landscape.

== History ==
Originally part of the Cherokee Nation, the area was heavily logged in the early part of the 20th century. The Art Loeb Trail was dedicated on November 9, 1969. It was named after an avid hiker and Carolina Mountain Club member, who resided in Brevard. Mr. Loeb often explored and cared for the area. Extensive logging and locomotive fires in 1925 and 1942 are the cause for the expansive, open views around Black Balsam Knob.

== Animals, plants, and geology ==
There is a variety of birds, reptiles and mammals in the area. Deer, rattlesnakes, rabbits, black bears and bobcats may be spotted by the watchful hiker. While most of the spruce and fir was removed by logging, there are areas where these trees are encountered on the trail. There are significant differences in the landscape from the southern end of the trail compared to the higher elevations.

Along the way, the hiker encounters some unique geology. From Pilot Mountain, there's a view of the Looking Glass Rock pluton. Close to Butter Gap is Cedar Rock, a large granite outcropping. In addition, Shining Rock and its cluster of quartz boulders can be encountered via a side trail.

== Activities ==
The trail sees many hikers taking advantage of the trail's proximity to the Blue Ridge Parkway and Asheville, in addition to literary enthusiasts exploring Cold Mountain. Hikers around in the northern part of the trail in the Shining Rock Wilderness should be prepared, as the trails are not marked, and there are no signs.

South of Ivestor Gap the trail is outside of the Shining Rock Wilderness, and contains blazes and signs to help with navigation. The trail also shares with the Mountains-to-Sea Trail for a short stretch in the Silvermine Bald area. There are also several side trails that connect to the Art Loeb, including the optional climb up Cold Mountain.

Challenges for the hiker include steep ascents and descents, exposed hiking on high Appalachian Balds, and few water supply points. It is recommended to have a life straw and gravity filter to maximize the minimal water supply points.

To complete the entire trail, most guides recommend either three or four days. There are several backcountry camp spots throughout the trail, with primitive shelters at Deep Gap and Butter Gap. Starting in 2001, an adventure run of the entire trail is held on the Winter Solstice.

== Intersecting trails ==
The Art Loeb Trail intersects with several trails, Mountains-to-Sea Trail, Farlow Gap, Butter Gap Trail, the Estatoe Trail, and others.

== Photo gallery ==
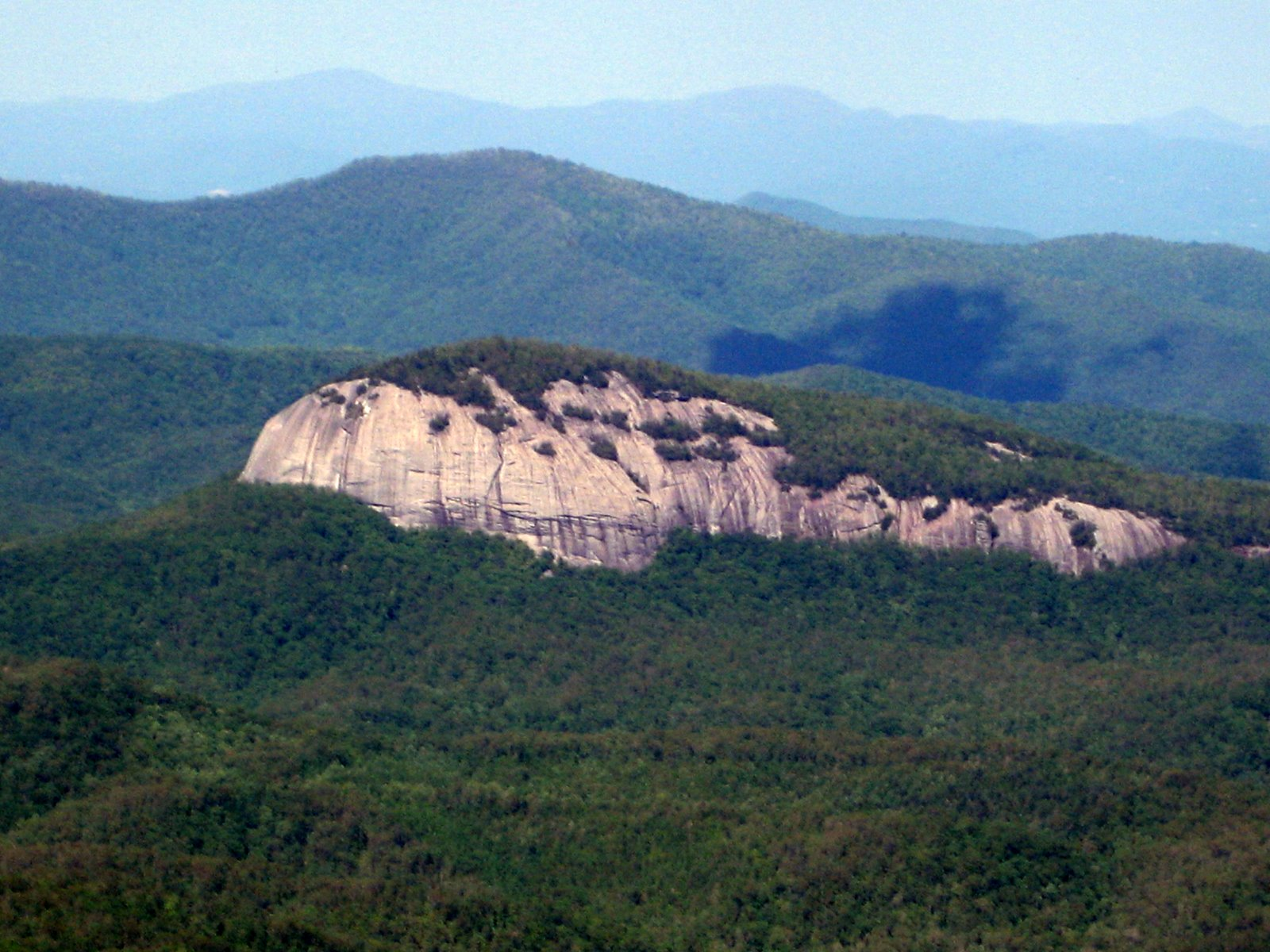
Looking Glass Rock from Pilot Mountain

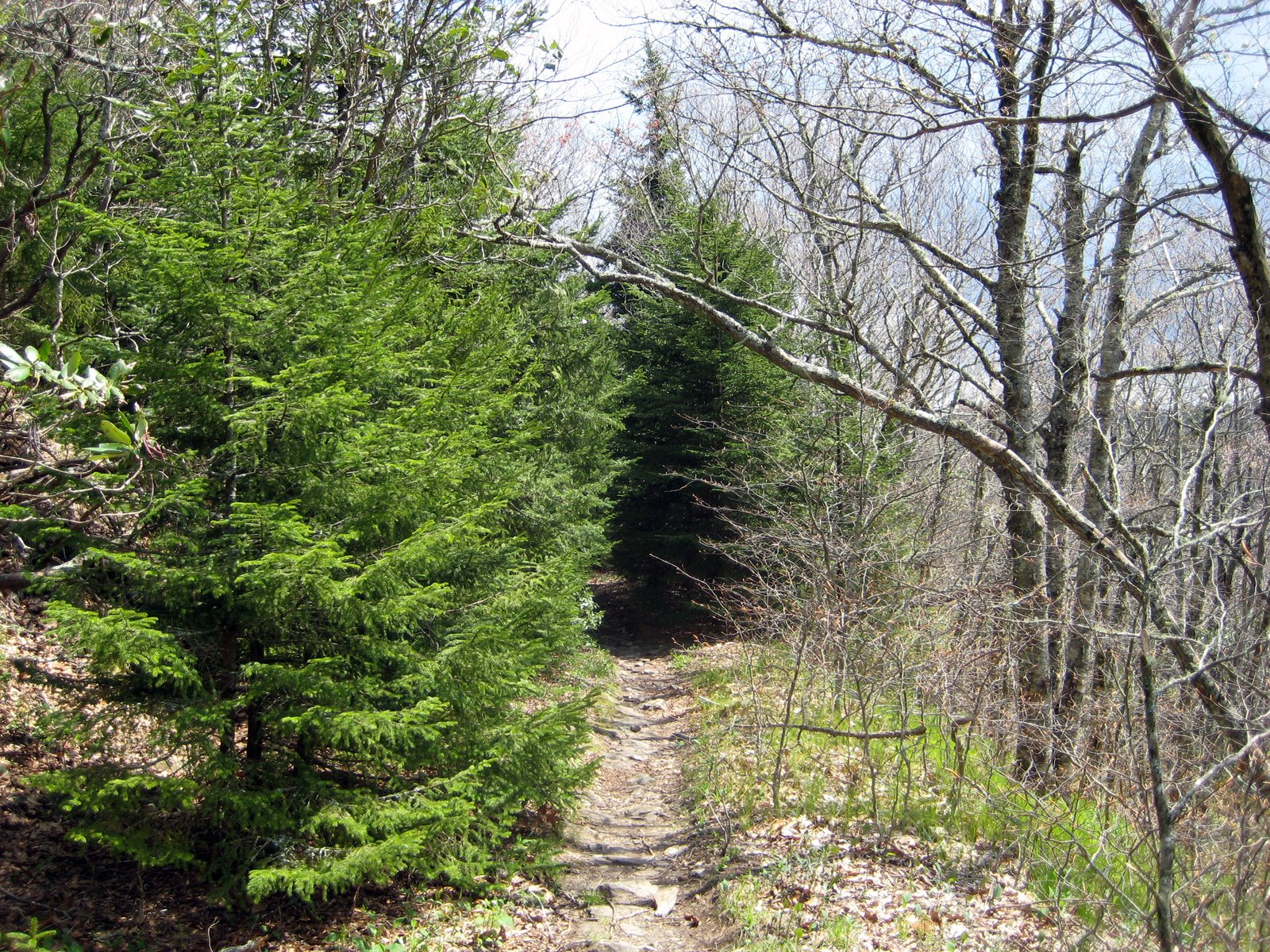
Spruce trees on the Art Loeb Trail

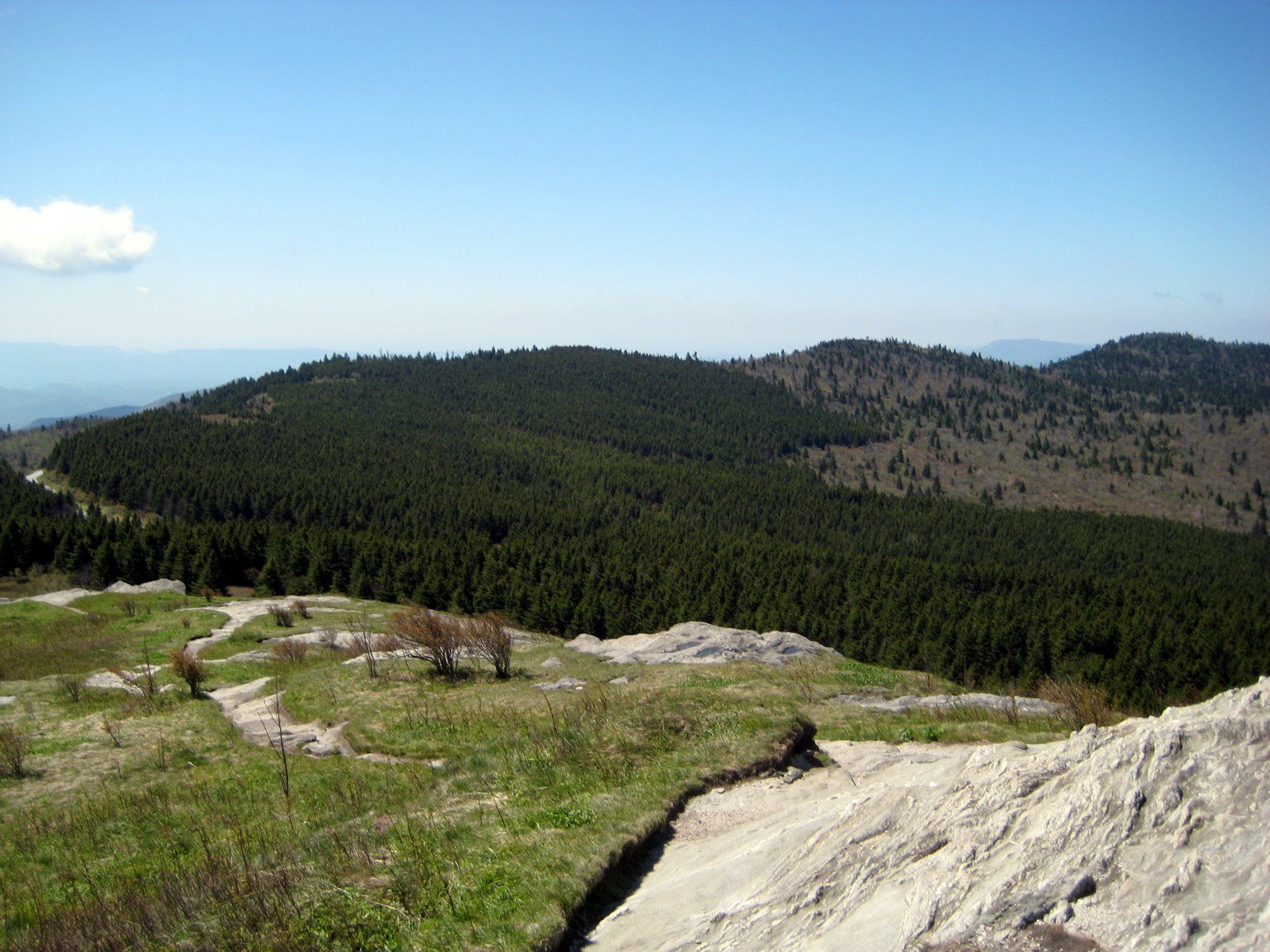
View from the southern sub-peak of Black Balsam Knob

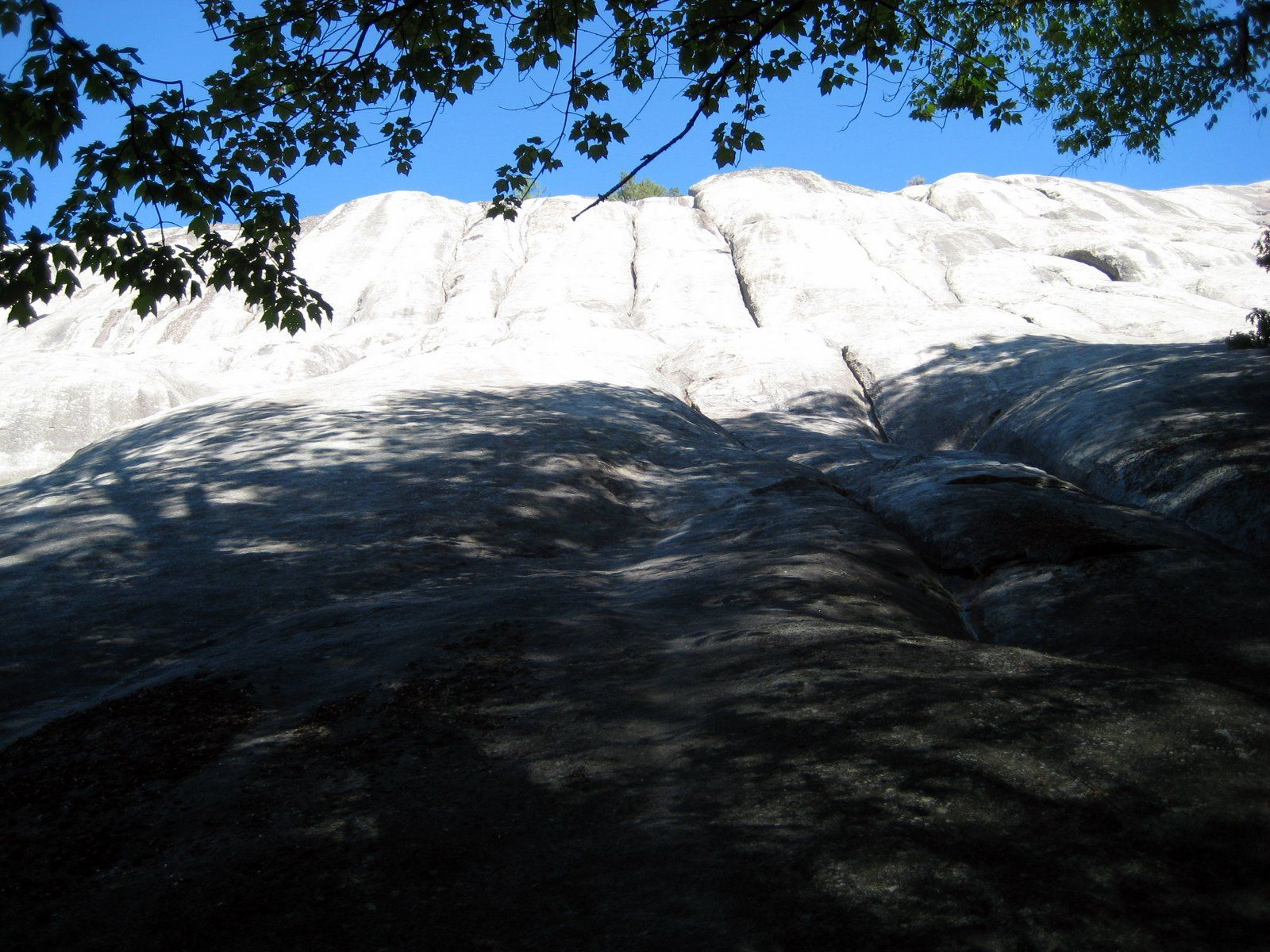
Cedar Rock from the trail

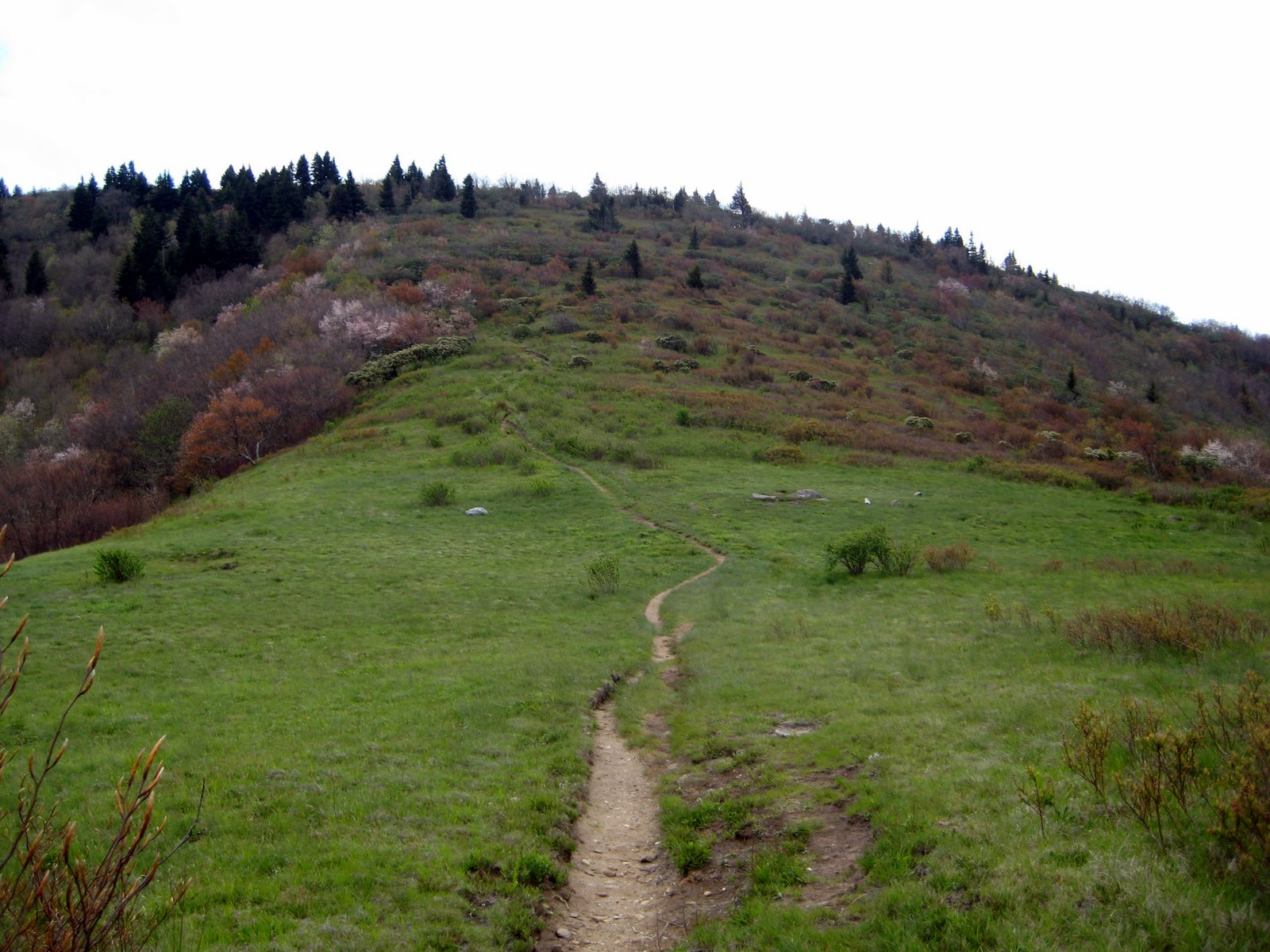
Flower Gap

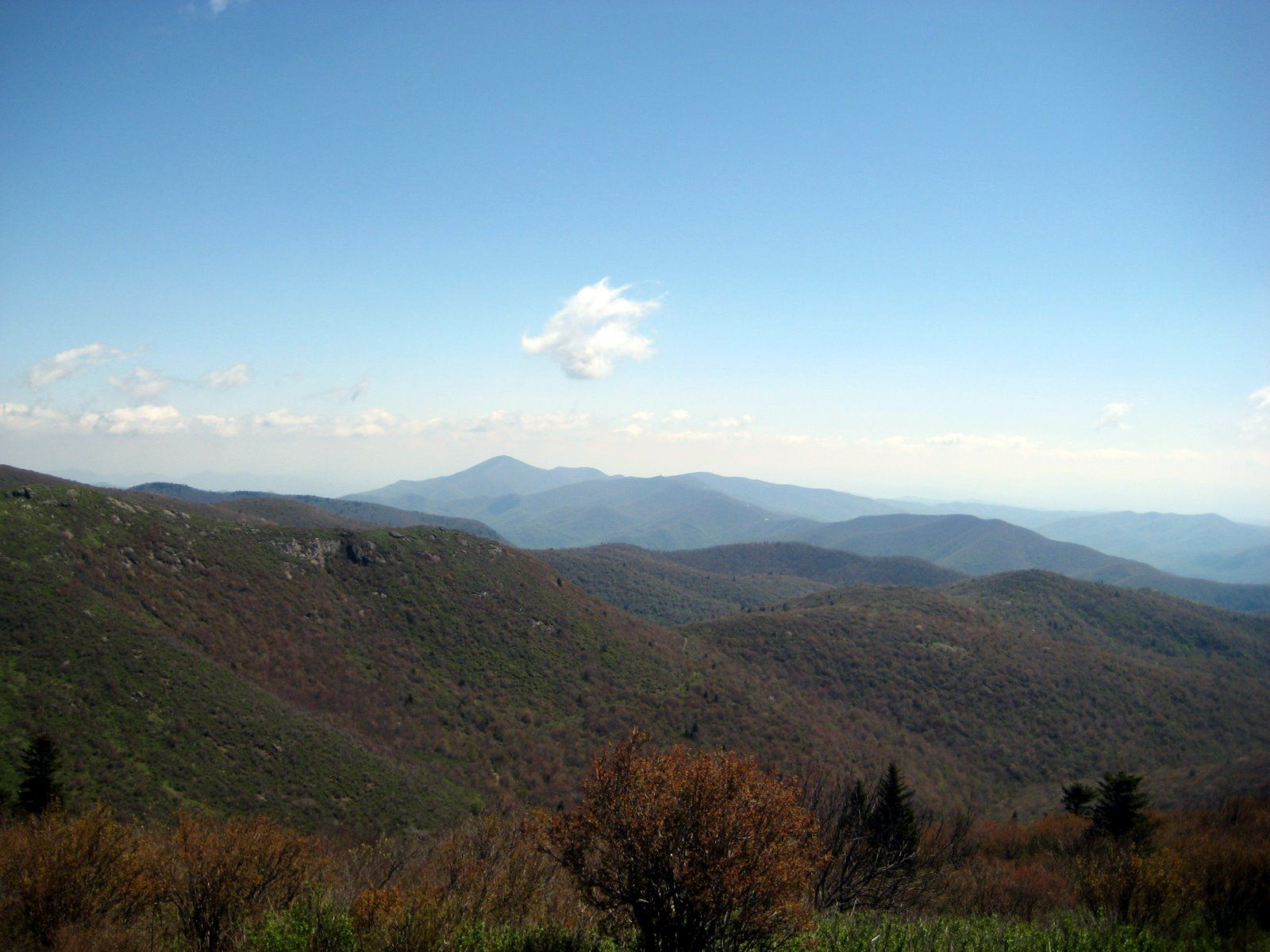
View from Tennent Mountain
