= Looking Glass Rock =

Mountain in Transylvania County, North Carolina, United States

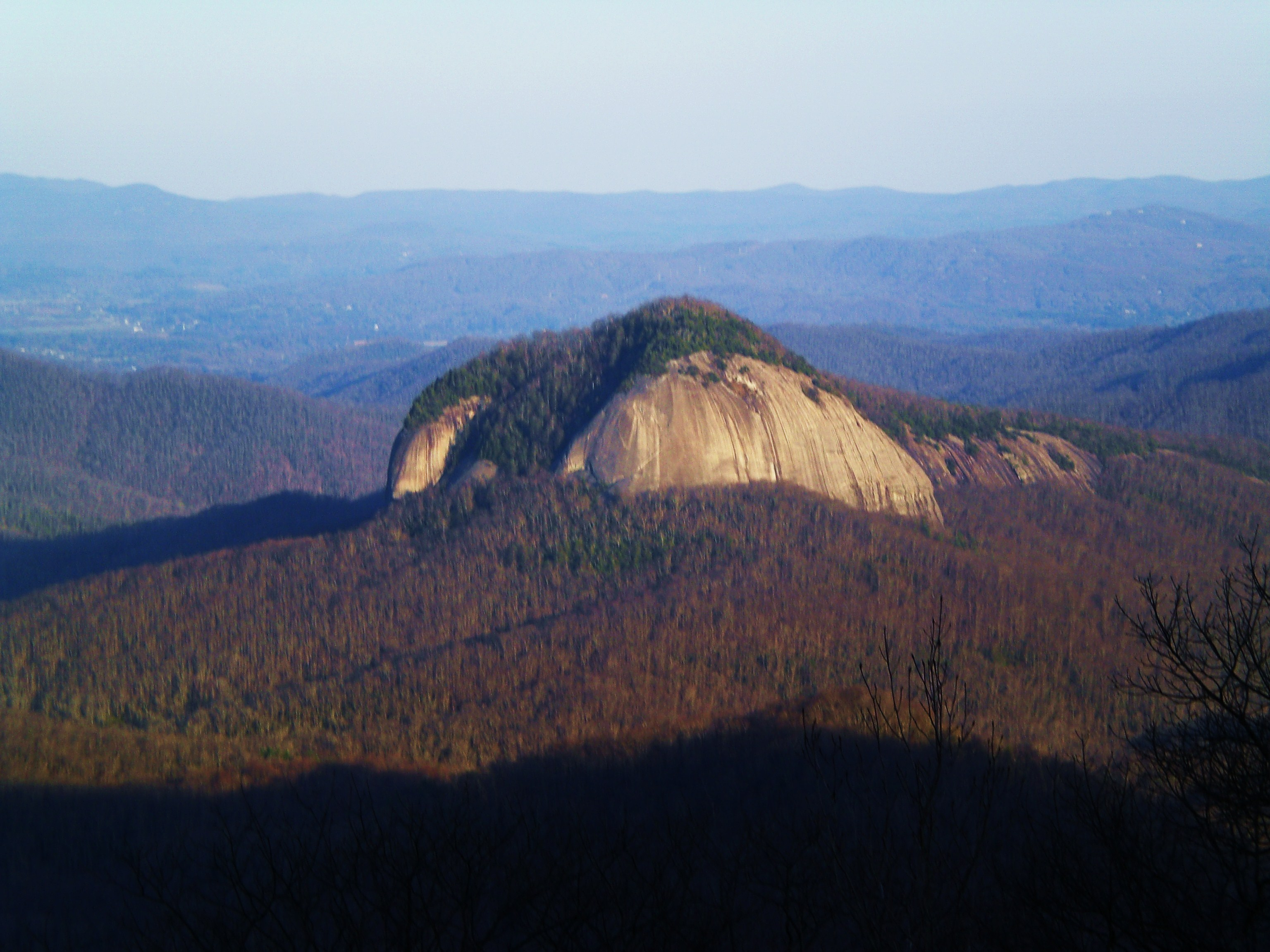

Highest point
- Elevation: 3,969 ft (1,210 m) NAVD 88
- Coordinates: 35°18′13″N 82°47′36″W

Geography
- Location within North Carolina
- Location: Transylvania County, North Carolina, U.S.
- Parent range: Appalachian Mountains
- Topo map: USGS Shining Rock

Looking Glass Rock is a pluton monolith in the Appalachian Mountains of western North Carolina, United States.

== Description ==
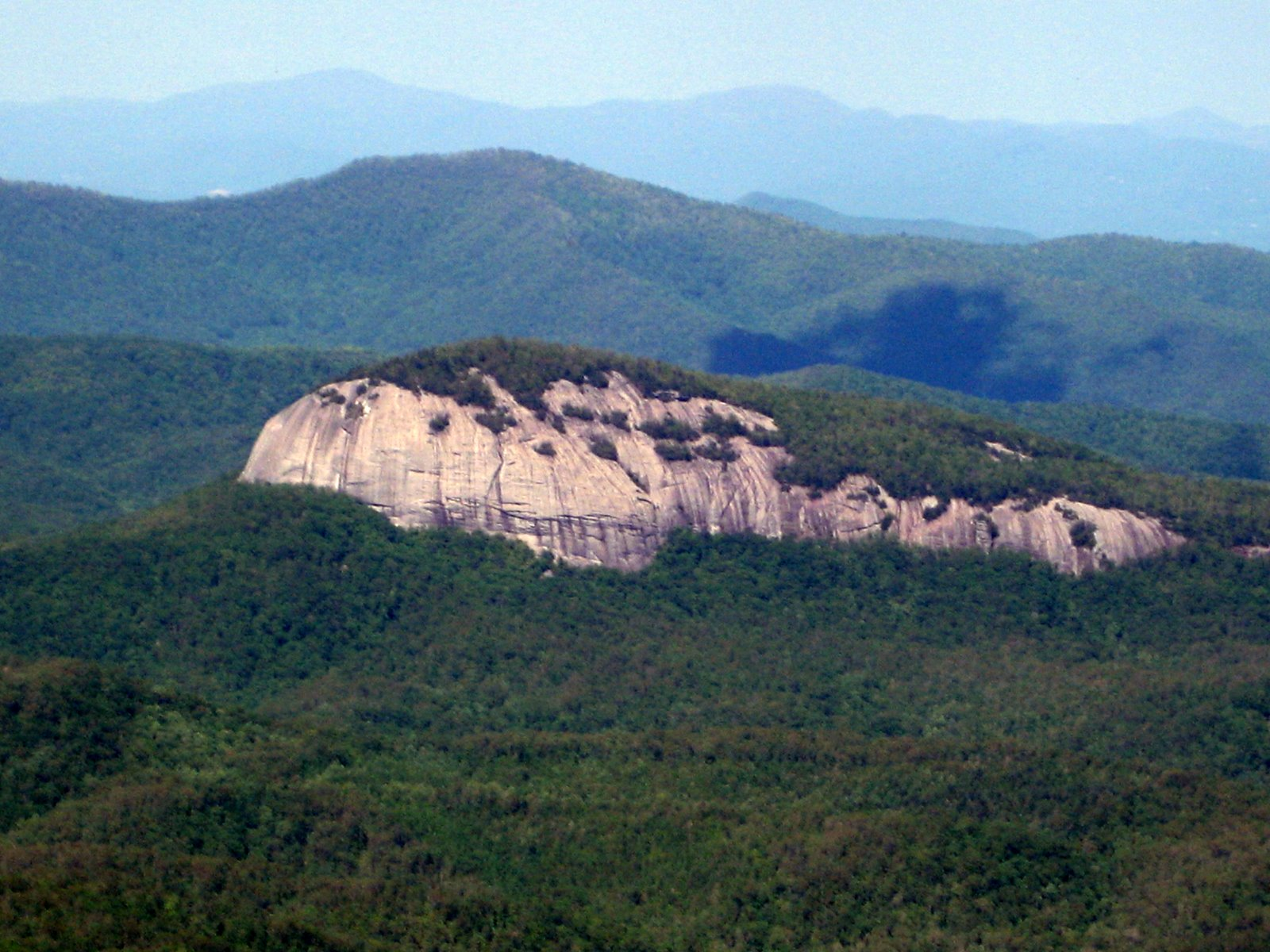
Looking Glass Rock from the Art Loeb Trail

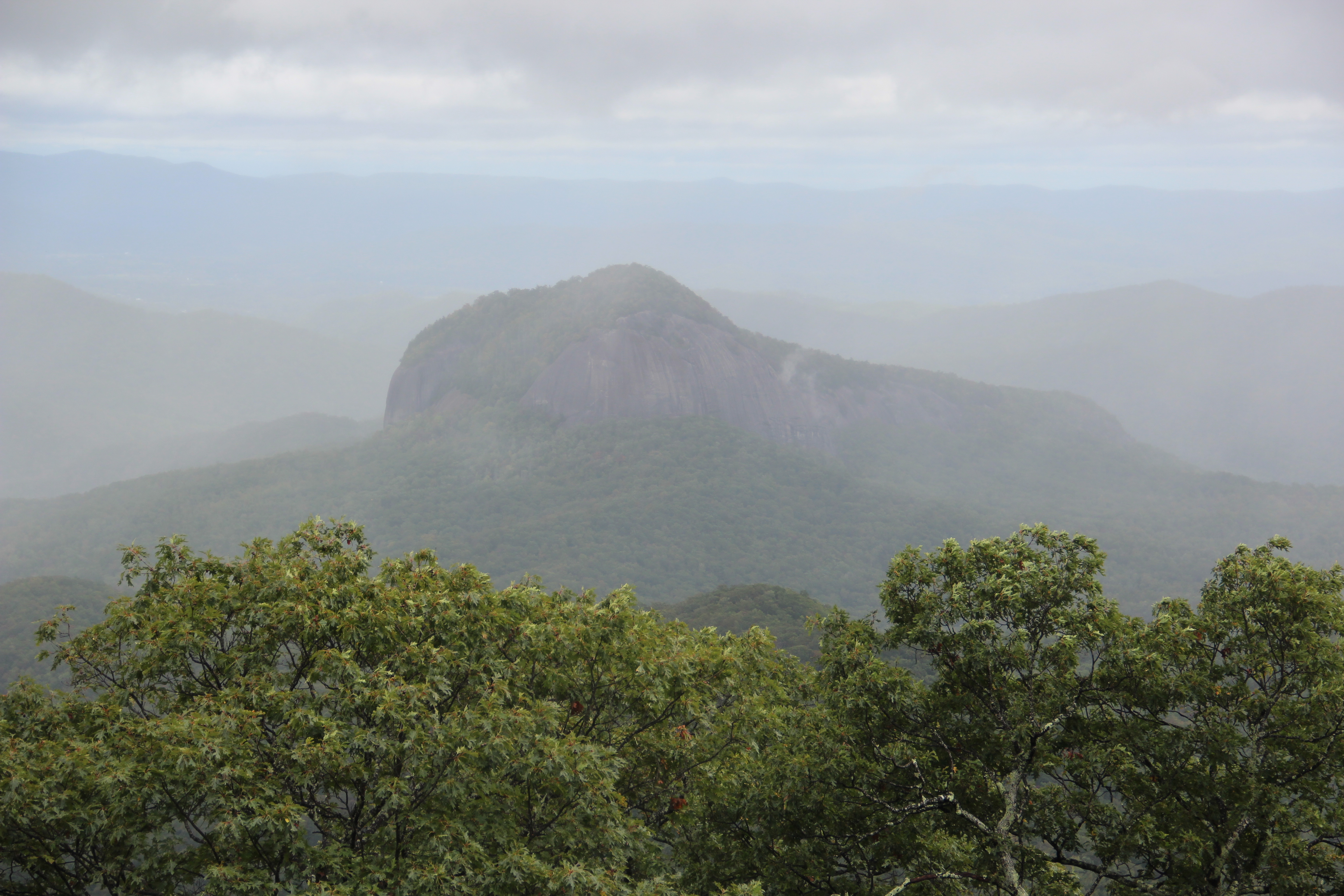
Looking Glass Rock in the rain

The mountain is located within Pisgah National Forest about 5.5 miles (8.9 km) northwest of Brevard and 25 miles (40 km) southwest of Asheville. Named for the way its granite face reflects the sunshine, it rises from the valley floor to an elevation of almost 4,000 feet (1,200 m).

Trails from Forest Service Road 475 and 475B lead to the top of the mountain. It is a moderate/strenuous trail climbing 1700 ft over 3.1 miles to its peak where panoramic views can be seen. There is a flat slab on the top, that can be used as a helipad.

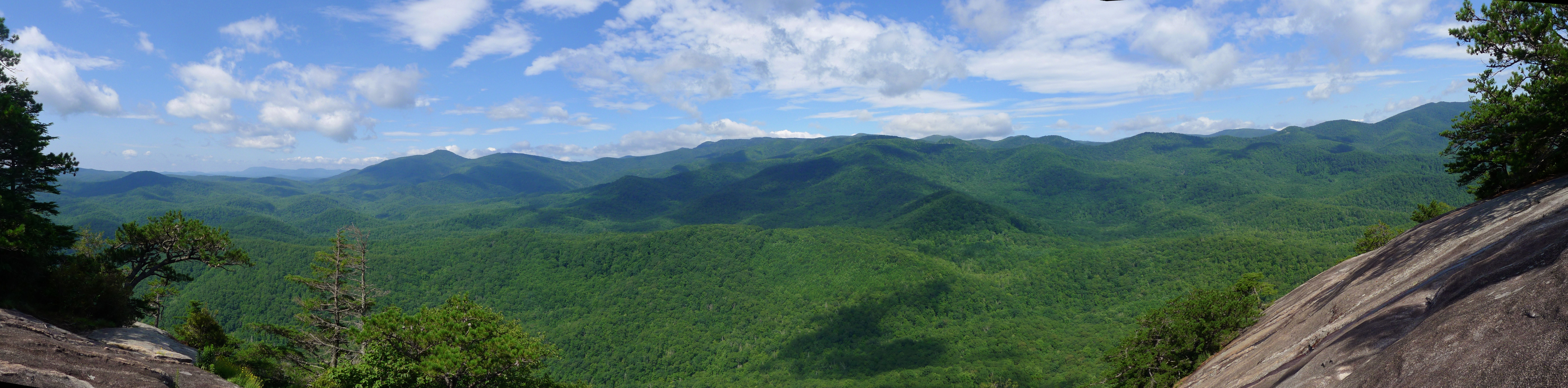
Panorama taken from Looking Glass Rock, 2013

Looking Glass Rock is a popular rock climbing destination. Whether it is free climbing, multi-pitch or aid climbing, dozens of routes traverse the South Face, North Face, Nose Area, Sun Wall, Invisible Wall and Hidden Wall to the top of the mountain.

From the top of Looking Glass Rock, panoramic views can be seen of the Blue Ridge Parkway and surrounding mountains of Transylvania County.

== See also ==
- List of mountains in North Carolina
