= Shining Rock Wilderness =

Protected wilderness in the U.S. state of North Carolina

Coordinates: 35°21′18″N 82°50′38″W

- IUCN category Ib (wilderness area)
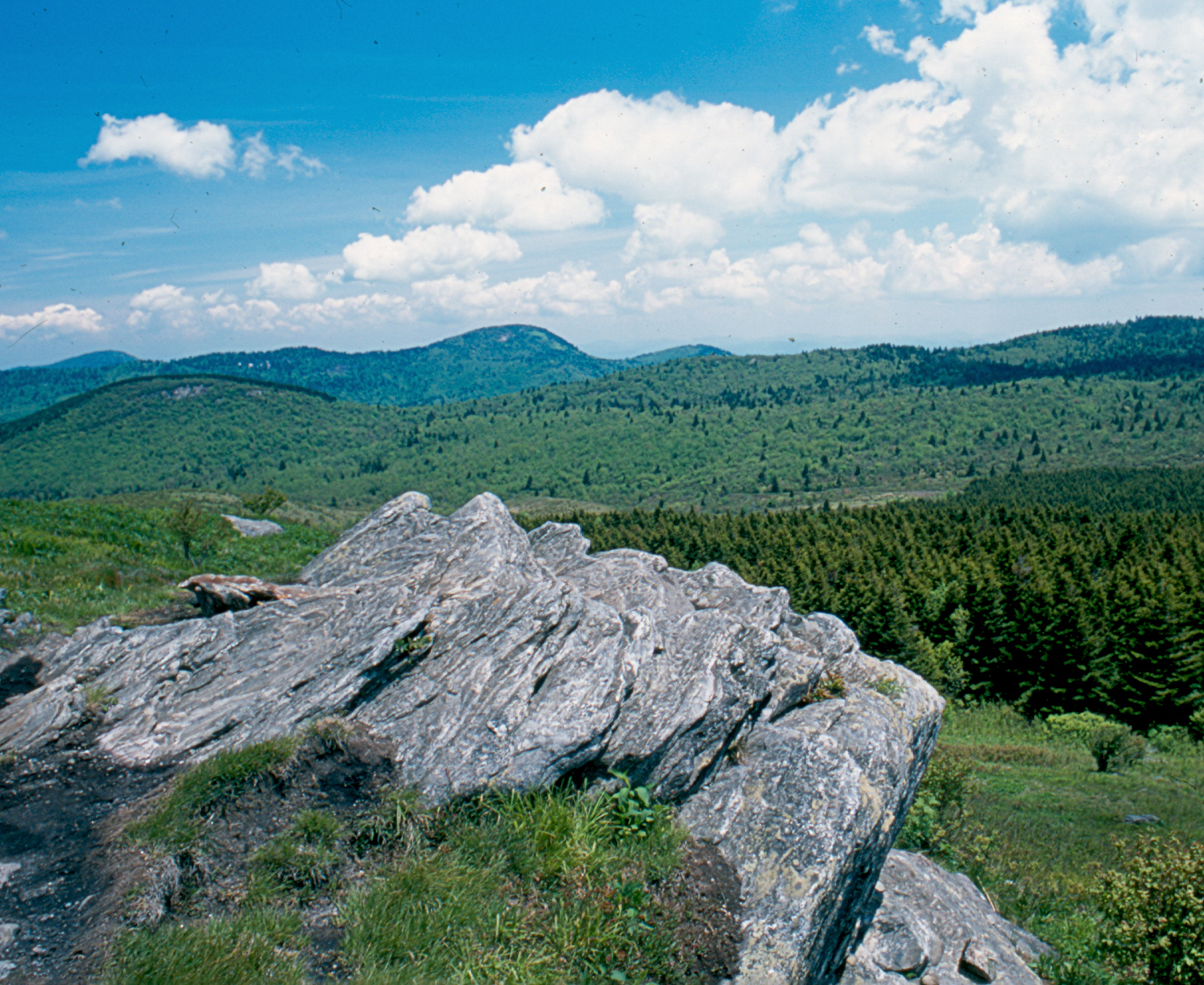
- Shining Rock Wilderness Area
- Location: Haywood County, North Carolina, United States
- Nearest city: Brevard, North Carolina
- Area: 13,400 acres (54 km^{2})
- Designation: 1964
- Designated: Wilderness Area
- Governing body: United States Forest Service
- Website: Shining Rock Wilderness

Named for Shining Rock, the Shining Rock Wilderness is a protected Wilderness Area in Haywood County, North Carolina. Its first 13,400 acres (54 km^{2}) have been part of the National Wilderness Preservation System since the System was created in 1964. It now includes 18,483 acres (74.80 km^{2}), and is managed by the United States Forest Service as part of the Pisgah National Forest. It is separated from Middle Prong Wilderness to the southwest, by NC 215.

Within the wilderness, the Art Loeb Trail can be followed to the base of Cold Mountain, where a spur trail leads to the summit. Cold Mountain is the namesake of a historical fiction novel by Charles Frazier, and its film adaptation; both are set in the time of the American Civil War.

Due to conflicts with black bears, in 2015 the Forest Service implemented a requirement for all overnight campers to carry bear-resistant canisters. Canisters are required year-round in the Wilderness Area and south of it to the Blue Ridge Parkway.
