= Shining Rock =

Mountain in North Carolina

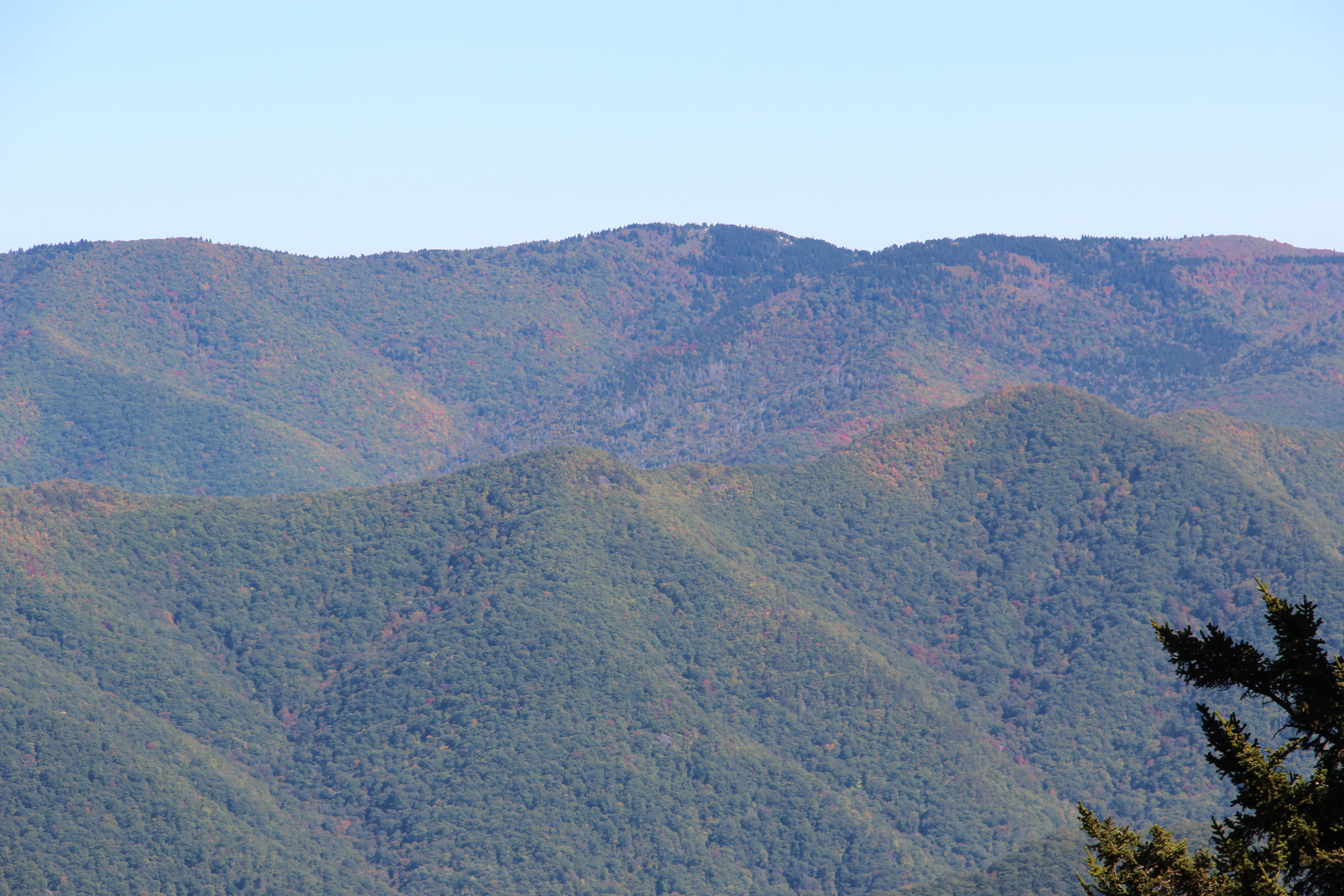
- Shining Rock viewed from the Blue Ridge Parkway

Highest point
- Elevation: 6,040 ft (1,840 m)
- Prominence: 320 ft (98 m)
- Coordinates: 35°22′05″N 82°51′44″W

Geography
- Location: Haywood County, North Carolina, U.S.
- Parent range: Great Balsam Mountains
- Topo map: USGS Shining Rock

Climbing
- Easiest route: Hike

Shining Rock is a mountain in western North Carolina, United States. The mountain is one of the Great Balsam Mountains which are a part of the Blue Ridge Mountains within the Appalachian Mountains. It is the 38th tallest mountain in the eastern United States.

Shining Rock is in the Shining Rock Wilderness near milepost 420 of the Blue Ridge Parkway. The Art Loeb Trail passes just below the summit.

Shining Rock is named for the large white quartzite rock outcropping near its summit.

== Cherokee lore ==
According to the Cherokee anthropologist James Mooney, the Cherokee name for Shining Rock, Datsu'nălâsgûñ'yĭ, translates to "where their tracks are this way" and refers to a rock that is said to have tracks of Tsul 'Kalu and his children.

This is distinct from Judaculla Rock which is discussed with Tsul 'Kalu, is south of the Blue Ridge Parkway and contains petroglyphs. Confusion arises because Judaculla (or Jutaculla) is a European corruption of the name Tsul 'Kalu; hence there appear to be two rocks of Cherokee lore named with variations of the name.

== See also ==
- List of mountains in North Carolina
