= Cold Mountain (novel) =

1997 novel by Charles Frazier

- Recent edition cover
- Author: Charles Frazier
- Language: English
- Genre: Historical novel
- Publisher: Atlantic Monthly Press
- Publication date: 1997
- Publication place: United States
- Media type: Print (hardcover)
- Pages: 356 (first edition)
- ISBN: 0-87113-679-1 (first edition, hard)
- OCLC: 36352242
- Dewey Decimal: 813/.54 21
- LC Class: PS3556.R3599 C6 1997

Cold Mountain is a 1997 historical novel by Charles Frazier which won the U.S. National Book Award for Fiction. It tells the story of W. P. Inman, a wounded deserter from the Confederate army near the end of the American Civil War who walks for months to return to Ada Monroe, the love of his life; the story shares several similarities with Homer's Odyssey, with the protagonist's circuitous and often derailed journey homeward as the central example. Nearly every chapter alternates between the stories of Inman and Ada, a minister's daughter recently relocated from Charleston to a farm in a rural mountain community near Cold Mountain, North Carolina, from which Inman hails. Though they knew each other only for a brief time before Inman departed for the war, it is largely the hope of seeing Ada again that drives Inman to desert the army and make the dangerous journey back to Cold Mountain. Details of their brief history together are told at intervals in flashback over the course of the novel.

The novel, Frazier's first, became a major best-seller, selling roughly three million copies worldwide. It was adapted into an Academy Award-winning film of the same name in 2003.

Frazier has said that the real W. P. Inman was his great-granduncle who lived near the real Cold Mountain, which is now within the Pisgah National Forest, Haywood County, North Carolina. In the book's acknowledgments, Frazier apologizes for taking "great liberties" in writing of W. P. Inman's life. Frazier also used Hendricks County, Indiana, native John V. Hadley's book Seven Months a Prisoner as inspiration for the novel.

== Plot ==
The novel opens in a Confederate military hospital in Raleigh, North Carolina, where Inman is recovering from battle wounds during the American Civil War. The soldier is tired of fighting for a cause he never believed in. After the death of a fellow soldier who'd occupied the bed next to his own, Inman decides to slip out of the hospital and return home to Cold Mountain, North Carolina.

At Cold Mountain, Ada's father has been deceased for some time, leaving his farm, Black Cove, to Ada. However, she is genteel and city-bred, and she proves an inept farmer; the property soon falls into a state of disrepair. Just as she is contemplating starvation, the farm is visited by a resourceful but homeless young woman named Ruby, who moves in with her. Together, they clean the place up and return it to productivity. Ruby also teaches Ada vital survival skills, while Ada shares her knowledge of literature with Ruby.

Inman soon becomes aware that the Confederate Home Guard is ramping up efforts to catch deserters. The deserter faces an attempted armed robbery at a rural town, even though he carries a stolen LeMat revolver for protection. He eventually meets a preacher called Veasey, whom he catches in the act of attempting to murder a woman he has impregnated. After Inman dissuades him, they travel together. They butcher a dead bull that has fallen into a creek, and the bull's owner, Junior, gives them away to the Home Guard. After long days of marching, their captors decide that the prisoners are unfit to be returned to service and so should be executed. Veasey is shot dead, but Inman is only grazed by the bullet that passed through him. The Guardsmen dig a shoddy mass grave and Inman pulls himself out, helped in part by some passing wild pigs. He cannot bury Veasey, so he turns him face down and continues on.

Occasionally in his journey, Inman is helped and sheltered by civilians who want nothing to do with the war. One of these characters is a woman who owns goats and gives him advice and medicines to finally heal his wounds. Later, he meets a woman named Sara, whom he helps by tracking and recovering her hog; it is her only source of food for the winter but had just been seized by Union soldiers.

Ruby's father, Stobrod, is caught stealing corn at Ada's farm. Ruby reveals he was a deadbeat who neglected and abandoned her when she was very young; he is also a Confederate deserter. Nevertheless, Ruby grudgingly feeds him. He then returns with a friend named Pangle, a gentle-natured young man who appears to have an unspecified intellectual disability but displays great musical aptitude. Together, they try to earn a living by playing fiddle and banjo. However, one day as Stobrod and Pangle walk through the mountain woods, Guardsmen led by the sadistic Captain Teague shoot them, killing Pangle and dealing Stobrod a near-fatal wound. A third companion, referred to as "Georgia," escapes the killing and goes off to alert Ada and Ruby. The two women arrive at the site of the shooting to find Stobrod barely alive. Ada and Ruby take him to an abandoned nearby Indigenous camp to give him a place to recover.

After Inman arrives at Black Cove to find it empty, he sets out to find Ada on the mountain. Unexpectedly he soon encounters her out hunting wild turkeys. Both characters have changed so greatly in their appearance and demeanor since they parted that it is some moments before they recognize one another. Inman takes up camp with Ada and Ruby. Ruby is initially cold towards Inman, and later says to Ada in private, "You don't need him," but Ada replies "I think I want him"; Ruby softens when she hears this. Ada later tells Inman that if she and he are married, she still wants Ruby to stay with them on the farm. Ada and Inman make love. They happily begin to imagine the life they will have together at Black Cove and make plans for their future.

However, as the party begins the trek back to the farm, the women and men split up, and Inman and Stobrod run into Captain Teague. A shootout commences in which Inman kills all the members of the Home Guard except for a young man whom Inman views as "but a boy." Inman eventually corners the boy but is reluctant to shoot him down in cold blood. However, the boy takes Inman by surprise, shooting and killing him instead.

In the epilogue, it is revealed that Ada's night with Inman resulted in the conception of a daughter. Ada raises her at Black Cove, where they live with Ruby (who got married with "Georgia" and has three sons) and Stobrod.

== Awards and nominations ==
Cold Mountain won the National Book Award, the W.D. Weatherford Award (1997), and the Boeke Prize (1998).

== Adaptations ==
- The book was adapted for the screen by director Anthony Minghella, as the 2003 film Cold Mountain, starring Jude Law, Nicole Kidman, and Renée Zellweger. The film was nominated for seven Academy Awards, including Best Actor for Jude Law, and won the Oscar for Best Supporting Actress for Renée Zellweger.
- The novel has been adapted as an opera, Cold Mountain, which was presented during the 2015 summer festival season by The Santa Fe Opera, in co-commissions and co-productions with Opera Philadelphia and the Minnesota Opera, in collaboration with North Carolina Opera, and recorded for PENTATONE (PTC 5186583). The work was composed by the 2010 Pulitzer Prize winner in music, Jennifer Higdon, from a libretto written by Gene Scheer. It was Higdon's first opera.

== Reception ==
Cold Mountain has received a mixed critical reception. "Kirkus Reviews" in The Atlantic praises Frazier's use of language, writing: "Frazier has Cormac McCarthy's gift for rendering the pitch and tang of regional speech, and for catching some of the true oddity of human nature." Kirkus goes on to say that Cold Mountain is "a promising but overlong, uneven debut." Again the critic praises and rebukes the novel, stating: "the tragic climax is convincing but somewhat rushed, given the many dilatory scenes that have preceded it." The length of the novel and the slow pace of the storytelling are again brought into question when the critic claims "there's no doubt that Frazier can write; the problem is that he stops so often to savor the sheer pleasure of the act of writing in this debut effort." The online periodical Publishers Weekly produced a more positive review of the book's writing: "Frazier vividly depicts the rough and varied terrain of Inman's travels and the colorful characters he meets." Publishers Weekly goes on to say that "Frazier shows how lives of soldiers and of civilians alike deepen and are transformed as a direct consequence of the war's tragedy." James Polk's review in The New York Times praised the novel, stating: "For a first novelist, in fact for any novelist, Charles Frazier has taken on a daunting task -- and has done extraordinarily well by it. In prose filled with grace notes and trenchant asides, he has reset much of the Odyssey in 19th-century America, near the end of the Civil War."
