= Farlow =

Farlow may refer to:

- Farlow, Shropshire, England
- Farlow (surname)
- Farlow Herbarium of Cryptogamic Botany, a herbarium and library at Harvard University

== See also ==
- Farlow and Kendrick Parks Historic District, Newton, Massachusetts
- Farlow Gap, a biking and hiking trail in North Carolina
- Farlow Hill Historic District, Newton, Massachusetts
