= Bent Creek =

Bent Creek may refer to:

- Bent Creek, Virginia, an unincorporated community in Appomattox County
- Bent Creek Campus of the Appalachian Forest Experiment Station, near Asheville, North Carolina
- Bent Creek, Buncombe County, North Carolina
- Bent Creek, Yancey County, North Carolina
