= Bent Creek, North Carolina =

Bent Creek, North Carolina may refer to:

- Bent Creek, Buncombe County, North Carolina
- Bent Creek, Yancey County, North Carolina
- Bent Creek (North Carolina), a tributary of the French Broad River
