= Unaka =

Unaka may refer to:

- Unaka High School, a public high school located northeast of Elizabethton, Tennessee
- Unaka National Forest, formerly in North Carolina, Tennessee and Virginia
- Unaka Range, a mountain range on the border of Tennessee and North Carolina
