= William Kenrick (nurseryman) =

American nurseryman (1795–1872)

William Kenrick (December 24, 1789 – February 14, 1872) was an American nurseryman.

== Early life ==
Kenrick was born in Newton, Massachusetts, in 1789. His father was John Kenrick, a horticulturist who was regarded as being one of the most eminent nurserymen in New England.

== Career ==
In 1823, Kenrick was taken into partnership by his father, whose gardens at Nonantum Hill were planted in 1790 upon the ground where John Eliot commenced preaching the gospel to the Native Americans. Perhaps Kenrick will be best remembered on account of his introduction of the white mulberry, and the active part he took in the attempt to establish the silk industry in America.

Kenrick was one of the ten co-founders of the Massachusetts Horticultural Society in 1829. He served as a counselor until 1841. In 1833, he published The New American Orchardist.

== Personal life ==
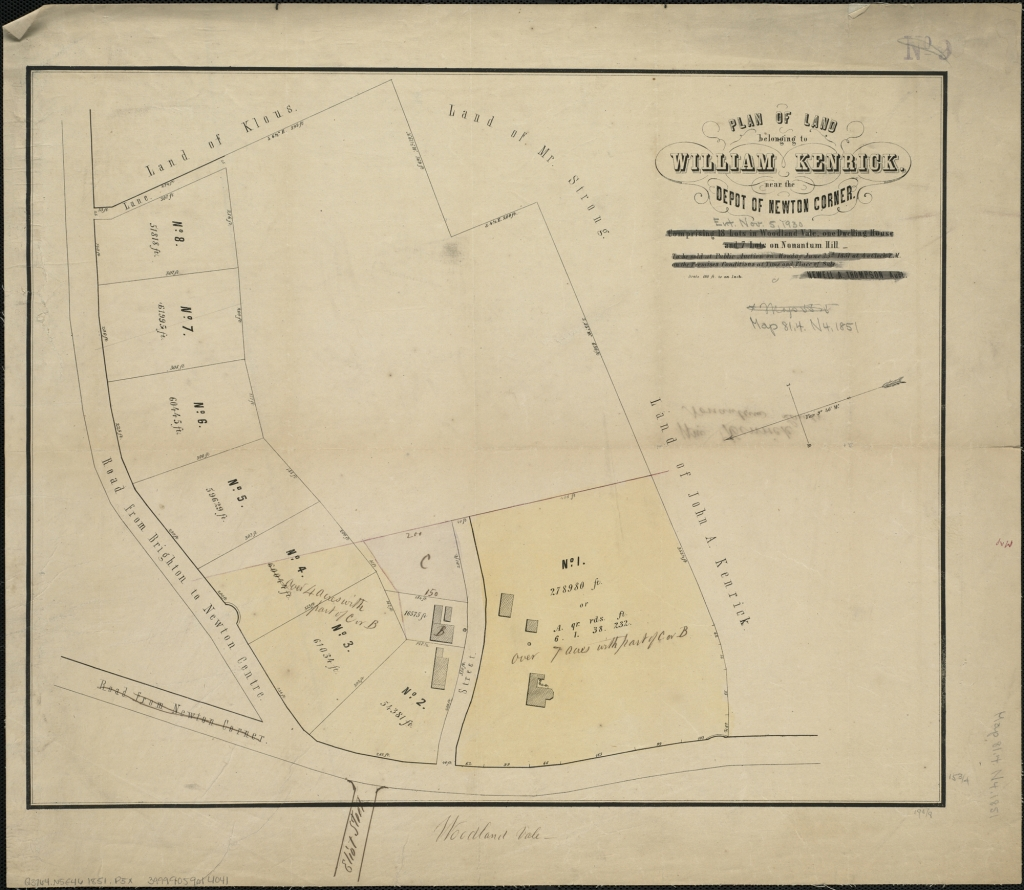
Plan of land belonging to William Kenrick, near the depot of Newton Corner

Kenrick wed Harriet Russell Jackson, a widow, in 1824.

In 1840, he developed part of his property, anchored by a c. 1822 Federal-style house which was moved to Kenrick Park in Newton.

== Death ==
Kenrick died in 1872, aged 82. His widow survived him by two years.

== Works ==
- The new American orchardist; or, An account of the most valuable varieties of fruit, adapted to cultivation in the climate of the United States, from the latitude of 25 [degrees] to 54 [degrees], with their uses, modes of culture, and management; remedies for the maladies to which they are subject, from noxious insects, and other causes, &c. Also, a brief description of the most ornamental forest trees, shrubs, flowers, &c, 1833
- The American silk growers guide, or, The art of raising the mulberry and silk and the system of successive crops in each season, 1835.
