= Smith-Peterson House =

Historic house in Massachusetts, United States

- Smith-Petersen House
- U.S. National Register of Historic Places
- U.S. Historic district – Contributing property
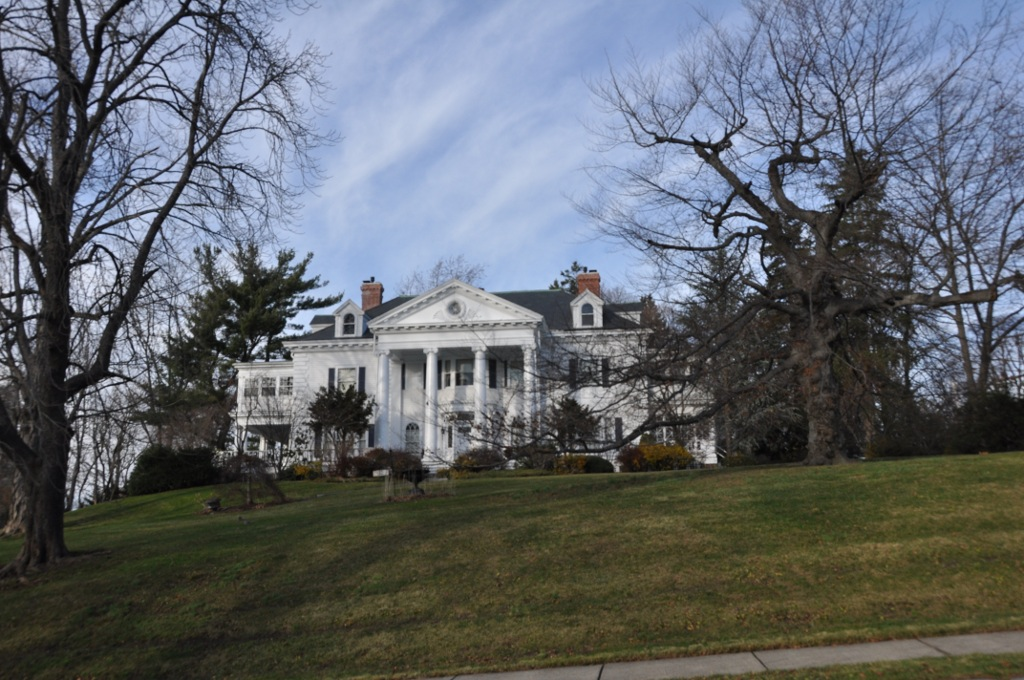

- Location within Massachusetts Location within the United States
- Location: 32 Farlow Rd., Newton, Massachusetts
- Coordinates: 42°20′49″N 71°10′44″W
- Built: 1902
- Architectural style: Colonial Revival, Georgian Revival
- Part of: Farlow Hill Historic District (ID90000110)
- MPS: Newton MRA
- NRHP reference No.: 86001882

Significant dates
- Added to NRHP: September 04, 1986
- Designated CP: February 21, 1990

The Smith-Petersen House is a historic house at 32 Farlow Road in Newton, Massachusetts. Built in 1902, the two-story house is one of the city's finest Georgian Revival structures. The 2 1/2-story rectangular building has a hip roof and flanking two-story wings. Its main facade has a massive central Greek portico with two-story columns and a fully pedimented gable with an oculus window in its tympanum.

The house was listed on the National Register of Historic Places in 1986, and included in the Farlow Hill Historic District in 1990.
