= Bent Creek (North Carolina) =

Creek in North Carolina

Coordinates: 35°30′07″N 82°35′35″W

Location
- Country: United States
- State: North Carolina
- County: Buncombe County

Basin features
- Waterbodies: Lake Powhatan

Bent Creek is a tributary of the French Broad River in Buncombe County, North Carolina. It was dammed to create Lake Powhatan, a reservoir for recreation just south of Asheville. The headwaters of Bent Creek rise near the Bent Creek Gap in southern Buncombe County. The Bent Creek watershed is about 5 miles long and 2 miles wide, and is surrounded by Appalachian hardwood forests.

== History ==
The Bent Creek area was formerly occupied by the Cherokee, before the arrival of European settlers in the late 1700s. Intensive farming and deforestation in the late 1800s caused erosion and the loss of tree stocks in the area. After being purchased by George Washington Vanderbilt III and added to the Biltmore estate, it became part of one of the earliest mountain reforestation efforts. In 1921, Bent Creek became the first Experimental Forest managed by the Appalachian Forest Experiment Station. It is currently an important area for forestry and conservation sciences. The creek is stocked with trout for fishermen.

== Lake Powhatan ==
One side of Lake Powhatan has a fishing pier, while the other side has a public beach. The North Carolina Wildlife Resources Commission stocks the lake with brook trout, brown trout and rainbow trout. The lake is a popular site for camping and other recreation. It is a part of the Bent Creek Experimental Forest, in the Pisgah National Forest.

== See also ==
- Bent Creek Campus of the Appalachian Forest Experiment Station
