= Bent Creek, Buncombe County, North Carolina =

Bent Creek, North Carolina
- Census-designated place
- Location in Buncombe County and the state of North Carolina
- Coordinates: 35°30′29″N 82°37′04″W
- Country: United States
- State: North Carolina
- County: Buncombe

Area
  - Total: 2.22 sq mi (5.74 km^{2})
  - Land: 2.21 sq mi (5.72 km^{2})
  - Water: 0.0077 sq mi (0.02 km^{2})
- Elevation: 2,156 ft (657 m)

Population (2020)
  - Total: 1,402
  - Density: 634.5/sq mi (244.97/km^{2})
- Time zone: UTC-5 (Eastern (EST))
  - Summer (DST): UTC-4 (EDT)
- FIPS code: 37-05049
- GNIS feature ID: 2402683

Bent Creek is a census-designated place (CDP) in Buncombe County, North Carolina, United States. The population was 1,287 at the 2010 census. The Bent Creek area has mountain bike trails within the Pisgah National Forest.

== History ==
For its first 70 years, Bent Creek was "a self-sufficient community". From 1866 to 1887, Glencoe was an Episcopal mission, part of Ravenscroft Theological Training School and Associate Mission, started by Colonel L.M. Hatch, with a mill, a factory, a school and a church. It was named for "a Celtic hero's homeland." Col. Hatch's family sold 1383 acres for $5 an acre in 1900 to George Washington Vanderbilt II, who was adding a game preserve and hunting area to Biltmore Estate. The land later became part of Pisgah National Forest. Russell "Pinckney" Lance had a grist mill and had a "self-sufficient farm". Other farmers used methods intended to keep the farms operating for generations. Later, the area became Bent Creek Experimental Forest.

== Geography ==
The Bent Creek CDP is located in south-central Buncombe County, southwest of downtown Asheville. It is bordered to the east by North Carolina Highway 191 (Brevard Road), to the southeast by Wesley Branch Road, to the southwest by Wolf Branch (or Wolf Creek), to the northwest by the crest of Stradley Mountain, and to the north by Boring Mill Branch. The bulk of the community centers around Bent Creek Ranch Lake on Wesley Creek. The 434-acre (176 ha) North Carolina Arboretum and Bent Creek Experimental Forest are located just outside the CDP to the south of Wesley Branch Road.

According to the United States Census Bureau, the Bent Creek CDP has a total area of 2.2 square miles (5.7 km^{2}), of which 0.008 square miles (0.02 km^{2}), or 0.35%, is water.

=== Climate ===
Climate data for Bent Creek, Buncombe County, North Carolina, 1991–2020 normals, extremes 1949–present
Month	Jan	Feb	Mar	Apr	May	Jun	Jul	Aug	Sep	Oct	Nov	Dec	Year
Record high °F (°C)	82 (28)	81 (27)	89 (32)	90 (32)	91 (33)	98 (37)	98 (37)	100 (38)	97 (36)	89 (32)	83 (28)	76 (24)	100 (38)
Mean maximum °F (°C)	65.6 (18.7)	69.2 (20.7)	77.0 (25.0)	83.4 (28.6)	86.0 (30.0)	89.1 (31.7)	90.9 (32.7)	89.9 (32.2)	87.0 (30.6)	81.5 (27.5)	73.0 (22.8)	66.8 (19.3)	91.8 (33.2)
Mean daily maximum °F (°C)	46.3 (7.9)	50.6 (10.3)	58.0 (14.4)	67.7 (19.8)	74.9 (23.8)	81.0 (27.2)	84.0 (28.9)	83.0 (28.3)	77.2 (25.1)	68.0 (20.0)	57.4 (14.1)	49.0 (9.4)	66.4 (19.1)
Daily mean °F (°C)	35.4 (1.9)	38.4 (3.6)	45.0 (7.2)	53.8 (12.1)	62.3 (16.8)	69.4 (20.8)	72.9 (22.7)	71.8 (22.1)	65.8 (18.8)	55.2 (12.9)	44.5 (6.9)	38.1 (3.4)	54.4 (12.4)
Mean daily minimum °F (°C)	24.5 (−4.2)	26.1 (−3.3)	32.0 (0.0)	39.8 (4.3)	49.8 (9.9)	57.8 (14.3)	61.7 (16.5)	60.6 (15.9)	54.4 (12.4)	42.5 (5.8)	31.5 (−0.3)	27.2 (−2.7)	42.3 (5.7)
Mean minimum °F (°C)	7.1 (−13.8)	12.7 (−10.7)	17.7 (−7.9)	27.0 (−2.8)	34.6 (1.4)	46.7 (8.2)	54.1 (12.3)	52.1 (11.2)	41.4 (5.2)	27.7 (−2.4)	19.0 (−7.2)	13.3 (−10.4)	4.8 (−15.1)
Record low °F (°C)	−16 (−27)	−5 (−21)	−1 (−18)	17 (−8)	26 (−3)	33 (1)	40 (4)	38 (3)	29 (−2)	15 (−9)	−1 (−18)	−9 (−23)	−16 (−27)
Average precipitation inches (mm)	4.50 (114)	3.57 (91)	4.64 (118)	4.46 (113)	4.12 (105)	4.75 (121)	5.19 (132)	4.13 (105)	4.74 (120)	3.64 (92)	4.07 (103)	4.20 (107)	52.01 (1,321)
Average snowfall inches (cm)	1.7 (4.3)	0.4 (1.0)	1.3 (3.3)	0.0 (0.0)	0.0 (0.0)	0.0 (0.0)	0.0 (0.0)	0.0 (0.0)	0.0 (0.0)	0.0 (0.0)	0.0 (0.0)	0.6 (1.5)	4.0 (10)
Average precipitation days (≥ 0.01 in)	10.2	9.5	11.8	10.3	9.9	13.0	12.6	12.0	8.6	6.7	8.1	9.9	122.6
Average snowy days (≥ 0.1 in)	0.5	0.6	0.3	0.1	0.0	0.0	0.0	0.0	0.0	0.0	0.0	0.3	1.8
Source 1: NOAA
Source 2: National Weather Service

== Demographics ==
Historical population
Census	Pop.	Note	%±
2020	1,402		—
U.S. Decennial Census

As of the census of 2000, there were 1,389 people, 552 households, and 418 families residing in the CDP. The population density was 627.6 inhabitants per square mile (242.3/km^{2}). There were 583 housing units at an average density of 263.4 per square mile (101.7/km^{2}). The racial makeup of the CDP was 97.41% White, 0.43% African American, 0.22% Native American, 1.01% Asian, 0.29% from other races, and 0.65% from two or more races. Hispanic or Latino of any race were 1.08% of the population.

There were 552 households, out of which 33.0% had children under the age of 18 living with them, 65.8% were married couples living together, 6.5% had a female householder with no husband present, and 24.1% were non-families. 19.7% of all households were made up of individuals, and 6.9% had someone living alone who was 65 years of age or older. The average household size was 2.52 and the average family size was 2.90.

In the CDP, the population was spread out, with 24.0% under the age of 18, 4.8% from 18 to 24, 29.9% from 25 to 44, 27.6% from 45 to 64, and 13.7% who were 65 years of age or older. The median age was 40 years. For every 100 females, there were 96.7 males. For every 100 females age 18 and over, there were 91.1 males.

The median income for a household in the CDP was $49,375, and the median income for a family was $57,768. Males had a median income of $36,136 versus $27,964 for females. The per capita income for the CDP was $22,138. About 6.7% of families and 9.0% of the population were below the poverty line, including 8.6% of those under age 18 and 18.6% of those age 65 or over.
