= Boone National Forest =

American forest

Boone National Forest was established by the U.S. Forest Service in North Carolina on January 16, 1920, with 492,340 acres (1,992.4 km^{2}). On March 25, 1921, Boone was combined with Pisgah National Forest and the name was discontinued.
