= Farlow (surname) =

Farlow or Farlowe is a surname. The surname derives from either Farlow or Fairley in Shropshire, England. Notable people with the surname include:

- Brian Farlow (born 1964), U.S. Virgin Islands swimmer
- Chris Farlowe (born 1940), English pop, soul, and R&B singer
- Jarred Farlow (born 1986), Australian rugby player
- Scott Farlow, Australian politician
- Stanley Farlow (born 1937), American mathematician
- Tal Farlow (1921–1998), American jazz guitarist
- Tessa King-Farlow (born 1941), British garden designer
- William Gilson Farlow (1844–1919), American botanist

== In fiction ==
- Clayton Farlow, from the American TV series Dallas
- Evelyn Farlow, from the Australian TV soap opera Neighbours
