= Unaka National Forest =

Former forest in United States

Coordinates: 35.35°N 82.77°W

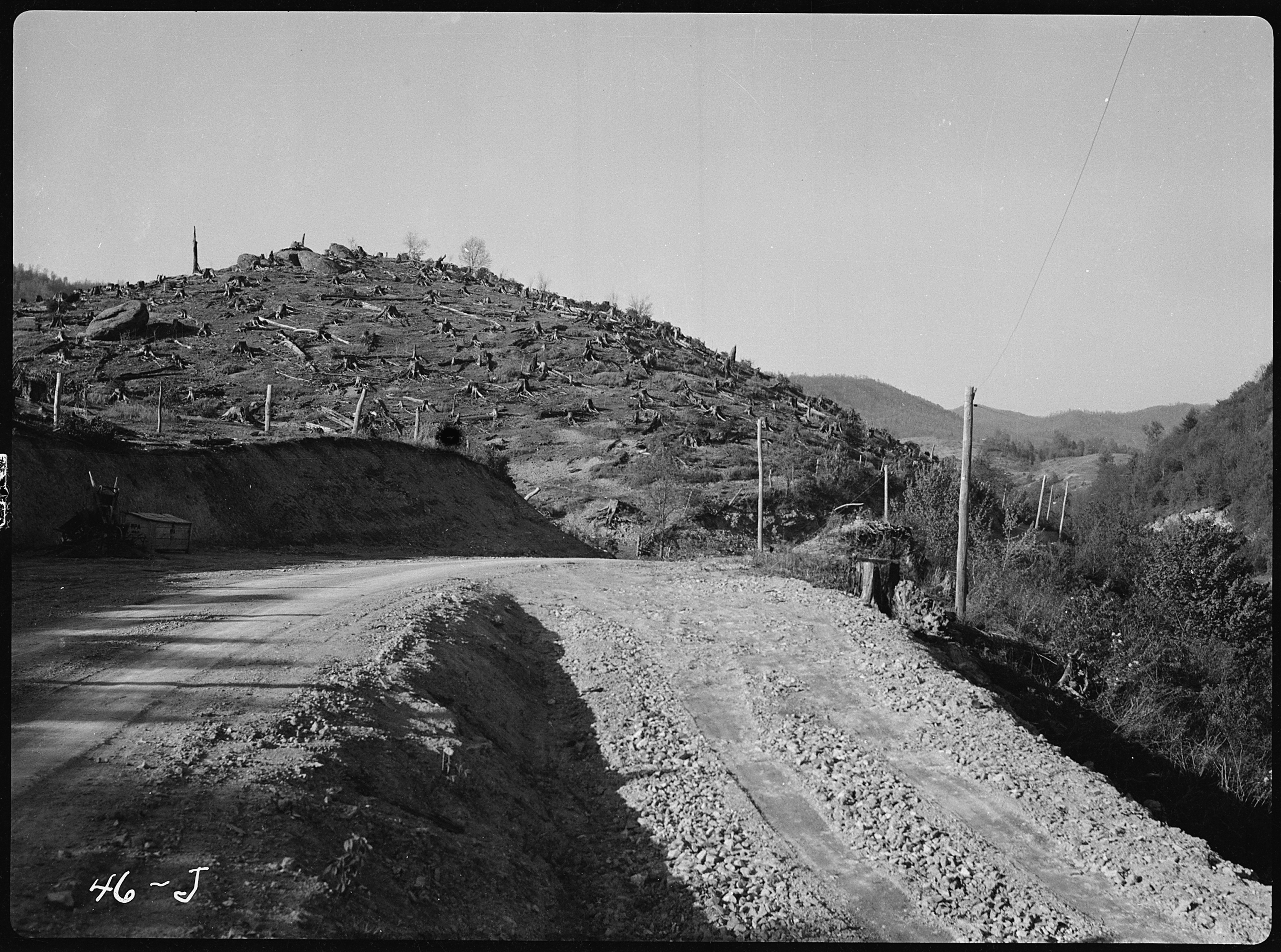
Bad Lands, Unaka National Forest, 1936

Unaka National Forest was established by the U.S. Forest Service in North Carolina, Tennessee and Virginia on July 24, 1920, with 840,996 acres (3,403.39 km^{2}). On July 10, 1936, most of the forest was transferred to Pisgah National Forest, with the Virginia portion going to Jefferson National Forest, and the name was discontinued.
