= Farlow Hill Historic District =

Historic district in Massachusetts, United States

- U.S. National Register of Historic Places
- U.S. Historic district
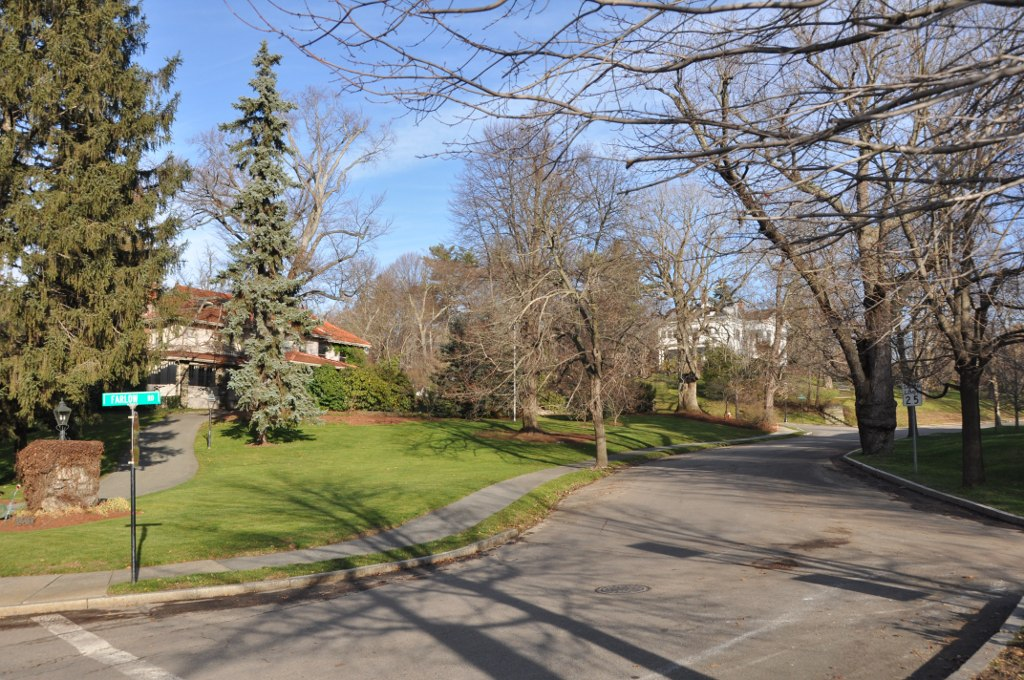

- Location within Massachusetts Location within the United States
- Location: Roughly bounded by Shornecliffe Rd., Franklin St., Chamberlain Rd., Huntington Rd., and Farlow Rd., Newton, Massachusetts
- Coordinates: 42°20′52″N 71°10′42″W
- Architect: Multiple
- Architectural style: Late 19th And 20th Century Revivals, Bungalow/Craftsman, Moderne
- MPS: Newton MRA
- NRHP reference No.: 90000110
- Added to NRHP: February 21, 1990

The Farlow Hill Historic District is a residential historic district in the Newton Corner area of Newton, Massachusetts, United States. It includes houses on Shornecliffe Road, Beechcroft Road, Farlow Road, Huntington Road, and a few properties on immediately adjacent streets. Most of the houses in the district were built between 1899 and the late 1920s and are either Craftsman or Colonial Revival in their style. The area was created by the subdivision of the estate of John Farlow, and includes 37 large and well-appointed houses, generally architect-designed, on ample lots. The district was listed on the National Register of Historic Places in 1990.

John Farlow was a local businessman whose landscaped estate occupied 40 acres (16 ha) on Farlow Hill. After his death in the 1890s it was subdivided according to a plan by the engineering firm of Aspinwall and Lincoln. The area was outfitted with all of the latest amenities: water, sewer, and gas lines, and electrical service, and was described in a 1907 newspaper article as "Newton's choicest residential section".

The preponderance of houses in the district are Colonial Revival in character. Of particular note is the 1902 Smith-Peterson House at 32 Farlow Road, which was separately listed on the National Register; it is distinguished with a monumental pedimented front. Another particularly elaborate example is 114 Farlow Road, with a row of pedimented dormers in its gabled slate roof, a modillioned cornice, and corner quoining. The house at 52 Farlow Road is a typical example of Tudor Revival styling: a stucco clad 2 1/2 story house built in 1922, the left side of its main facade is an expanse of half-timbering. Craftsman style houses include the unusual 106 Shornecliff Road, a shingled instance of the style built in 1911.

== See also ==
- National Register of Historic Places listings in Newton, Massachusetts
