= Pisgah National Forest =

National forest in North Carolina

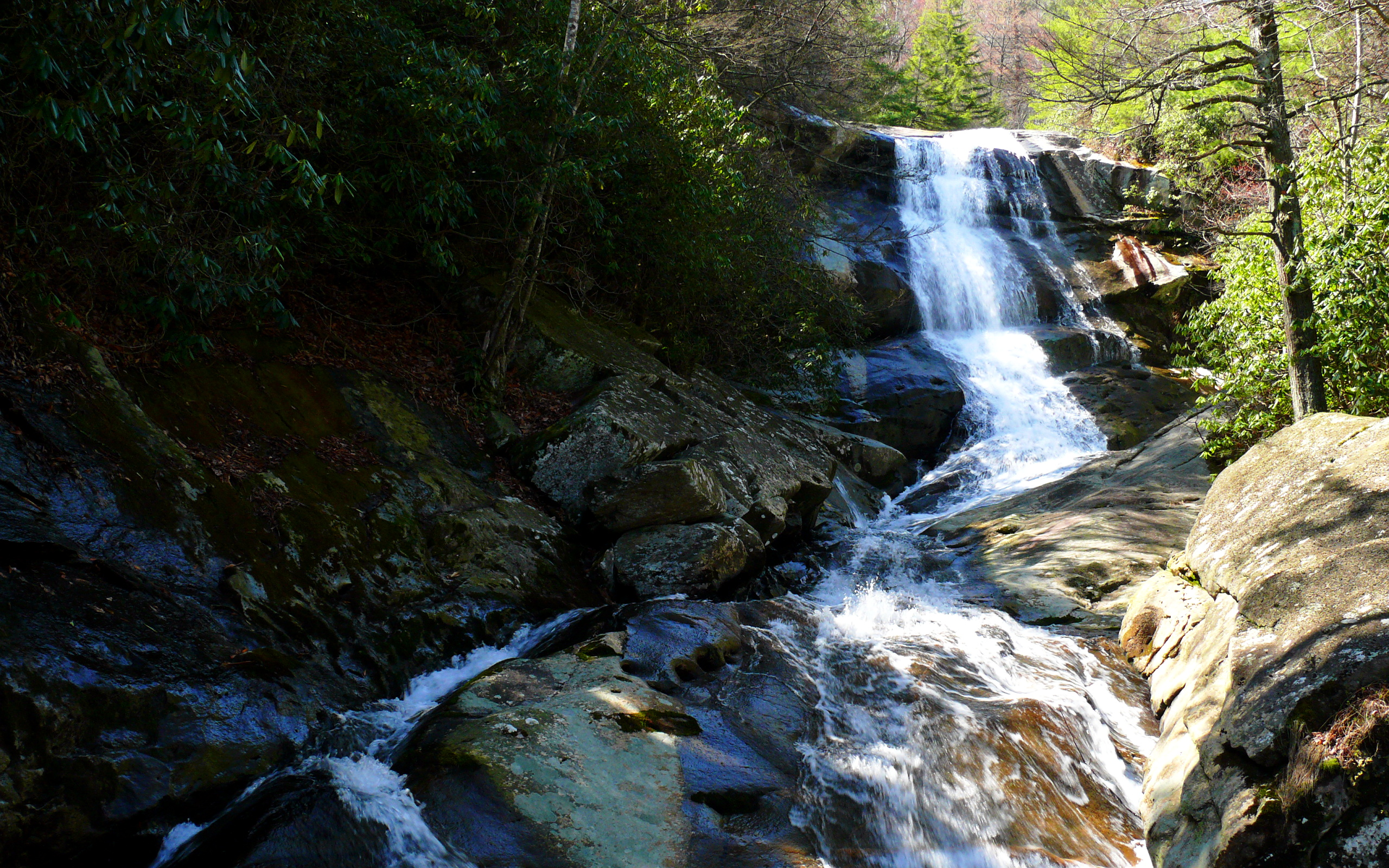
- Upper Creek Falls near the community of Linville in Pisgah National Forest

- Location within the United States
- Location: North Carolina, United States
- Nearest city: Asheville, NC
- Coordinates: 35°21′36″N 82°47′35″W
- Area: 512,758 acres (2,075.06 km^{2})
- Established: October 17, 1916
- Governing body: U.S. Forest Service
- Website: Pisgah National Forest

Looking Glass Falls in early summer

Pisgah National Forest is a National Forest in the Appalachian Mountains of western North Carolina. It is administered by the United States Forest Service, part of the United States Department of Agriculture. The Pisgah National Forest is completely contained within the state of North Carolina. The forest is managed together with the other three North Carolina National Forests (Croatan, Nantahala, and Uwharrie) from common headquarters in Asheville, North Carolina. There are local ranger district offices located in Pisgah Forest, Mars Hill, and Nebo.

== Name ==
Pisgah (פִּסְגָּה) is a Biblical Hebrew word with several meanings: it can be used to describe someone’s best achievement; another meaning is the highest point of a mountain, “summit”. Some translators of the Bible book of Deuteronomy translated the word as a name of a mountain in general, usually referring to Mount Nebo.

== History ==
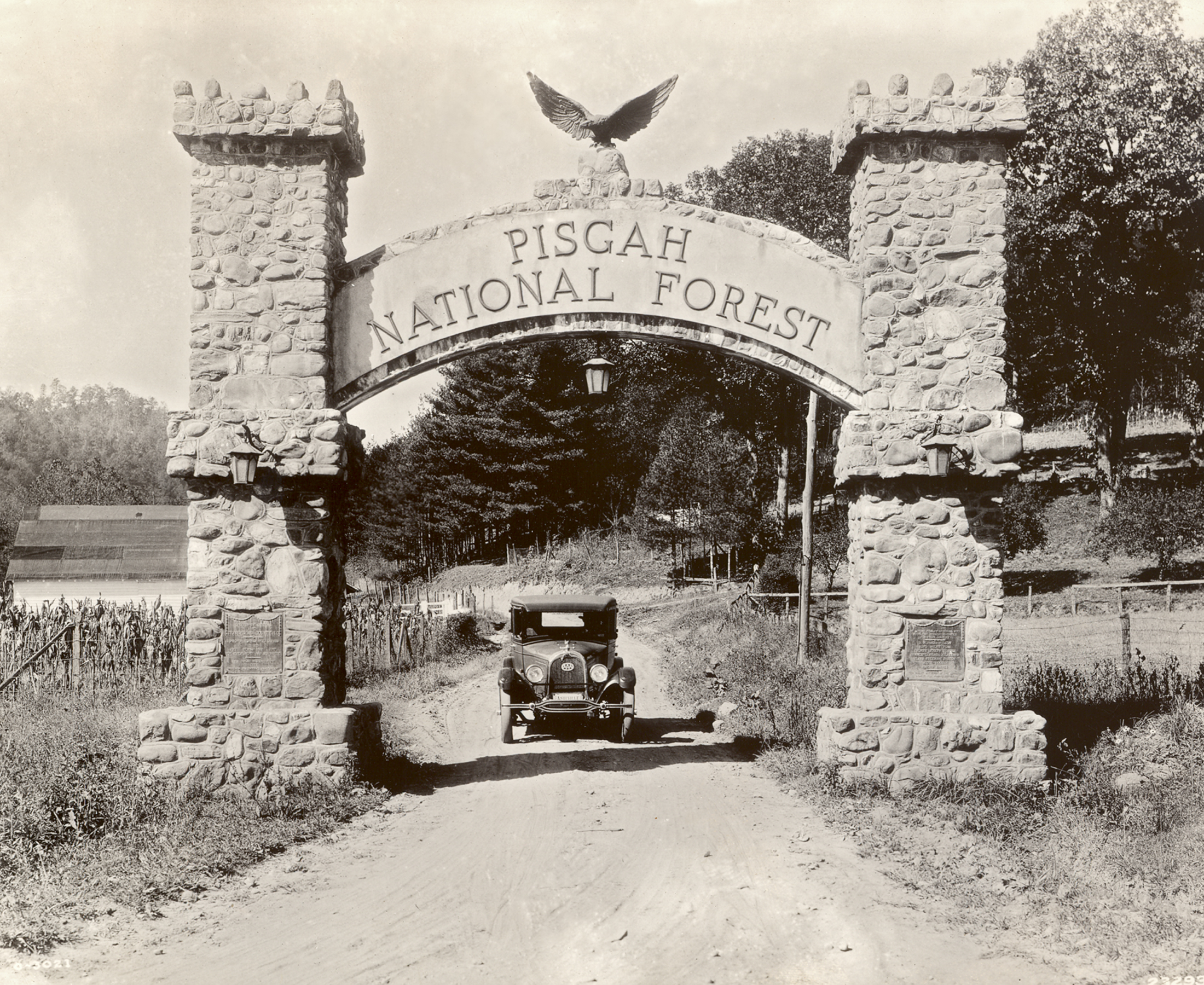
This historical image shows the entrance arch into Pisgah National Forest as it appeared from 1916 to 1936, until U.S. 276 was built.

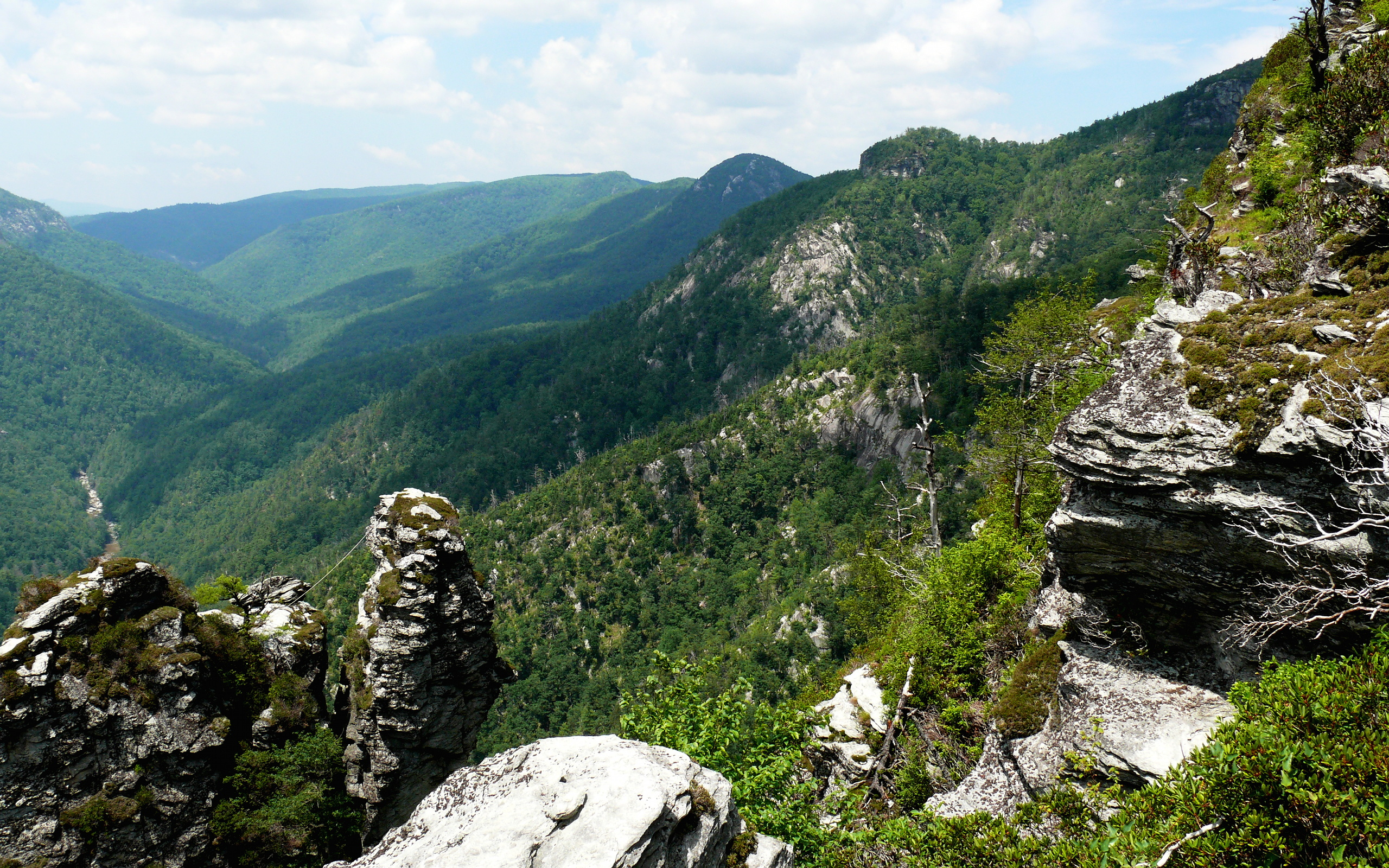
Linville Gorge Wilderness in the Pisgah National Forest.

The Pisgah National Forest was established in 1916, one of the first national forests in the eastern United States. The new preserve included approximately 86,700 acres (35,100 ha) that had been part of the Biltmore Estate, but were sold to the federal government in 1914 by Edith Vanderbilt. Some of the forest tracts were among the first purchases by the Forest Service under the Weeks Act of 1911. While national forests had already been created in the western United States, the Weeks Act provided the authority required to create national forests in the east as well. Although tracts in the future Pisgah National Forest were among the first purchased under the Weeks Act, the very first to receive formal approval was the 31,000-acre (130 km^{2}) Gennett Purchase in northern Georgia. On March 25, 1921 Boone National Forest was added to Pisgah, and on July 10, 1936, most of Unaka National Forest was added. In 1954 the Pisgah National Forest was administratively combined with the Croatan and Nantahala national forests, collectively known as the National Forests of North Carolina.

American forestry has roots in what is now the Pisgah National Forest. The Cradle of Forestry, (Biltmore Forest School), located in the southern part of the forest, was the site of the first school of forestry in the United States. It operated during the late 19th and early 20th centuries. The school was opened and operated at the direction of George Washington Vanderbilt II, builder of the Biltmore Estate in Asheville. The Forestry Education offered at Biltmore was taught by Carl Schenk. A native German, Schenk was referred to Vanderbilt when Gifford Pinchot resigned to operate the newly formed Division of Forestry. The Cradle of Forestry and the Biltmore Estate played a major role in the birth of the U.S. Forest Service. Today these lands are part of an educational and recreational area in Pisgah National Forest.

Located on the forest property is the Bent Creek Campus of the Appalachian Forest Experiment Station, listed on the National Register of Historic Places in 1993.

== Administration ==
The Pisgah National Forest is divided into 3 Ranger Districts: the Grandfather, Appalachian, and Pisgah districts. The Grandfather and Appalachian Ranger Districts lie in the northern mountains of North Carolina and include areas such as the Linville Gorge Wilderness, Wilson Creek, the watersheds of the Toe and Cane rivers, Roan Mountain, Mount Mitchell, Craggy Gardens, and the Big Ivy/Coleman Boundary area. The Grandfather Ranger District office is located in Nebo. The Appalachian Ranger District stretches along the Tennessee border from the Great Smoky Mountains National Park north to Hot Springs, with the district office located in Mars Hill. The Appalachian Trail passes through this district, as well as the Cherokee National Forest in Tennessee. The Pisgah Ranger District lies mostly south of Asheville, in parts of Henderson, Transylvania and Haywood counties, with the district office located in Pisgah Forest.

== Geography ==
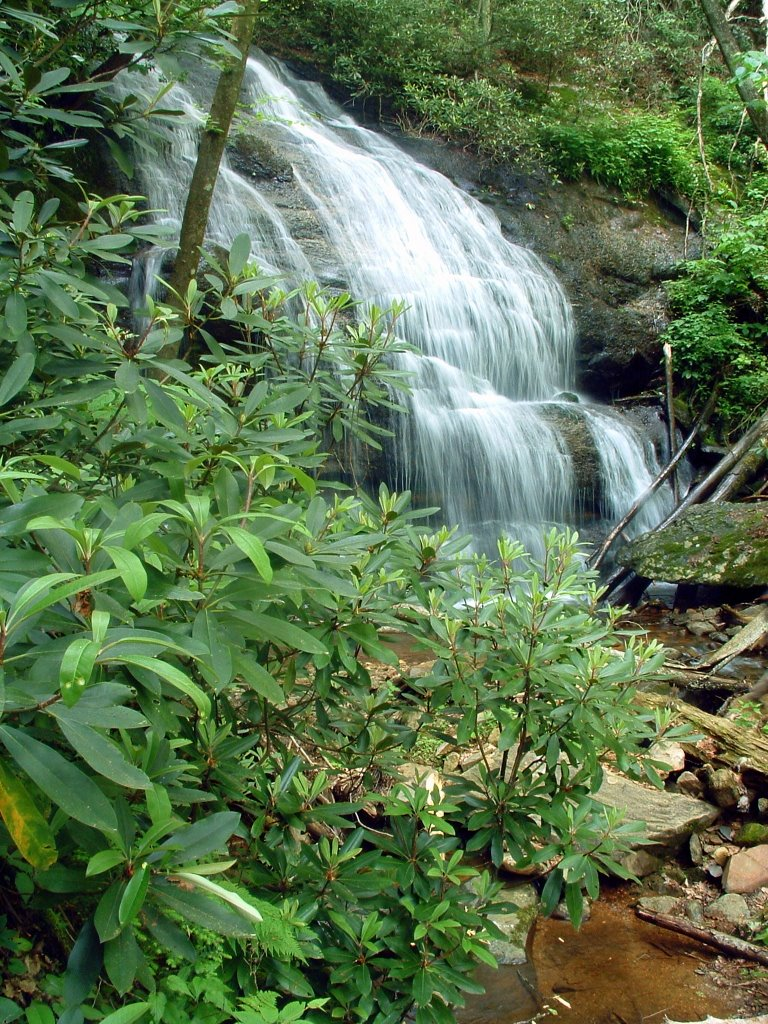
Waterfall on West Prong Hickey Fork Creek

The Pisgah National Forest covers 512,758 acres (801 mi^{2}; 2,075 km^{2}) of mountainous terrain in the southern Appalachian Mountains, including parts of the Blue Ridge Mountains and Great Balsam Mountains. It is also part of the Appalachian temperate rainforest. Elevations reach over 6,000 feet (1,800 m) and include some of the highest mountains in the eastern United States. Summit elevations include Black Balsam Knob at 6,214 feet (1,894 m), Mount Hardy at 6,110 feet (1,860 m), Tennant Mountain at 6,056 feet (1,846 m), and Cold Mountain at 6,030 feet (1,840 m). Mount Mitchell, in Mount Mitchell State Park, is the highest mountain east of the Mississippi River and lies just outside the boundary of Pisgah National Forest.

The forest also includes tracts surrounding the city of Asheville, the city of Brevard and land in the French Broad River Valley. Recreation includes activities such as hiking, backpacking, and mountain biking. The land and its resources are also used for hunting, wildlife management, and timber harvesting, as well as the North Carolina Arboretum. The forest lies in parts of 12 counties in western North Carolina. In descending order they are Transylvania, McDowell, Haywood, Madison, Caldwell, Burke, Yancey, Buncombe, Avery, Mitchell, Henderson, and Watauga counties.

== Forests and old growth ==
Some 46,600 acres (189 km^{2}) of old-growth forests have been identified in the Pisgah National Forest, with 10,000 acres (4,000 ha) in Linville Gorge.

== Rivers and trails ==
Bent Creek, Mills River, and Davidson River - three major streams and tributaries of the French Broad River - are located in the Pisgah Ranger District, which lies on either side of the Blue Ridge Parkway south of Asheville, along the Pisgah Ridge and Balsam Mountains. Three long-distance recreational trails - the Mountains-to-Sea Trail, the Shut-In Trail, and the Art Loeb Trail travel through this district. Also included in the Pisgah Ranger District are the Shining Rock and Middle Prong Wildernesses. The Blue Ridge Parkway transects this National Forest, and many National Forest and Parkway trails intersect.

== Recreation ==
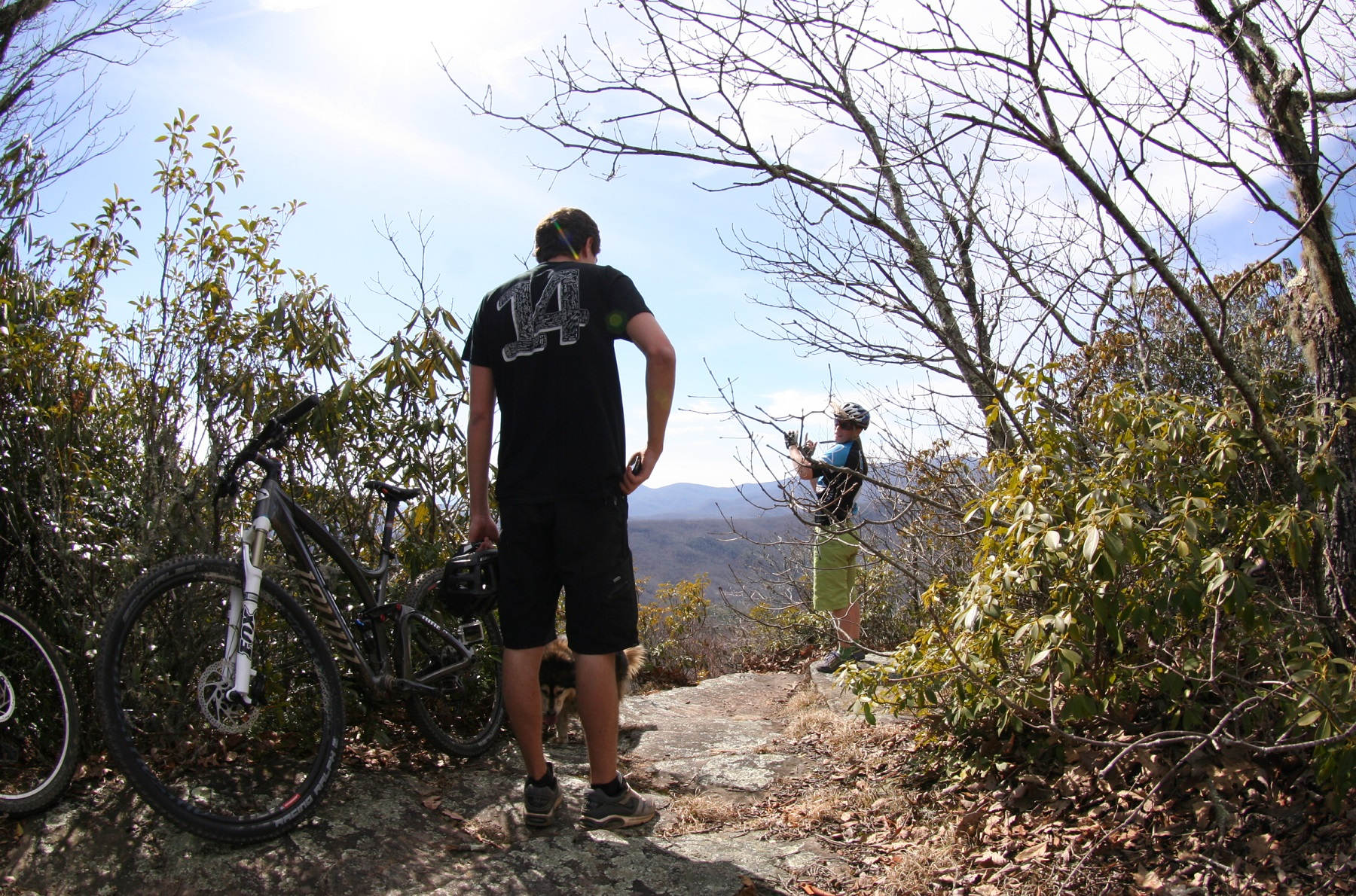
View from Black Mountain Trail in Pisgah National Forest. Mountain bikers take a break near the summit of Black Mountain.

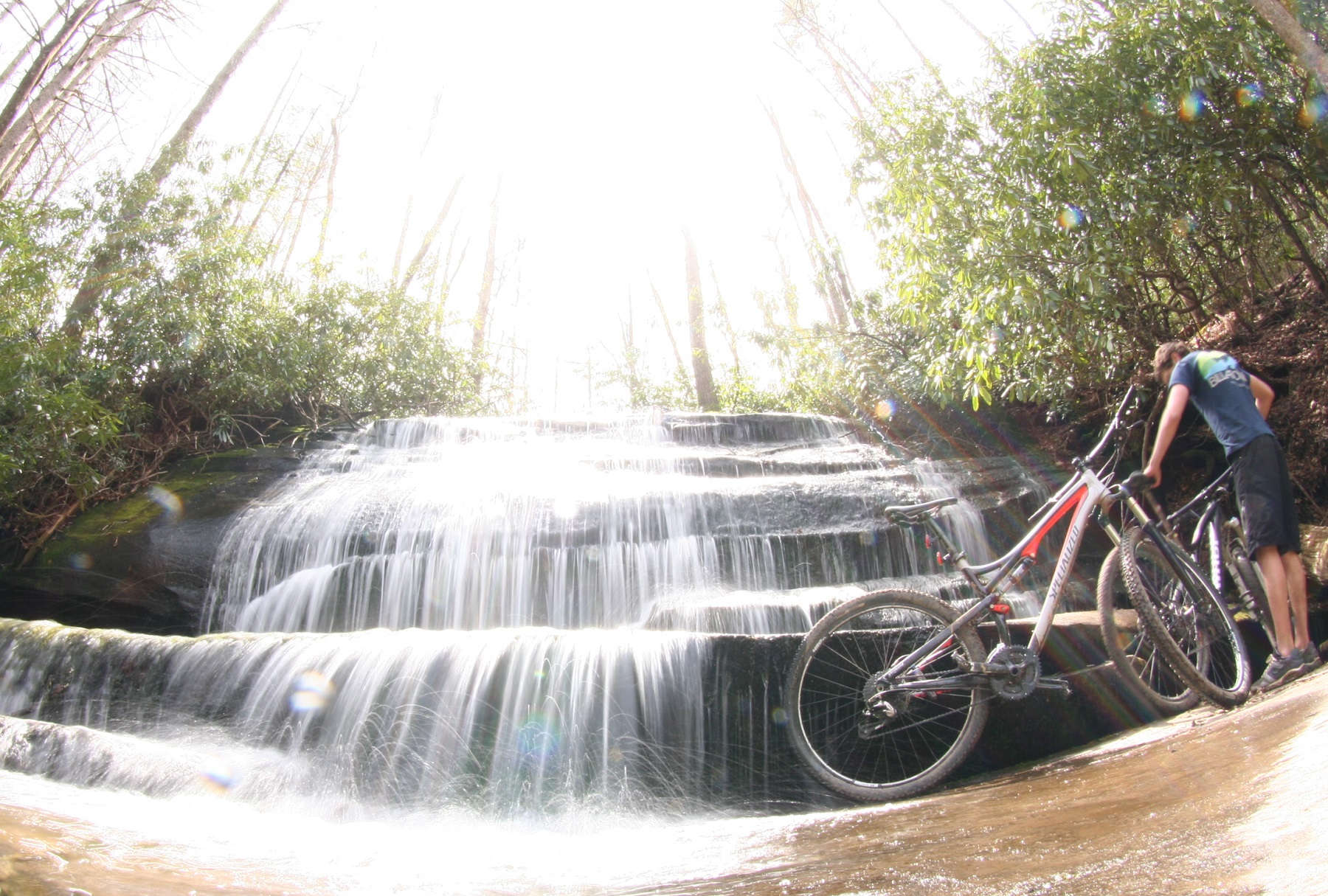
A waterfall in Pisgah National Forest, which can be reached from Butter Gap Trail.

Pisgah National Forest is a popular place for many activities, such as hiking, backpacking, road biking, mountain biking, fishing, and rock climbing. Popular mountain biking trails include Sycamore Cove Trail, and Black Mountain Loop. Farlow Gap is an expert-level trail, and considered "one of the toughest mountain bike trails in Pisgah National Forest."

== Waterfalls ==
These are some of the best waterfalls in Pisgah National Forest. While this is not an exhaustive list, these are some of the most popular among tourists and locals, based on beauty, accessibility, and hiking trail quality:

- Catawba Falls: Just under 3 miles round trip, this is a very comfortable hike for most visitors. This trail takes around 1-1.5 hours to complete.
- Cathey's Creek Falls: This 80-foot fall is hidden in a less visited area of Pisgah, close to Brevard NC. This is a steep and rugged trail, about 1/4 mile long. It will take around 0.5-1 hour to complete.
- Cedar Rock Falls: This is the first of several falls along a 1.8-mile moderate level hiking trail. It flows down moss-covered rocks, surrounded by North Carolina wildflowers like rhododendron and mountain laurel. This trail will take 1-1.25 hours.
- Cove Creek Falls: This 50-foot-tall fall is along a 2-mile trail that makes a short loop. It has a very nice walking trail that will take 2-2.5 hours to complete.
- Daniel Ridge Falls/Tom Spring's Falls: This fall is a skyscraper. It sits on a 1-mile trail to the falls, or you can trek the whole 4-mile loop that includes Daniel Ridge. The trip to the falls will take 0.5 hours.
- Elk River Falls: This hike is one of the favorites of any visitor. It sits in a break from the forestry, creating a stunning skyline right above the head of the falls. it is about 1 mile to the falls, taking about half an hour. It sits on the boundaries of the forest close to the Tennessee border. There are many sports to picnic or sunbathe along this trail.

== Wilderness areas ==
There are three officially designated wilderness areas lying within Pisgah National Forest that are part of the National Wilderness Preservation System.

- Linville Gorge Wilderness
- Middle Prong Wilderness
- Shining Rock Wilderness

== Gallery ==
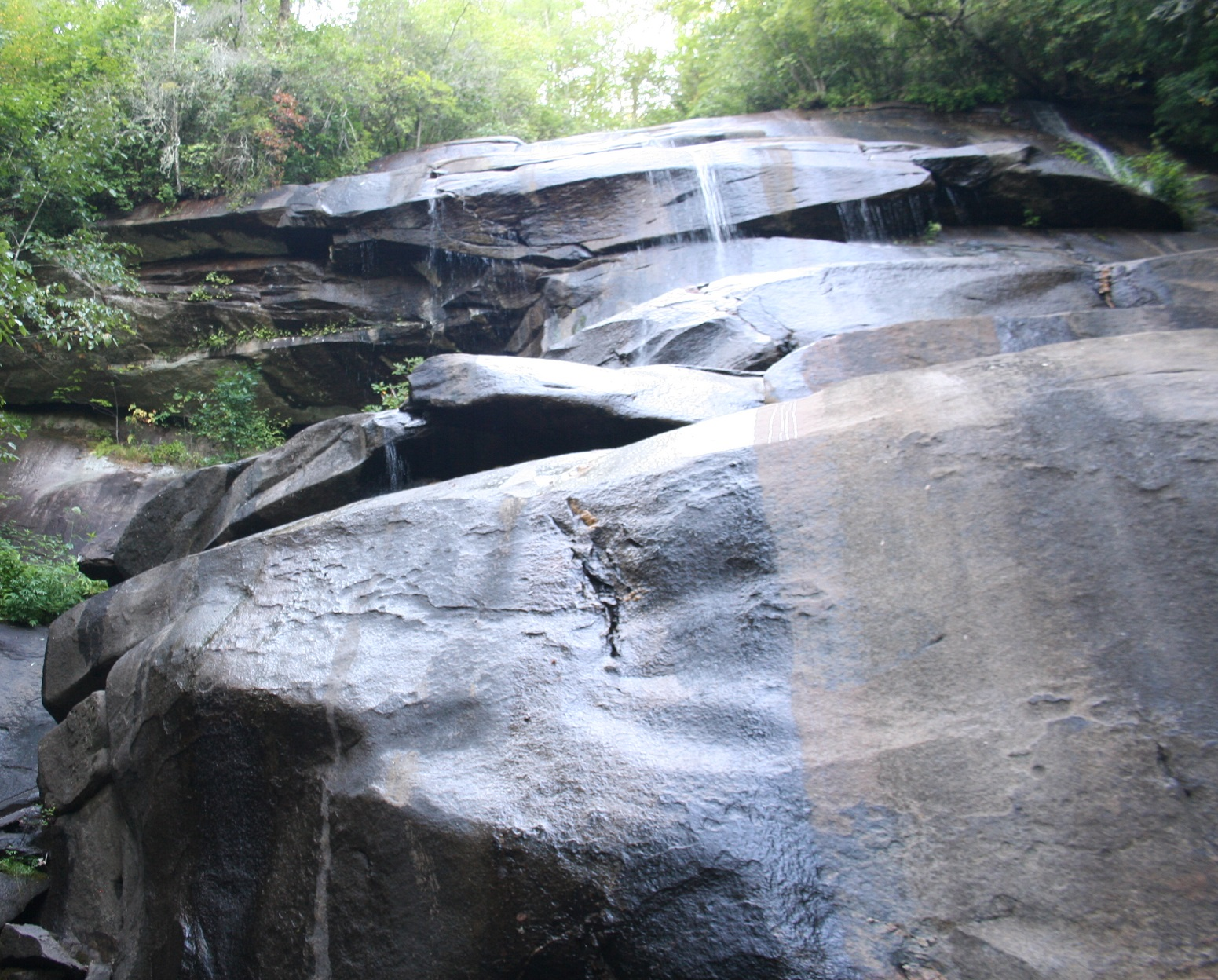
A waterfall which can be reached from Daniel Ridge Trail.

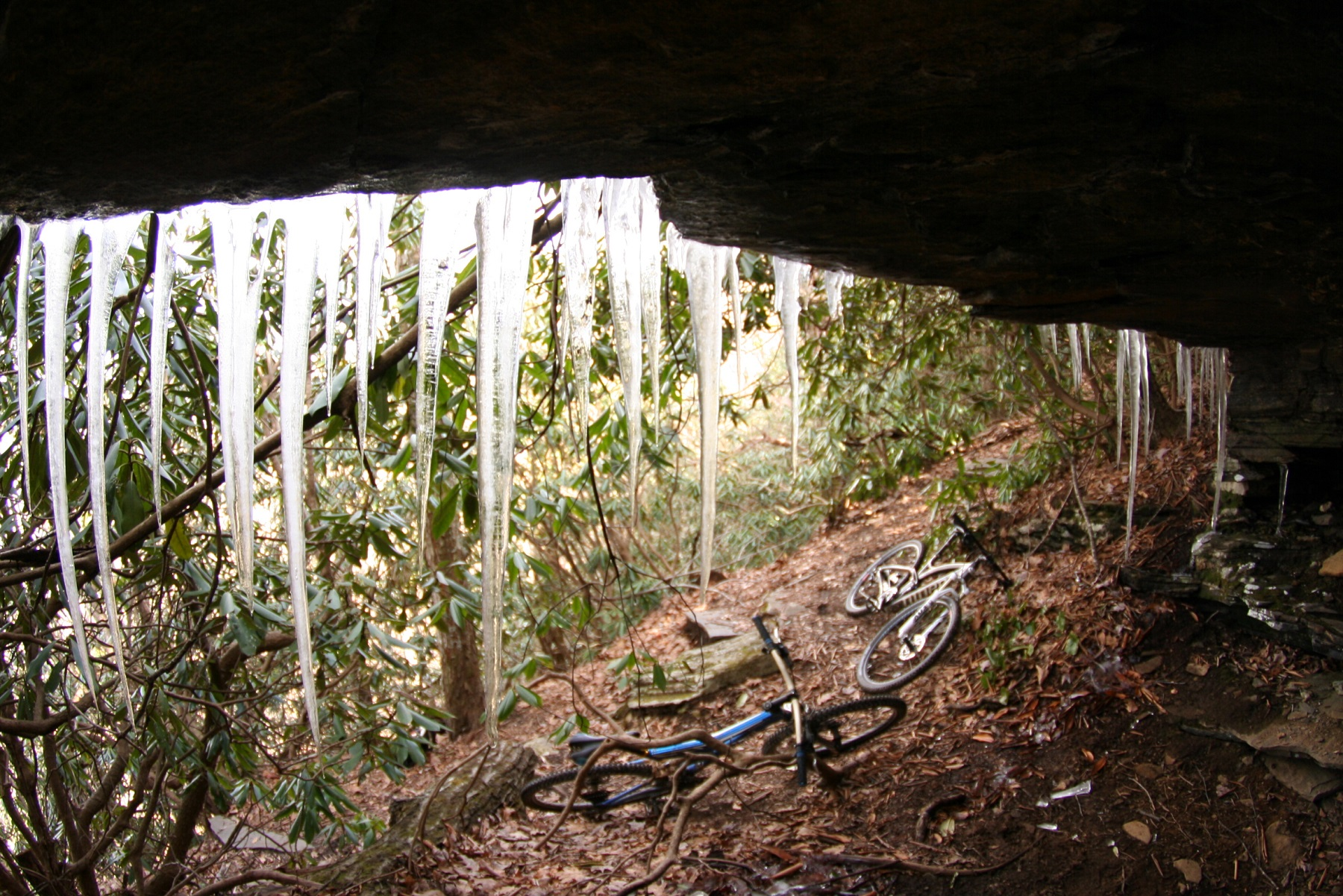
View from Black Mountain Trail, with icicles in the foreground.

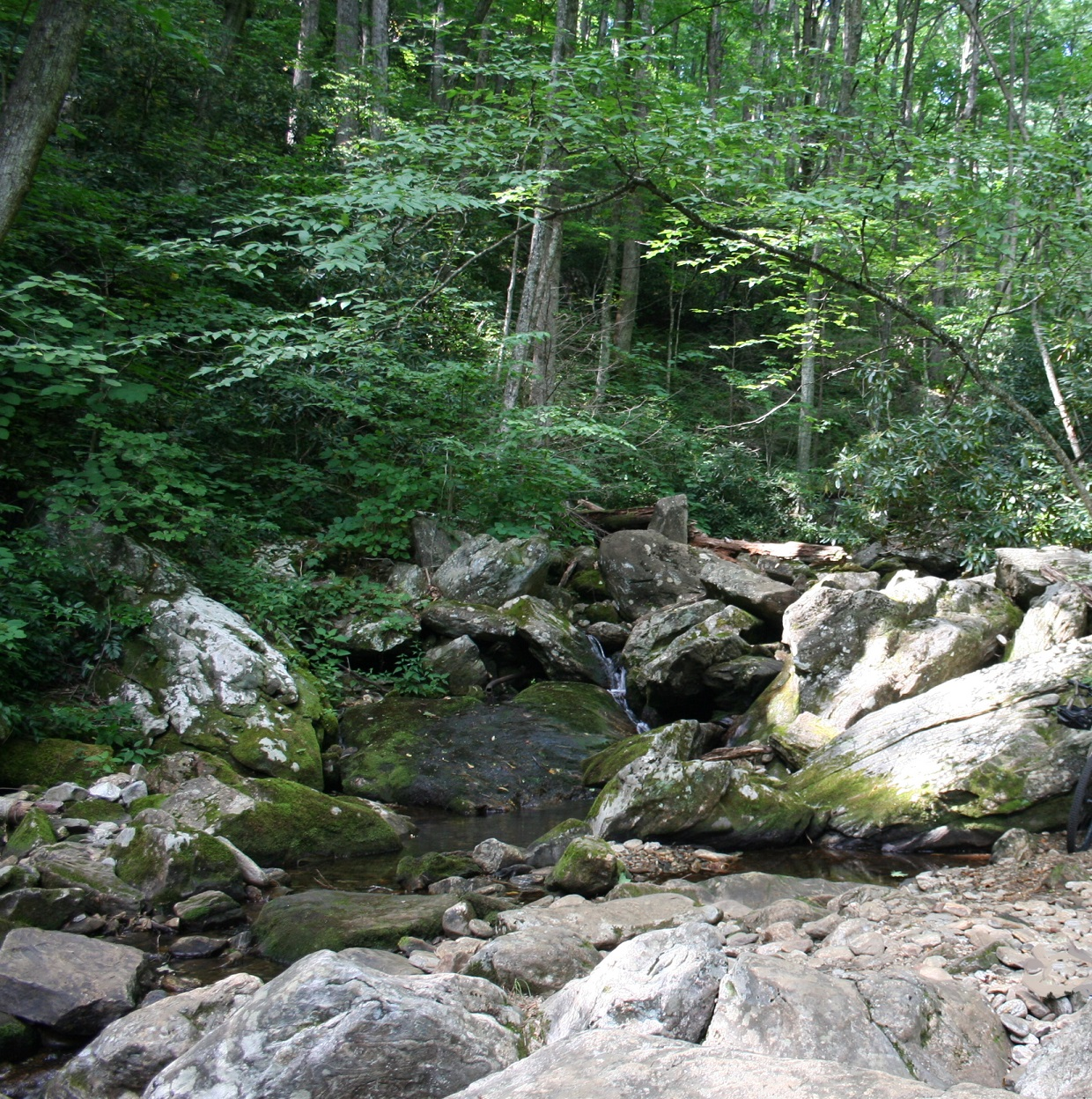
Creek running across Farlow Gap trail.

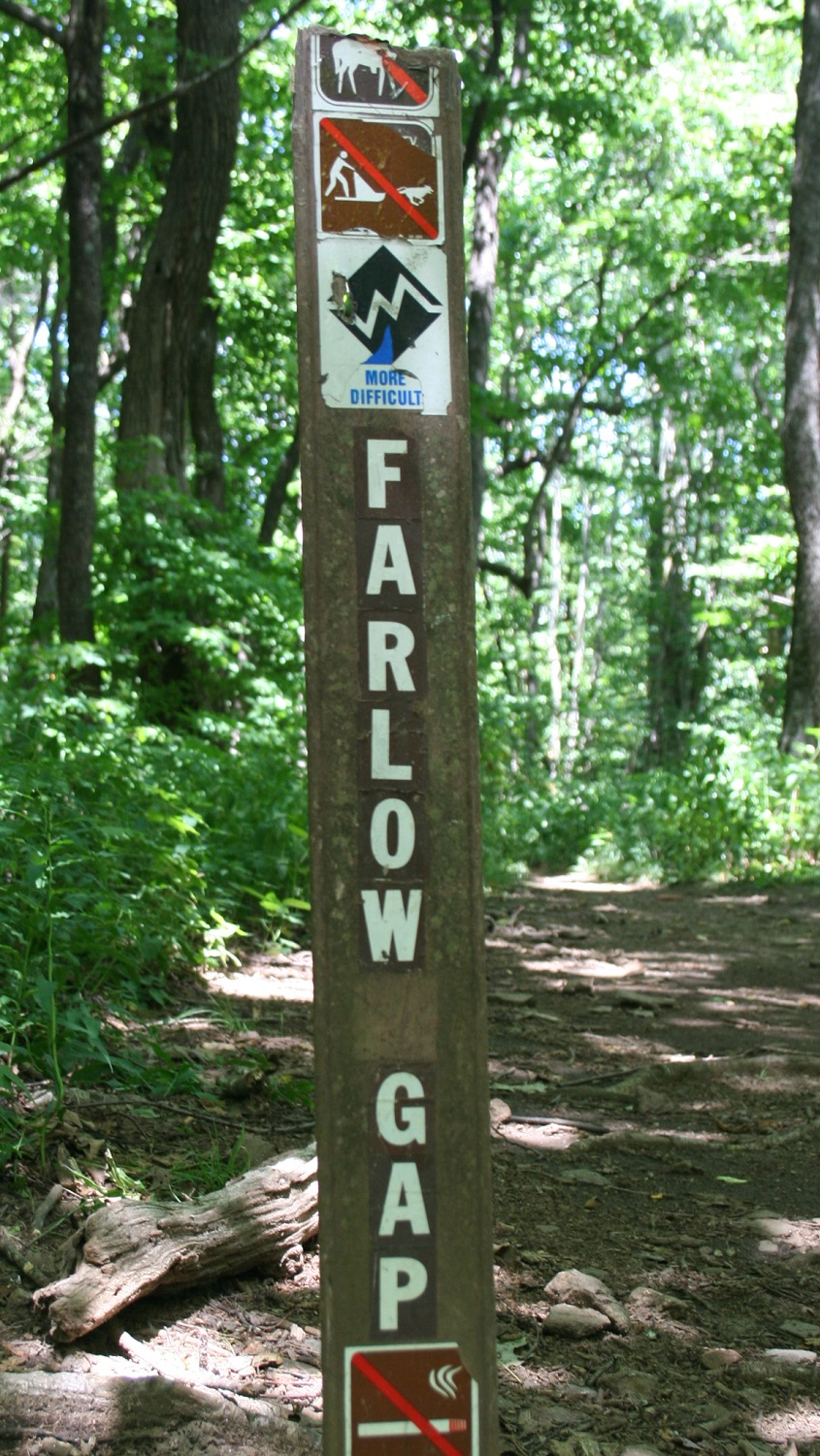
Sign at Farlow Gap trailhead (starting point of downhill bike trail).

== See also ==
- List of national forests of the United States
- Cherokee National Forest, the corresponding USNF across the border in Tennessee
- DuPont State Forest (also popular in western North Carolina for hiking and mountain biking)
- List of mountains in North Carolina
- Appalachian temperate rainforest
- Killing of Judy Smith
- Murder of Zebb Quinn
