= Stanley Farlow =

American mathematician

- Born: 1937
- Education: Oregon State University
- Scientific career
- Fields: Mathematics
- Workplaces: University of Maine
- Doctoral advisor: Ronald Bernard Guenther

Stanley Jerome Farlow (born 1937) is an American mathematician specializing in differential equations. For many years he has been a professor at the University of Maine.

== Life ==
Farlow earned a bachelor's degree in physics at Iowa State University and a master's degree in mathematics at the University of Iowa. From 1962 to 1968 he was a lieutenant commander in the PHS, completing his Ph.D. in mathematics at Oregon State University in 1967. His doctoral supervisor was Ronald Bernard Guenther, and his doctoral dissertation was on Existence Theorems for Periodic Solutions of Parabolic Partial Differential Equations.

He is currently a Professor Emeritus of Mathematics at the University of Maine.

== Books ==
Farlow is the author of several books in mathematics, including

- Partial Differential Equations for Scientists and Engineers (Wiley, 1982; Russian translation, Moscow: Mir, 1985; Dover, 1993)
- Applied Mathematics for Management, Life Science, and Social Science (with Gary M. Haggard, Random House, 1988)
- Finite Mathematics and Its Applications (with Gary M. Haggard, Random House, 1988; 2nd ed., McGraw Hill, 1994)
- Introduction to Calculus with Applications (with Gary M. Haggard, McGraw Hill, 1990)
- An Introduction to Differential Equations and Their Applications (McGraw Hill, 1994; Dover, 2006)
- Differential Equations and Linear Algebra (with James E. Hall, Jean Marie Mc Dill, and Beverly H. West, Prentice Hall, 2002)
- Paradoxes in Mathematics (Dover, 2014)
- Advanced Mathematics: A Transitional Reference (Wiley, 2020)

He is also the editor of:

- Self-Organizing Methods in Modeling: GMDH Type Algorithms (Marcel Dekker, 1984)
