= Farlow Gap =

Trail in North Carolina, United States

Farlow Gap Trail
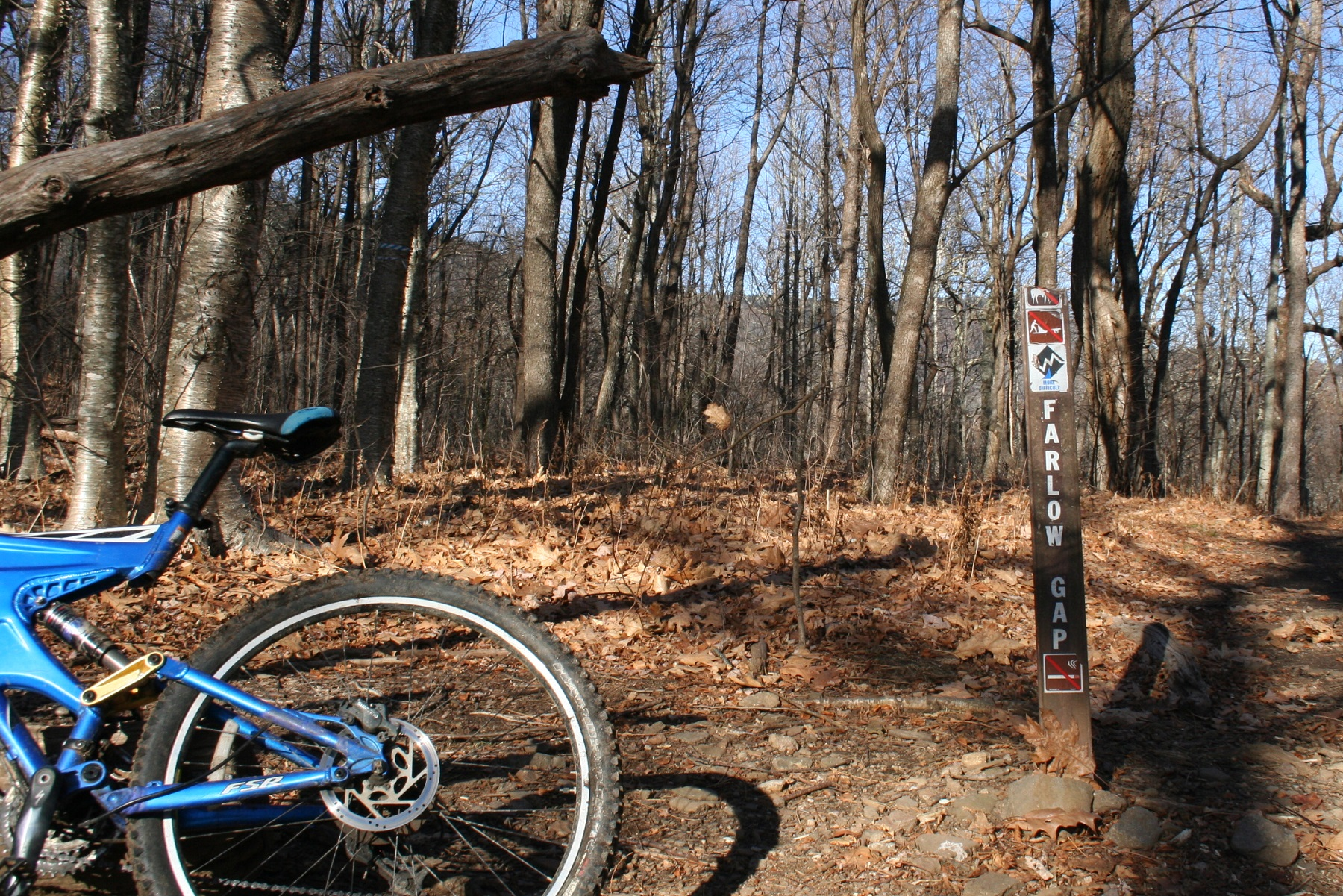
- Trailhead (Farlow Gap section)
- Length: 3.1 miles (5.0 km). About 14 miles (23 km) when combined with loop.
- Location: Pisgah National Forest, North Carolina, United States
- Trailheads: Cove Creek Davidson River Trailhead
- Use: Mountain biking (primary), Hiking (secondary)
- Highest point: 4,527 ft (1,380 m)
- Lowest point: 3,313 ft (1,010 m)
- Grade: 11% (average)
- Difficulty: Hiking — strenuous with technical sections. Mountain biking — Double-black (most difficult).
- Season: All
- Sights: Toms Spring Falls (near start of extended loop)
- Hazards: steep grades, large drops, tree roots, unimproved creek crossings.
- Surface: rock, hardpack, gravel.

Location
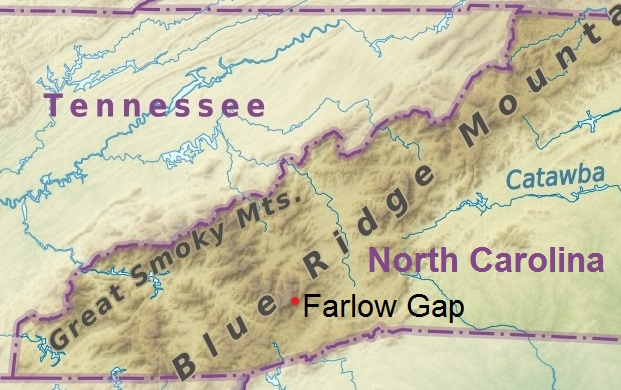
- Farlow Gap is in the western region of North Carolina in Pisgah National Forest

Farlow Gap is a popular trail for mountain biking and hiking, located in the western area of North Carolina. It is an expert-level trail, and considered "one of the toughest mountain bike trails in Pisgah National Forest." It is primarily a downhill trail, about 3.1 miles (5.0 km) in length. It can be combined with other trails to form a loop of about 14 miles (23 km), requiring anywhere from three to six hours to complete.

== Description ==
Nearly the entire trail is singletrack, and starts with a relatively flat section but quickly becomes fall line into a rock garden. It has been described as "brutal" and is one of the steepest and rockiest downhill trails in Pisgah National Forest. Many people ride to the left or right of the rock garden, or dismount and walk on one side of it. The trail drops about 2,000 feet (610 m) in 3 miles (4.8 km), then connects with the Daniel Ridge trail. After the early steep sections, the remainder of the trail includes some short uphill sections, other rocky areas, occasional drops, and other technical sections. The trail also crosses several small creeks, including Shuck Ridge Creek, and one fork of the Davidson River.

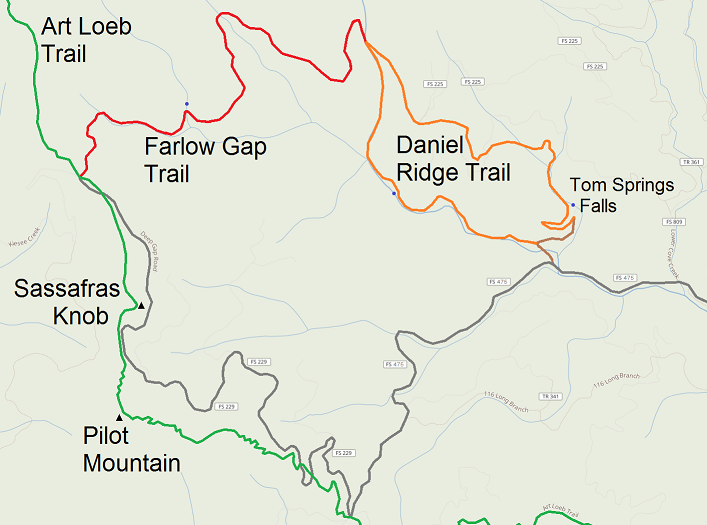
Trail map, also showing some adjoining trails and forest service roads.

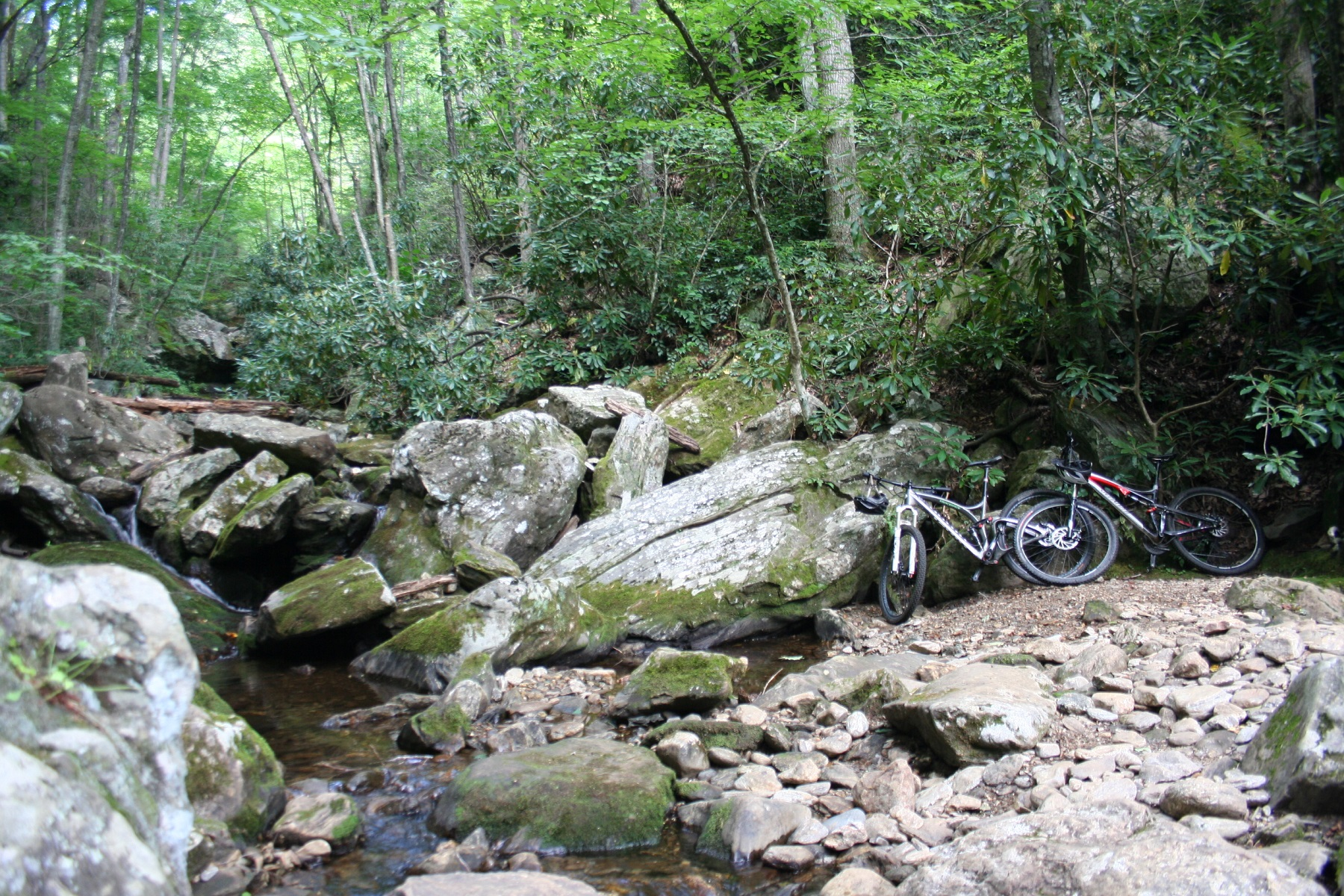
A creek running across Farlow Gap trail. The trail is unimproved, so mountain bikers and hikers find their own path to cross the creek.

Farlow Gap is usually ridden as part of a loop. This requires riding to the top, starting for example from near the trailhead of the Daniel Ridge Trail, and riding a mostly uphill route of about 9 miles (14 km) on a doubletrack trail. A short section of this route runs parallel to, and twice crosses the Art Loeb Trail, shortly before arriving at the starting point of Farlow Gap. After completing the Farlow Gap section, the trail links with Daniel Ridge Trail, which can be taken in one of two directions. Both directions feature more flowy technical riding, both of which return to the start point. A separate short ride from the Daniel Ridge Trail can be taken to see Toms Spring Falls. (Note: Toms Spring Falls: some maps and earlier sources use the name "Daniel Ridge Falls".)

== Other activities ==
This trail is used mainly by mountain bikers, but can be equally enjoyed by hikers. Due to the steepness of many sections, horseback riding, and sled-dogging is prohibited. Challenges for hikers include a long strenuous climb when hiking the trail as a loop, rocky sections, and crossing small creeks. Trail rules require mountain bikers to yield to hikers; nevertheless, hikers should be watchful of mountain bike traffic. Mountain bike races sometimes include Farlow Gap as a section of the race, and hikers should either avoid the trail on these days, or be especially watchful. The trail crosses several creeks where water bottles can be filled.

== Animals, plants, and geology ==
There is a variety of birds, reptiles and mammals in the area. Deer, rabbits and bobcats may be spotted by watchful hikers and mountain bikers. Farlow Gap and the Daniel Ridge Trail pass through forests with diverse tree species, including yellow poplar, red oak, black gum, and red maple. Rhododendron also grows abundantly (sometimes called laurel), and remains green all year, its leaves curling in the winter.

== History ==
The early history of Farlow Gap trail is unclear. Geological documents from the 1940s identify a small mica mine located on the trail. Small flakes of the shiny mineral are often seen alongside the trail. The site has also been alternately identified as "Furlow Gap" or "Furlough Gap" in old historical records.

== Photo gallery ==
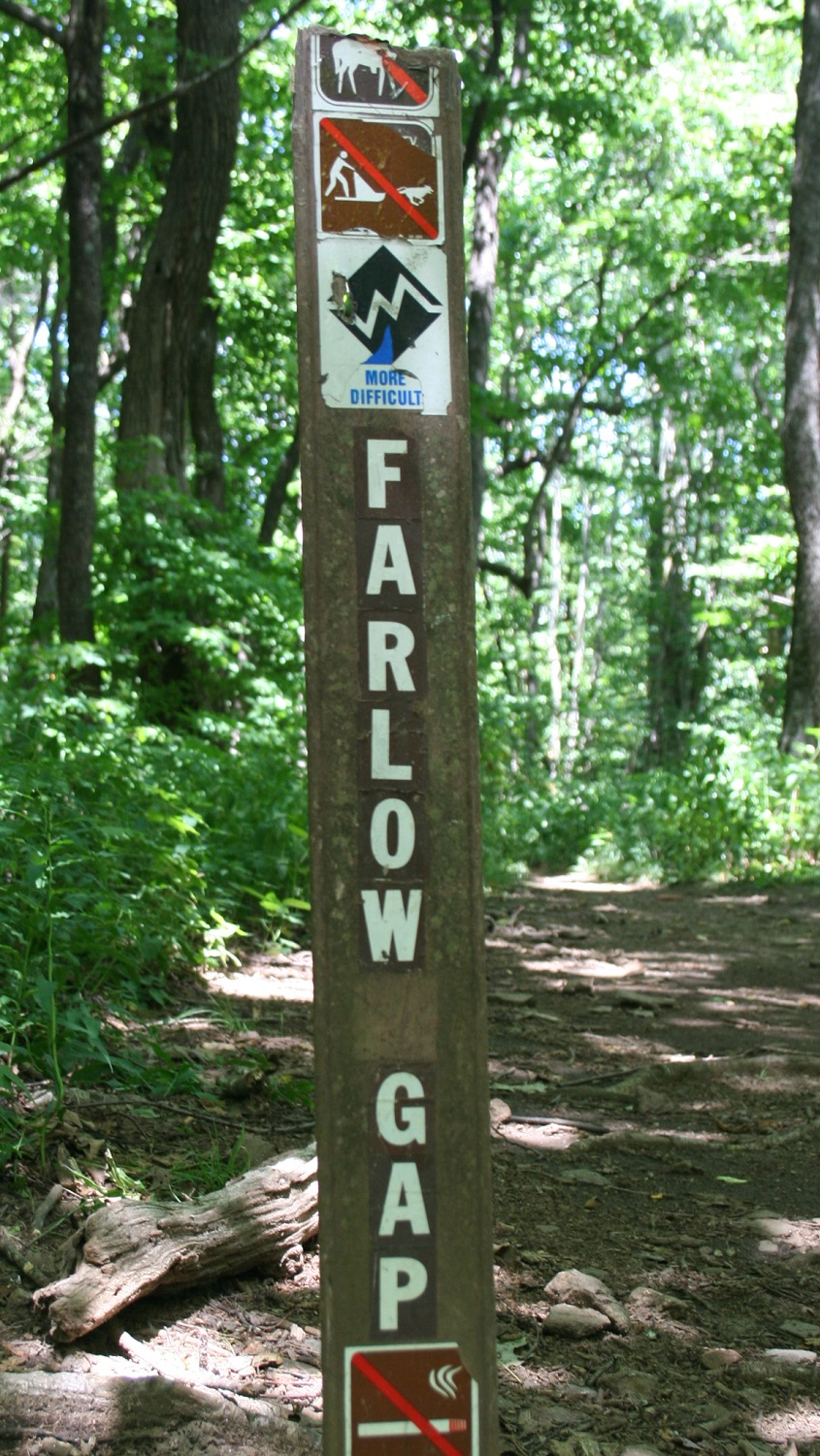
Sign at trailhead (Farlow Gap downhill section)

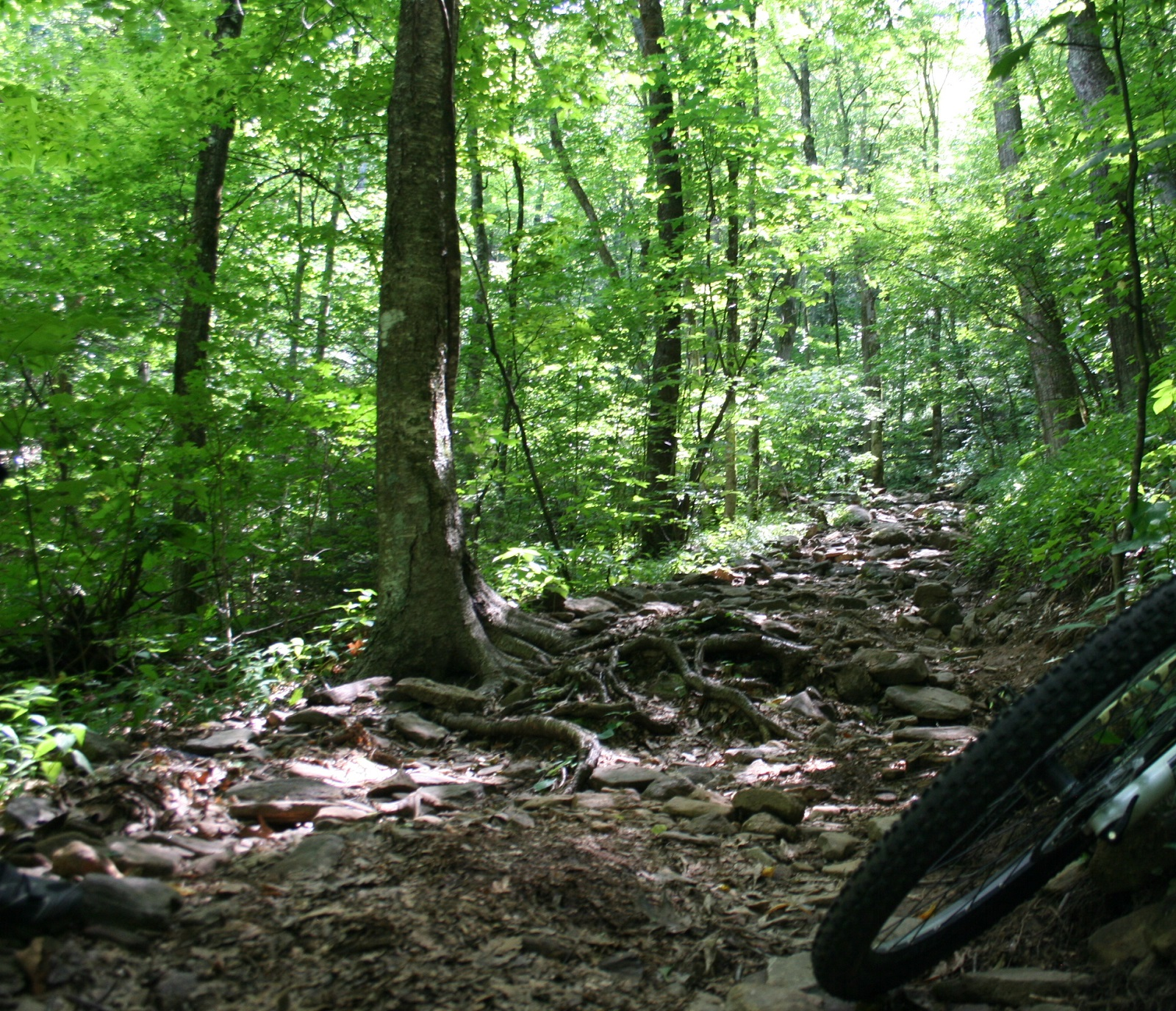
A downhill section.

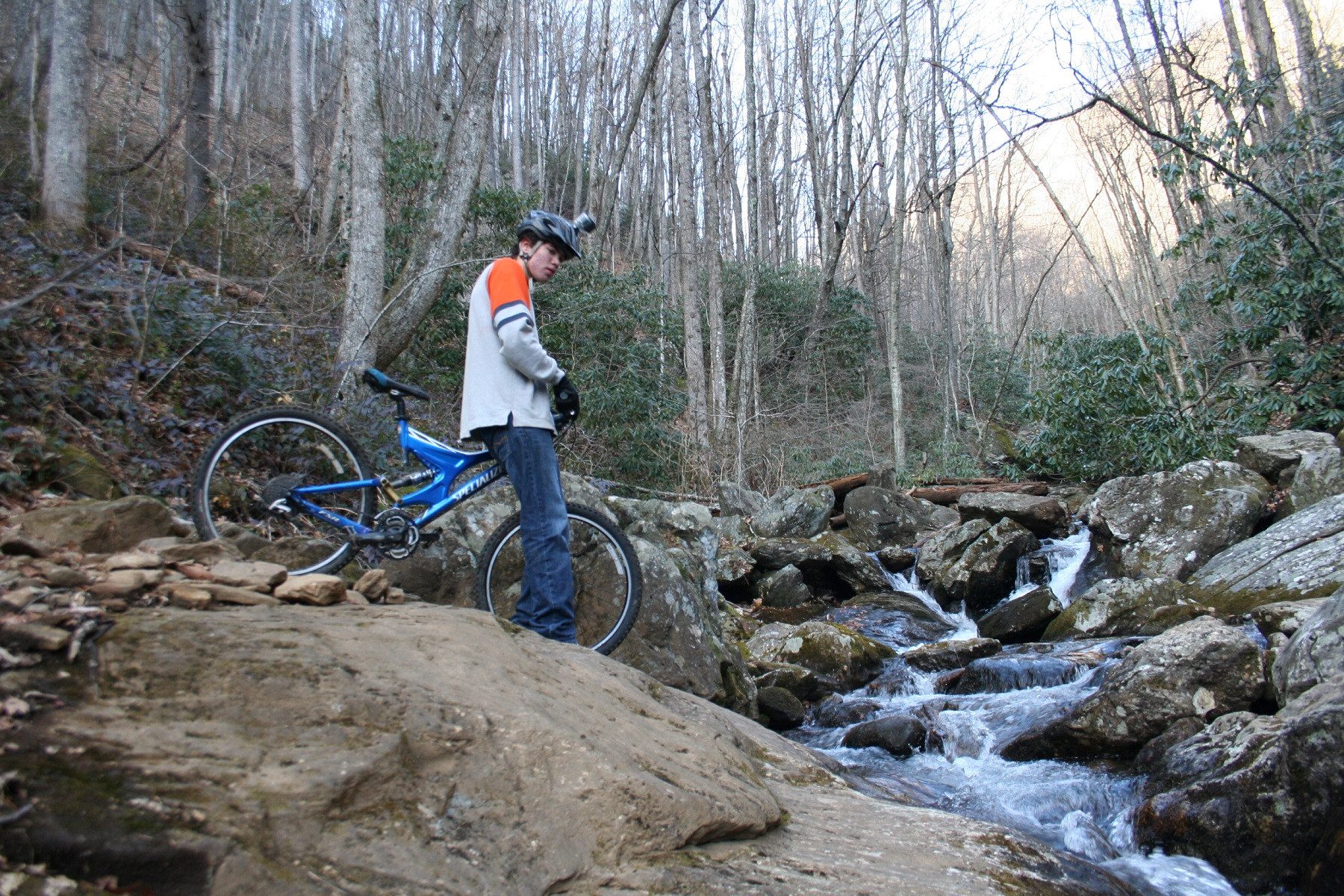
A creek running across the trail

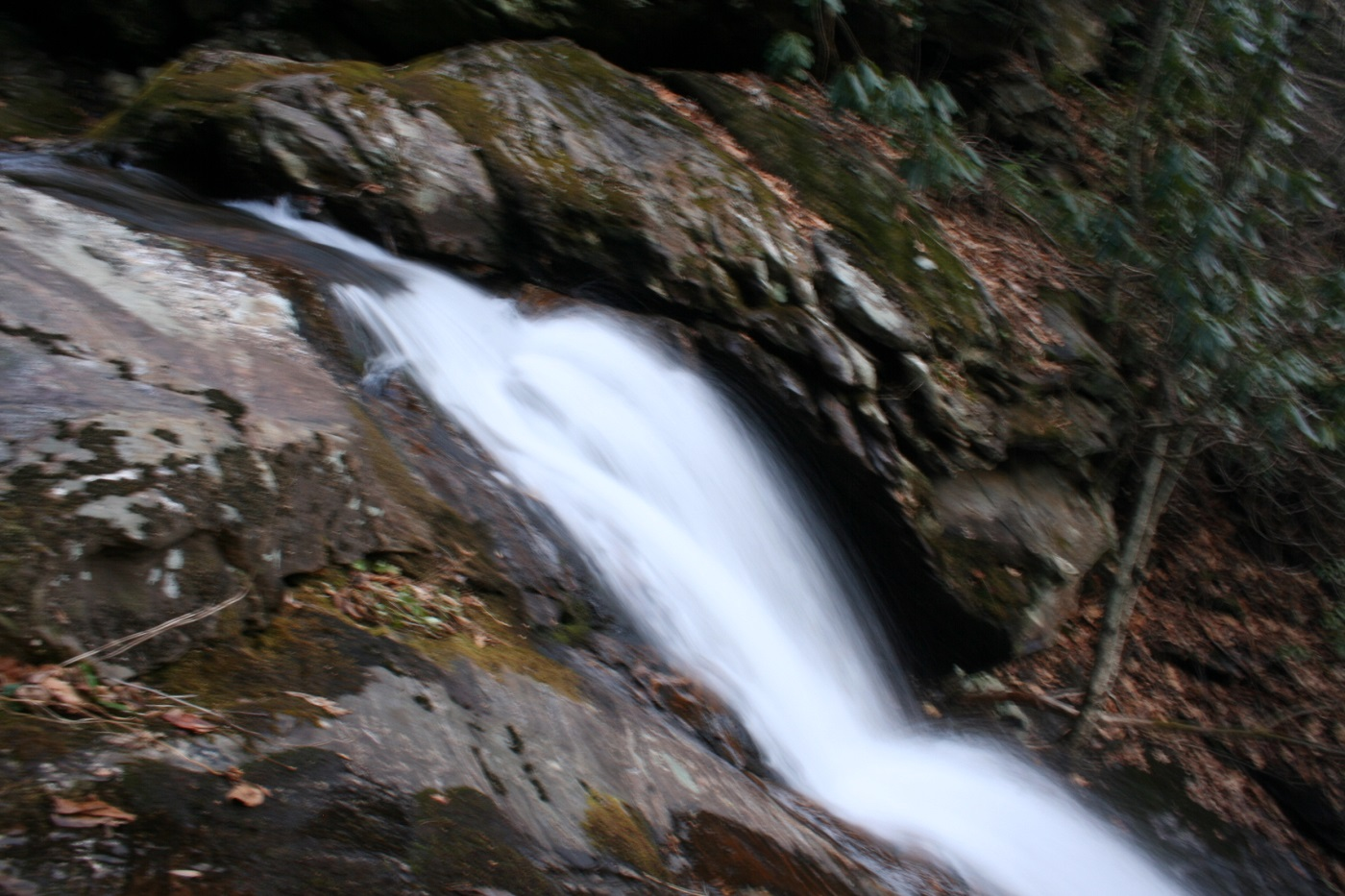
A small waterfall visible from the trail

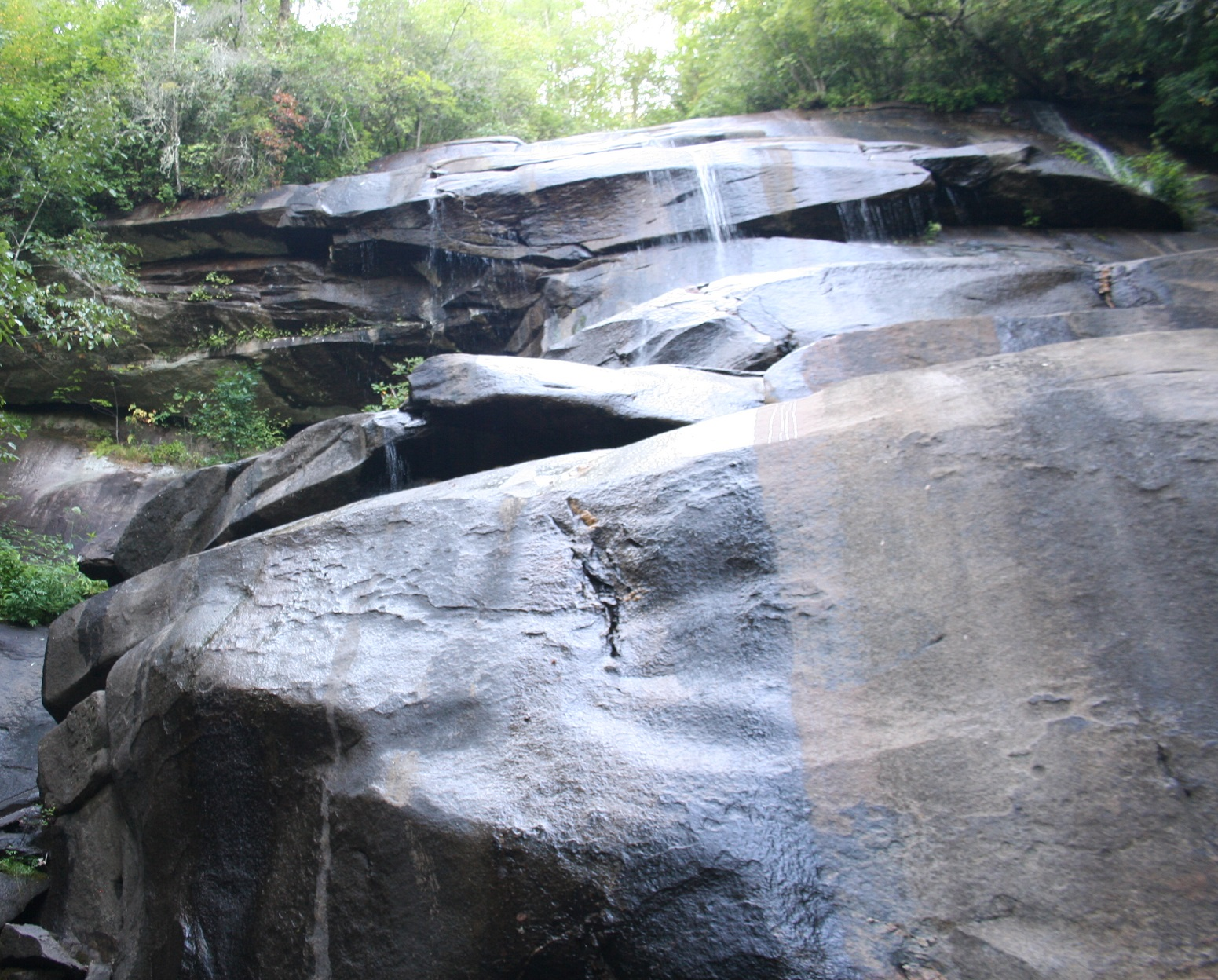
Toms Spring Falls can be reached from Daniel Ridge Trail.

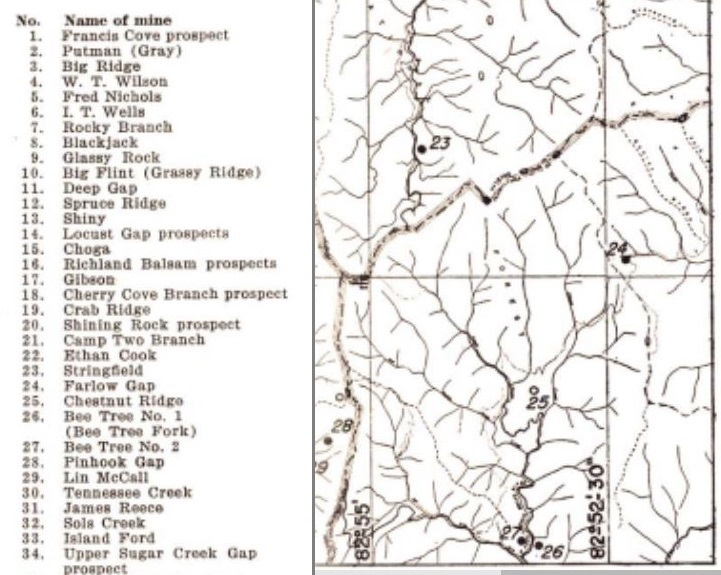
A geological survey published in 1946 shows Farlow Gap (#24) as the site of a mica mine.

== See also ==
- Hiking
- Mountain biking
- Downhill mountain biking
- Mountain bike
- Downhill bike
- Enduro (mountain biking)
- Glossary of cycling
