= Farlow and Kenrick Parks Historic District =

Historic district in Massachusetts, United States

- U.S. National Register of Historic Places
- U.S. Historic district
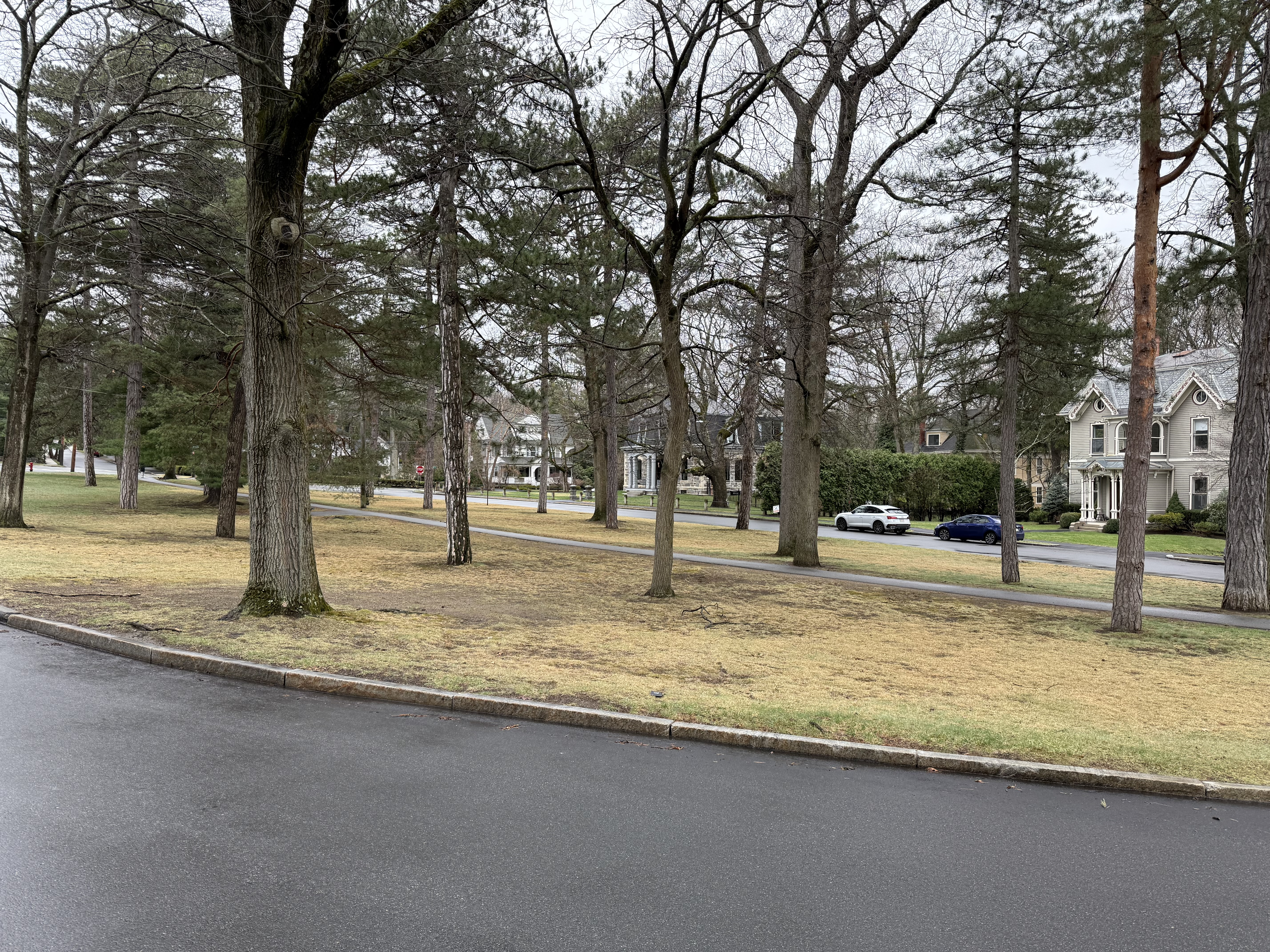
- Kenrick Park (2025)

- Location within Massachusetts Location within the United States
- Location: Roughly bounded by Franklin, Park, Church, Center and Wesley Sts. and Maple Ave., Newton, Massachusetts
- Coordinates: 42°21′12″N 71°11′7″W
- Area: 60 acres (24 ha)
- Architect: Multiple
- Architectural style: Colonial Revival, Greek Revival, Late Victorian
- MPS: Newton MRA (AD)
- NRHP reference No.: 82002745 (original); 86001739 (increase)

Significant dates
- Added to NRHP: July 08, 1982
- Boundary increase: September 4, 1986

The Farlow and Kenrick Parks Historic District is a predominantly residential historic district in the Newton Corner area of Newton, Massachusetts. The district is roughly triangular in shape, and is bounded on the north by the Massachusetts Turnpike, Park Street to the east, and Franklin and Newtonville Avenues to the west. It is roughly bisected by Church Street, and is named for two parks that are significant focal elements of the district. Kenrick Park is a small lozenge-shaped park at the southern tip of the district designed by Alexander Wadsworth; it was laid out at the request of William Kenrick, a horticulturalist whose c. 1822 Federal style house was moved to the area after the park was completed. Farlow Park is a larger rectangular park, in the district's northwest, which was established by a gift from John Farlow. It is landscaped in a manner similar to the Boston Public Garden, with specimen trees and an artificial pond with bridge.

The district was one of the first major areas of suburban residential development in Newton, spurred by the railroad station at Newton Corner, and the development of streetcar lines. There was some early development in the 1840s, resulting in a number of Greek Revival and Italianate houses being built in the area, but major development occurred between 1870 and 1910, resulting in a significant number of Queen Anne and Colonial Revival houses. The district includes a number of significant churches: the 1885 Immanuel Baptist Church, designed by H. H. Richardson; the 1897 Newton Methodist Episcopal Church by Cram, Wentworth and Goodhue; and the 1873 Grace Episcopal Church designed by Alexander Rice Esty.

The district was listed on the National Register of Historic Places in 1982, and expanded in 1986, adding a section of Park Street near the southern tip of Kenrick Park.

== Gallery ==
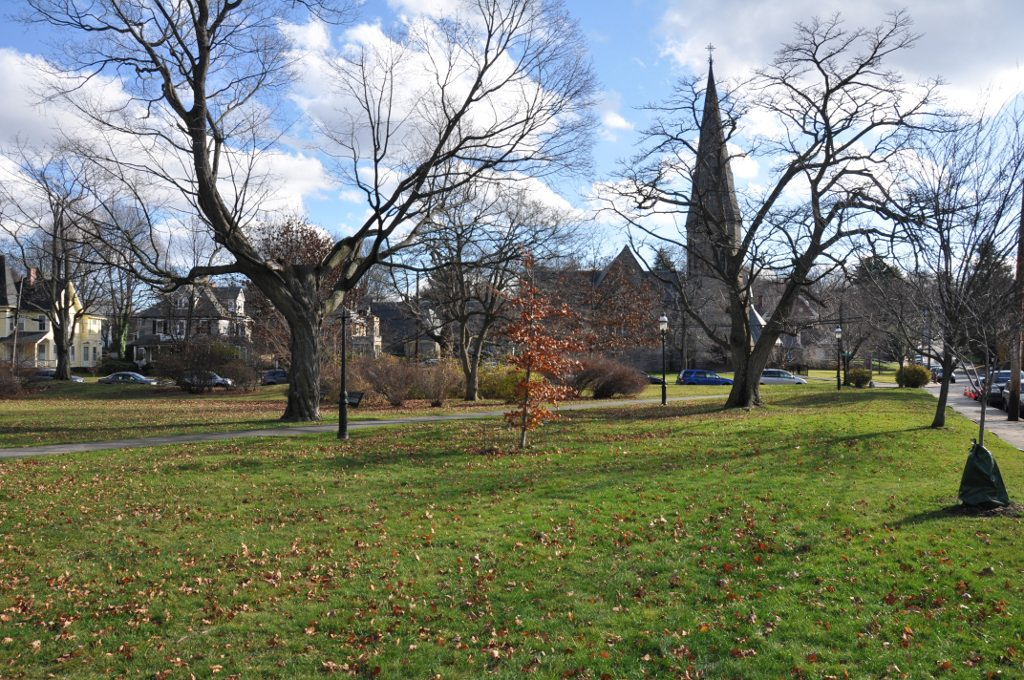
Farlow Park

== See also ==
- National Register of Historic Places listings in Newton, Massachusetts
