= Bent Creek Campus of the Appalachian Forest Experiment Station =

Historic district in North Carolina, United States

- U.S. National Register of Historic Places
- U.S. Historic district
- Location within North Carolina Location within the United States
- Location: Brevard Rd. S of jct. with I-26, near Asheville, North Carolina
- Coordinates: 35°30′09″N 82°35′49″W
- Area: 20 acres (8.1 ha)
- Built: 1925—1934
- Architect: Bearden, Walter C.; Pyke, Charles F.
- Architectural style: Rustic, Bungalow/craftsman
- NRHP reference No.: 93000373
- Added to NRHP: April 29, 1993, December 30, 1996 (Boundary Decrease)

Bent Creek Campus of the Appalachian Forest Experiment Station is a national historic district located near Asheville, in the Appalachian Mountains, Buncombe County, North Carolina. The district encompasses 16 contributing buildings and 1 contributing structure associated with the Bent Creek Experimental Forest of the Pisgah National Forest.

== Architecture ==
The campus has two sections:

- west section centered on an insectary and a garage dating to 1925–1928.
- east section with laboratories, insectaries, residences, and auxiliary buildings dating to 1931–1934.

The buildings are typically one-story high (often with basement or garret stories), of frame construction in the Rustic Style.

It was listed on the National Register of Historic Places in 1993, with a boundary decrease in 1996.
