= Henry Mills Alden =

American author and magazine editor

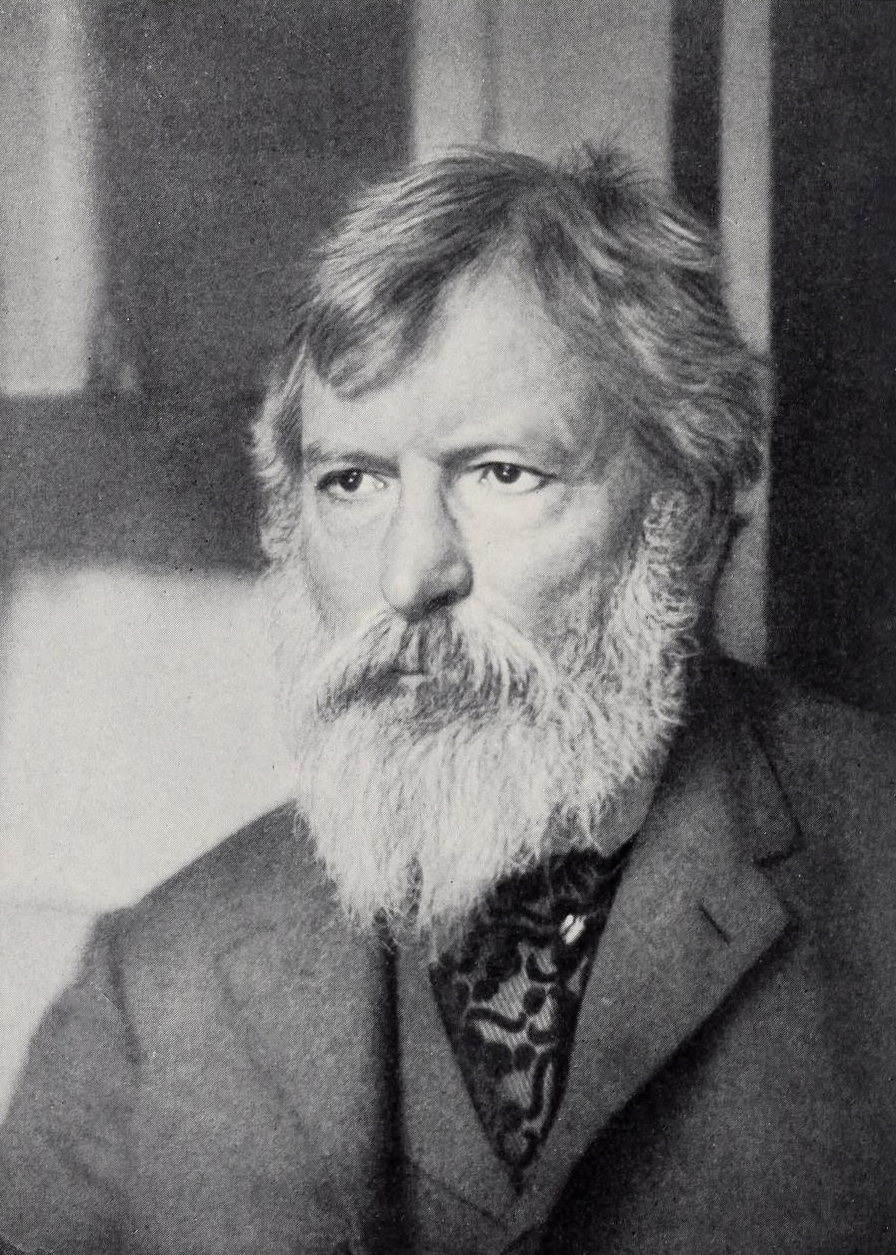
- Born: November 11, 1836; Mount Tabor, Vermont
- Died: October 7, 1919 (aged 82); New York City, New York
- Education: Williams College, Andover Theological Seminary
- Spouses: Susan F. Foster (m. 1861) Ada Foster Murray (m. 1900)
- Relatives: John Alden

Henry Mills Alden (November 11, 1836 – October 7, 1919) was an American author and editor of Harper's Magazine from 1869 until 1919.

== Biography ==
=== Early years and education ===
Henry Mills Alden was born on November 11, 1836, in Mount Tabor, Vermont to Ira Alden and Elizabeth Moore Alden. His earliest American ancestor was John Alden, and his mother was a niece of the academic Zephaniah Swift Moore, who served as president of Amherst College and Williams College. When he was eight years old, his family moved to Hoosick Falls, New York. He attended public schools in Rensselaer County with intervals working at a cotton factory before he enlisted at Ball Seminary in Hoosick Falls.

Alden enrolled at Williams College at the age of sixteen. At Williams, he chose to study psychology and classics over advanced mathematics, which deprived him of academic honors. He graduated with the class of 1857 and entered Andover Theological Seminary, which he chose for its large library of Greek literature. While studying at Andover, Alden became an acquaintance and frequent guest of the abolitionist and author Harriet Beecher Stowe. Stowe read some of his earliest published work and forwarded two of his essays on the Eleusinian Mysteries in Greek theology, entitled "The Eleusinia" and "The Saviors of Greece," to James Russell Lowell, who published them in The Atlantic Monthly in 1859 and 1860.

In 1860, he was elected by the Williams College faculty to deliver its master's oration, which he delivered on the subject of Hellenic masculinity. Because the oration was scheduled for the same day as his graduation from the seminary, he received a leave of absence. However, he wrote the class hymn for the Andover ceremonies and was credited with an oration on the theology of Homer.

Alden received a Doctor of Laws degree from Williams College in 1888.

=== Early writings ===
Although Alden's graduation from seminary licensed him to become a preacher, he never joined a religious order. After graduation, he returned to Hoosick Falls to care for his father, who was suffering from palsy. He supported his parents by preaching in the neighborhood. While in Hoosick Falls, he continued his work on Greek theology, using his notes to develop six more essays for The Atlantic in spring 1861. However, they were ignored by the magazine's new publishers, Phillips Sampson & Co.

In spring 1861, his brother took over care of their parents, and Alden moved to New York City, where his only acquaintance was college classmate Horace Scudder. After failing to meet the physical requirements for enlistment in the Union army, Alden found work as a history and literature teacher at private schools, supplementing his meager income with editorial articles in the New York Evening Post and The New York Times. He was married to Susan Frye Foster, whom he met while at Andover.

=== Harper's ===
In 1863, James T. Fields sought out Alden after reading his earlier submissions to The Atlantic. Fields had brought the essays with him abroad and shared them with Ralph Waldo Emerson, John Amory Lowell, and others. Although the essays were deemed too obscure for publication, Fields paid Alden $300 for them and further offered him a course of twelve lectures before the Lowell Institute in Boston on Greek paganism. While preparing for the Lowell Institute lectures, Alden became an associate editor of Harper's Magazine alongside Alfred H. Guernsey, with whom he collaborated on writing a visual history of the American Revolution. After the lectures, Alden was additionally hired as managing editor of Harper's Weekly, the weekly political journal of the magazine.

In 1869, Alden succeeded Guernsey as the editor of Harper's Magazine, which he remained for one half century until his death in 1919. He hired William Dean Howells as a columnist in 1885.

=== Personal life and death ===
He married Susan Frye Foster (1840–1895) of North Andover, Massachusetts on July 3, 1861. They met while he was a student at the seminary and had four children:

- Charles (b. 1862, died in infancy)
- Annie Fields (b. 1864, d. 1912)
- Harriet (b. 1868)
- Carolyn Wyndham (b. 1871, d. 1916)

He married Ada Foster Murray on February 22, 1900 in Metuchen, New Jersey. His stepdaughter from this marriage, Aline Murray Kilmer, was a published poet and wife of Joyce Kilmer.

Alden was an early member of the American Academy of Arts and Letters.

He died on October 7, 1919, in his home at 521 West 112th Street in New York City.

== Works ==
His personal publications include:

- The Ancient "Lady of Sorrow", a poem (1871)
- God in His World: an Interpretation (1890), a book published anonymously
- A Study of Death (1895)
- Magazine Writing and the New Literature (1908) LCCN 08-28839
- "The Other Side of Mortality" in In After Days: Thoughts on the Future Life (1910)

He also edited a series of Harper's Novelettes with William Dean Howells in 1906 and 1907:

- Different Girls (1906)
- The Heart of Childhood (1906)
- Quaint Courtships (1906)
- Their Husband's Wives (1906)
- Under the Sunset (1906)
- Life at High Tide (1907)
- Shapes that Haunt the Dusk (1907)
- Southern Lights and Shadows (1907)
