= Aline Murray Kilmer =

American poet (1888–1941)

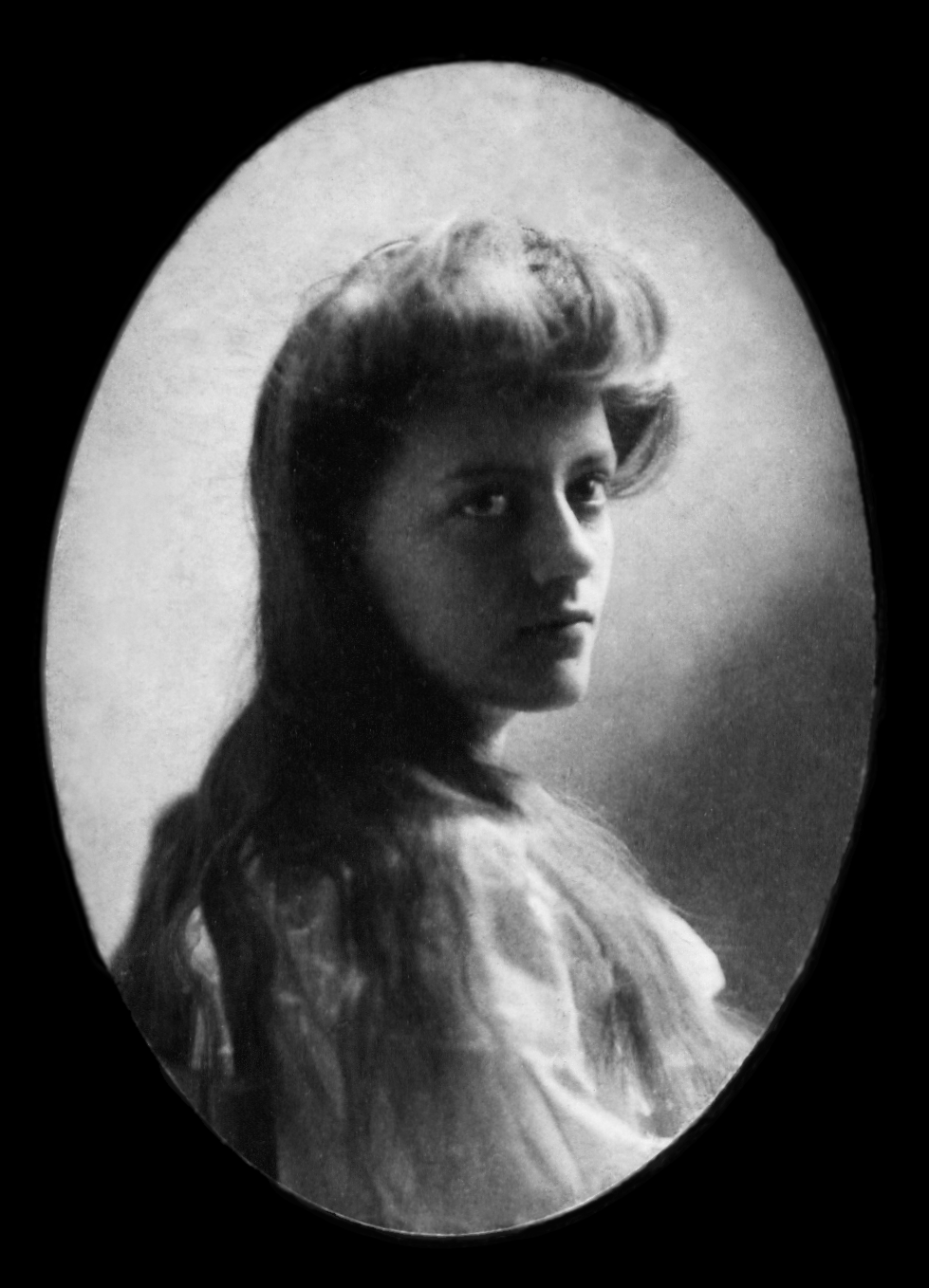
Kilmer as a young woman

Aline Murray Kilmer (August 1, 1888 – October 1, 1941), was an American poet, children's book author, and essayist, and the wife and widow of poet and journalist Joyce Kilmer (1886-1918). The couple attended Rutgers College Preparatory School and married shortly after his graduation from Columbia University in 1908.

In their ten-year marriage her husband had achieved fame as a poet, literary critic and among Catholic circles as America's most prominent Catholic writer. After his death in World War I, she began publishing her own poetry and a few children's books. Today, copies of her works can still be found, some on archive.org.

== Biography ==
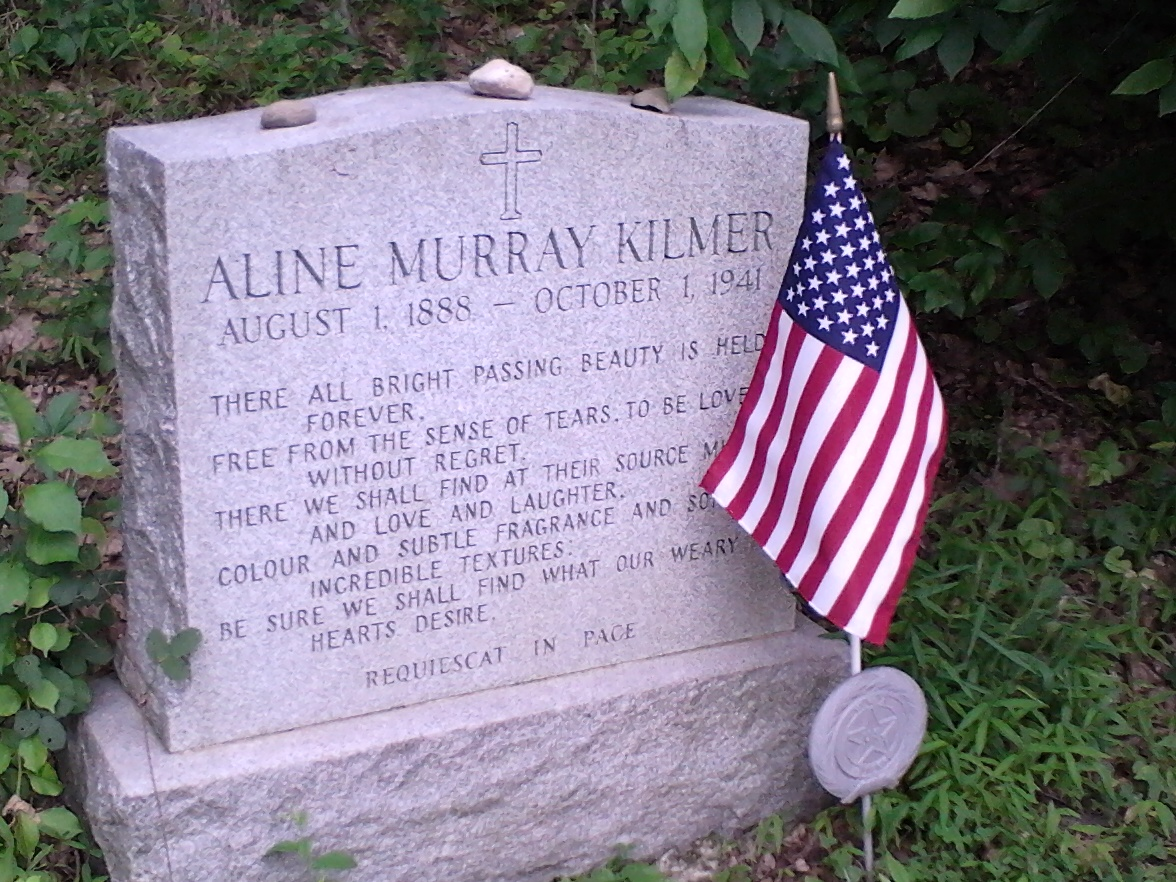
The gravestone of Aline Kilmer, located in Saint Joseph's Cemetery in Newton, New Jersey

She was born as Aline Murray on August 1, 1888, in Norfolk, Virginia, the daughter of Ada (née Foster) Murray, a poet; and Kenton C. Murray, editor of the Norfolk Landmark newspaper. Ada Murray remarried on February 22, 1900 in Metuchen, New Jersey to Henry Mills Alden, the managing editor of Harper's Magazine; he became Aline's stepfather.

Aline Murray was educated at the Rutgers College Grammar School (now Rutgers Preparatory School) in New Brunswick, New Jersey, and the Vail-Deane School in Elizabeth, New Jersey, the latter institution from which she was graduated in 1908.

Shortly after graduation, Aline married Alfred Joyce Kilmer on June 9, 1908, after he was graduated from Columbia University in New York City. The pair had five children: Kenton Sinclair Kilmer (1909-1995), Rose Kilburn Kilmer (1912-1917), Deborah Clanton Kilmer (1914–1999; who became a nun, "Sister Michael", at Saint Benedict Monastery, St. Joseph, Minnesota), Michael Barry Kilmer (1916-1927) and Christopher Kilmer (1917-1984).

Their daughter Rose was stricken with an infantile paralysis shortly after her birth, a crisis which led Joyce and Aline to convert to Roman Catholicism. Shortly before Joyce's deployment to France in World War I, Rose Kilburn Kilmer died, predeceasing both her parents. During his deployment, her husband was killed in action during the Second Battle of the Marne near Muercy Farm, beside the Ourcq River near the French village of Seringes-et-Nesles on July 30, 1918 at the age of 31. In 1927, her second son, Michael Barry Kilmer, predeceased her.

After Joyce was killed in action, his widow turned to publishing her poetry and to authoring children's books. Her poetry has been described as "subtle, delicate, and somewhat subdued — certainly far from gayety", and with a tone of "ironic disillusionment" compared to her husband's as "direct, vigorous, gay."

== Death ==
In her final three years, Aline Kilmer suffered from an excruciating illness, lung cancer. She died at her home, "Whitehall", in Stillwater, New Jersey, on October 1, 1941, aged 52, and was interred at Saint Joseph's Catholic Cemetery in Newton, New Jersey.

Five lines from her poem, "Sanctuary", are inscribed on her gravestone:

There all bright passing beauty is held forever
Free from the sense of tears, to be loved without regret
There we shall find at their source music and love and laughter,
Colour and subtle fragrance and soft incredible textures:
Be sure we shall find what our weary hearts desire.

== Works ==
- 1919: Candles That Burn (poetry)
- 1921: Vigils (poetry)
- 1923: Hunting a Hair Shirt and Other Spiritual Adventures (essays) ISBN 0-8369-2697-8
- 1925: The Poor Kings Daughter and Other Verse (poetry)
- 1927: Emmy, Nicky and Greg (children's book)
- 1929: A Buttonwood Summer (children's book)
- 1929: Selected Poems (poetry)
- To Two Little Sisters of the Poor (date unknown)
