= List of places named after Joyce Kilmer =

This is a list of places which are located all around the world named or renamed in honor of American poet, writer and literary critic Joyce Kilmer (1886-1918).

== Places ==
=== In the United States ===
==== Illinois ====
- Kilmer Triangle in the Rogers Park section of Chicago, Illinois at the intersection of Birchwood, Rogers and Ashland Avenues.
- Joyce Kilmer Elementary School, Buffalo Grove, Illinois
- Joyce Kilmer Elementary School, Chicago, Illinois

==== Indiana ====
- Joyce Kilmer School 69, a former elementary school in Indianapolis, Indiana

==== Massachusetts ====
- Joyce Kilmer Road in West Roxbury (Boston), Massachusetts. This residential street ends near the Lower Joyce Kilmer School in West Roxbury.
- Sgt Joyce Alfred Kilmer Square in Boston, Massachusetts, at the north-eastern junction of Centre Street and Veterans of Foreign Wars Parkway (VFW Parkway), at the boundary of West Roxbury and Roslindale.
- Joyce Kilmer School in West Roxbury (Boston), Massachusetts. This K-8 school has two buildings ("Lower", K-3 and "Upper" 4–8) located less than 2 miles from each other.

==== Michigan ====
- Joyce Kilmer Road in Roscommon, Michigan. This road ends at a Branch of the very famous Au Sable River. Plenty of 'Trees' too!

==== Minnesota ====
- Joyce Kilmer Memorial Fireplace (built 1936) in Como Park in St. Paul, MN Kilmer was honored by St. Paul Parks Superintendent W. Lamont Kauffman, who was a charter member of the Joyce Kilmer post of the American Legion.

==== New Jersey ====
- In the early 20th century, the phone extension in New Brunswick, New Jersey, 545, was known as Kilmer.
- Camp Kilmer, a United States Army facility (1942-2009) that served as a training and embarkation center during World War II.
- Kilmer Processing Facility, a United States Postal Service distribution facility in Edison, New Jersey on the grounds of the former Camp Kilmer.
- Kilmer Library on the Livingston Campus of Rutgers, The State University of New Jersey (created out of part of the former Camp Kilmer). On February 8, 2017, the Board of Governors voted to name the library in honor of James Dickson Carr, Rutgers’ first African American graduate.
- The Joyce Kilmer Service Area along the New Jersey Turnpike in East Brunswick, New Jersey
- Joyce Kilmer Avenue (formerly Codwise Avenue), New Brunswick, New Jersey
- Joyce Kilmer Park, New Brunswick, New Jersey
- Joyce Kilmer Middle School, Trenton, New Jersey
- Joyce Kilmer Elementary School, a 4th-5th grade school in Mahwah, New Jersey

==== New York ====
- Joyce Kilmer Park in the Bronx (New York City) (along Grand Concourse in The Bronx, near Yankee Stadium)
- Sergeant Joyce Kilmer Triangle, located in Brooklyn (New York City), (along Kings Highway and Quentin Road at East 12th Street)

==== North Carolina ====
- Joyce Kilmer Memorial Forest (17,394 acres/15 km^{2}) located in the Nantahala National Forest, near Robbinsville in Graham County, North Carolina was dedicated in Kilmer's memory on July 10, 1936.

== Schools ==
- Joyce Kilmer Elementary School in Mahwah, New Jersey
- Joyce Kilmer Elementary School in Trenton, New Jersey
- Joyce Kilmer Elementary School, in Cherry Hill, New Jersey.
- Joyce Kilmer Middle School, in Milltown, New Jersey.
- Joyce Kilmer Middle School, in Fairfax County, Virginia.
- Joyce Kilmer Elementary School, in the Rogers Park section of Chicago, Illinois.
- Joyce Kilmer Elementary School, opened in 1966, in Buffalo Grove, Illinois is part of Community Consolidated School District No. 21 (Wheeling Township, Illinois)
- Joyce Kilmer School, in West Roxbury, Massachusetts (formerly Joyce Kilmer Elementary School) is named in his honor.

== Miscellaneous ==
- The Philolexian Society of Columbia University, a collegiate literary society of which Kilmer was vice president, holds the annual Alfred Joyce Kilmer Memorial Bad Poetry Contest in his honor.
- Nobody's Inn, a bar and grill at 150 Franklin Turnpike in Mahwah (next to the Erie-Lackawanna railroad tracks about 0.7 miles from the border of Suffern, New York), which closed in 2002, was widely believed to occupy the house that inspired Kilmer's poem, "The House with Nobody In It." The poem begins, "Whenever I walk to Suffern along the Erie track / I go by a poor old farmhouse with its shingles broken and black."
- The Joyce Kilmer Memorial Tree, located in New York City's Central Park near Center Drive and 67th Street.
