= Rouge Bouquet =

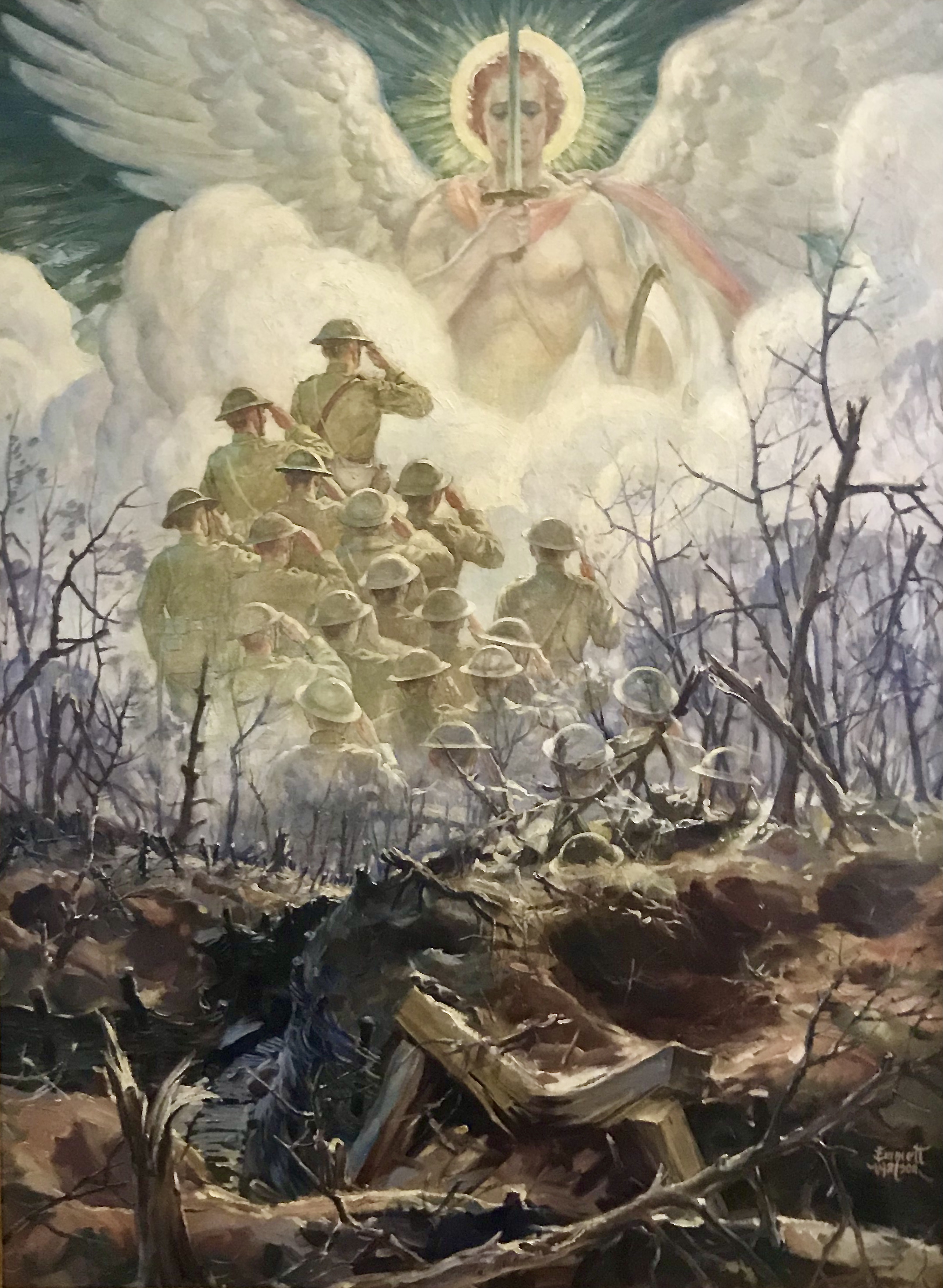
"Rouge Bouquet" by Emmett Watson.

Rouge Bouquet is a part of the Forêt de Parroy near the village of Baccarat, France. It was the site of a German artillery bombardment of American trench positions on 7 March 1918 at 15:20 on the Chausailles sector of the Western Front during World War I. The bombardment resulted in the burial of 21 men of the 165th Infantry Regiment (originally the 69th Regiment of the New York National Guard), 42nd Rainbow Division of whom only a few survived. The 22 men, including their platoon commander 1st Lieutenant John Norman, were assembled in a dugout when a German artillery shell landed on the roof of the dugout. Major William J. "Wild Bill" Donovan quickly began a rescue attempt to dig the men out, but the effort were hampered by mud-slides and continued enemy shelling. Two men were rescued and five dead were recovered before efforts had to be halted. The voices of other men could be heard for a while, but the remaining fifteen men died before rescue efforts could resume. Donovan was awarded the French Croix de Guerre for his actions during the attempted rescue.

Poet and literary critic Joyce Kilmer, a corporal at that time, wrote the 1918 poem "Rouge Bouquet" (also called "The Wood Called Rouge Bouquet") as a eulogy to commemorate the soldiers in his regiment who died. The poem was first read by Chaplain Francis Duffy at "the funeral service held at the collapsed dugout, the tomb of the regiment's first men slain in battle" a few days later. It first appeared in print in the American servicemen's newspaper Stars and Stripes—published two weeks after Kilmer died in combat in the Second Battle of the Marne on 30 July 1918.
