= Joyce Kilmer Memorial Bad Poetry Contest =

Columbia University humorous contest

The Alfred Joyce Kilmer Memorial Bad Poetry Contest has been hosted annually by the Philolexian Society, a literary and debating group at Columbia University, since 1986, drawing crowds of 200–300 students and participants vying for the title of best of the worst. Columbia faculty members serve as judges. The event is usually held in November and is heralded by the appearance of "Bad Poetry in Motion" flyers around campus (satirizing the New York City Subway's "Poetry in Motion" series) featuring some of the best verses of the last 20 years, as well as door-to-door readings in the dorms, usually performed by prospective new members ("phreshlings").

The event is named for "bad" poet (and Philolexian alumnus) Joyce Kilmer. His most famous work, Trees, is read aloud by audience members at the contest's end. In 2012, the Columbia Daily Spectator listed the Kilmer Bad Poetry Contest #1 among its "Best Columbia Arts Traditions".

Stephen Blair, Class of 2011, won the contest three times, in 2008, 2012 and 2013; and Everett Patterson, Class of 2006, won in 2003 and 2005.

== See also ==
- Golden Raspberry Awards
- list of mocking awards
