= Joyce Kilmer Natural Area =

Natural area in Pennsylvania

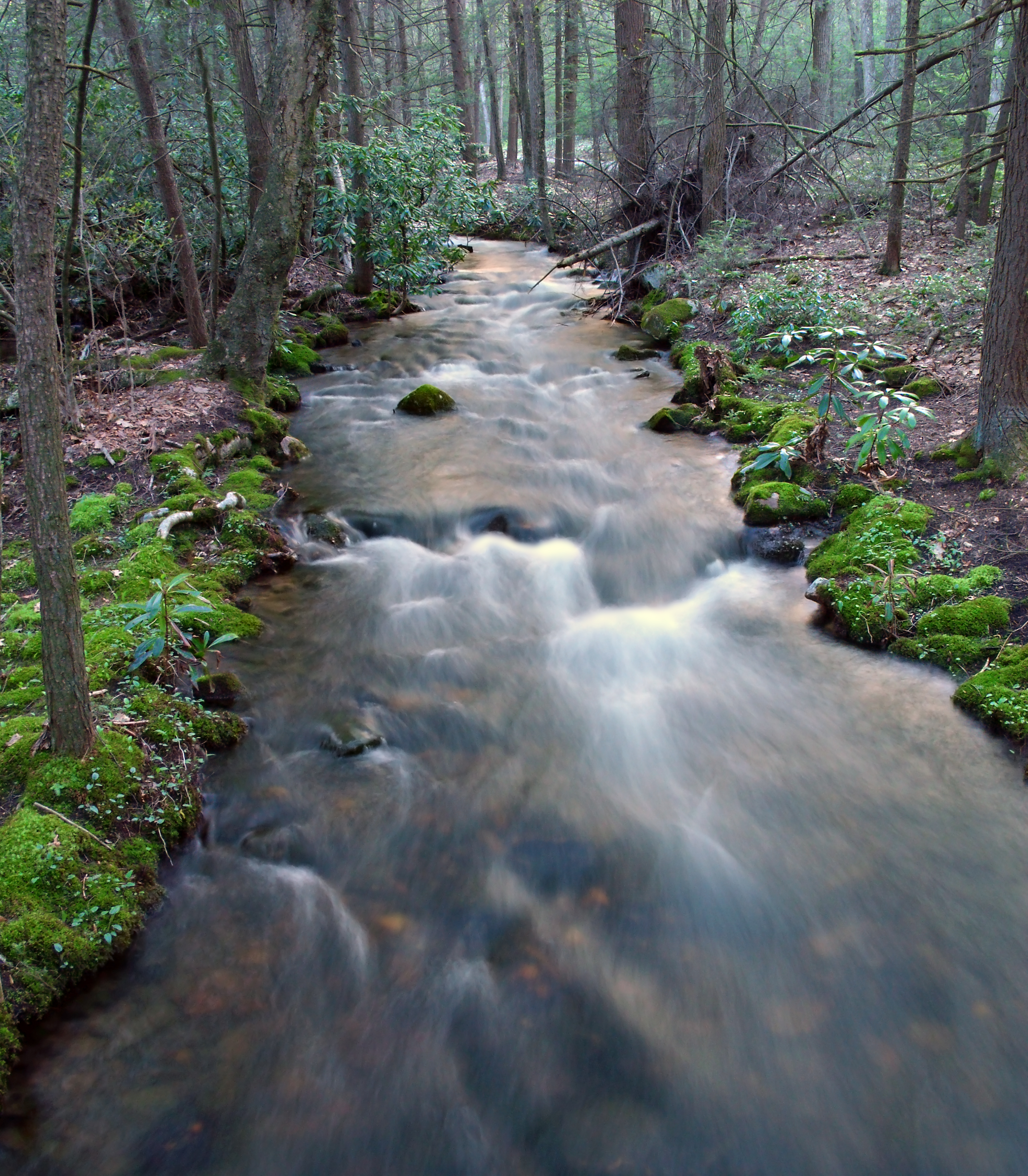
- Laurel Run in Joyce Kilmer Natural Area.

- Location within Pennsylvania
- Location: Union County, Pennsylvania
- Nearest town: Woodward
- Coordinates: 40°53′27″N 77°16′03″W
- Area: 77 acres (31 ha)
- Established: 1921
- Named for: Joyce Kilmer

Joyce Kilmer Natural Area is a 77-acre (31 ha) protected area in Union County, Pennsylvania, United States. It is part of Bald Eagle State Forest.

== Description ==
The Natural Area protects a grove of old-growth white pine and hemlock trees. The area was established in 1921 as one of the first protected forest zones in Pennsylvania, then known as Forest Monuments. It was named after poet Joyce Kilmer, who wrote about the types of trees found in the Natural Area; this was done in honor of Kilmer's death at age 31 during World War I though he is not known to have personally visited the region. The area has received special attention from Pennsylvania governor Josh Shapiro as part of his program to grow the Pennsylvania Outdoor Corps.
