= Rouge Bouquet (poem) =

WWI Poem by Joyce Kilmer

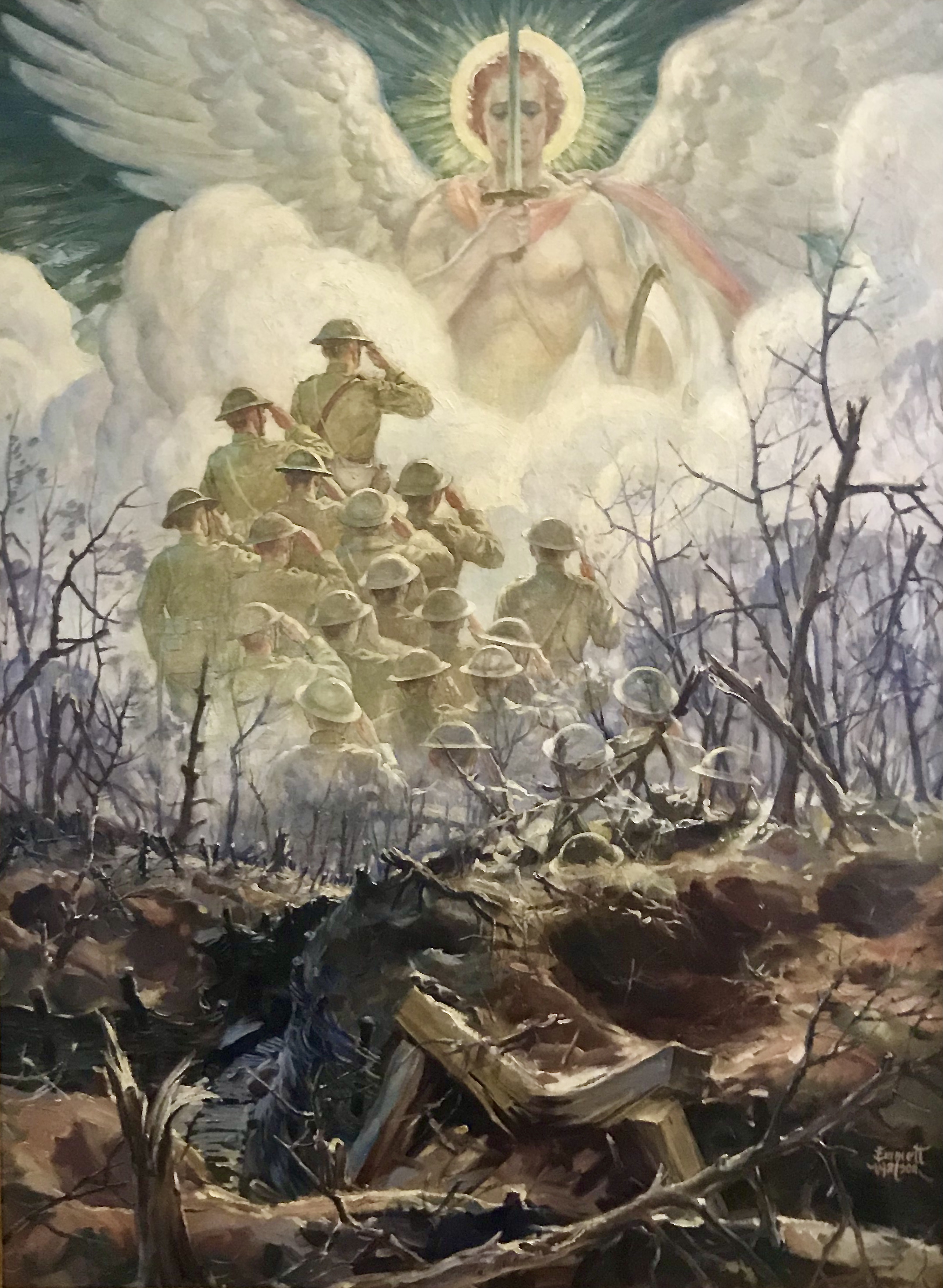
"Rouge Bouquet" by Emmett Watson, who served with Kilmer in France.

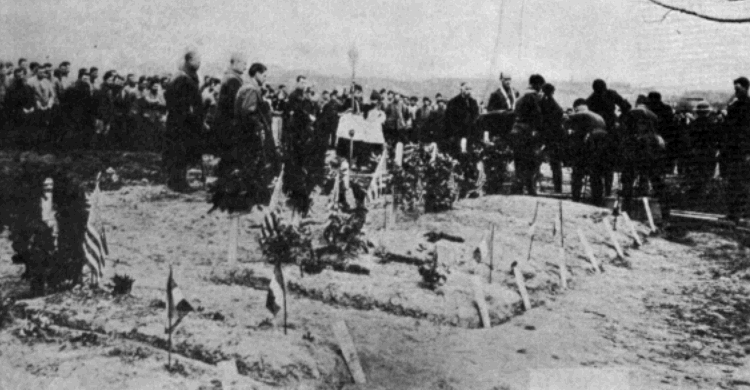
Memorial service held by soldiers of the "Fighting 69th" for 19 men lost in the 7 March 1918 Rouge Bouquet bombardment

"Rouge Bouquet" or "The Wood Called Rouge Bouquet" is a lyric poem written in 1918 by American poet, essayist, critic and soldier Joyce Kilmer (1886–1918). The poem commemorates an intense German artillery bombardment of an American trench position in the Rouge Bouquet wood near the French village of Baccarat on 7 March 1918 that resulted in the loss of 19 American soldiers with the 165th Infantry Regiment (better known as New York National Guard's, "The Fighting 69th Regiment"), of 42nd Rainbow Division.

Kilmer was a corporal at that time in the 165th Infantry Regiment, and he composed the poem immediately after the attack. It was first read a few days later as a eulogy by Chaplain Francis Duffy during "the funeral service held at the collapsed dugout, the tomb of the regiment's first men slain in battle". The poem was first published in the 16 August 1918 issue of "Stars and Stripes", two weeks after Kilmer's death in battle on 30 July 1918 during the Second Battle of the Marne. The poem was read over Kilmer's own grave when he was interred in France. To this day, it is a tradition of the Fighting 69th to read the poem at memorial services for fallen members of the regiment.

The reader will notice that at several points the words fall into the rhythm of "Taps".

== The poem ==
In a wood they call the Rouge Bouquet
There is a new-made grave today,
Built by never a spade nor pick,
Yet covered with earth ten meters thick.
There lie many fighting men,
Dead in their youthful prime,
Never to laugh nor love again
Or taste of the summer time;
For death came flying through the air
And stopped his flight at the dugout stair,
Touched his prey -
And left them there -
Clay to clay.
He hid their bodies stealthily
In the soil of the land they sought to free,
And fled away.
Now over the grave abrupt and clear
Three volleys ring;
And perhaps their brave young spirits hear
The bugle sing:
“Go to sleep!
Go to sleep!
Slumber well where the shell screamed and fell.
Let your rifles rest on the muddy floor,
You will not need them any more.
Danger’s past;
Now at last,
Go to sleep!”

There is on earth no worthier grave
To hold the bodies of the brave
Than this place of pain and pride
Where they nobly fought and nobly died.
Never fear but in the skies
Saints and angels stand
Smiling with their holy eyes
On this new-come band.
St. Michael’s sword darts through the air
And touches the aureole on his hair
As he sees them stand saluting there,
His stalwart sons;
And Patrick, Brigid, Columkill
Rejoice that in veins of warriors still
The Gael’s blood runs.
And up to Heaven’s doorway floats,
From the wood called Rouge Bouquet
A delicate cloud of bugle notes
That softly say:
“Farewell!
Farewell!
Comrades true, born anew, peace to you!
Your souls shall be where the heroes are
And your memory shine like the morning-star.
Brave and dear,
Shield us here.
Farewell!”
