= Robert C. Schnitzer =

American actor

Robert C. Schnitzer (September 8, 1906 in New York City, New York – January 2, 2008 in Stamford, Connecticut) was an American actor, producer, educator, and theater administrator. Schnitzer, a former Weston, Connecticut resident, was active in the Westport-Weston Arts Council and later the Westport Arts Center. He was also a longtime member of the board of directors of the Players Club.

Born in New York City, he attended Horace Mann School and Columbia College, later served on the faculties of Vassar, Smith, Columbia, and the University of Michigan, where he chaired the theater department. Schnitzer and his wife, actress Marcella Cisney, organized seminars and operated play readings during the 1980s. Cisney, who appeared in a number of films, including Hard, Fast and Beautiful, died in 1989.

While a young actor in New York City, Schnitzer appeared in or helped manage The Brothers Karamazov, Hamlet, An Enemy of the People, Richelieu, Henry V, Richard III, Caponsacchi, Macbeth, and Cyrano de Bergerac. From 1936 to 1939, Schnitzer was Delaware's State Director and deputy director of the WPA's Federal Theatre Project. In 1960, Mr. Schnitzer became the general manager for the American Repertory Company, set up by the Theatre Guild at the request of the U.S. Government to export the best in American theater. He arranged for three plays - The Skin of Our Teeth, The Miracle Worker, and The Glass Menagerie - to tour 28 countries in Europe and South America in 1961. The company included the famous actress Helen Hayes. During the 1970s he was head of the University of Michigan's Professional Theatre Program.

== Death ==
Schnitzer died on January 2, 2008, at a nursing home in Stamford, Connecticut, aged 101. At the time of his death, he was the oldest surviving member of the Philolexian Society of Columbia University.
