= Emmett Watson (illustrator) =

American artist & illustrator (1893–1955)

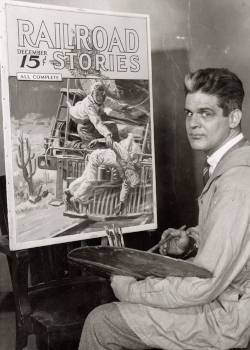
- Emmett Watson circa 1934
- Born: Emmett St. Clair Watson, Jr. January 30, 1893; Richmond, Virginia, United States
- Died: May 7, 1955 (aged 62); New Canaan, Connecticut, United States
- Education: Art Students League; Grand Central School of Art
- Known for: Illustration, painting

Emmett St. Clair Watson, Jr. (January 30, 1893 – May 7, 1955) was an American illustrator whose works appeared in popular magazines such as The Saturday Evening Post, Judge, Collier's, and Life, and also in pulp magazines such as Argosy, Railroad Stories, and Detective Fiction Weekly.

== Early life ==
Emmett St. Clair Watson, Jr. was born in 1893 in Richmond, Virginia to Emmett St. Clair Watson, Sr. and Julia Butler Winn, and spent his early childhood in the Church Hill section of the city. He attended John Marshall High School and worked as an illustrator for Metropolitan Engraving. In 1916, Watson moved to New York City, where he attended classes at the Art Students League and the Grand Central School of Art.

== World War I ==
When the United States entered World War I in 1917, Watson enlisted in the 7th Regiment of the New York Militia, also known as the "Silk Stocking" regiment, but was soon transferred to the Intelligence Section of Headquarters Company of 69th Infantry Regiment, the famous "Fighting Sixty-Ninth", within the 42nd Infantry "Rainbow" Division. In France, Watson worked as a cartographer, drawing maps of the front lines. He served with noted poet Joyce Kilmer, Father Duffy, and William "Wild Bill" Donovan.

== Freelance Illustrator ==
With the Armistice, the war was over and Watson returned to New York, opening his own art studio on East 34th Street in Manhattan. Many of his early published works were black and white illustrations and advertisements. Soon, however, he was creating color covers for slick magazines such as Judge, Collier's, and Life Magazine.

During the Great Depression, many of Watson's works appeared in pulp magazines, such as Argosy, Detective Fiction Weekly, and Railroad Stories. David Saunders has described Watson's work for the pulps as "masterful" and wrote that his "...confident drawing style, bold compositions, and joyous color schemes were very influential, especially for the younger pulp artist, Rudolph Belarski, who worked with Watson for Argosy."

After the depression, once again Watson's work appeared in slick magazines, such as The Saturday Evening Post, and during World War II Watson created several wartime posters as well as covers for Liberty Magazine.

His art includes covers for Adventure, American Legion Weekly, Argosy, Big Chief Western, Capper’s Farmer, Colliers, Detective Dime Novels, Detective Fiction Weekly, Double Detective, Everybody's, Farmer's Wife, Good Hardware, Judge, Leslie's, Liberty, Life, National Home Monthly, Parents’ Magazine, People's Popular Monthly, Phantom Detective, Progressive Grocer, Railroad Stories, Red Star Detective, Saturday Evening Post, Star Western, Thrilling Adventures, and Toronto Star Weekly. In addition, he drew magazine interior art and advertisements; hunting, fishing, and camping scenes for calendars for Brown & Bigelow; and illustrations for book jackets.

== Personal life ==
Watson married Marguerite Marie Elliott in the Church of the Transfiguration in Manhattan on July 18, 1921. Their son Emmett St. Clair Watson III was born in 1922 and daughter Marguerite in 1925. The Watsons lived for many years in Scarsdale, New York.

== Death ==
Emmett Watson died on May 7, 1955.

== Gallery ==
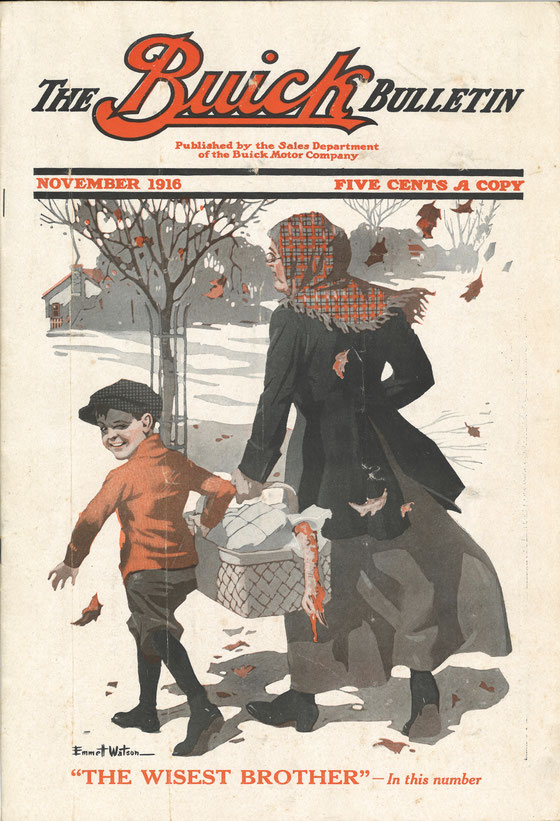
Buick Bulletin
Nov 1916

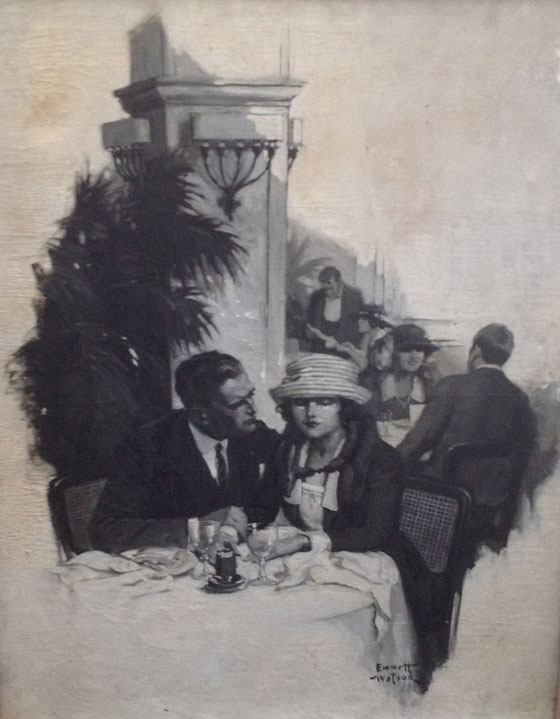
Man and Woman
circa 1919

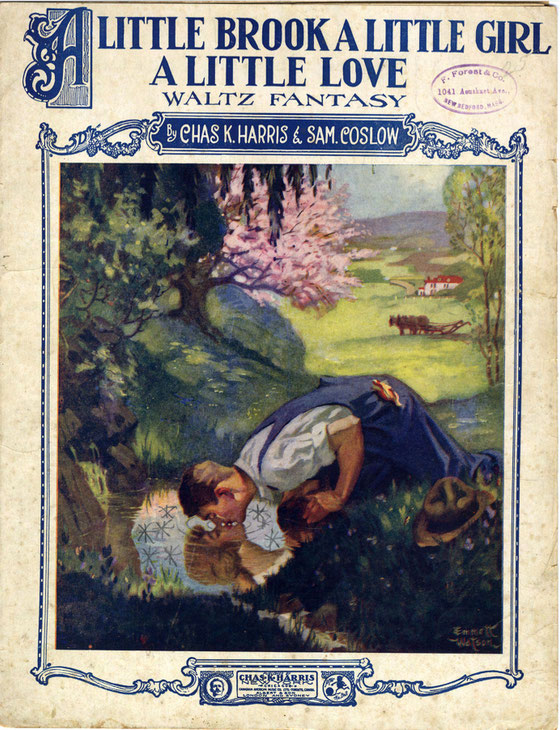
Sheet music cover
circa 1920

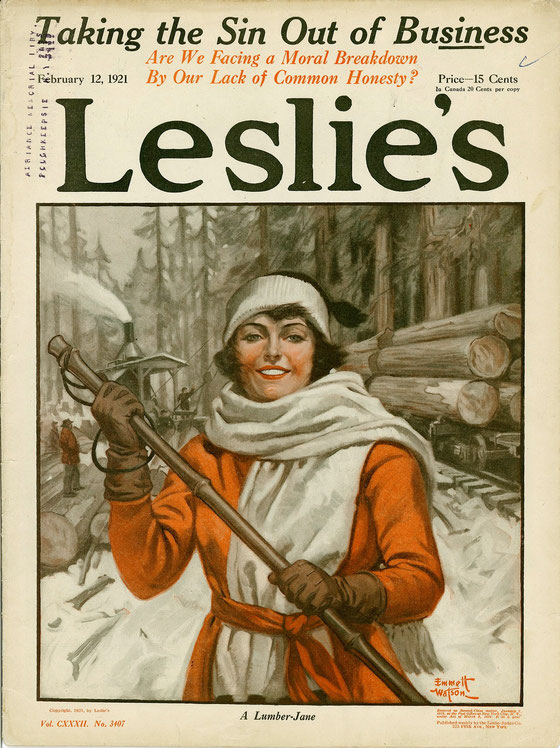
Leslie's Magazine
Feb 12, 1921

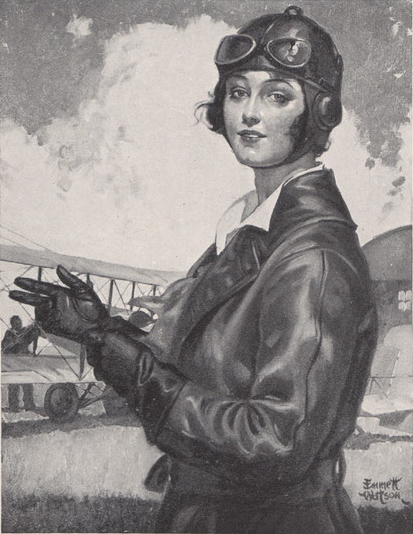
Female Aviator
circa 1924

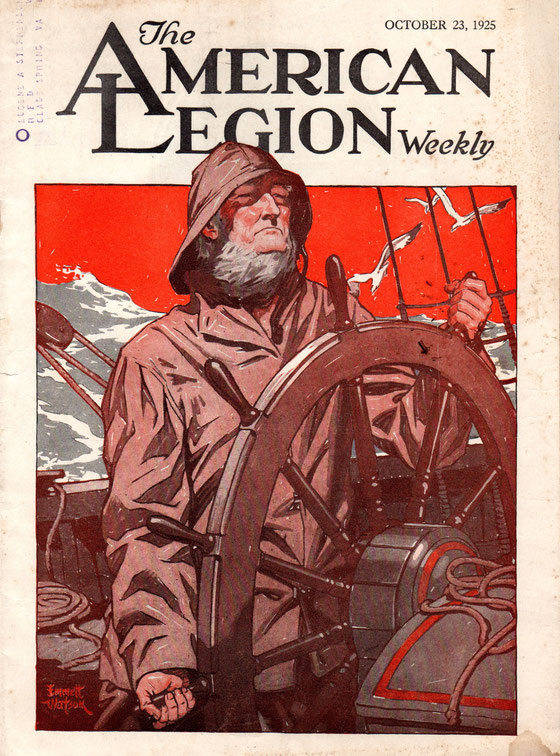
American Legion Weekly
Oct 23, 1925

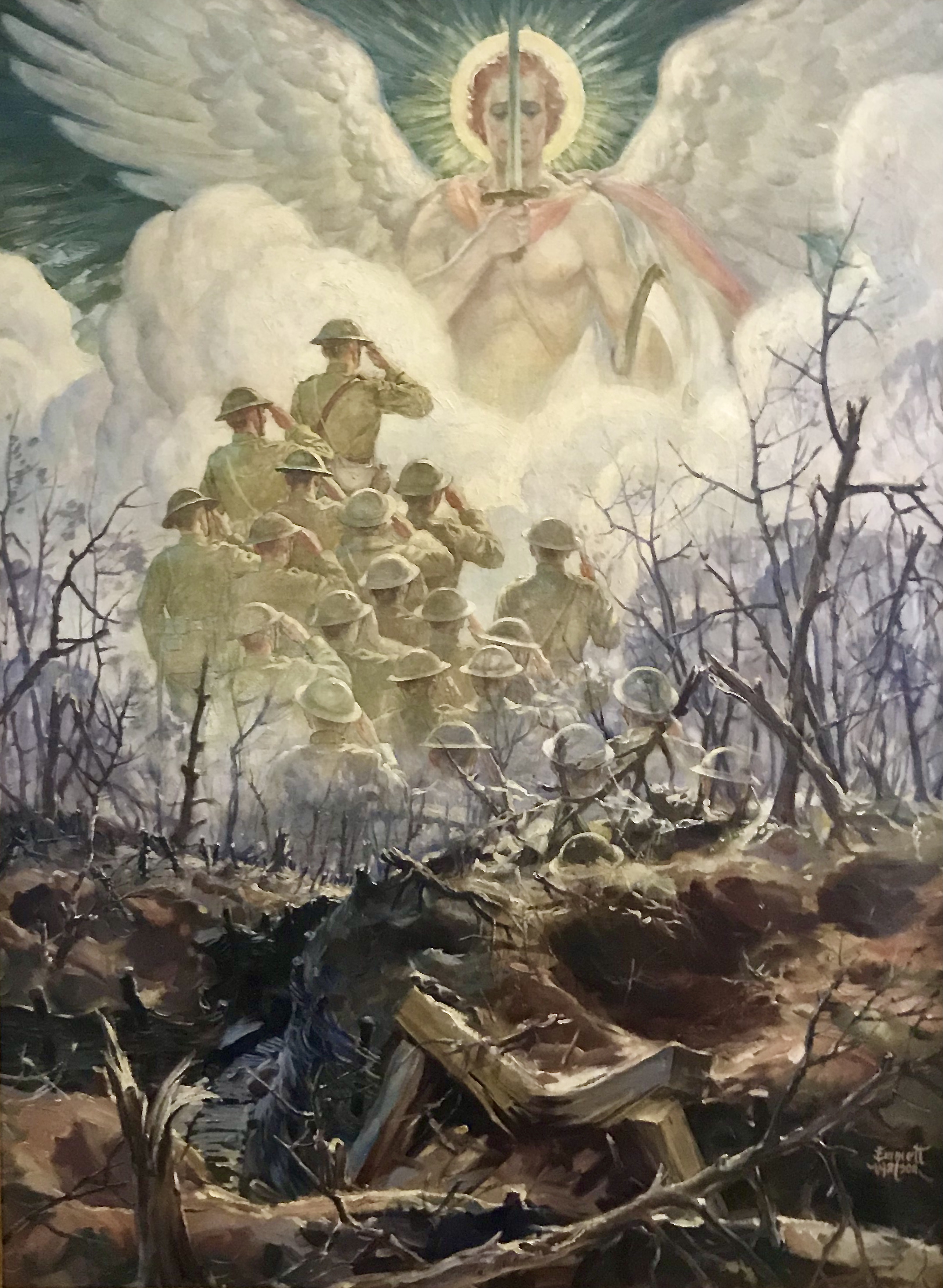
Rouge Bouquet

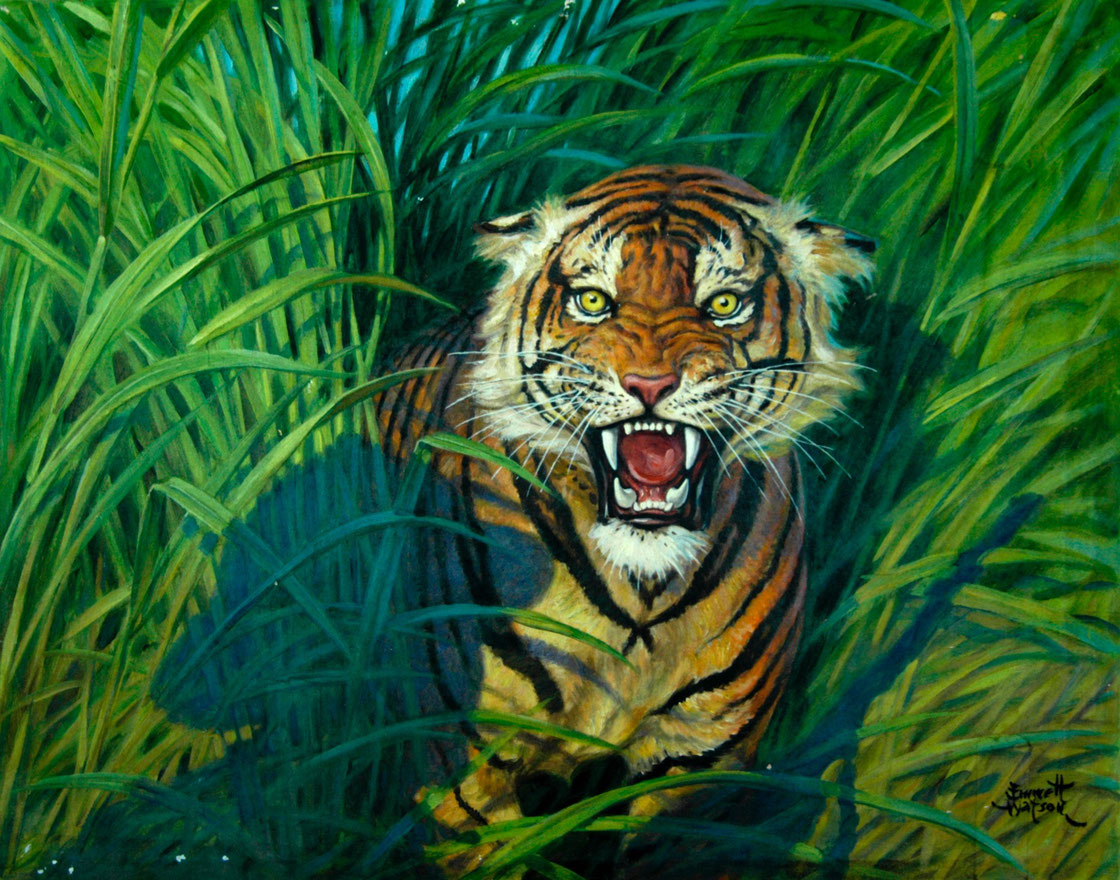
Tiger in hunter's shadow

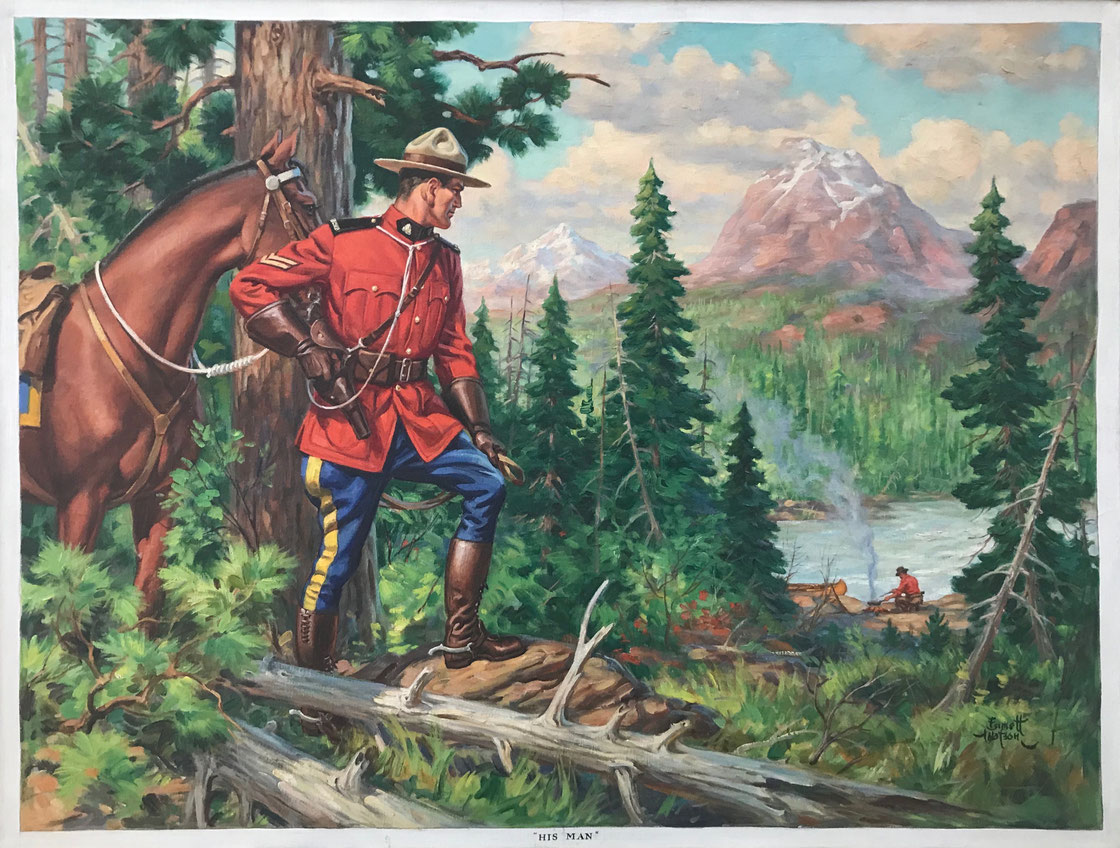
His Man

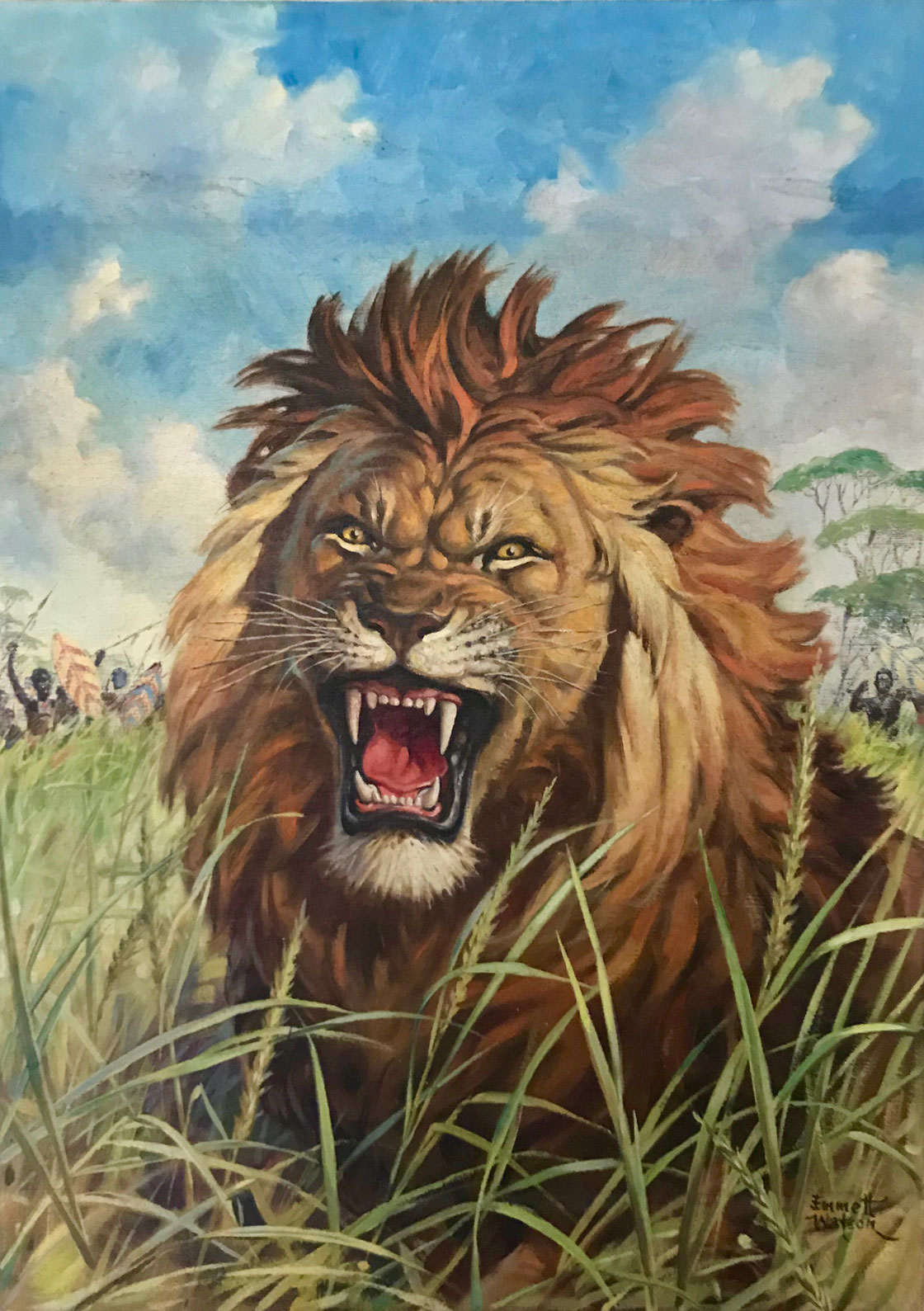
Lion

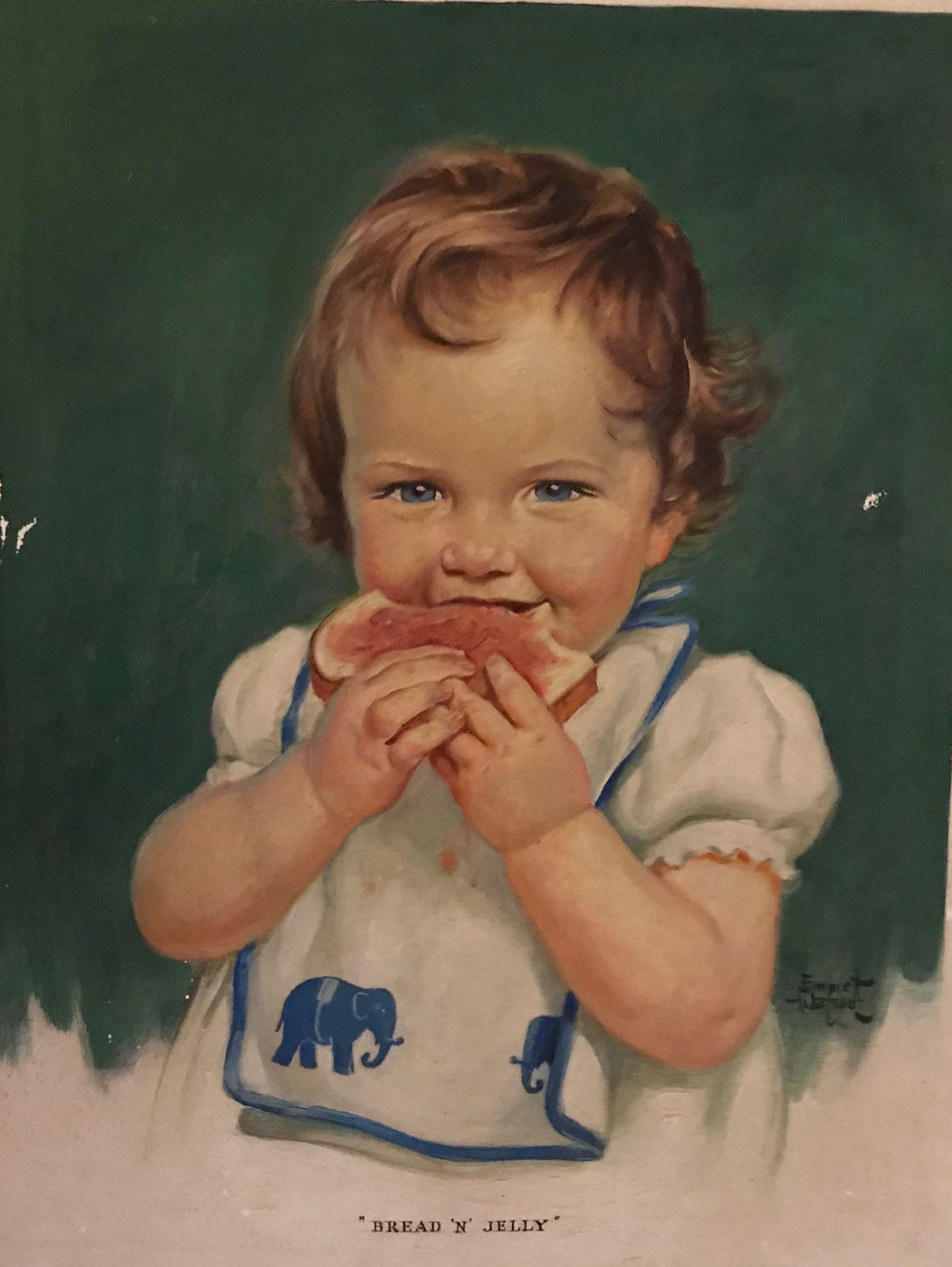
Bread 'n' Jelly

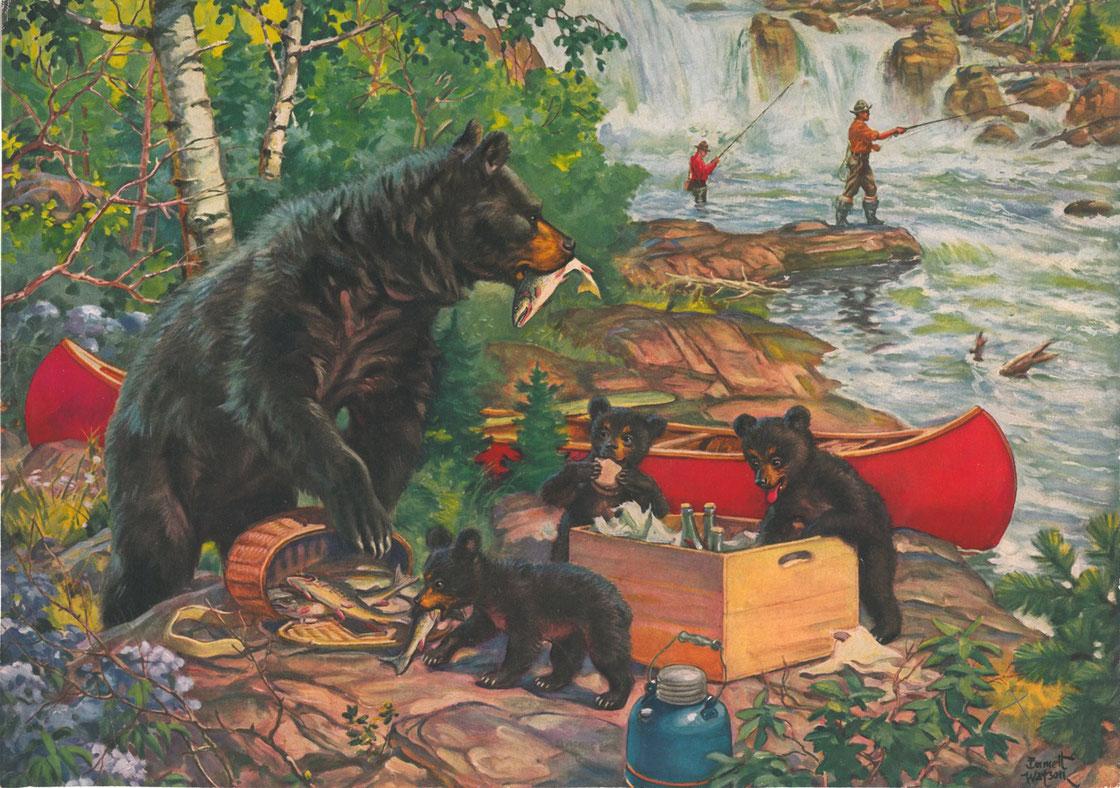
Finders Keepers
