= Joyce Kilmer =

American poet, editor, literary critic, soldier (1886–1918)

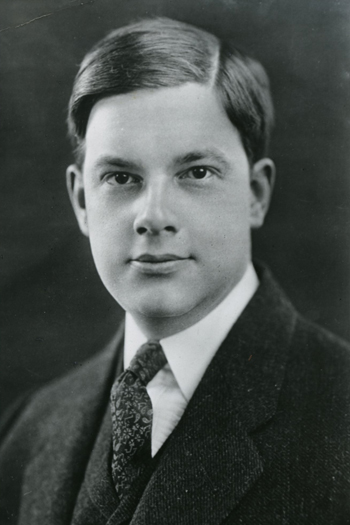
- Kilmer's Columbia University yearbook photograph, c. 1908
- Born: Alfred Joyce Kilmer; December 6, 1886; New Brunswick, New Jersey, U.S.
- Died: July 30, 1918 (aged 31) near Seringes-et-Nesles, Aisne, France
- Cause of death: Killed in action
- Resting place: Oise-Aisne American Cemetery, France
- Education: Columbia University (A.B. 1908); Rutgers College
- Occupations: Poet, journalist, editor, lecturer, soldier
- Spouse: Aline Murray (1908–1918, his deatth
- Writing career
- Period: 1909–1918
- Genres: Poetry, literary criticism, essays, Catholic theology
- Notable works: Trees and Other Poems (1914), Main Street and Other Poems (1917)

Alfred Joyce Kilmer (December 6, 1886 – July 30, 1918) was an American writer and poet mainly remembered for a short poem titled "Trees" (1913), which was published in the collection Trees and Other Poems in 1914. Though a prolific poet whose works celebrated the common beauty of the natural world as well as his Catholic faith, Kilmer was also a journalist, literary critic, lecturer, and editor. At the time of his deployment to Europe during World War I, Kilmer was considered the leading American Catholic poet and lecturer of his generation, whom critics often compared to British contemporaries G. K. Chesterton (1874–1936) and Hilaire Belloc (1870–1953). He enlisted in the New York National Guard and was deployed to France with the 69th Infantry Regiment (the "Fighting 69th") in 1917. He was killed by a sniper's bullet at the Second Battle of the Marne in 1918 at the age of 31. He was married to Aline Murray, also an accomplished poet and author, with whom he had five children.

While most of his works are largely unknown today, a select few of his poems remain popular and are published frequently in anthologies. Several critics—including both Kilmer's contemporaries and modern scholars—have dismissed Kilmer's work as being too simple and overly sentimental, and suggested that his style was far too traditional, even archaic. Many writers, including notably Ogden Nash, have parodied Kilmer's work and style—as attested by the many imitations of "Trees."

== Biography ==
=== Early years and education: 1886–1908 ===
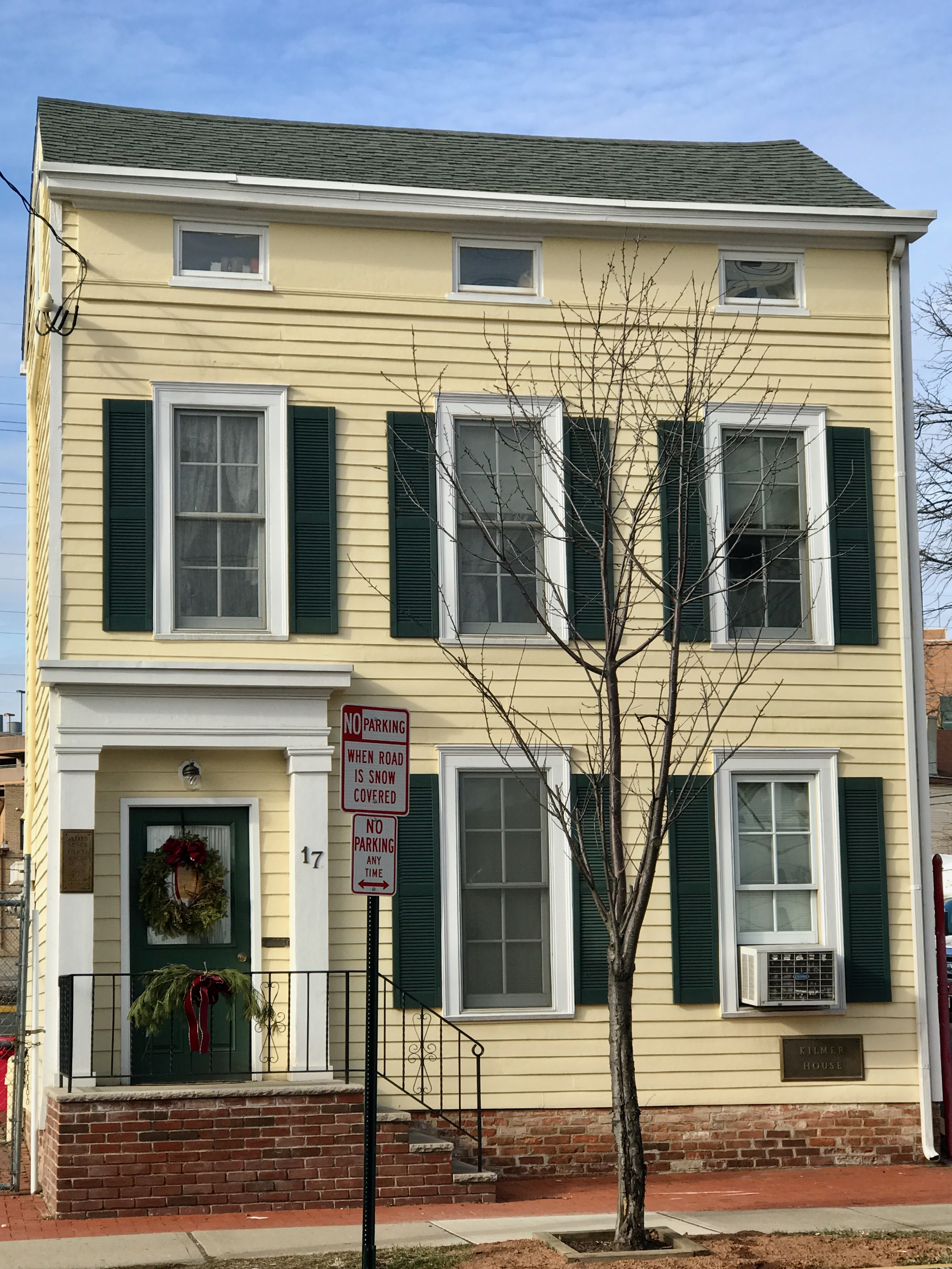
Birthplace at 17 Joyce Kilmer Avenue, New Brunswick

Kilmer was born December 6, 1886, in New Brunswick, New Jersey, the fourth and youngest child, (Note: Per Miriam A. Kilmer's website (located here. Retrieved August 14, 2012), Joyce was the fourth and youngest; however, two of his siblings, sister Ellen Annie Kilmer (1875–1876) and brother Charles Willoughby Kilmer (1880–1880), died before his birth. Kilmer's older, surviving brother, Anda Frederick Kilmer (1873–1899), died when Joyce was thirteen years old—most likely a suicide—in a Philadelphia hotel.) of Annie Ellen Kilburn, a minor writer and composer, and Frederick Barnett Kilmer, a physician and analytical chemist employed by the Johnson and Johnson Company and inventor of the company's baby powder. He was named Alfred Joyce Kilmer after two priests at Christ Church in New Brunswick: Alfred R. Taylor, the curate; and Elisha Brooks Joyce, the rector. Christ Church is the oldest Episcopal parish in New Brunswick and the Kilmer family were parishioners. Rector Joyce, who served the parish from 1883 to 1916, baptised the young Kilmer, who remained an Episcopalian until his 1913 conversion to Catholicism. Kilmer's birthplace in New Brunswick, where the Kilmer family lived from 1886 to 1892, is still standing and houses a small museum to Kilmer, as well as a few Middlesex County government offices.

Kilmer entered Rutgers College Grammar School (now Rutgers Preparatory School) in 1895 at the age of 8. During his years at the Grammar School, Kilmer was editor-in-chief of the school's paper, the Argo, and loved the classics but had difficulty with Greek. He won the first Lane Classical Prize, for oratory, and obtained a scholarship to Rutgers College which he would attend the following year. Despite his difficulties with Greek and mathematics, he stood at the head of his class in preparatory school.

After graduating from Rutgers College Grammar School in 1904, he continued his education at Rutgers College (now Rutgers University-New Brunswick) from 1904 to 1906. At Rutgers, Kilmer was associate editor of the Targum, the campus newspaper, and a member of the Delta Upsilon fraternity. However, he was unable to complete the curriculum's rigorous mathematics requirement and was asked to repeat his second year. Under pressure from his mother, Kilmer transferred to Columbia University in New York City.

At Columbia, Kilmer was vice-president of the Philolexian Society (a literary society), associate editor of Columbia Spectator (the campus newspaper), and member of the Debating Union. He completed his Bachelor of Arts (A.B.) degree and graduated from Columbia on May 23, 1908. Shortly after graduation, on June 9, 1908, he married Aline Murray (1888–1941), a fellow poet to whom he had been engaged since his second year at Rutgers. The Kilmers had five children: Kenton Sinclair Kilmer (1909–1995); Rose Kilburn Kilmer (1912–1917); Deborah Clanton Kilmer (1914–1999), who became a nun ("Sister Michael") at the Saint Benedict Monastery, St. Joseph, Minnesota; Michael Barry Kilmer (1916–1927); and Christopher Kilmer (1917–1984).

=== Years of writing and faith: 1909–1917 ===
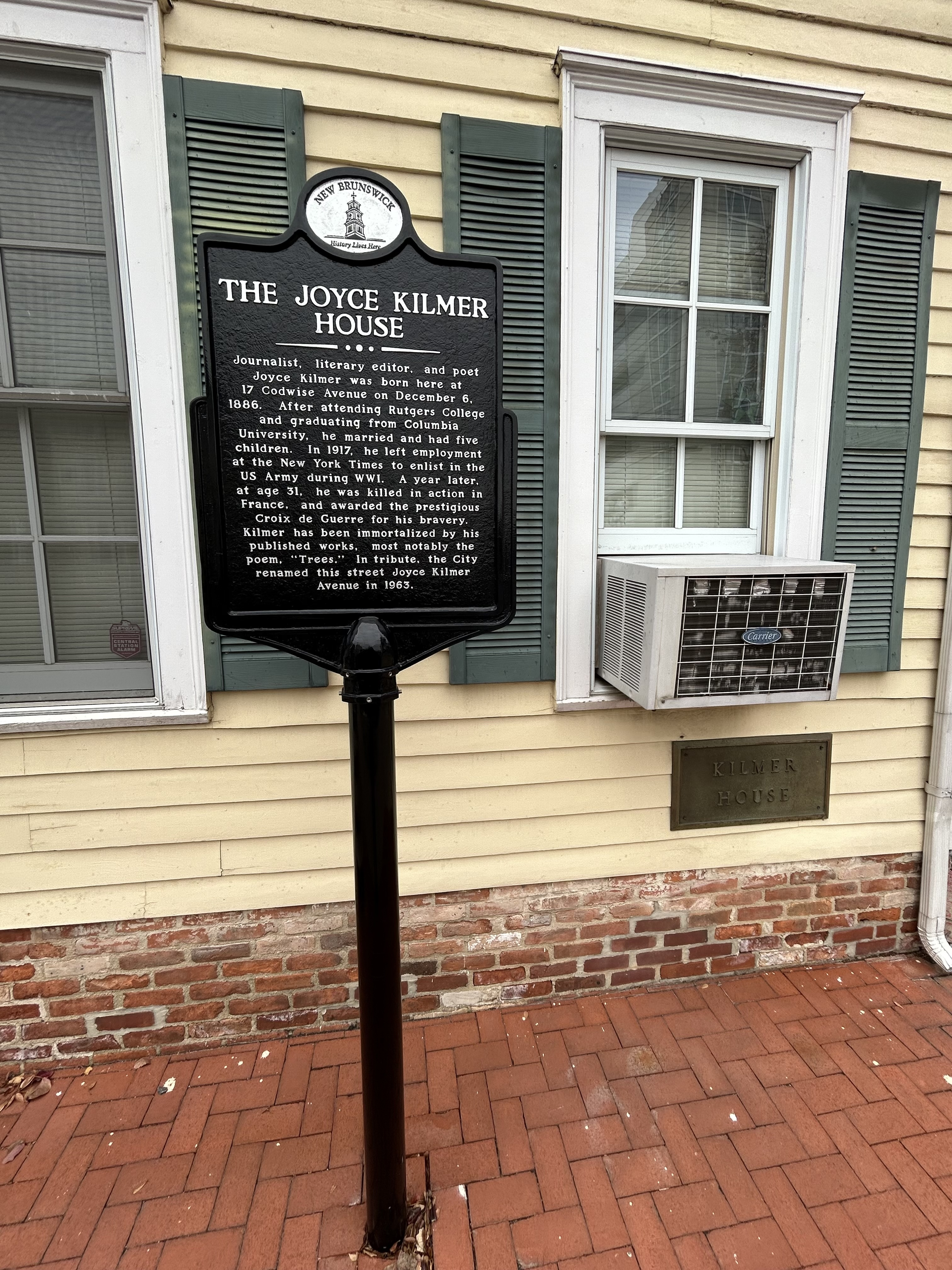
Kilmer House, New Brunswick, NJ

In the autumn of 1908, Kilmer was employed teaching Latin at Morristown High School in Morristown, New Jersey. At this time, he began to submit essays to Red Cross Notes (including his first published piece, an essay on the "Psychology of Advertising") and his early poems to literary periodicals. Kilmer also wrote book reviews for The Literary Digest, Town & Country, The Nation, and The New York Times. By June 1909, Kilmer had abandoned any aspirations to continue teaching and relocated to New York City, where he focused solely on developing a career as a writer.

From 1909 to 1912 Kilmer was employed by Funk and Wagnalls, which was preparing an edition of The Standard Dictionary that would be published in 1912. According to Hillis, Kilmer's job "was to define ordinary words assigned to him at five cents for each word defined. This was a job at which one would ordinarily earn ten to twelve dollars a week, but Kilmer attacked the task with such vigor and speed that it was soon thought wisest to put him on a regular salary."

In 1911 Kilmer's first book of verse was published, entitled Summer of Love. Kilmer later wrote, "some of the poems in it, those inspired by genuine love, are not things of which to be ashamed, and you, understanding, would not be offended by the others."

In 1912 Kilmer became a special writer for the New York Times Review of Books and the New York Times Sunday Magazine and was often engaged in lecturing. He moved to Mahwah, New Jersey, where he resided until his service and death in World War I. By this time he had become established as a published poet and as a popular lecturer. According to Robert Holliday, Kilmer "frequently neglected to make any preparation for his speeches, not even choosing a subject until the beginning of the dinner which was to culminate in a specimen of his oratory. His constant research for the dictionary, and, later on, for his New York Times articles, must have given him a store of knowledge at his fingertips to be produced at a moment's notice for these emergencies."

When the Kilmers' daughter Rose (1912–1917) was stricken with poliomyelitis (also known as infantile paralysis) shortly after birth, they turned to their religious faith for comfort. A series of correspondence between Kilmer and Fr. James J. Daly led the Kilmers to convert to Catholicism, and they were received in the church in 1913. In one of these letters, Kilmer writes that he "believed in the Catholic position, the Catholic view of ethics and aesthetics, for a long time," and he "wanted something not intellectual, some conviction not mental – in fact I wanted Faith." Kilmer would stop "every morning for months" on his way "to the office and prayed for faith," claiming that when "faith did come, it came, I think, by way of my little paralyzed daughter. Her lifeless hands led me; I think her tiny feet know beautiful paths. You understand this and it gives me a selfish pleasure to write it down."

With the publication of "Trees" in the magazine Poetry in August 1913, Kilmer gained immense popularity as a poet across the United States. He had established himself as a successful lecturer—particularly one seeking to reach a Catholic audience. His close friend and editor Robert Holliday wrote that it "is not an unsupported assertion to say that he was in his time and place the laureate of the Catholic Church." Trees and Other Poems (1914) was published the following year. This collection also introduced the popular poem "The House With Nobody In It". Over the next few years, Kilmer was prolific in his output, managing an intense schedule of lectures, publishing a large number of essays and literary criticism, and writing poetry. In 1915 he became poetry editor of Current Literature and contributing editor of Warner's Library of the World's Best Literature. In 1916 and 1917, before the American entry into World War I, Kilmer would publish four books: The Circus and Other Essays (1916), a series of interviews with literary personages entitled Literature in the Making (1917), Main Street and Other Poems (1917), and Dreams and Images: An Anthology of Catholic Poets (1917). In the aftermath of the 1916 Easter Rising in Ireland, Kilmer helped organize a large memorial service in New Yorks Central Park for those who died in that conflict.

=== War years: 1917–1918 ===
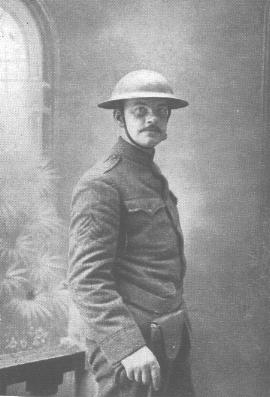
Sgt. Joyce Kilmer, as a member of the 165th Infantry Regiment, United States Army, c. 1918

In April 1917, a few days after the United States entered World War I, Kilmer enlisted in the Seventh Regiment of the New York National Guard. In August, Kilmer was assigned as a statistician with the 165th Infantry Regiment (better known as the re-designated "Fighting 69th", the 69th New York Infantry Regiment), of the 42nd "Rainbow" Division, and quickly rose to the rank of sergeant. Though he was eligible for commission as an officer and often recommended for such posts during the course of the war, Kilmer refused, stating that he would rather be a sergeant in the Fighting 69th than an officer in any other regiment.

Shortly before his deployment to Europe, the Kilmers' daughter Rose died, and twelve days later their son Christopher was born. Before his departure, Kilmer had contracted with publishers to write a book about the war, deciding upon the title Here and There with the Fighting Sixty-Ninth. The regiment arrived in France in November 1917, and Kilmer wrote to his wife that he had not written "anything in prose or verse since I got here—except statistics—but I've stored up a lot of memories to turn into copy when I get a chance." Kilmer did not write such a book; however, toward the end of the year, he did find time to write prose sketches and poetry. The most notable of his poems during this period was "Rouge Bouquet" (1918) which commemorated the deaths of two dozen members of his regiment in a German artillery barrage on American trench positions in the Rouge Bouquet forest north-east of the French village of Baccarat. At the time, this was a relatively quiet sector of the front, but the first battalion was struck by a German heavy artillery bombardment on the afternoon of March 7, 1918, that buried 21 men of the unit, killing 19 (of which 14 remained entombed).

Kilmer sought more hazardous duty and was transferred to the military intelligence section of his regiment, in April 1918. In a letter to his wife, Aline, he remarked: "Now I'm doing work I love – and work you may be proud of. None of the drudgery of soldiering, but a double share of glory and thrills." According to Hillis, Kilmer's fellow soldiers had accorded him much respect for his battlefield demeanour—"He was worshipped by the men about him. I have heard them speak with awe of his coolness and his nerve in scouting patrols in no man's land. This coolness and his habit of choosing, with typical enthusiasm, the most dangerous and difficult missions, led to his death."

=== Death and burial ===
During the Second Battle of Marne there was heavy fighting throughout the last days of July 1918. On July 30, 1918, Kilmer volunteered to accompany Major "Wild Bill" Donovan (later, in World War II, the founder of the Office of Strategic Services, forerunner to the Central Intelligence Agency) when Donovan's battalion (1–165th Infantry) was sent to lead the day's attack.

During the course of the day, Kilmer led a scouting party to find the position of a German machine gun. When his comrades found him, some time later, they thought at first that he was peering over the edge of a little hill, where he had crawled for a better view. When he did not answer their call, they ran to him and found him dead. According to Father Francis P. Duffy: "A bullet had pierced his brain. His body was carried in and buried by the side of Ames. God rest his dear and gallant soul." A sniper's bullet likely killed him instantly. According to military records, Kilmer died on the battlefield near Meurcy Farm, beside the Ourcq River near the village of Seringes-et-Nesles, in France, on July 30, 1918, at the age of 31. For his valor, Kilmer was posthumously awarded the Croix de Guerre (War Cross) by the French Republic.

Kilmer was buried in the Oise-Aisne American Cemetery and Memorial, near Fere-en-Tardenois, Aisne, Picardy, France just across the road and stream from the farm where he was killed. A cenotaph erected to his memory is located on the Kilmer family plot in Elmwood Cemetery, in North Brunswick, New Jersey. A Memorial Mass was celebrated at St. Patrick's Cathedral in New York City on October 14, 1918.

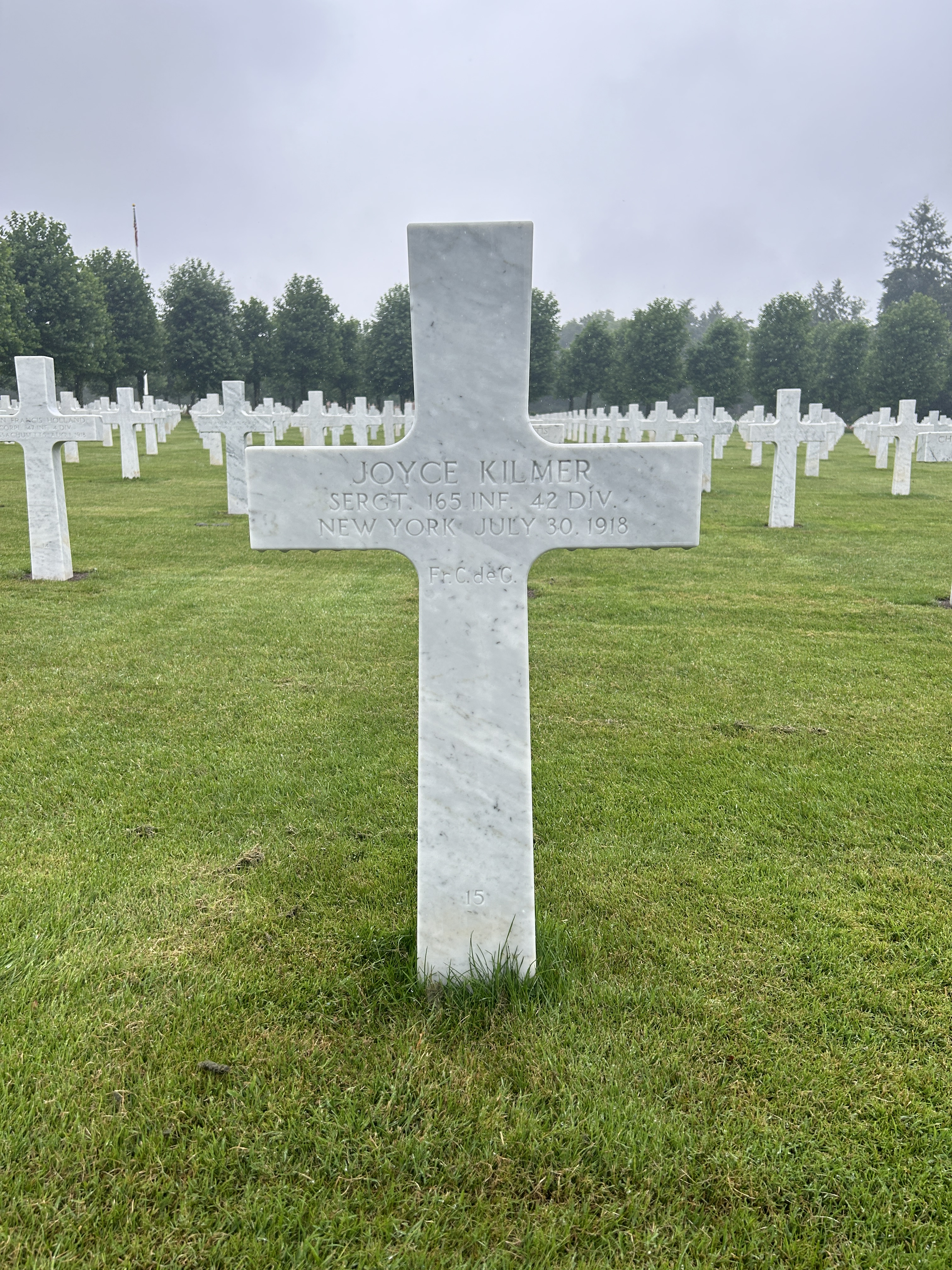
Grave of Sergeant Joyce Kilmer, Oise-Aisne Cemetery, France

== Works ==
=== "Trees" ===
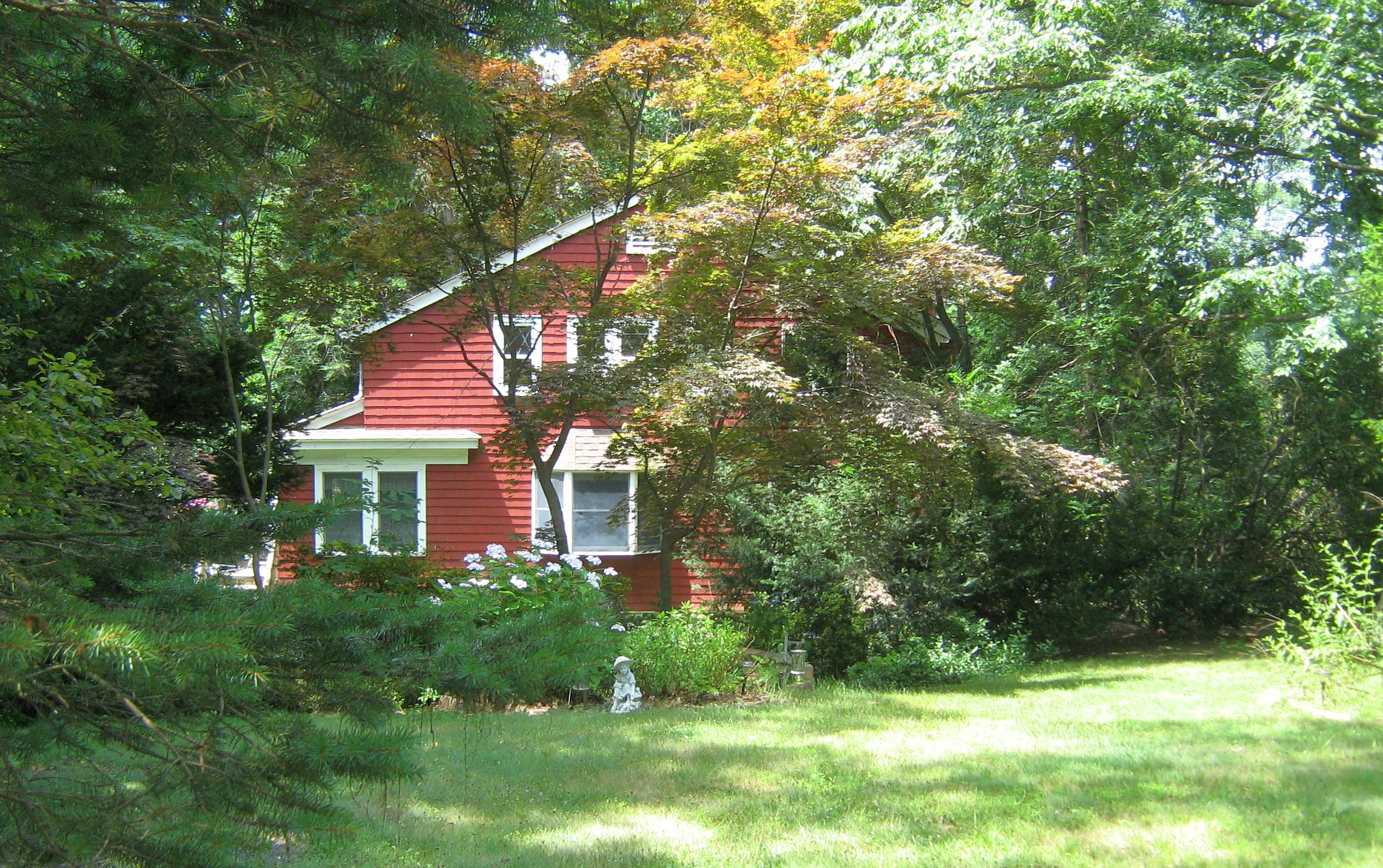
The Kilmer family lived in this home on Airmount Road in Mahwah, New Jersey. It was here that his poem "Trees" was written in February 1913.

Joyce Kilmer's reputation as a poet is staked largely on the widespread popularity of one poem—"Trees" (1913). It was first published in the August 1913 issue of Poetry: A Magazine of Verse which had begun publishing the year before in Chicago, Illinois and was included as the title poem in a collection of poems Trees and Other Poems (1914). According to Kilmer's oldest son, Kenton, the poem was written on February 2, 1913, when the family resided in Mahwah, New Jersey.

It was written in the afternoon in the intervals of some other writing. The desk was in an upstairs room, by a window looking down a wooded hill. It was written in a little notebook in which his father and mother wrote out copies of several of their poems, and, in most cases, added the date of composition. On one page the first two lines of 'Trees' appear, with the date, February 2, 1913, and on another page, further on in the book, is the full text of the poem. It was dedicated to his wife's mother, Mrs. Henry Mills Alden, who was endeared to all her family.

Many locations including Rutgers University (where Kilmer attended for two years), University of Notre Dame, as well as historians in Mahwah, New Jersey and in other places, have boasted that a specific tree was the inspiration for Kilmer's poem. However, Kenton Kilmer refutes these claims, remarking that,

Mother and I agreed, when we talked about it, that Dad never meant his poem to apply to one particular tree, or to the trees of any special region. Just any trees or all trees that might be rained on or snowed on, and that would be suitable nesting places for robins. I guess they'd have to have upward-reaching branches, too, for the line about 'lifting leafy arms to pray.' Rule out weeping willows."

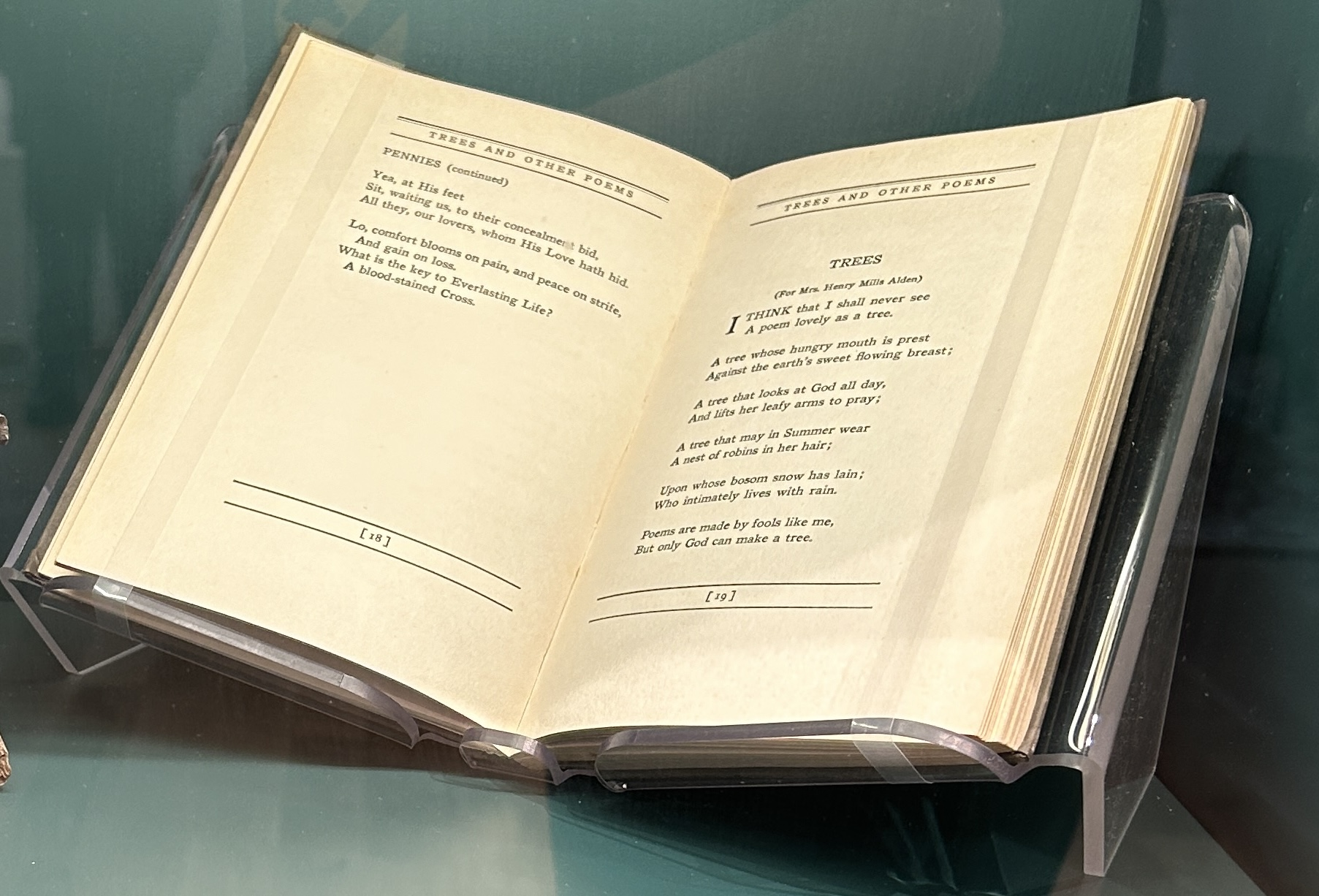
1914 first edition, Trees & Other Poems on display, Oise-Aisne Cemetery Visitors Center

The popular appeal of this simple poem is likely the source of its endurance despite the continuing negative opinion of the poem's merits from scholars and critics. According to Robert Holliday, Kilmer's friend and editor, "Trees" speaks "with authentic song to the simplest of hearts" and that "(t)he exquisite title poem now so universally known, made his reputation more than all the rest he had written put together. That impeccable lyric which made for immediate widespread popularity." Its popularity has also led to parodies of the poem—some by noted poets and writers. The pattern of its first lines (I think that I shall never see / A poem lovely as a tree.) is of seemingly simple rhyme and meter and easy to mimic along with the poem's choice of metaphors. One of the best known parodies is "Song of the Open Road" by American humorist and poet Ogden Nash (1902–1971):

I think that I shall never see
A billboard lovely as a tree.
Indeed, unless the billboards fall,
I'll never see a tree at all.

=== Influences upon Kilmer's verse ===
Kilmer's early works were inspired by, and were imitative of, the poetry of Algernon Charles Swinburne, Gerard Manley Hopkins, Ernest Dowson, Aubrey Beardsley, and William Butler Yeats (and the Celtic Revival). It was later through the influence of works by Coventry Patmore, Francis Thompson, and those of Alice Meynell and her children Viola Meynell and Francis Meynell, that Kilmer seems to have become interested in Catholicism. Kilmer wrote of his influences:

I have come to regard them with intense admiration. Patmore seems to me to be a greater poet than Francis Thompson. He has not the rich vocabulary, the decorative erudition, the Shelleyan enthusiasm, which distinguish the Sister Songs and the Hound of Heaven, but he has a classical simplicity, a restraint and sincerity which make his poems satisfying.

Because he was initially raised Episcopalian (or Anglican), Kilmer became literary editor of the Anglican weekly, The Churchman, before his conversion to Catholicism. During this time he did considerable research into 16th and 17th century Anglican poets as well as metaphysical, or mystic poets of that time, including George Herbert, Thomas Traherne, Robert Herrick, Bishop Coxe, and Robert Stephen Hawker (the eccentric vicar of the Church of Saint Morwenna and Saint John the Baptist at Morwenstow in Cornwall)—the latter whom he referred to as "a coast life-guard in a cassock." These poets also had an influence on Kilmer's writings.

Critics compared Kilmer to British Catholic writers Hilaire Belloc and G. K. Chesterton—suggesting that his reputation might have risen to the level where he would have been considered their American counterpart if not for his untimely death.

=== Legacy ===
Kilmer's death at age 31 denied him the opportunity to develop into a more mature poet. Because modern critics often dismiss "Trees" as simple verse, much of Kilmer's work (especially his literary criticism) has slipped into obscurity. Only a very few of his poems have appeared in anthologies, and with the exception of "Trees"—and to a much lesser extent "Rouge Bouquet" (1917–1918)—almost none have obtained lasting widespread popularity.

The entire corpus of Kilmer's work was produced between 1909 and 1918 when Romanticism and sentimental lyric poetry fell out of favor and Modernism took root—especially with the influence of the Lost Generation. In the years after Kilmer's death, poetry went in drastically different directions, as is seen especially in the work of T. S. Eliot and Ezra Pound. Kilmer's verse is conservative and traditional, and does not break the formal rules of poetics—he can be considered as one of the last poets of the Romantic era. His style has been criticized for not breaking free of traditional modes of rhyme, meter, and theme, and for being too sentimental to be taken seriously.

In the 1940 film, "The Fighting 69th", the role of Sergeant Joyce Kilmer was portrayed by actor Jeffrey Lynn.

== Tributes ==
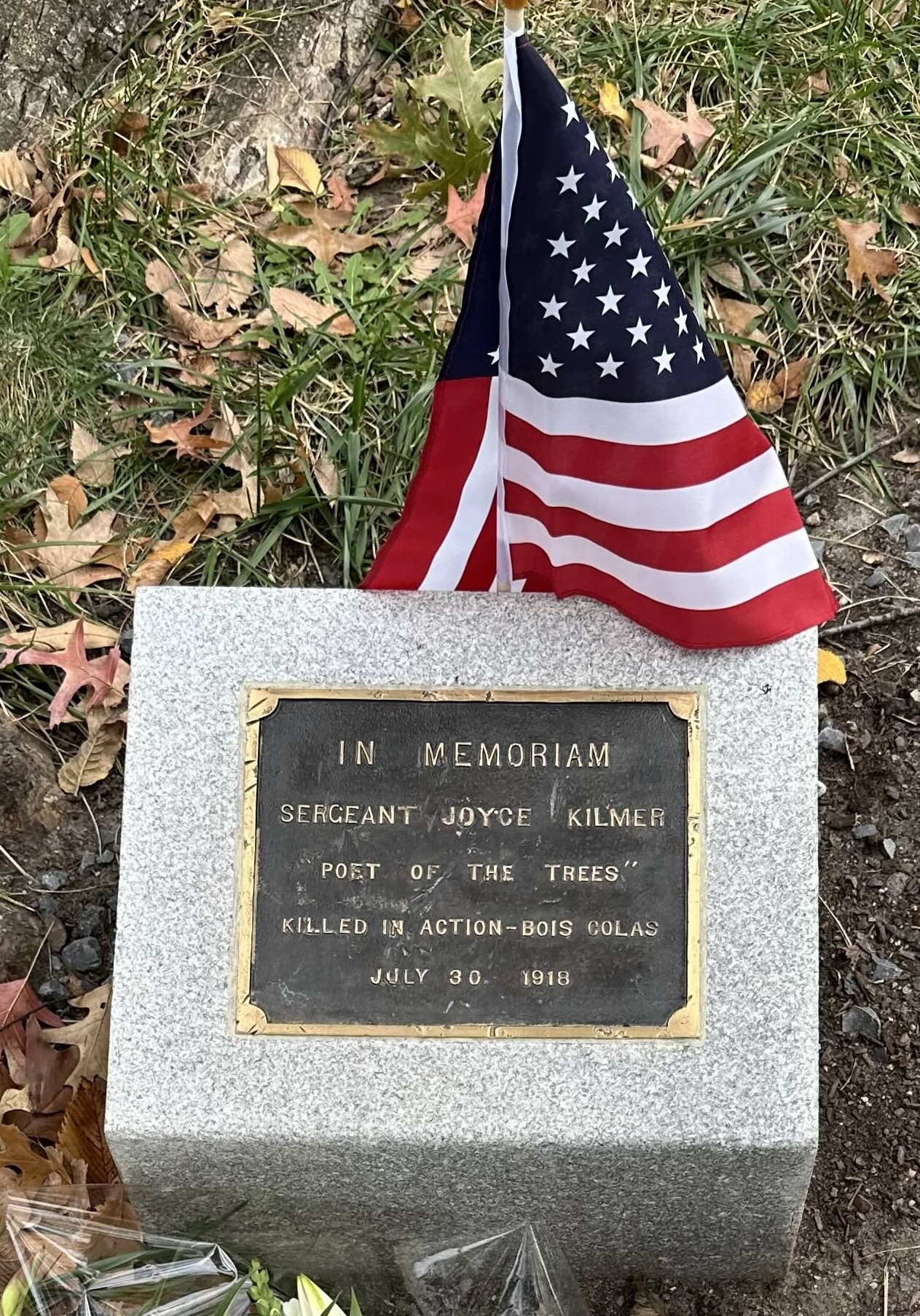
Refurbished plaque honoring Kilmer, "the poet of the trees", Central Park, NYC, November 2025

New York

- On November 8, 2025, as part of Veterans Day weekend, a refurbished plaque honoring Kilmer was unveiled in Central Park, New York City. The original plaque was laid down in 1931 and the renovation was undertaken via a collaboration between the Central Parks Conservancy and Veteran-run civics non-profit Operation Restore Decency. Before a crowd of 15 attendees, "Rouge Bouquet" was read aloud by Operation Restore Decency founder, U.S. Army Lieutenant Colonel (retired) Debjeet Sarkar followed by "Trees" which was read by Joyce Kilmer Society founder, Alex Michelini of Mahwah, NJ. The ceremony started with The National Anthem and concluded with "Taps" at 11:11 am for Armistice Day. Both were played by US Navy Veteran and bugler for Taps for Veterans, Stephen De Luca.
- Sgt. Joyce Kilmer Triangle in Midwood, Brooklyn is named after him. The triangle, a resting place on Kings Highway (Brooklyn) intersecting Quentin Road, between East 12th and 13th Streets (40.60789°N 73.96066°W), is the smallest park in New York City. occupying 0.001 acres (0.00040 ha) of land.
- Joyce Kilmer Park in the Bronx, New York, near Yankee Stadium, is named after him.

New Jersey

- A service plaza on the New Jersey Turnpike in East Brunswick is named after Kilmer
- Rutgers University had a plaque placed in 1986 that honors Kilmer at 50 Labor Center Way
- Inside Kirkpatrick Chapel, there is plaque in memory of those who died during the Great War from Rutgers College, Kilmer is listed at the bottom of the second column
- Joyce Kilmer School in Mahwah, New Jersey is named after him.
- Joyce Kilmer Elementary School in Cherry Hill, New Jersey

Illinois

- Joyce Kilmer Triangle in the Rogers Park neighborhood of Chicago is dedicated to him. A Chicago-area American Legion post named after Kilmer dedicated a plaque there at a small triangle formed by the intersection of Rogers Avenue, Ashland Avenue and Birchwood Avenue.
- Joyce Kilmer Elementary School in Chicago
- Joyce Kilmer Elementary School in Buffalo Grove

North Carolina

- Joyce Kilmer Memorial Forest in North Carolina, part of the Nantahala National Forest, is named after Kilmer.

Virginia

- The National Museum of the US Army features Kilmer in its "Soldiers' Stories" exhibit in the main lobby, Fort Belvoir, VA.
- Kilmer Middle School in Vienna, Virginia is named for Kilmer.

Pennsylvania

- Joyce Kilmer Natural Area in Bald Eagle State Forest, Pennsylvania is named after him.
- South Township, PA features a traffic circle centerpiece memorial to Kilmer with 2 metallic plaques and an open metal book with "Trees".

Massachusetts

- Joyce Kilmer School in West Roxbury (Boston), MA
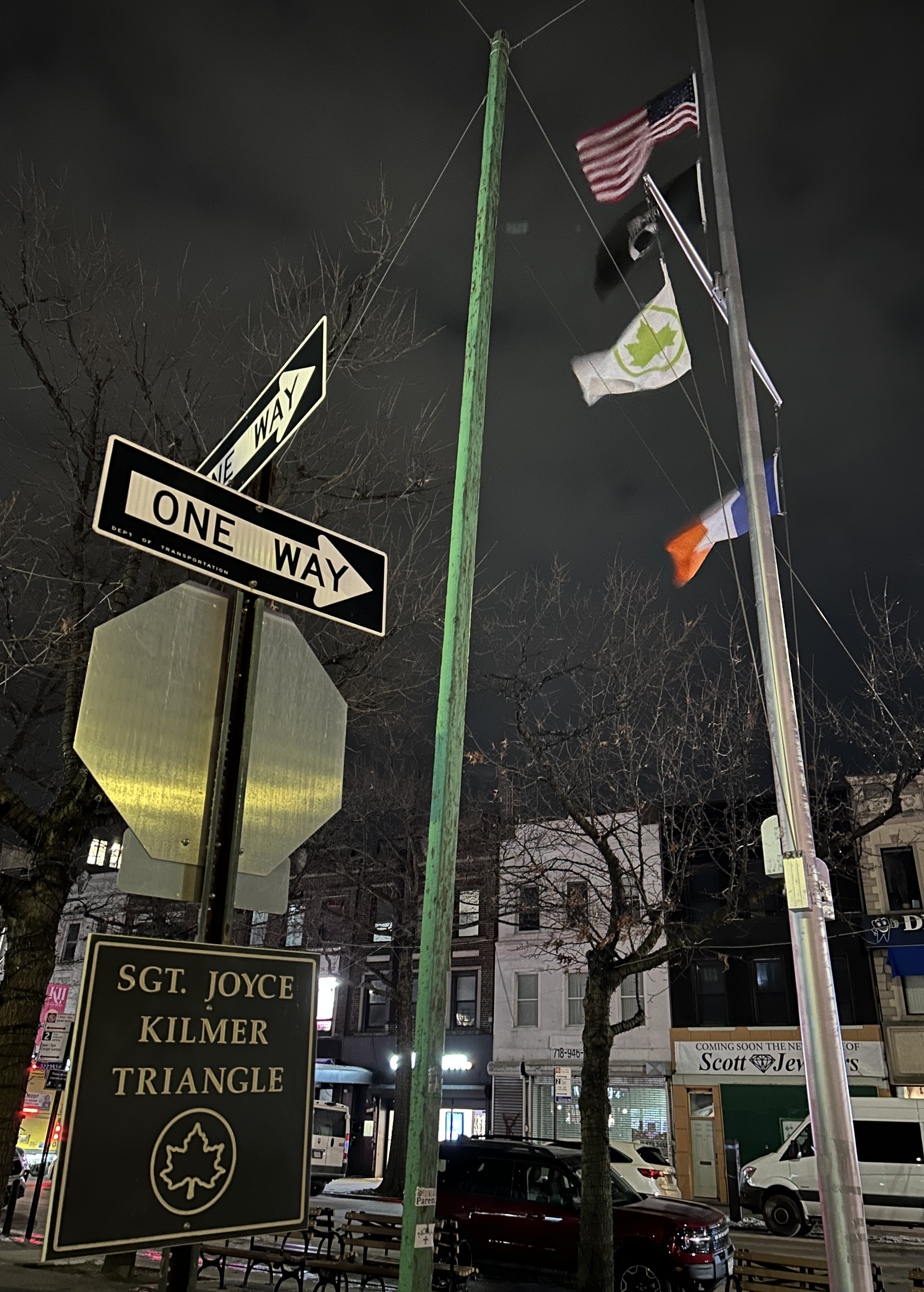
Sgt. Kilmer Triangle Park, Brooklyn, NY, January 2025

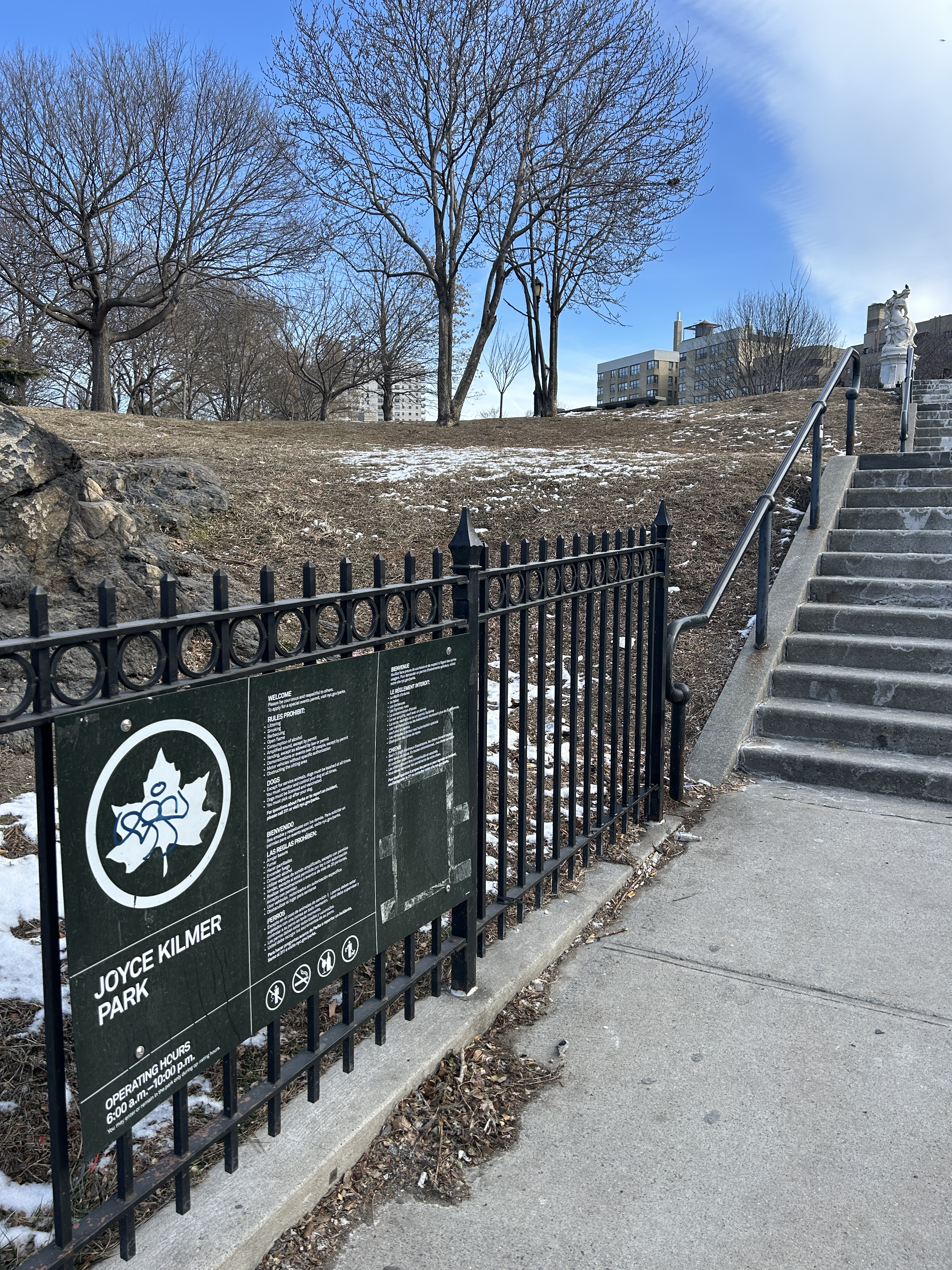
Joyce Kilmer Park, Bronx, NY, January 2025

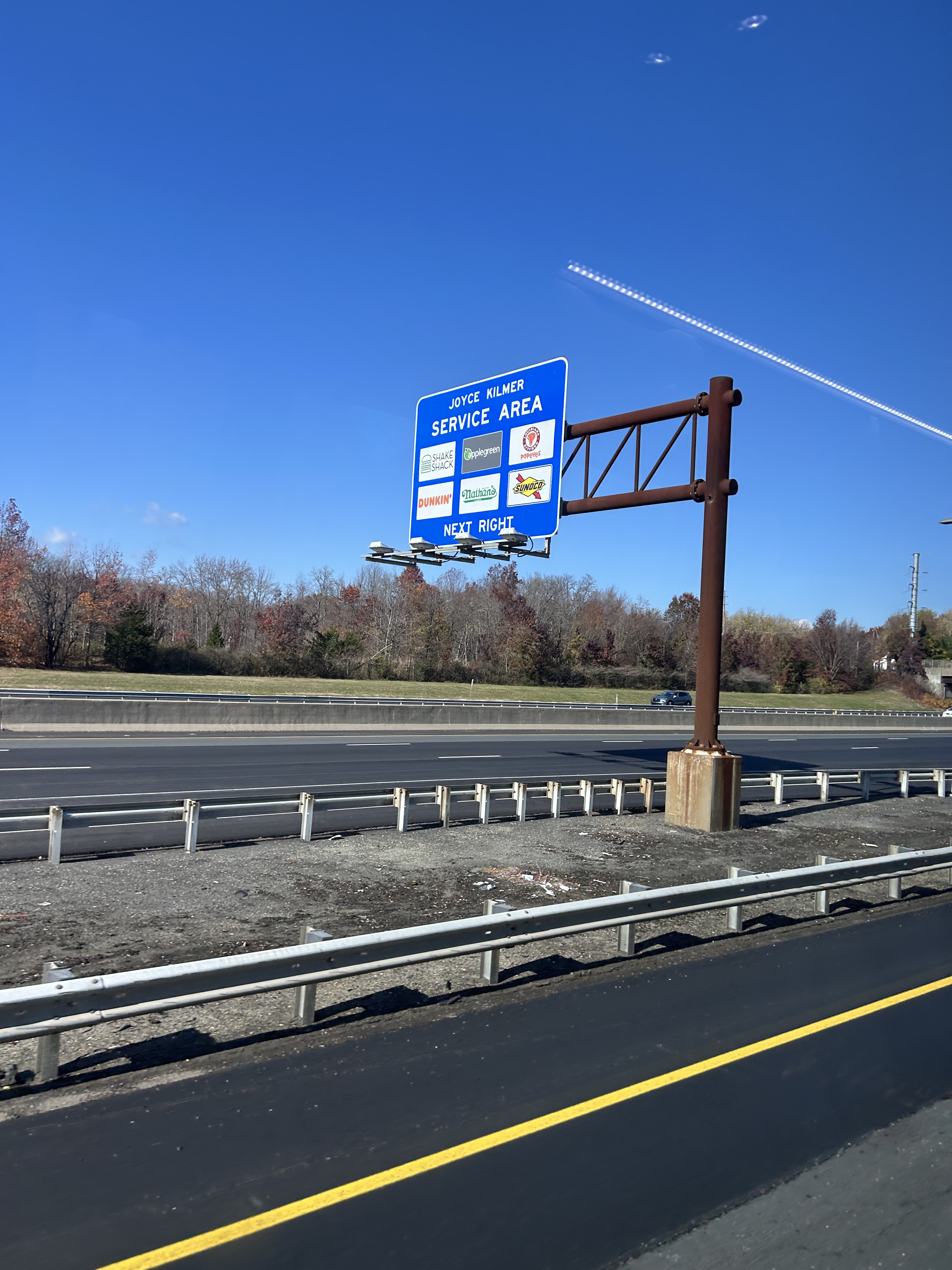
Joyce Kilmer Service Area, Northbound NJ Turnpike, between Exit 8A & 9

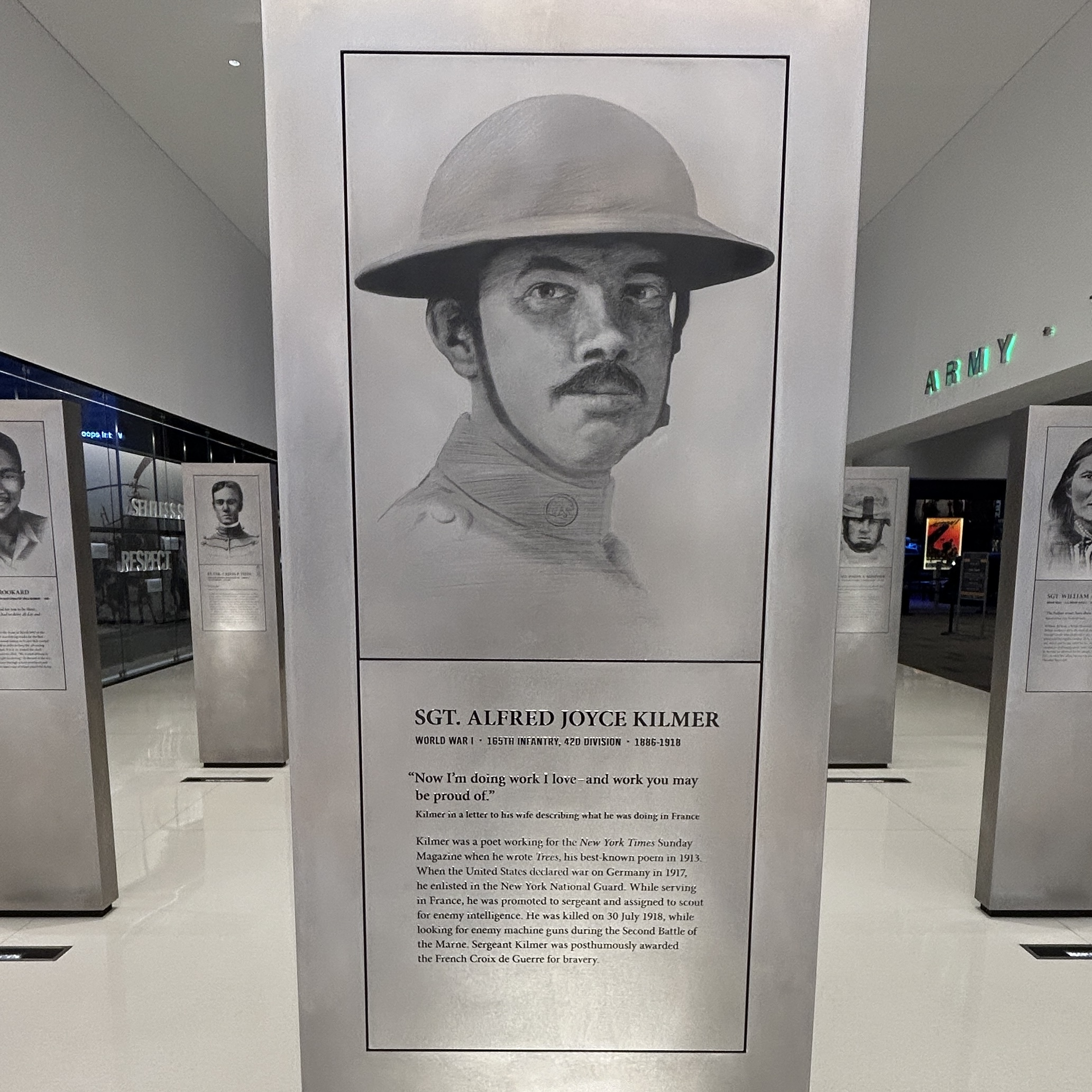
"Soldiers' Stories", NMUSA, Fort Belvoir, VA

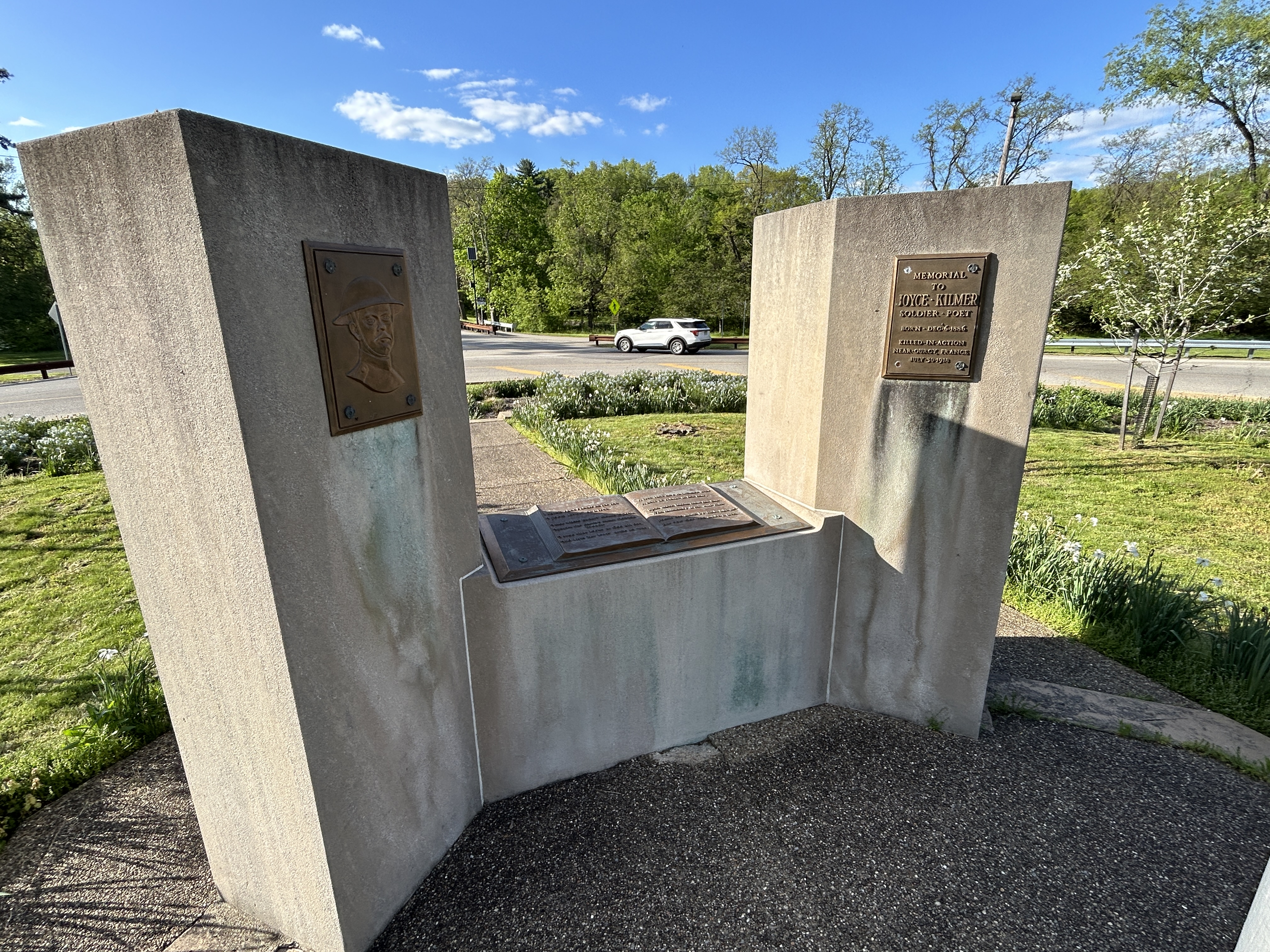
Kilmer Monument, South Township, PA

== Works ==
- 1911: Summer of Love (poetry)
- 1914: Trees and Other Poems (poetry)
- 1916: The Circus and Other Essays (essays)
- 1917: Main Street and Other Poems (poetry)
- 1917: The Courage of Enlightenment: An address delivered in Campion College, Prairie du Chien, Wisconsin, to the members of the graduating class, June 15, 1917
- 1917: Dreams and Images: An Anthology of Catholic Poets (poetry anthology, edited by Kilmer)
- 1917: Literature in the Making by some of its Makers (criticism)
- 1918: Poems, Essays and Letters in Two Volumes Volume One: Memoir and Poems, Volume Two: prose works (collected works) (published posthumously, edited by Robert Cortes Holliday)
- 1919: Kilmer's unfinished history of the Fighting 69th (145th Infantry) is posthumously printed in Father Duffy's Story by Francis P. Duffy (New York: Doran, 1919)
- 1921: The Circus and Other Essays and Fugitive Pieces (published posthumously)

== See also ==
- Joyce Kilmer Memorial Bad Poetry Contest
- List of places named after Joyce Kilmer
- Category:Poetry by Joyce Kilmer
