= Philolexian Society =

Columbia University literary society

- The Philolexian Seal, or Philogo
- Founded: 1802; 224 years ago Columbia University
- Type: Literary
- Affiliation: Independent
- Status: Active
- Emphasis: Debate and literary society
- Scope: Local
- Motto: Surgam "I shall rise"
- Colors: Philolexian Blue and Peithologian White
- Chapters: 1
- Nickname: Philo
- Headquarters: 500 W. 120th Street; New York City, New York 10027; United States
- Website: philo.org

The Philolexian Society of Columbia University is one of the oldest college literary and debate societies in the United States, and the oldest student group at Columbia. Founded in 1802, the society aims to "improve its members in Oratory, Composition and Forensic Discussion." The society traces its roots to a collegiate literary society founded in the 1770s by Alexander Hamilton, then a student at Columbia College, and was officially established by Hamilton's son, James Alexander Hamilton (Columbia College Class of 1805).

Philolexian (known to members as "Philo," pronounced with a long "i") has been called the "oldest thing at Columbia except for the College itself," and it has been an integral part of Columbia from the beginning, providing the institution with its distinctive color, Philolexian Blue (along with white, from her long-dispatched rival, the Peithologian Society).

== History ==
=== Founding ===
Philolexian is one of many collegiate literary societies that flourished at the nation's early colonial colleges. Before fraternities, publications, and other extracurriculars became common, these groups—which generally bore Greek or Latin names—were the sole source of undergraduate social life.

Columbia's first such society was formed in the 1770s when the school was still known as King's College; among this unnamed organization's members was future Treasury Secretary Alexander Hamilton (Class of 1778) and his roommate Robert Troup. After the Revolution, a similar group known as the Columbia College Society for Progress in Letters was formed; among its members were John P. Van Ness (Class of 1789), later mayor of Washington, D.C., and Daniel D. Tompkins (Class of 1795), vice president of the United States under James Monroe. The group became extinct in 1795.

Building on these earlier efforts, Philolexian was established on May 17, 1802. Among its earliest members were future Columbia president Nathaniel Fish Moore (Class of 1802), and Alexander Hamilton's son, James Alexander Hamilton (Class of 1805), U.S. Attorney for the Southern District of New York. To accommodate freshmen, who were initially ineligible for admission, the Peithologian Society was formed four years later. For most of the next 100 years, Peithologian would serve as Philolexian's primary literary rival.

For most of the 19th century, Philo engaged in a wide range of literary activities, including debates within and without the society, essay writing, correspondence, and hosting speeches by eminent men of the city. In 1852, at the organization's semi-centennial celebration, alumni raised a prize fund of over $1,300 to endow annual awards in three categories: Oratory, Debate, and Essay. (The awards were eventually combined into a general "Philolexian Prize" which, since the 1950s, has been awarded annually by Columbia University's English department.)

During Columbia College's tenure in midtown Manhattan from 1857 to 1896, Philolexian often held their meetings in an old paper factory in the northeast corner of the 49th street campus.

=== 20th century ===
In the 20th century, Philo broadened its range of activities as it became a training ground for essayist Randolph Bourne (Class of 1912), poet A. Joyce Kilmer (Class of 1908), and statesman V.K. Wellington Koo (Class of 1909), all prize winners in their time at Philo. In 1910 the society took a decidedly dramatic turn when it commenced a 20-year stretch of annual theatre productions, ranging from Elizabethan comedies to contemporary works. Many of the older productions, by the likes of Ben Jonson, Nicholas Udall, and Robert Greene, were North American debuts. Oscar-winning screenwriter Sidney Buchman (Mr. Smith Goes to Washington, Here Comes Mr. Jordan, Cleopatra) (Class of 1923) got a start playing Shakespeare's Richard II for a Philo production.

Although Philolexian members during the Great Depression included such figures as future Pulitzer Prize-winning poet John Berryman and publisher Robert Giroux (both Class of 1936) and noted Trappist monk and humanist Thomas Merton (Class of 1938), the economic hardships of the period severely curtailed the group's activities. By the late 1930s, according to former society president Ralph de Toledano (Class of 1938), the organization was devoted mainly to drinking wine and listening to jazz. Philo effectively ceased to function by the beginning of World War II.

But in 1943, at the behest of Columbia history professor and former Philo president Jacques Barzun (Class of 1927), several undergraduates competed for the Philolexian Centennial Washington Prize, an oratory competition endowed by J. Ackerman Coles (Class of 1864), bestowed on the society on the occasion of its centennial in 1902. This short-lived revival was followed by another wartime incarnation. By 1952, due to waning interest and, according to some, the infamous presidency of the poet Allen Ginsberg (Class of 1948), the society entered 10 years of dormancy. Another brief revival in 1962, spearheaded by members of the Columbia chapter of Alpha Delta Phi, was followed by an even longer period of inactivity.

On Wednesday, October 16, 1985, under the guidance of Thomas Vinciguerra (Class of 1985), the society was revived in its current incarnation. Mr. Vinciguerra was subsequently recognized as the society's "Avatar" in honor of this and other critical and successful efforts for Philo. In 2003, an award in his name was established. On Saturday, October 16, 2010, the society celebrated the 25th anniversary of its revival with a reception and meeting for students, alumni, and various supporters; the occasion was dubbed "Resurgam 25." The debate topic, "Resolved: The Philolexian Society Has Never Had It So Good" was overwhelmingly approved.

In 2001, a non-profit foundation was established by Philolexian alumni to aid the student society and preserve the history of the Society. In 2003, the society held a constitutional convention that updated the original document, adjusting the organization to suit changes that had happened in the previous 200 years, such as co-education. Nonetheless, the society has retained its traditional forms and rituals almost in their entirety. Philolexian has several officers, the Moderator (de facto president), Scriba, and Censor (emeritus president), as well as other positions, including Herald, Keeper of the Halls, Chancellor of the Exchequer, Sergeant-at-Arms, Whip, Minister of Internet Truth, Nomenclaturist-General, Symposiarch, and Literary Czar, editor of the literary journal of the Society.

== Symbols and traditions ==
The name Philolexia is Greek for "love of discourse," and the society's motto is the Latin word Surgam meaning "I shall rise." Its colors are Philolexian blue and Peithologian white, the latter in honor of a now-dormant rival society, the Peithologian. These colors were later appropriated by Columbia University for its own use. Its seal is called the Philogo.

== Activities ==
The Philolexian Society holds meetings every Thursday the university is in session; the agenda typically consists of a debate and the presentation of a literary work. It also hosts a Croquet Tea, the Annual Joyce Kilmer Memorial Bad Poetry Contest (which has received coverage in the New York Times) (the winner of which becomes the Poet Laureate of the society until the next Contest), a beat poetry event appropriately called Beat Night, and a Greek-style symposium.

The organization also publishes a collection of poetry, prose, and visual media called Surgam three times year. Its winter issue compiles the best entries from the Joyce Kilmer Memorial Bad Poetry Contest.

Starting in 2003, Philolexian has organized a fund for small theatre projects, later named for Robert C. Schnitzer (Class of 1927), and sponsored an improv comedy group called Klaritin.

== Membership ==
The number of Philolexians is unknown. Those who wish to gain full membership within the society must speak at three “consecutive” meetings and attend regularly. Those candidates who qualify may receive an invitation to New Member Night, a secretive initiation rite. A petition for membership and a work of original, creative merit must be provided by the candidate. This meeting is not open to the public. Members have access to a large number of privileges through the organization.

== Notable members ==
Philolexians have:

- Won:
  - Four Academy Awards
  - Three Pulitzer Prizes
  - Two Grammy Awards
  - One Emmy Award
- Included:
  - Eight United States Representatives
  - Eight college presidents
  - Five United States ambassadors
  - Four governors
  - Two United States Senators
  - Two Mayors of New York City
  - One Associate Justice of the Supreme Court of the United States
- Founded or co-founded:
  - The Travers Stakes
  - Harcourt Brace
  - Thom McAn Shoes
  - The New York Review of Books
  - Library of America
  - Writers Guild of America
  - The Century Association
  - Players' Club
- Been president of:
  - New-York Historical Society
  - New York Chamber of Commerce
  - New York Athletic Club
  - National Academy of Sciences
  - Doubleday
  - Authors' League of America
  - American Physical Society
  - American Mathematical Society
  - American Anthropological Association
  - The American Jewish Committee
  - American Historical Association
  - American Society of Civil Engineers
  - American Academy of Arts and Letters
  - Association for Asian Studies
  - The Union League Club of New York

== See also ==
- List of college literary societies
