= Seringes-et-Nesles =

- Commune
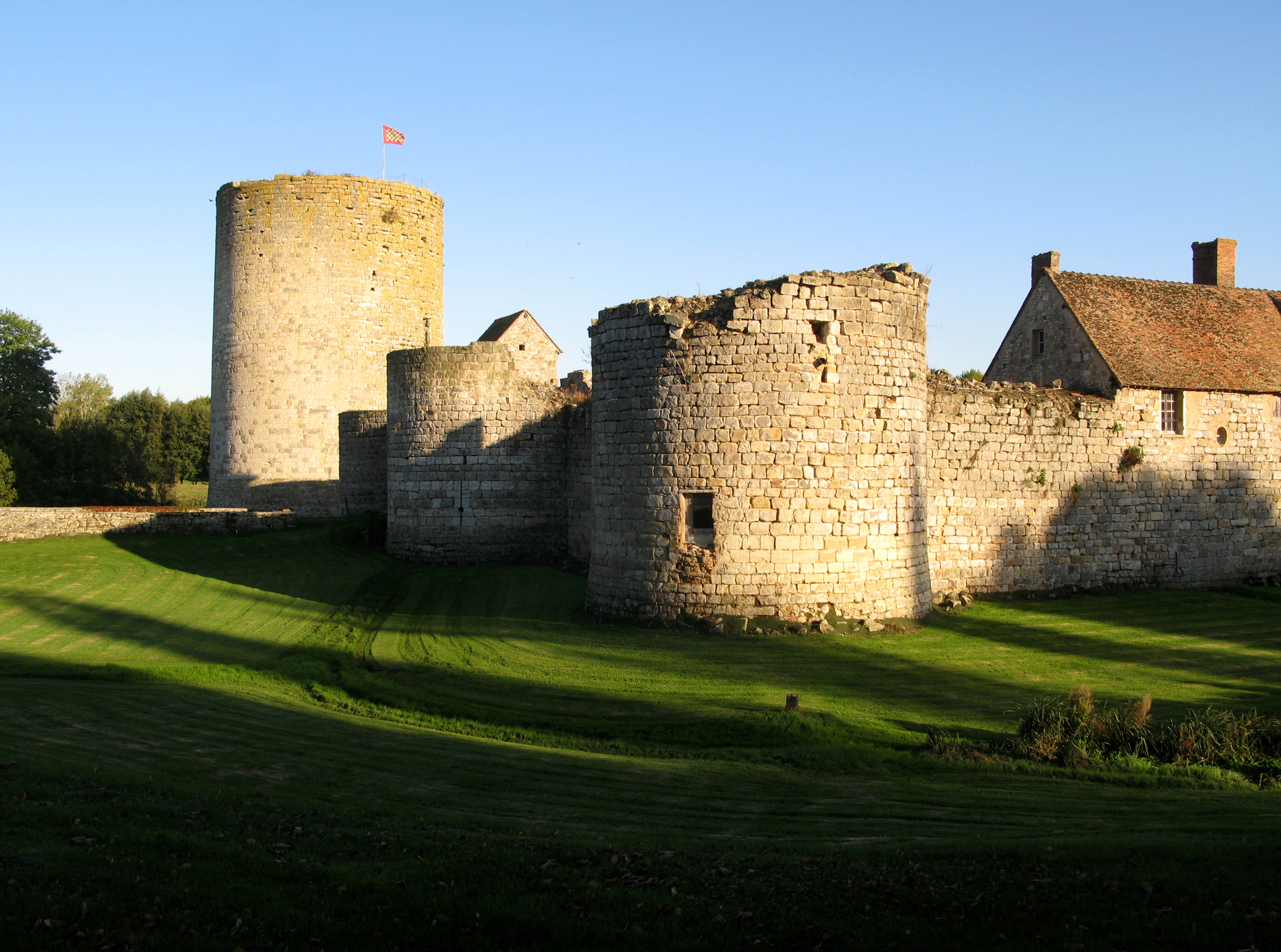
- The chateau of Nesles
- Location of Seringes-et-Nesles
- Location within France Location within Hauts-de-France
- Coordinates: 49°12′22″N 3°32′30″E
- Country: France
- Region: Hauts-de-France
- Department: Aisne
- Arrondissement: Château-Thierry
- Canton: Fère-en-Tardenois
- Intercommunality: CA Région de Château-Thierry

Government
  - Mayor (2026–32): Didier Fernandez
- Area^{1}: 13.49 km^{2} (5.21 sq mi)
- Elevation: 165 m (541 ft)
- Highest elevation: 193 m (633 ft)
- Lowest elevation: 117 m (384 ft)
- Population (2023): 273
  - Density: 20.2/km^{2} (52.4/sq mi)
- Time zone: UTC+01:00 (CET)
  - Summer (DST): UTC+02:00 (CEST)
- INSEE/Postal code: 02713 /02130
- ^{1} French Land Register data, which excludes lakes, ponds, glaciers > 1 km^{2} (0.386 sq mi or 247 acres) and river estuaries.

Seringes-et-Nesles (French pronunciation: [səʁɛ̃ʒ e nɛl]) is a commune in the Aisne department in Hauts-de-France in northern France.

== History ==
The villages of Seringes and Nesles merged between 1790 and 1794.

== Population ==
Historical population
Year	Pop.	±% p.a.
1968	278	—
1975	217	−3.48%
1982	218	+0.07%
1990	245	+1.47%
1999	237	−0.37%
2007	284	+2.29%
2012	289	+0.35%
2017	276	−0.92%
2023	273	−0.18%
Source: INSEE

== See also ==
- Communes of the Aisne department
