= 69th New York Infantry Regiment =

Union Army unit in the American Civil War

69th Infantry Regiment
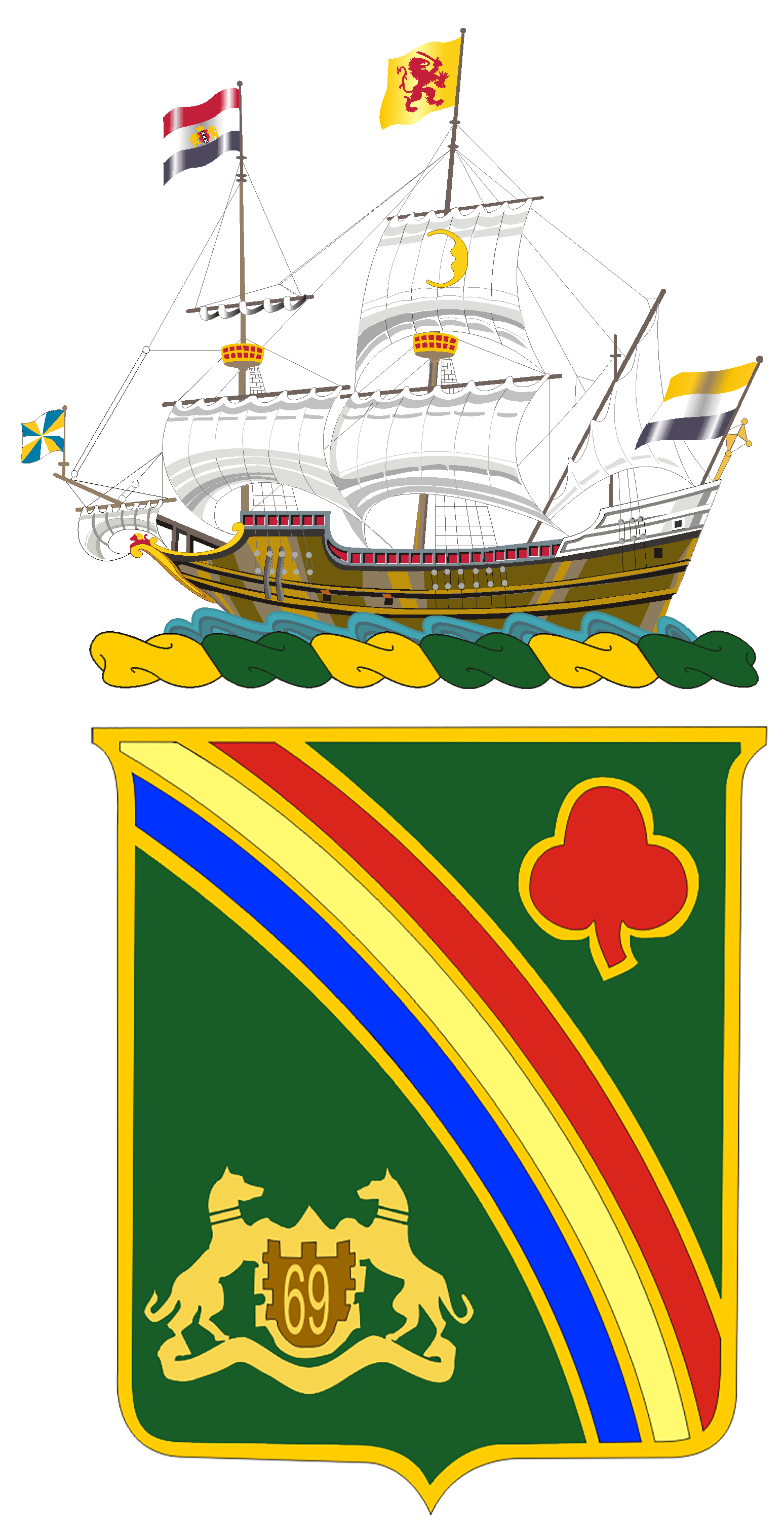
- 69th Infantry Regiment coat of arms
- Active: 1849–present
- Country: United States
- Branch: New York Army National Guard
- Type: Infantry
- Role: Light infantry
- Size: One battalion
- Garrison/HQ: 69th Regiment Armory; New York City; 40°44′29″N 73°59′2″W
- Nickname: Fighting Sixty-Ninth (special designation)
- Mottos: Gentle When Stroked; Fierce when Provoked; Battle cries: "Faugh a Ballagh ("Clear the Way!") (Civil War); "Garryowen in Glory!" (WWI)
- Colors: Green
- March: Garryowen
- Mascot: Irish Wolfhound
- Anniversaries: 17 March (St Patrick's Day)
- Engagements: American Civil War; Bull Run, VA 1861; Yorktown, VA 1862; Antietam, MD 1862; Fredericksburg, VA 1862; Chancellorsville, VA 1863; Gettysburg, PA 1863; Petersburg, VA 1864; Appomattox, VA 1865; World War I; Rouge Bouquet Chausailles, France 1917; Champagne, France 1918; St. Mihiel, France 1918; Meuse-Argonne, France 1918; World War II; Makin Island, Kiribati 1943; Saipan, Northern Mariana Islands 1944; Okinawa, Japan 1945; Iraqi Campaign; Taji 2004; Radwiniyah 2004; Baghdad 2005

Commanders
- Current commander: Lt. Col. Andrew Prior
- Command Sergeant Major: CSM Sean Goodridge
- Notable commanders: Michael Corcoran; Thomas Francis Meagher; Frank R. McCoy; "Wild Bill" Donovan; Martin H. Foery

Insignia
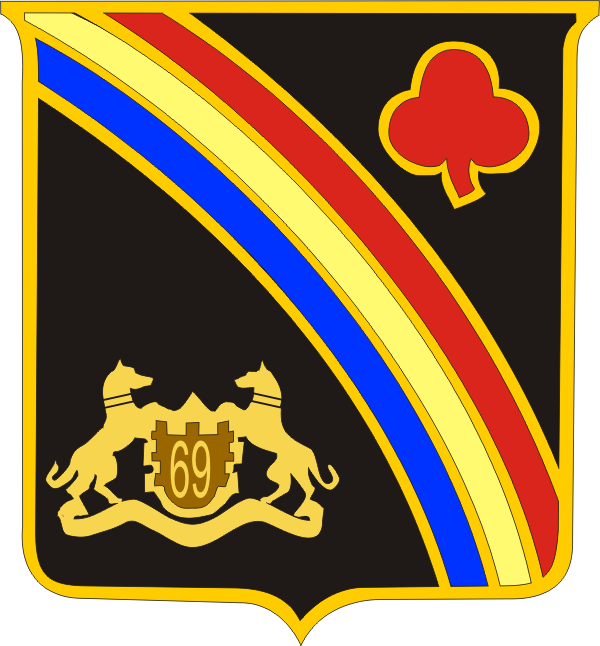
- Distinctive unit insignia

The 69th Infantry Regiment is an infantry regiment of the United States Army. It is from New York City, part of the New York Army National Guard. It is known as the "Fighting Sixty-Ninth", a name said to have been given by Robert E. Lee during the Civil War. An Irish-American heritage is attributed to the regiment, which is also nicknamed the "Fighting Irish" – a tradition mentioned in Joyce Kilmer's poem "When the 69th Comes Back". Between 1917 and 1992 it was also designated the 165th Infantry Regiment. It is headquartered at the 69th Regiment Armory in Manhattan.

The regiment currently consists of a single light infantry battalion (1st Battalion, 69th Infantry Regiment) and is part of the 27th Infantry Brigade of the 42nd Infantry Division. The regiment has seen combat in four wars: the American Civil War, World War I, World War II, and the Iraq War. It has also participated in 23 campaigns, so many that the staffs of its regimental colors are authorized to be one foot longer than normal to accommodate them all.

== Early history and lineage ==
Late in the 20th century, the U.S. Army changed the lineage and the founding date of the 69th Regiment from 1851 to 21 December 1849 with Company A, 1st Battalion descending from the 8th Company of the New York Regiment of the American Revolutionary War.

=== Unrelated Regular Army units designated as 69th Infantry Regiment ===
During the period when the "Fighting 69th" was assigned the National Guard "100 Series" regiment number of 165th Infantry, two Regular Army units were also designated as "69th Infantry Regiment." Neither of these unrelated federal units ever saw combat.

The first 69th Infantry Regiment was constituted 9 July 1918 in the Regular Army as the 69th Infantry and assigned to the 10th Infantry Division, organized 10 August 1918 at Camp Funston, Kansas, from personnel of the 41st Infantry. Relieved from the 10th Division and demobilized 13 February 1919 at Camp Funston. The second 69th Infantry Regiment was constituted 1 October 1933 in the Regular Army as the 69th Infantry (Light Tanks) and allotted to the Seventh Corps Area. Organized about 1936 with headquarters at Minneapolis, Minnesota. Disbanded 11 November 1944.

=== Background ===
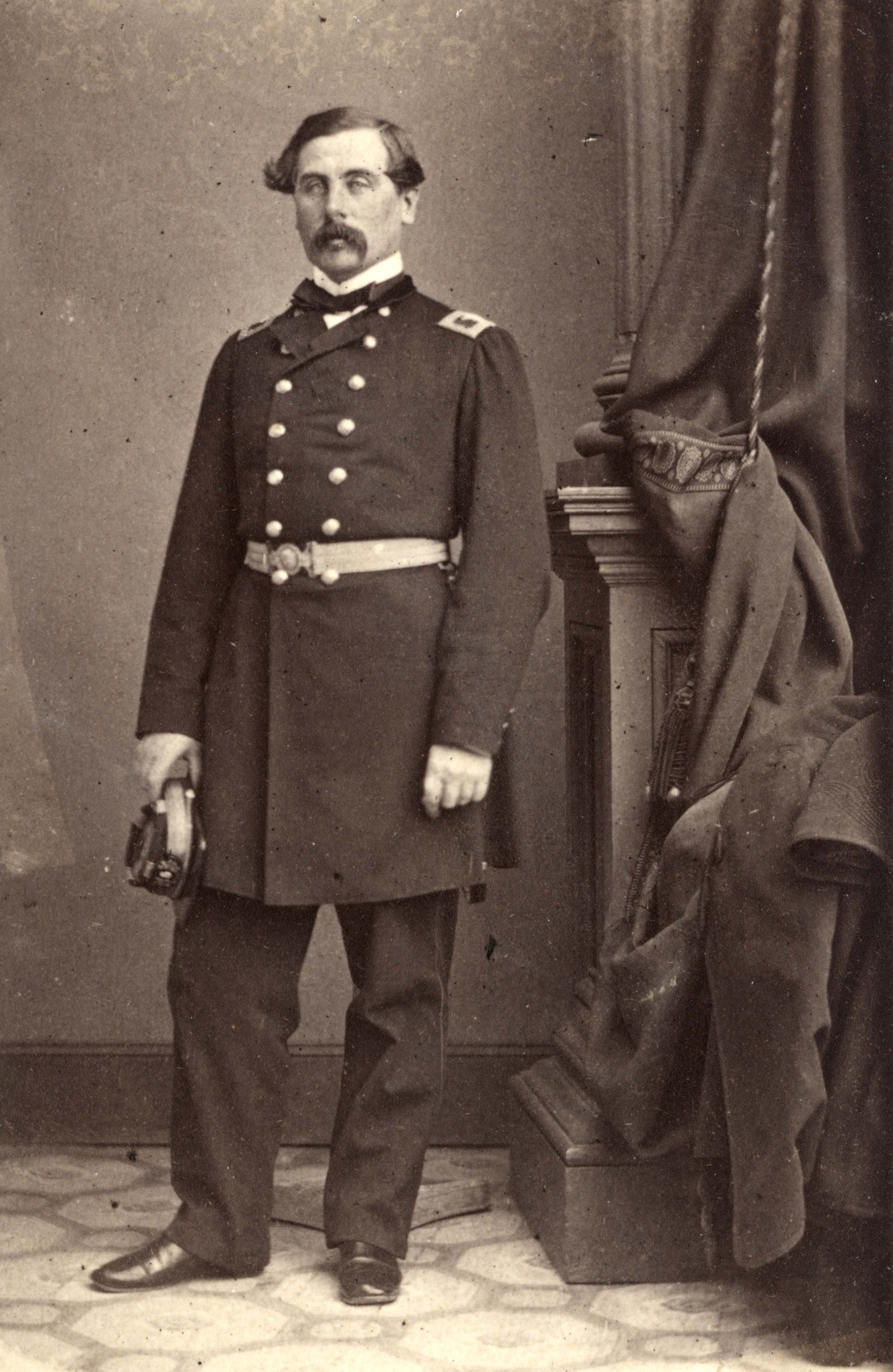
Thomas Francis Meagher

After the failed 1848 Young Ireland rebellion against British rule in Ireland, numerous Young Irelanders fled to the United States, with many of them settling in New York. Irish nationalists in New York soon made efforts to organize a military unit in order to assist in efforts to gain Irish independence from Britain. In late 1848, Irish-Americans in the city organized several independent military companies, holding drills at the Center Market. By mid-1849, an undermanned "1st Irish Regiment" had been formed from the independent companies, which the 69th traces its lineage to. Irish nationalist Michael Doheny, who had fled to the U.S. following the failure of the Young Ireland rebellion, was instrumental in the establishment of the independent companies and served as a company commander in the 1st Irish Regiment. In 1849, Irish-American leaders in New York City convinced the state government to establishment a U.S. Army regiment drawn from the independent companies. On 21 December 1849, their proposals were adopted by the state government. Doheny, Richard O'Gorman and James Huston, (all of whom had participated in the Young Ireland rebellion) and Michael Phelan, who had not, all supported Irish-Americans enlisting in the New York State Militia with the hopes that this training would be useful in future Irish nationalist activities. As a result, the original 9th Regiment, established in 1799, was disbanded on 27 May 1850, and its companies transferred to the 8th Regiment. Two days later, on 29 May, the 1st Irish Regiment was mustered into the New York State Militia as the 9th Regiment with Colonel Benjamin Clinton Ferris as its commander.

The 2nd Irish Regiment was organized on 12 October 1851, and mustered into the New York State Militia on 1 November as the 69th Regiment. Doheny left the 9th and enlisted in the 69th at the rank of lieutenant-colonel. In May 1852, the 72nd Regiment was established on Long Island. Thomas Francis Meagher, another leader of the Young Ireland rebellion, escaped to New York in 1852. Doheny then began to organize another Irish-American regiment with Meagher as the regimental commander. Doheny subsequently left the 69th and became the lieutenant-colonel of the new regiment, designed as the 75th Regiment and formed from new and existing independent companies as the "Republican Rifles". Since Meagher was rarely in New York, Doheny served as de facto commander of the 75th. By the summer of 1853, the three Irish-American regiments had reached maximum strength, and their commanders moved between the regiments throughout the 1850s. Captain James Huston left the 9th to join the 69th, as did Doheny. Meagher was appointed lieutenant-colonel of the 69th in 1855 but declined the position as he was not a U.S. citizen. The three regiments co-existed until late 1858 when all three were merged into the 69th; the 9th Regiment ceased to exist until 1859 when it was re-organized once again.

=== Tensions in New York City ===
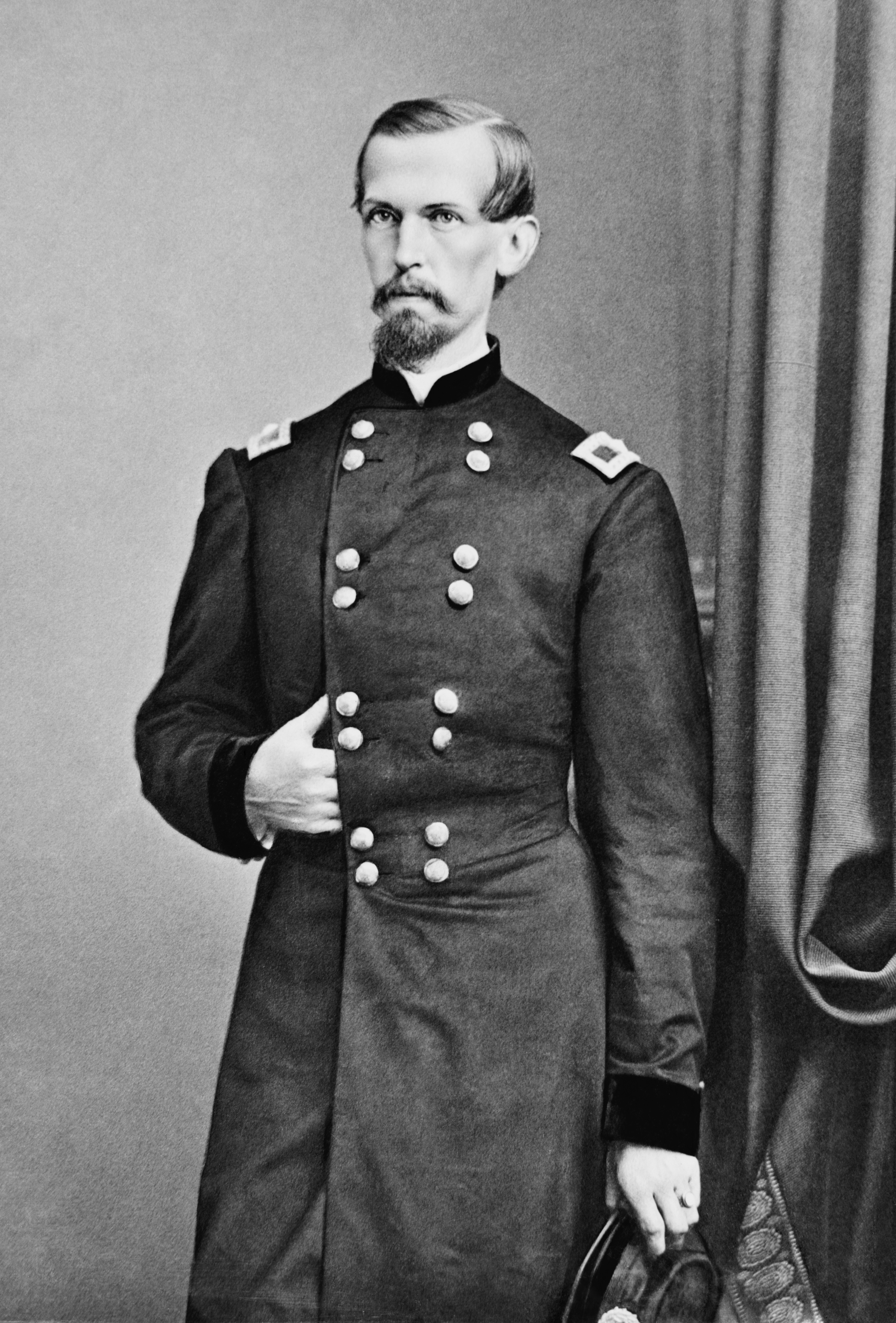
Michael Corcoran

The new Irish Catholic regiments caused uneasiness among the nativist Know Nothing Party, whose membership was limited to White Anglo-Saxon Protestants. In 1852, nativists in New York formed a new militia regiment designated the 71st Regiment, the "American Guard", commanded by Colonel Vosburg until he died in 1861. Although the 69th and the 71st represented opposite views and had no contact during the 1850s, they became close in 1861 when both were stationed in Washington, D.C., prior to the First Battle of Bull Run. Within the 9th Regiment, Huston led a secret society of Irish revolutionaries known as the SF. Academic Patrick D. Flaherty claimed that the SF stood for "Silent Friends" in a 1973 book, though military historian J.C.P. Stokes claimed it instead stood for "Sinn Feins" in a 1953 letter.

The outbreak of the Crimean War in 1854 was perceived as an opportunity for Irish nationalists to strike against Britain, but disputes between Huston and Doheny led to a lack of action. Huston left the 69th but conflicts continued. Although radical Irish societies were formed, all attempts to strike a blow for Ireland failed. Conflicts between Archbishop Hughes and the Irish Revolutionary leaders further exacerbated the situation. In 1855, racial, religious, and political tension was high in New York City. In January, prominent Bowery Boys gang leader William Poole was killed. Two Irishmen were arrested for the crime. The Know Nothings tried to stir up anti-Catholic sentiment, and there were several riots and both the 69th and the 9th were called to restore order. It was decided that military units would not march in the city's St. Patrick's Day Parade due to the ongoing tensions. On St. Patrick's Day 1855, the 9th, 69th, 7th, and 12th Regiments were held at the parade ground to await orders rather than march in the parade. As soon as the 69th was released, they marched with fixed bayonets down Broadway through the park before they were dismissed. The other military units did not march. Other U.S. states eliminated ethnic-oriented militias in the 1850s because of similar tensions. By 1858 the only Irish regiment remaining would be the 69th.

A new Irish secret society called the Fenians arose. Although not powerful within the 9th, they were extremely so within the 69th. After the consolidation with the 9th in 1858, the 69th adopted the 9th name of "National Cadets". The Fenians were founded as the Irish Revolutionary Brotherhood in 1858 by James Stephens, a leader of the 1848 Revolt. Michael Corcoran was second in command. At the outbreak of the Civil War, Corcoran commanded the 69th Regiment and was also the head of the Fenians. As their leader, he advised the Fenian membership not to join the militia.

=== The Prince of Wales Parade ===
In 1860, Michael Corcoran was appointed as colonel of the 69th. He gained fame and notoriety when he refused to parade the regiment for the visiting Prince of Wales in protest against British rule in Ireland. He was removed from command, but a planned court-martial against him was dropped when the American Civil War broke out. During the Civil War, Irish-Americans leaders organized fundraising activities for the Union Army. Michael Phalen (an SF leader within the 9th) and Richard O'Gorman, raised funds for families of soldiers from the 69th wounded at Bull Run in 1861. Huston was killed at Gettysburg in 1863. Meagher returned from Bull Run to form the new Irish Brigade. Corcoran, captured at Bull Run, returned to New York and formed another Irish Brigade called Corcoran's Legion. Doheny died in 1862. In the early 1850s, he had stopped believing that Irish units should be organized within the militia system since it created a conflict of allegiances.

== The Civil War ==
Green Ensign of the 1st Regiment (69th N. Y. Volunteer Infantry), Irish Brigade, Union Army

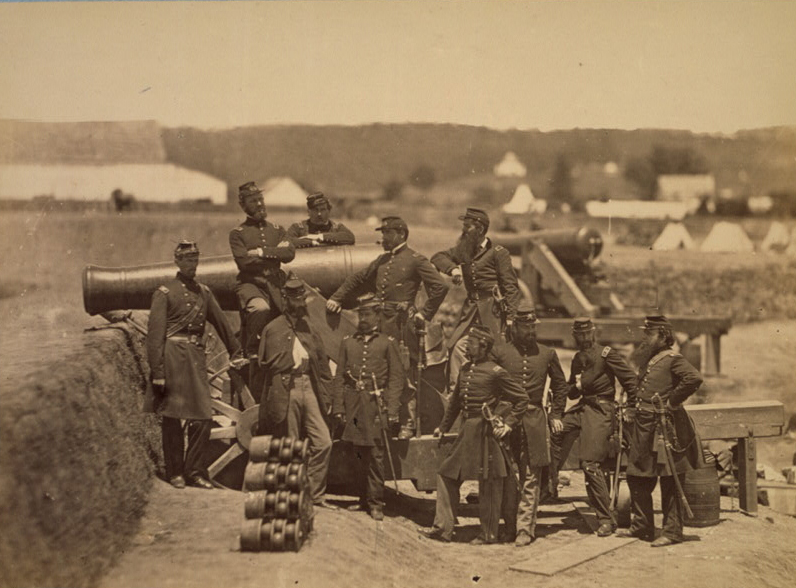
Officers of the 69th New York Volunteer Regiment with a cannon at Fort Corcoran in 1861. Michael Corcoran at left

The 69th Infantry Regiment traces its Civil War honors through three units, the 1st Regiment of the Irish Brigade (69th Infantry New York State Volunteers (NYSV) (1st Regiment of the Irish Brigade)), the 182nd New York Volunteer Infantry (69th Artillery, serving as infantry, the 1st Regiment of Corcoran's Legion) and the 69th National Guard Infantry (State Militia). The Irish Brigade was noted for its ability to tackle tough missions. As one war correspondent said during the Civil War, "When anything absurd, forlorn, or desperate was to be attempted, the Irish Brigade was called upon."

=== Bull Run ===
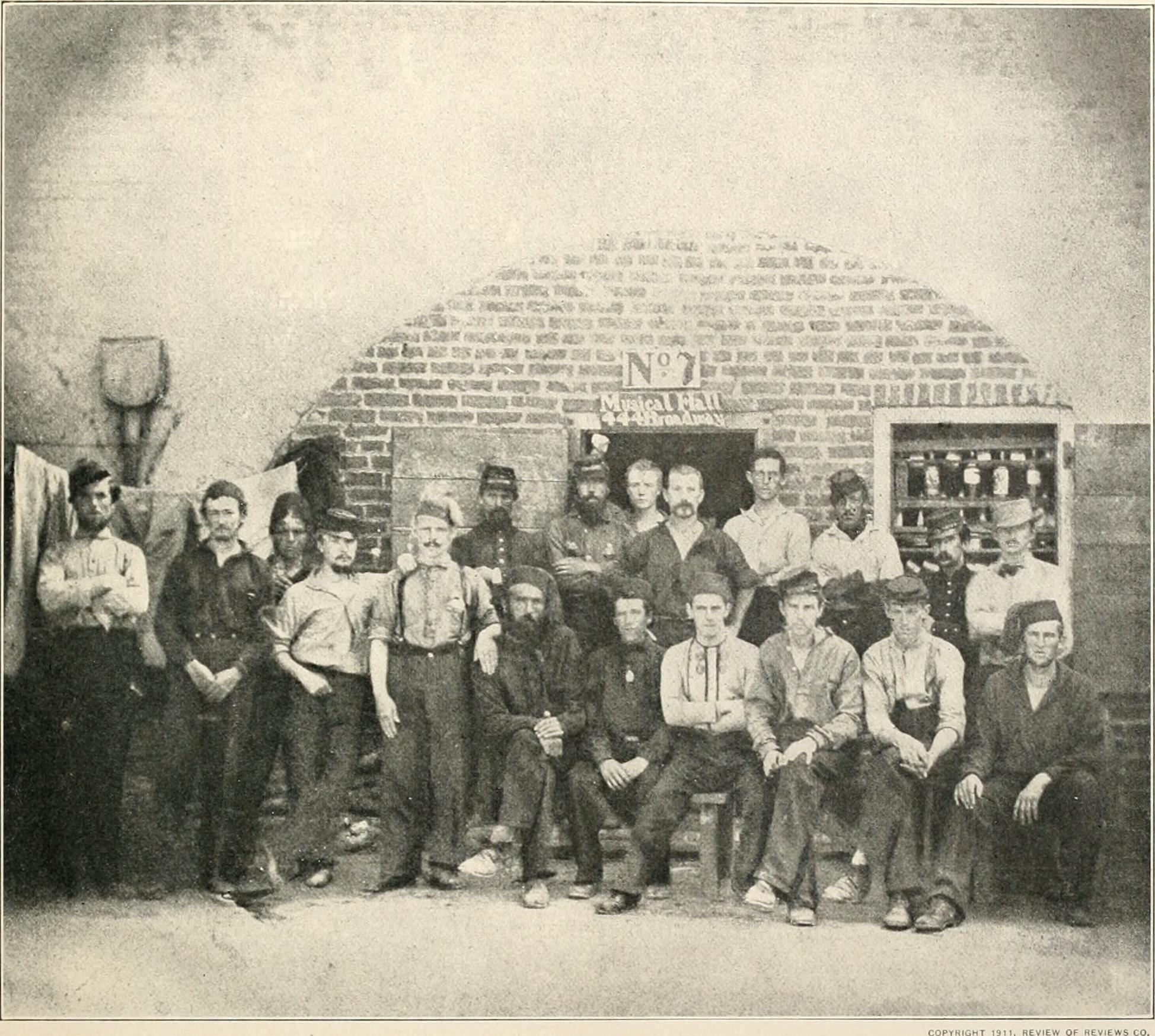
Corcoran's soldiers during their captivity in Charleston

The 69th New York Militia was called up and sent to Washington in April 1861. After engaging in the assault in the First Battle of Bull Run, the regiment, along with the Fire Zouaves, formed the rear-guard of the Union Army and protected it as it made its retreat towards Washington. The commander, Colonel Michael Corcoran, was taken prisoner during two charges at a Confederate artillery battery. Besides their colonel and second-in-command, the 69th sustained losses of 41 men killed, 85 wounded, and 60 prisoners. Thomas Francis Meagher, Captain of the regiment's Zouave company, was promoted to colonel. The immense painting commemorating this, "Return of the 69th (Irish) Regiment" by Louis Lang, is on display at the New York Historical Society

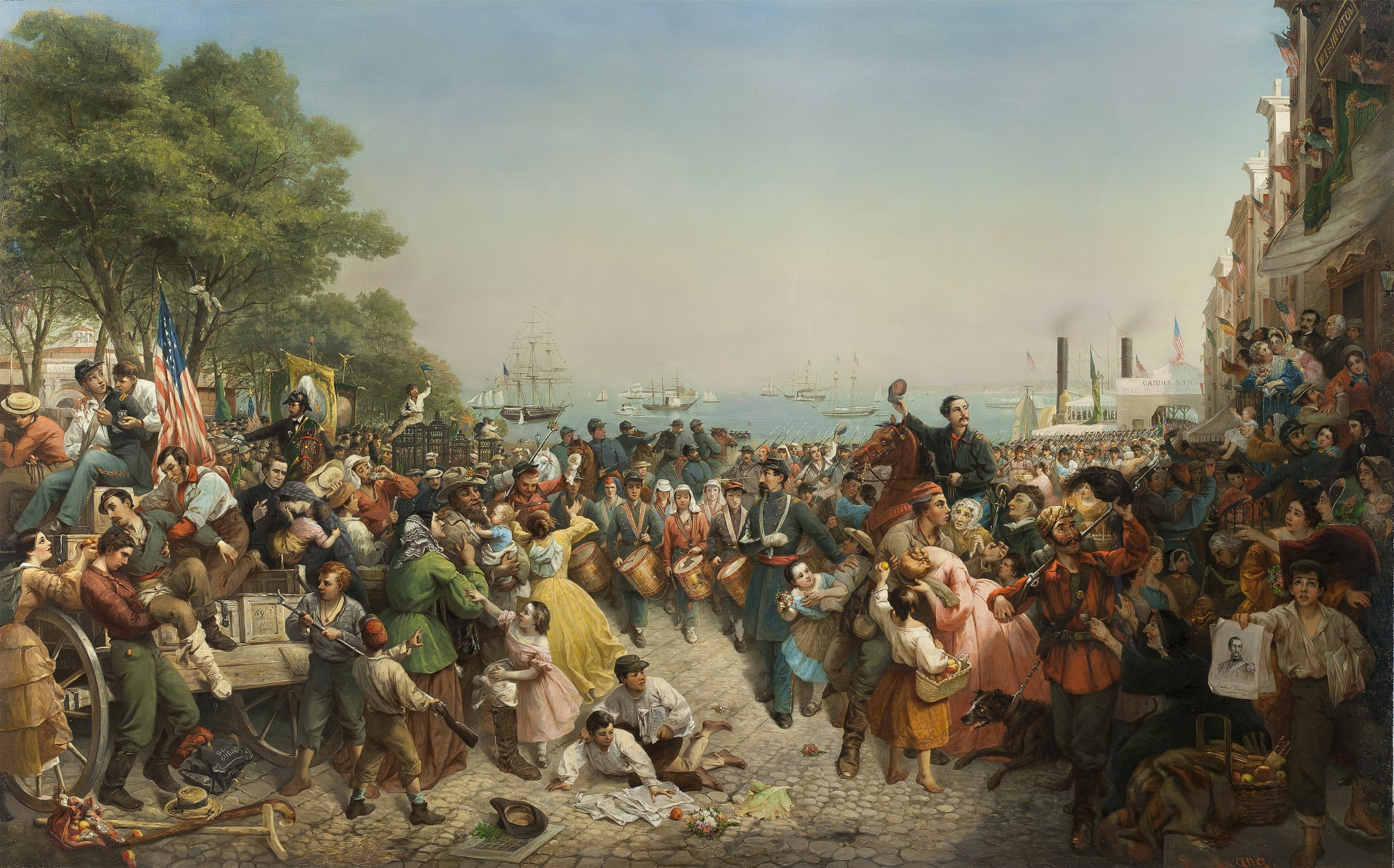
Return of the 69th (Irish) Regiment, N.Y.S.M. from the Seat of War, 1862–63, Louis Lang

=== The Seven Days ===
After 90 days of service, the 69th New York State Militia was mustered out and re-enrolled as the 69th New York State Volunteers. Meagher proposed the creation of an Irish Brigade in which the 69th would form the first regiment. Meagher was promoted to brigadier general and given command of the new brigade. The "Irish Brigade", then 3,000 strong, saw heavy action during the Seven Days Battles.

=== Malvern Hill and Antietam ===
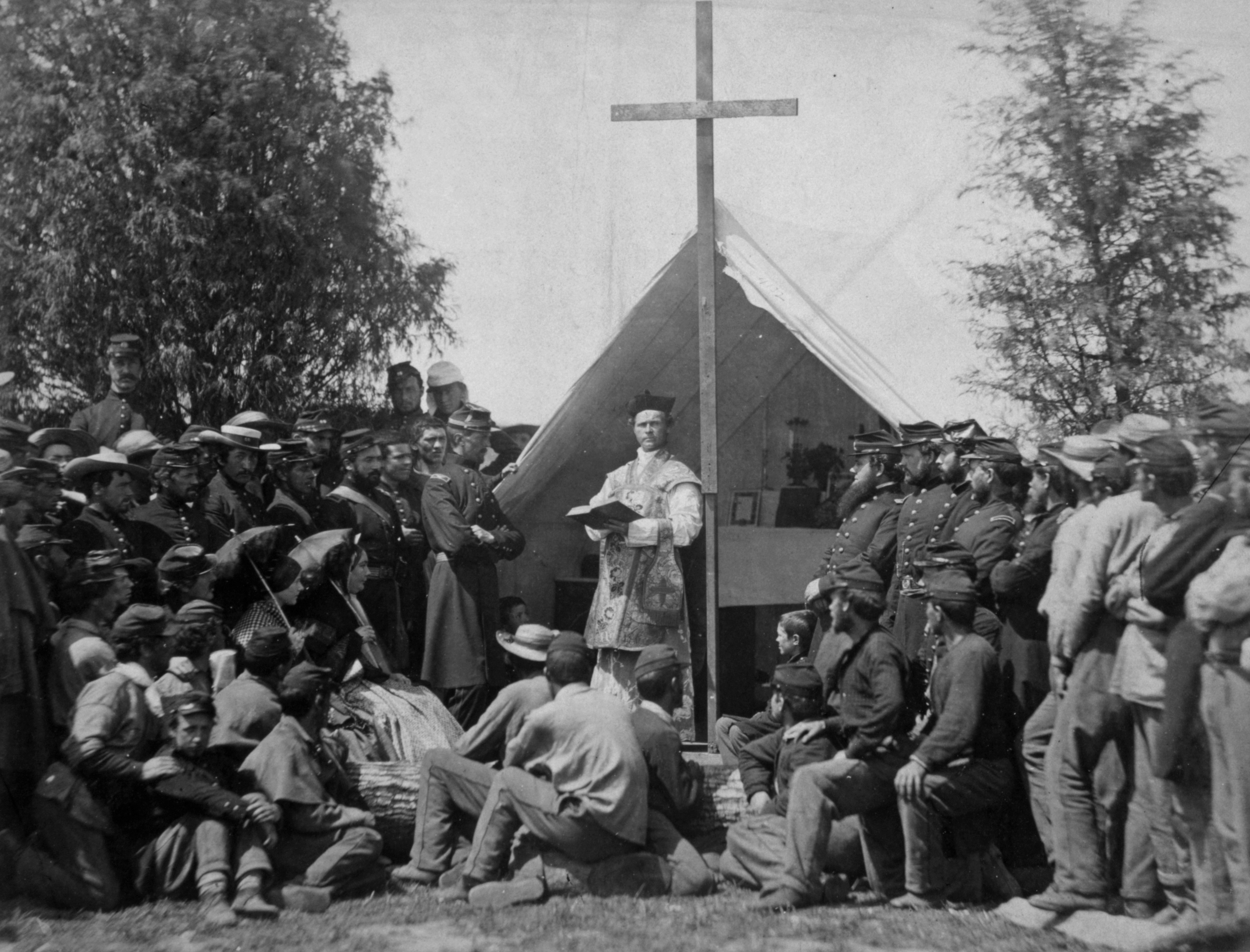
Fr. Thomas Mooney leading prayers-69th New York State Militia. Note the use of civilian hats by the men.

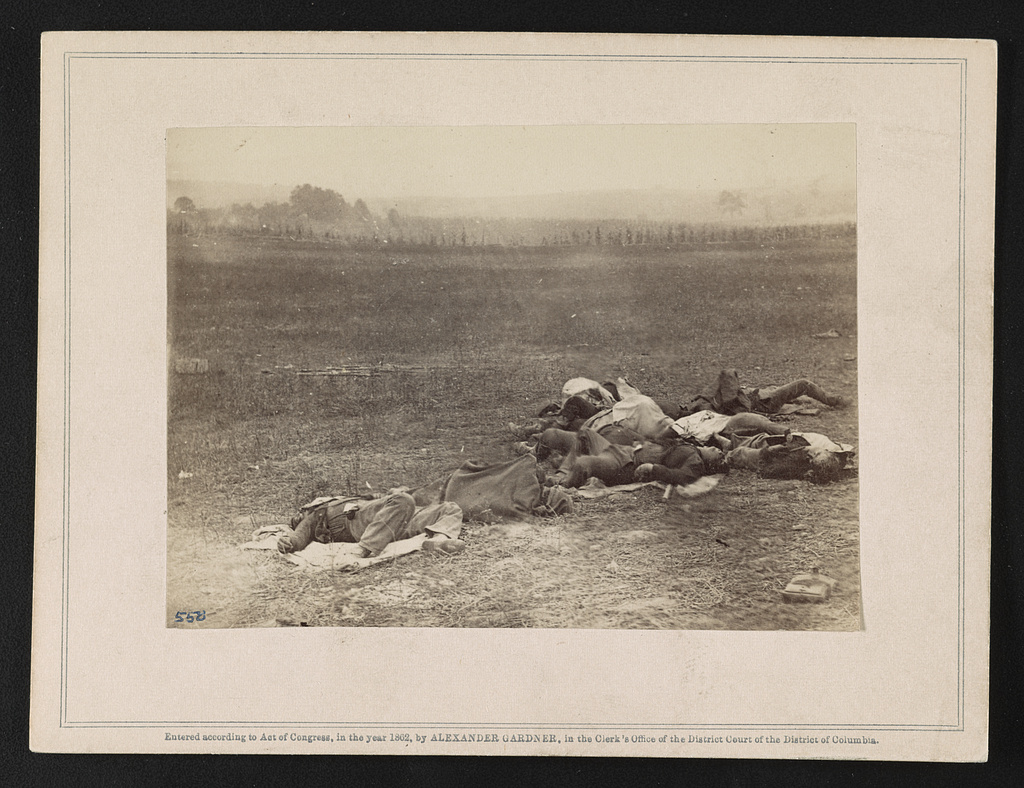
Confederate Dead at Antietam Maryland 1862 incorrectly identified and sold as dead of the Irish Brigade; another version correctly identifies the deceased as Confederates but at the wrong location; (Note: Slightly cropped to eliminate black and white bars at top and bottom) for correct identification see Kalasky.

At Malvern Hill, the 69th led the brigade in a charge against advancing Southern troops. The 69th forced the retreat of the famed Confederate Brigade the Louisiana Tigers, an event for which General Robert E. Lee gave the regiment its nickname, "The Fighting 69th". Later, in both World War I and Operation Iraqi Freedom, the 69th and the Louisiana Tigers fought side by side against a common enemy.

At Antietam, General Meagher personally led the 69th as the Irish Brigade charged the Sunken Road. They fought for three hours and made five charges against dug-in Confederate forces at the Sunken Road. Fighting became hand to hand as the 69th charged into Confederates lines. Eight color-bearers were shot down. General Meagher had his horse shot out from under him and he was carried unconscious from the battlefield. Suffering devastating 60% casualties, the 69th withdrew.

=== Fredericksburg, Chancellorsville, and Gettysburg ===
The regiment was virtually destroyed in its uphill attack on the well-prepared Confederate positions on Marye's Heights during the Battle of Fredericksburg, suffering more casualties than they had at Antietam. Afterward, the audacity of the attack was saluted with a rousing cheer by the Confederate defenders. The salute came with a price. The 69th lost 512 out 1,000 men and they lost 14 out of 15 officers. (Note: There is a bit of controversy in the scene in Gods and Generals where the Rebel Irish units from Savannah yell to the 69th. There are no first source records of this happening and it seems to be a possible fabrication during the reconciliations at reunions at the turn of the 19th and 20th centuries.) The day after the battle, the 69th was issued its famed "2nd Colors", one set of which was later given to the Oireachtas by John F. Kennedy on the centennial of the battle.

After Chancellorsville, only 300 men remained in the regiment. General Meagher resigned as commander of the Irish Brigade, stating that "the brigade ceased to exist." The 69th's commander, Patrick Kelly was named as the new commander of the brigade.

At Gettysburg the regiment, vastly outnumbered, held the Wheatfield until it was overwhelmed. At the Wheatfield, using their smooth-bore muskets loaded with buck and ball and advancing rapidly, they were initially able to drive Confederate forces back. Other Confederates were advancing, however, and maneuvered around the flanks of the Irish Brigade. Receiving devastating fire on two sides, they were forced to withdraw. Out of 75 men in the regiment that entered this fight, five were killed in action, 14 were wounded, and six were listed as missing.

=== Petersburg and Appomattox ===
Following Gettysburg, the Irish Brigade ceased to exist as a functioning unit and was disbanded in June 1864. The depleted ranks of the 69th Regiment were filled with new volunteers and draftees from New York's Irish ghettoes. At the end of the summer of 1864, the 69th rejoined its Irish comrades as 1st Regiment of the 2nd Irish Brigade. The brigade served until the end of the war and was present at the surrender of General Lee at Appomattox. Out of more than 2,000 regiments that served with the Union Army, the 69th lost more men than all but six.

=== Return and reconstitution ===
The regiment marched in the Washington, D.C. victory parade and returned to New York. All the regiments of the Irish Brigade were disbanded except the 69th, which remained part of the New York National Guard. The 69th remained a place of unity and culture for Irish Americans in the post-war years. It was called into active service in 1898 for the Spanish–American War, transported to Chickamauga, Georgia, Tampa, Florida, and Huntsville, Alabama, but it did not see combat due to the brevity of that war. In 1916, the regiment was posted to McAllen, Texas, along the Mexican border during the Punitive expedition.

=== Officers of the 69th ===
Officers as of 1 November 1861:

Snr. Staff.

Col. Robert Nugent (Commanding Officer)

Lt. Col. James Kelly (Second in Command)

Maj. James Cavanagh

Adj. James J. Smith

QM. Dennis F. Sullivan

Surgeon J. Pascal Smith

Asst. Surgeon James A. Reed

Chaplain Thomas Willet

Company Commanders

A Company, Cpt. James Saunders

B Company, Cpt. Thomas Leddy

C Company, Cpt. Jasper Whitty

D Company, Cpt. Timothy L. Shanley

E Company, Cpt. William Benson

F Company, Cpt. James E. McGee

G Company, Cpt. Felix Duffy

H Company, Cpt. James Lourey

I Company, Cpt. Thomas Scanlins

K Company, Cpt. J. P. McMahon

== World War I ==
42nd Infantry Division shoulder sleeve insignia.

Upon the entry of the United States into World War I, all National Guard infantry regiments received new numerical designation from 101 to 300, and the 69th was renumbered the 165th Infantry Regiment. Doubled in size by new War Department regulations, its ranks were filled with Irish-Americans and New Yorkers detailed from other regiments. After brief training at Camp Mills, Long Island, NY, the regiment was sent to the Western Front in October 1917 as part of the 42nd "Rainbow" Division in the American Expeditionary Force (AEF) that was commanded by General John J. Pershing. The 69th still retained its Irish symbolism and spirit, and every member since then has been designated an honorary Irishman. As Father Duffy described non-Irish who join the regiment, "They are Irish by adoption, Irish by association, or Irish by conviction".

=== Commanders ===
Wartime commanders of the 165th Infantry included:

- Col. Charles DeLano Hine
- Col. John William Barker
- Col. Frank Ross McCoy
- Col. Harry D. Mitchell
- Col. Charles A. Dravo
- Col. William J. Donovan
- Col. Charles R. Howland

=== Rouge Bouquet ===
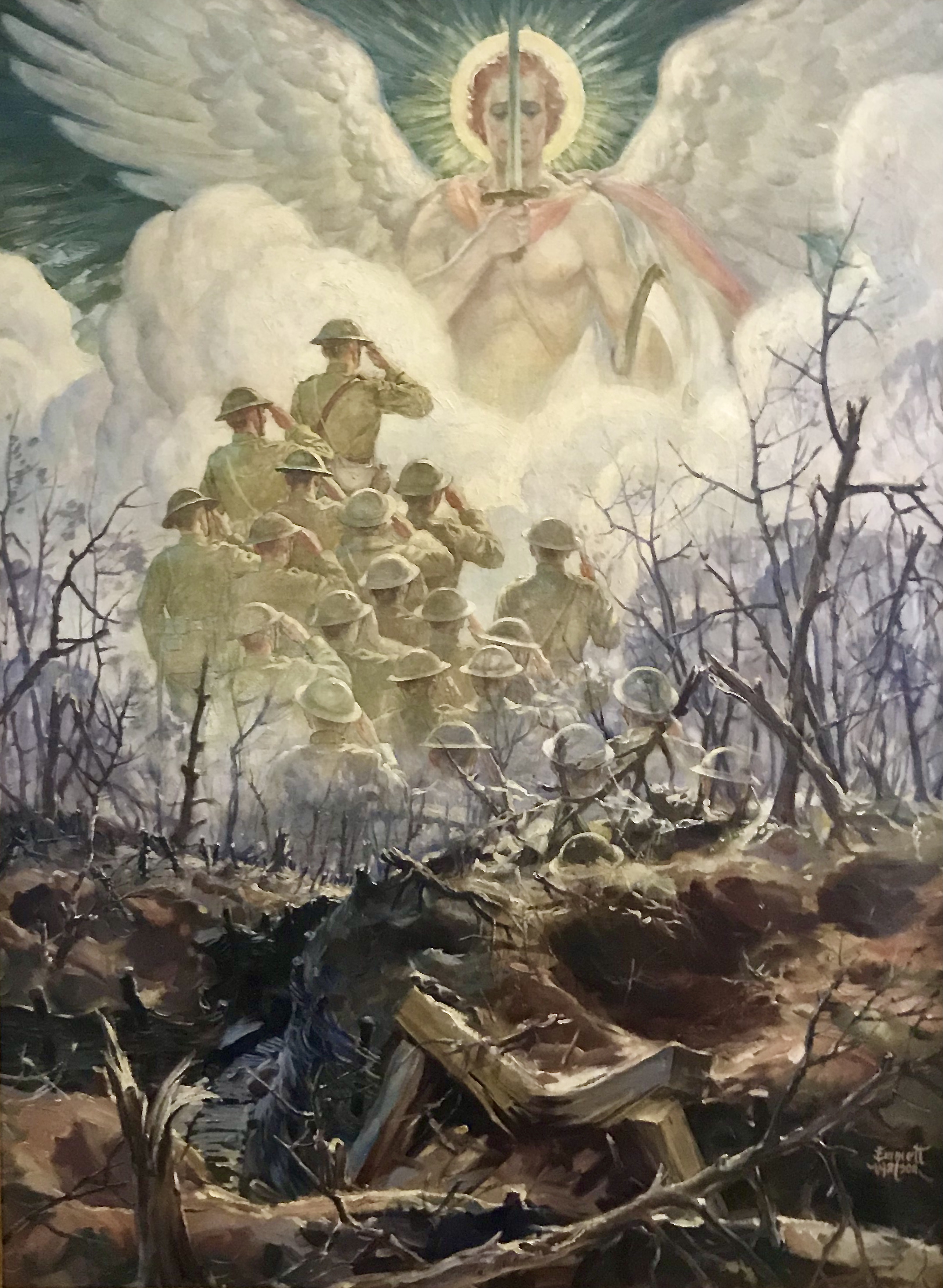
"Rouge Bouquet" by Emmett Watson.

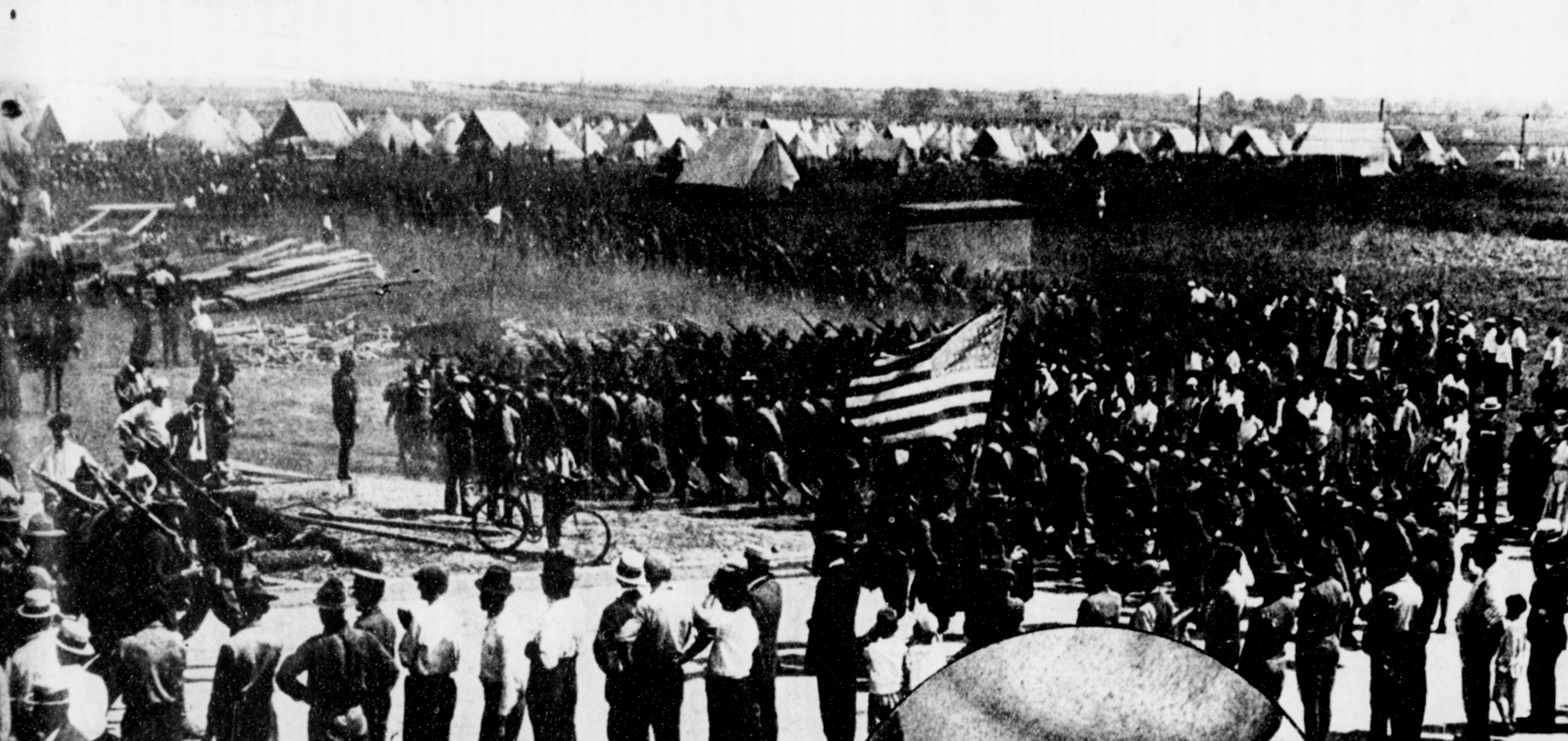
The fighting 69th at training camp shortly before deployment.

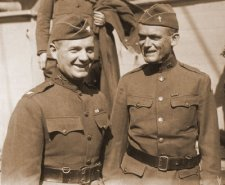
Colonel Donovan & Father Duffy upon return from France in 1919.

Arriving in France in November 1917, the regiment first engaged in training near Valcouleurs and Grand. It then undertook a legendary muddy 80-mile march just after Christmas through the Vosges mountains to Longeau and Luneville. It had its first combat experience on 26 February 1918 in the nearby trenches of the Rouge Bouquet Chaussilles Sector in the Foret de Parroy near the village of Baccarat. While there, it suffered its first combat casualties, including the deaths of 21 men from the 2nd Battalion on 7 March when a dugout collapsed under bombardment. This event was memorialized in Sergeant Joyce Kilmer's poem "Rouge Bouquet" and by a painting of the same name by Emmett Watson.

=== Champagne ===
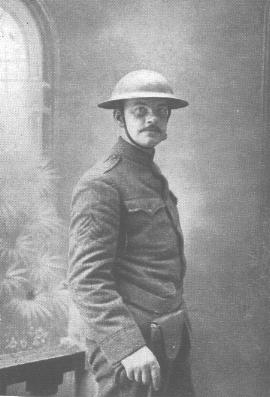
Sergeant Joyce Kilmer, 1918

RMS Titanic survivor Daniel Buckley, KIA 1918.

After participating in numerous raids into German territory and suffering significant casualties from mustard gas attacks, the regiment was placed in reserve in the Baccarat sector. On 18 June, it moved to the Champagne sector near St. Hillaire. There, it and the rest of the Rainbow Division stopped the German advance in the Second Battle of the Marne that began on 14 July.

=== Château-Thierry ===
On 24 July, the 42nd Division moved to Chateau Thierry to relieve the embattled U.S. 26th Division. The Fighting 69th led with distinction the crossing of the Ourcq River 28–31 July, but suffering 264 KIA (including poet Sergeant Joyce Kilmer), 150 MIA, and 1,200 WIA out of the 3,000-man regiment in four days fighting. Having broken the German lines, who were now reluctantly retreating, the 84th Brigade commander, Brigadier General Douglas MacArthur, was looking to press forward. When informed that the other regiments had replied that they were "too fatigued" but that the decimated 69th replied that it would still "consider an order to advance as a compliment", he exclaimed, "By God, it takes the Irish when you want a hard thing done!"

=== St. Mihiel ===
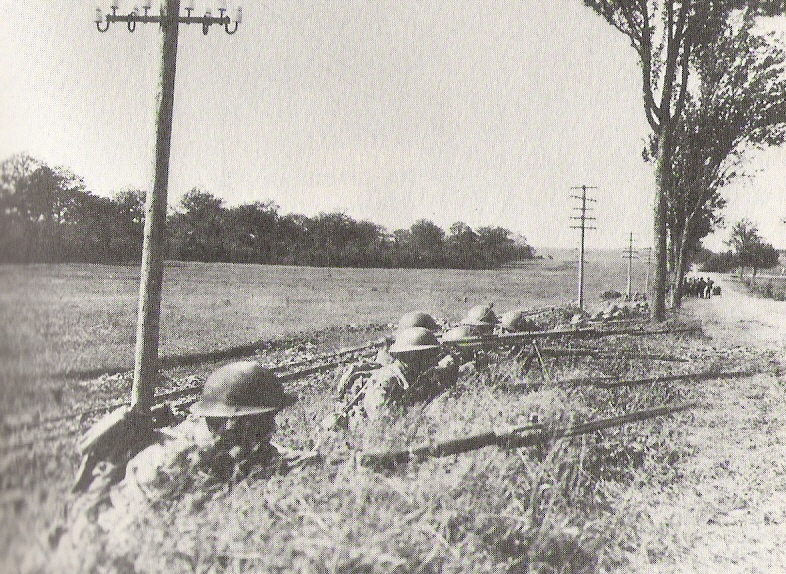
Company B of the 69th dug in at Hassavant Farm, their last objective in St. Mihiel, September 1918.

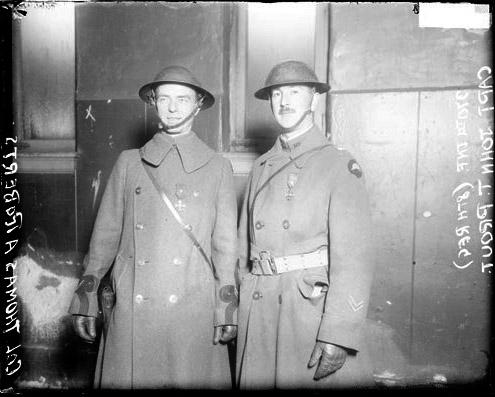
Captain John T. Prout at right 1919

After Chateau Thiery, the regiment refitted. Replacements from all over the United States arrived, becoming about 65 percent of the regiment's enlisted men and nearly 75 percent of the officers. Meanwhile, General Pershing, commander of the AEF on the Western Front, had finally amassed enough troops to form an autonomous American field army. Its first battle would be to pinch off the St. Mihiel salient. The Rainbow Division with the Fighting 69th would participate from the right side pressing northwest from Beaumont assisted by Lieutenant Colonel George Patton's 1st Provisional Tank Brigade, (later redesignated the 304th Tank Brigade). Many days of marches through the rain brought the 69th to the jump-off point by 10 September, but the rain delayed the start to 12 September. The Germans sensed the build-up and were in the process of withdrawing, so resistance was light. The regiment captured thousands of Germans in open field fighting while suffering 47 KIA and reached its objective of St. Benoit on 15 September.

=== Meuse-Argonne ===
Its final exploits came when the 42nd Division relieved the 1st Infantry Division during the 3rd phase of the Meuse-Argonne offensive. Attacking against a well-entrenched enemy in terrible terrain without support from units on its flanks, the regiment suffered heavy casualties while moving forward and captured Hill 252 overlooking the Meuse River on 7 November. Once again, it was the tip of the spear of the American First Army. The war ended four days later with the signing of the Armistice, but the 69th then served as occupation troops in Remagen before returning to New York in the spring of 1919.

=== Return & recognition ===
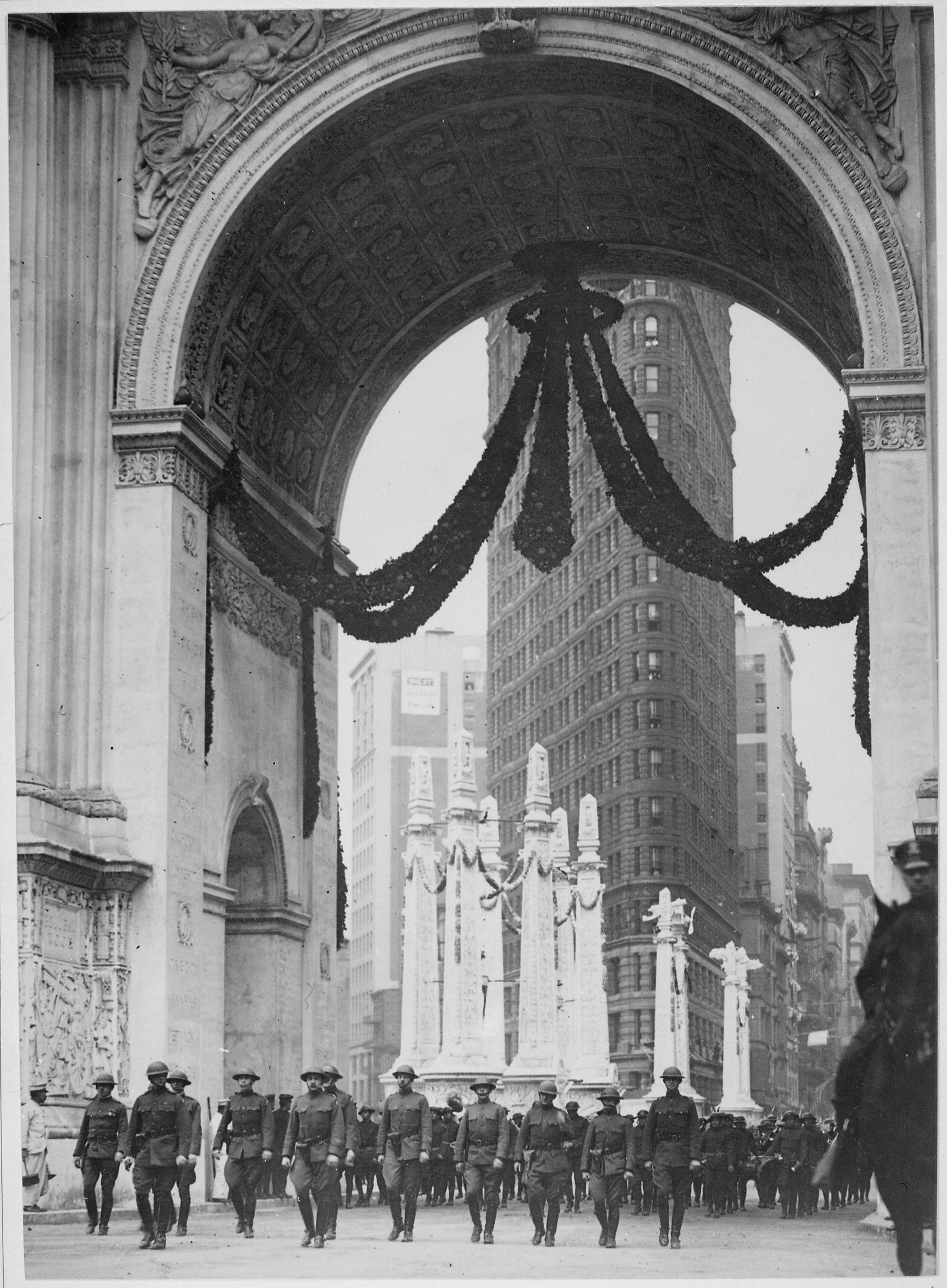
Colonel Donovan and the Fighting 69th pass under the Victory Arch in New York City in 1919.

Upon the return from France, Colonel Donovan remarked that "The morale of the regiment has never been better than it is today. Formerly 85 percent of its strength were of Irish descent, and now it is only 50 percent, but the spirit of the old Fighting 69th is stronger than ever. The replacements, whether they are Jews, Italians, or other foreign descent, are more Irish now than the Irish!". He also later pointed out that at one point during the Argonne battle, the adjutants of all three battalions were Jews, one lieutenant was born in Germany, and another lieutenant was a full-blooded Choctaw from Oklahoma.

During World War I, total casualties of the regiment amounted to 644 killed in action and 2,587 wounded (200 of whom would later die of their wounds) during 164 days of front-line combat. One member of the regiment killed in World War I was Daniel Buckley who survived the sinking of the RMS Titanic in 1912. Sixty members earned the Distinguished Service Cross and three of its members were awarded the Medal of Honor, including its famed 1st Battalion and later regimental commander, William Joseph Donovan. Colonel Donovan went on to organize the Office of Strategic Services (OSS) in World War II, retiring as a major general. In February 2022 the unknown remains of a member of the 165th Infantry Regiment were unearthed at Villers-sur-Fère, France cemetery; he was reburied 7 June 2023 at Oise-Aisne American Cemetery

It also produced Father Francis Duffy, "The Fighting Chaplain". In France, Duffy was always seen in the thick of battle, assisting the litter bearers in recovering the wounded, administering last rites, burying the dead, and encouraging the men, while unarmed, and at great risk to his own life. His bravery and inspired leadership were so great that at one point the brigade commander, Brigadier General Michael Joseph Lenihan, even briefly considered making him the regimental commander, an unheard-of role for a chaplain.

With the New York National Guard federalized during the war, a new state force, the New York Guard, was organized in 1917 in order to have militia troops available if needed by the Governor of New York under the New York State Constitution. As part of this, a replacement 69th Infantry Regiment was created. On 7 January 1921, the 165th Infantry Regiment was consolidated with the 69th Infantry of the New York Guard and reorganized as the 69th Infantry Regiment, New York National Guard.

== Interwar period ==
The 165th Infantry arrived at the port of New York on the USS Harrisburg and was demobilized at Camp Upton, New York on 7 May 1919. The 165th Infantry was reconstituted in the National Guard on 30 December 1920, allotted to the state of New York, and concurrently relieved from assignment to the 42nd Division and assigned to the 44th Division. The 165th Infantry Regiment was reorganized on 11 December 1921 by the redesignation of the 69th Infantry Regiment, New York National Guard (organized 7 January 1921). On 27 February 1927, it was relieved from assignment to the 44th Division and assigned to the separate 93rd Infantry Brigade. On 20 June 1940, the regiment was relieved from assignment to the 93rd Infantry Brigade and assigned to the 54th Infantry Brigade, 27th Division, replacing the 107th Infantry Regiment that departed the latter brigade after conversion into an antiaircraft unit.

== World War II ==
27th Infantry Division shoulder sleeve insignia

During World War II, the regiment again served with distinction. It was federalized on 15 October 1940. It was first sent to Alabama and Louisiana for training. One week after Pearl Harbor, it was sent to Inglewood, California, to assist in defense of the West Coast. Beginning in January 1942, the regiment made its way to Hawaii via Fort Ord and San Francisco.

=== Makin Island ===
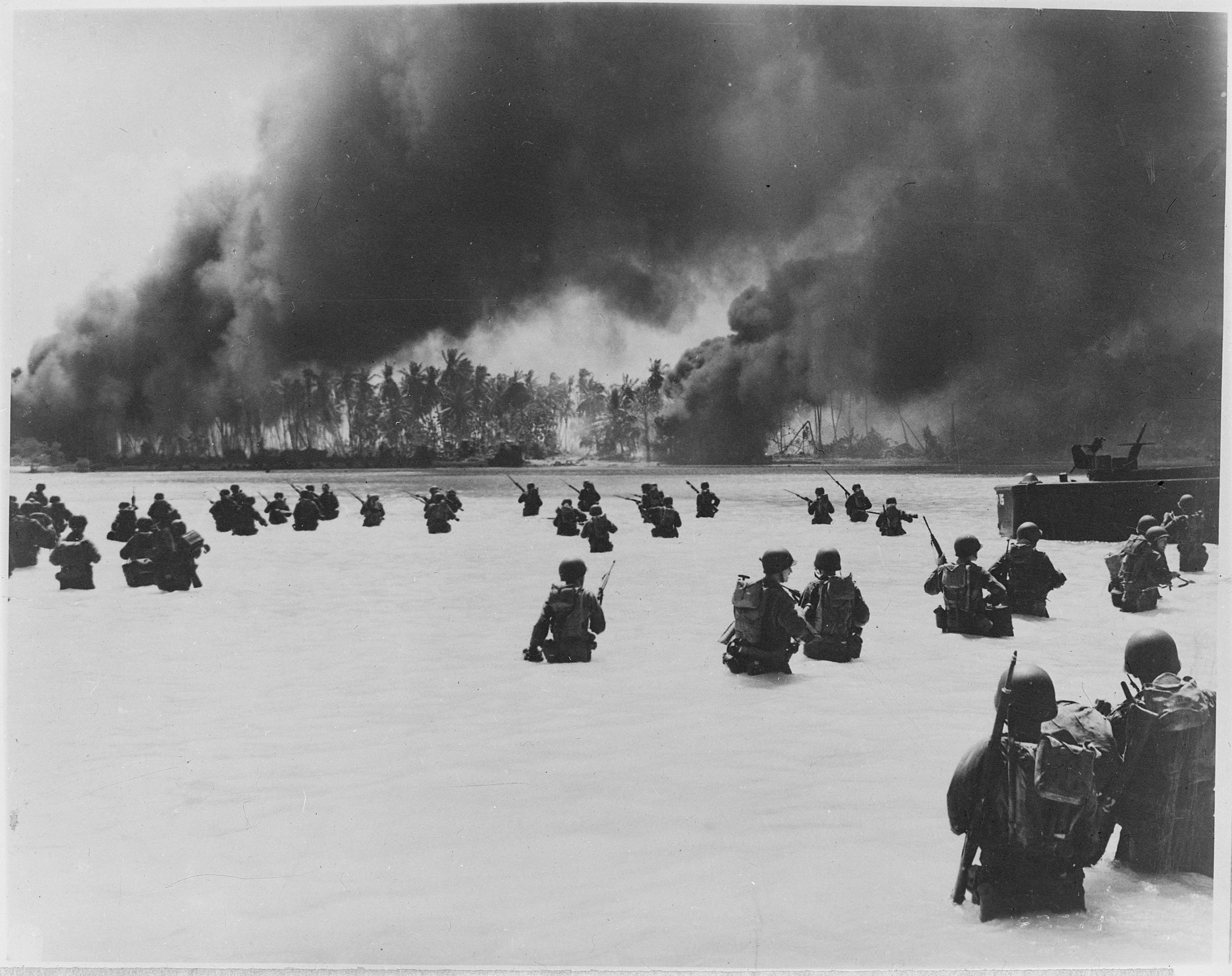
2nd Battalion, 165th Infantry landing during Battle of Makin Island

First assigned to island defense in Kauai, they were recalled to Oahu in October to begin training for 20 November 1943 landings on Butaritari Island of Makin Atoll, part of the Gilbert Islands. There it was supplemented with artillery and armor to become the 165th Regimental Combat Team. The regiment's first and third infantry battalions would land on the western ("Red") Beach, which was expected to be the most heavily defended, and the second battalion would land on the Northern ("Yellow") beach to trap the defenders from behind. The Japanese kept their forces near the northern beach, so resistance on Red beach was minimal. Despite this, Col Gardiner Conroy, commander of the regiment, was killed there as he directed tanks to support the infantrymen. The second battalion landings were more difficult due to the enemy presence and the need to wade in from 250 yards out due to the limitations of the Higgins boats in the shallow water, but by noon the beach was secure. On 21 November, the regiment secured Butaritari Village and endured a Banzai charge that night. The regiment continued to sweep across the island and by mid-morning on 23 November, the signal "Makin Taken" was sent.

Writer and Army historian S.L.A. Marshall was attached to the 27th Infantry Division for the beachhead assault on Makin Island. He was studying soldiers under combat and followed a battalion on the beach; possibly from the 69th (then 165th). His alleged experience may give insight into the extreme heat and physical exhaustion.

=== Saipan ===
For the invasion of Saipan, the 27th Division served as a floating reserve. The Marines landed on 15 June 1944 but suffered large casualties, so the Fighting 69th was the first army unit ashore when it led the reinforcement landing at 1:17 am on 17 June. By nightfall, despite heavy opposition, the second battalion reached Aslito Airfield, while the first battalion fought for control of the ridge between the airfield and Cape Obian. The airfield was captured the next day, and the regiment began clearing operations toward Nafutan Point. The regiment was then redeployed to clear out "Purple Heart Ridge" on 23 June and accomplished that by the 27th despite heavy flanking fire. It next helped clear Hill Able and Hill King in "Death Valley" and advanced to Tanapag Harbor on the west coast of the island by 4 July. On 6 July, the assault continued onto Tanapag Plain. On 7 July it attacked Makunsha and secured it by 8 July. The island was declared secured on 9 July, although isolated resistance continued for a year. During the months of July and August, the regiment cleaned out isolated pockets in the mountains and cliffs of Saipan. Beginning in the middle of August, the unit moved to the New Hebrides for rest and rehabilitation. On 25 March 1945, the 27th Division sailed from Espiritu Santo, arriving at Okinawa, 9 April 1945.

=== Okinawa ===
At Okinawa, landings were made on the west coast in the vicinity of Kadena airfield on 1 April 1945, with the Marine 1st and 6th Divisions sweeping northeast and the Army 7th Division moving south along the eastern coast and the 96th Division moving south down the center of the island. The Fighting 69th as part of the 27th Division again served as a floating reserve. The Marines encountered little resistance and the two Army divisions moved rapidly south until they ran headlong into the previously unknown and very strong Manchinato line on 6 April. When they were repulsed with heavy casualties, the 27th Division was added to their right flank along the west coast to be part of a coordinated assault that began on 19 April. The Fighting 69th formed the right side of the division and corps line along the western coast and fought its way south.

The terrain and defense were formidable. Numerous ridges, tunnels, and prepared pillboxes were used by the enemy in a tenacious defense. It took heavy and continuous fighting by the two battalions until 26 April to secure the Manchinato Airfield. During this engagement, the actions of F Company in overcoming obstacles while extremely outnumbered and cut-off resulted in a Distinguished Unit Citation and its being written up as a staff study on small unit effectiveness. Sgt. (then Pfc.) Alejandro R. Ruiz was awarded the Medal of Honor for actions while serving with A Company on the ridge.

Following the assault and capture of this key defensive line, the exhausted XXIV Army Corps was relieved on 1 May by the two Marine divisions and the 77th and 7th Infantry Divisions for the next assault southward. The 27th Division with the Fighting Sixty-Ninth then assumed the duties of the two Marine Divisions in securing the relatively calmer north end of the island. The enemy fought bitterly on Onnatake Hill from 23 May until 2 June, before losing the strong point. After a mopping-up period, the division left Okinawa, 7 September 1945, moved to Japan and occupation duties in Niigata and Fukushima Prefectures.

In all, the regiment suffered 472 killed in action during its service in the Second World War.

== The Cold War ==
Like most National Guard units, the regiment was not called up for Korea or Vietnam but continued the traditional National Guard role of assisting in disasters and disturbances at home. Realignments saw it once again returned to the 42nd Rainbow Division in 1947. In the 1960s while playing for the New York Knicks, Cazzie Russell was a member of the regiment and wrote a sports column for the regimental newspaper. In March 1970, the regiment was called to federal service for one week to assist during the federal mail strike as part of Operation Graphic Hand. From 1993 to 1996, the regiment became the 69th Air Defense Artillery Regiment. After protests from the unit and its veterans, it returned to its traditional infantry roots and its original regimental number in 1997.

== Global War on Terror ==
=== Operation Noble Eagle ===
From its armory at Lexington Avenue and 25th Street in midtown Manhattan, the 69th was one of the first military units to respond to the attack on the World Trade Center on September 11, 2001, where it helped to secure Ground Zero. Most of the men who served that day had reported in to their units voluntarily, without formal orders. Two members were killed during rescue operations on the morning of 11 September, 1st Lieutenant Gerard Baptiste (FDNY) & Specialist Thomas Jurgens (NYS Courts). Following duty at the WTC, 200 soldiers were mobilized to protect the United States Military Academy, West Point, serving for one year. Numerous other members were on active duty protecting nuclear power plants, airports, bridges, tunnels, and trains throughout the New York area as part of Operation Noble Eagle

=== Operation Iraqi Freedom ===
On 15 May 2004, the regiment was federalized for combat duty in Operation Iraqi Freedom, training at Fort Hood, Texas, and Fort Irwin, California, before deploying. The Fighting 69th deployed to Iraq as a battalion under the command of Lieutenant Colonel Geoffrey Slack and Command Sergeant Major George Brett, the first time it had seen overseas combat since World War II.

==== Taji ====
The regiment performed combat patrols in Taji, Radwiniyah, and Baghdad. The regiment helped suppress rocket and mortar attacks upon the Green Zone and Camp Cooke. A local sheik in Taji assumed the 69th's curved Rainbow Division insignia was a Special Forces patch because of their aggressiveness, but Lt. Col. Slack explained to him that it "meant they were from New York and eager to avenge the 9/11 attacks".

==== Baghdad ====
While in Baghdad, the regiment was responsible for finally securing the infamous "Route Irish" (the airport road) that linked the "Green Zone" to BIAP airfield, Camp Victory, and the surrounding neighborhoods including al-Ameriyah. 19 members of the regiment were killed in action, and over 78 were wounded in action during "Operation Wolfhound", named after the Irish Wolfhounds on its regimental crest, before it returned to New York on 15 September 2005.

The March 2006 New York City St. Patrick's Day Parade was dedicated to honoring the service of The Fighting 69th. On 13 March 2008 the House of Representatives passed House Resolution 991 (H.Res.991) recognizing the 69th Infantry. The resolution was sponsored by Rep. Steve Israel (D-NY), and passed unanimously.

=== Operation Enduring Freedom ===
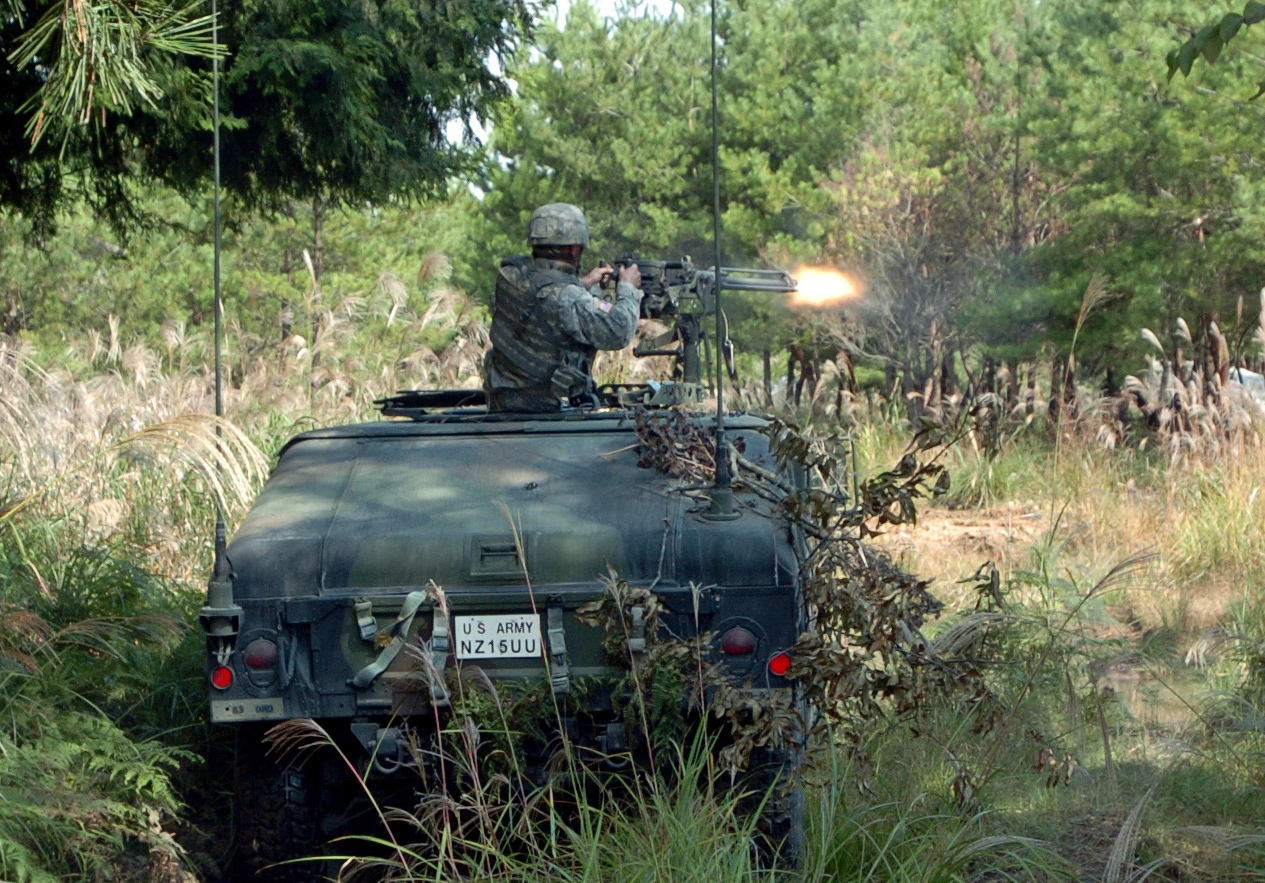
69th Infantry in Japan as part of Operation Orient Shield

In 2008, approximately 300 soldiers from the 69th volunteered for assignment to the 27th Infantry Brigade Combat Team to assist and train the Afghan security forces. Before returning to New York in the summer of 2009, the regimental volunteers suffered four killed in action.

In 2012, elements of the regiment volunteered for attachment to 27th IBCT once more, part of the then regular rotation of reserve component mobilizations. Charlie Company was reflagged as Bravo Company, 2nd Battalion of the 108th Infantry Regiment; serving in Shindand, and Herat, Afghanistan. Other regimental volunteers joined with the 427th BSB throughout Kuwait and RC South.

Since standing down from federal service and returning to New York, the regiment's activities have included annual infantry training and qualification at Fort A.P. Hill, Urban warfare training at Fort Knox, providing combat experience briefings to cadets at the United States Military Academy, and sending companies for joint training in Puerto Rico, Canada, to Japan as part of Operation Orient Shield, to Thailand as part of Operation Cobra Gold, and to Fort Polk, Louisiana, for JRTC. Most recently the battalion trained in to Australia during Operation Talisman Sabre 17.

=== Horn of Africa ===
In June 2022, the battalion mobilized for a deployment overseas to East Africa. After training at Fort Drum, NY, the unit, dubbed Task Force Wolfhound, began mobilization training at Fort Bliss, TX. Following three months of training at Fort Bliss, the unit deployed to Africa. While in Africa, Task Force Wolfhound was assigned to Combined Joint Task Force – Horn of Africa and tasked with securing U.S. installations in Djibouti, Kenya, and Somalia.

In addition to conventional security operations, the task force was responsible for manning the East Africa Response Force, or EARF. Created in the wake of the 2012 Benghazi attack, the EARF stands ready to rapidly respond to crises throughout Africa and safeguard U.S. interests.

== Tributes ==
=== General Robert E. Lee, CSA ===
Describing the assault on Marye's Heights at the Battle of Fredericksburg, opposing General Robert E. Lee wrote:

Never were men so brave. They ennobled their race by their gallantry on that desperate occasion. Though totally routed, they reaped harvests of glory. Their brilliant though hopeless assaults on our lines excited the hearty applause of our officers and men.

=== General George Pickett, CSA ===
Your soldier's heart almost stood still as he watched those sons of Erin fearlessly rush to their death. The brilliant assault on Marye's Heights of their Irish Brigade was beyond description. Why, my darling, we forgot they were fighting us, and cheer after cheer at their fearlessness went up all along our lines."

=== General Douglas MacArthur ===
General Douglas MacArthur gave the following address to members and veterans of the 69th at the Waldorf-Astoria Hotel in New York City via short-wave radio from Manila in the Philippines, on 24 January 1940:

No greater fighting regiment has ever existed than the One Hundred and Sixty-fifth Infantry of the Rainbow Division, formed from the old Sixty-ninth Regiment of New York. I cannot tell you how real and how sincere a pleasure I feel tonight in once more addressing the members of that famous unit. You need no eulogy from me or from any other man. You have written your own history and written it in red on your enemies' breast, but when I think of your patience under adversity, your courage under fire, and your modesty in victory, I am filled with an emotion of admiration I cannot express. You have carved your own statue upon the hearts of your people, you have built your own monument in the memory of your compatriots.

One of the most outstanding characteristics of the regiment was its deep sense of religious responsibility, inculcated by one of my most beloved friends—Father Duffy. He gave you a code that embraces the highest moral laws, that will stand the test of any ethics or philosophies ever promulgated for the uplift of man. Its requirements are for the things that are right and its restraints are from the things that are wrong.

The soldier, above all men, is required to perform the highest act of religious teaching—sacrifice. However horrible the results of war may be, the soldier who is called upon to offer and perchance to give his life for his country is the noblest development of mankind. No physical courage and no brute instincts can take the place of the divine annunciation and spiritual uplift which will alone sustain him. Father Duffy, on those bloody fields of France we all remember so well, taught the men of your regiment how to die that a nation might live—how to die unquestioning and uncomplaining, with faith in their hearts and the hope on their lips that we might go on to victory.

Somewhere in your banquet hall tonight his noble spirit looks down to bless and guide you young soldiers on the narrow path marked with West Point's famous motto—duty, honor, country.

We'll hope that war will come to us no more. But if its red stream again engulf us, I want you to know that if my flag flies again, I shall hope to have you once more with me, once more to form the brilliant hues of what is lovingly, reverently called by men at arms, the Rainbow.

May God be with you until we meet again.

=== President John F. Kennedy ===
President John Fitzgerald Kennedy opened his address to Irish Parliament on 28 June 1963 with a tribute to the gallantry of the Fighting 69th:

The 13th day of December, 1862, will be a day long remembered in American history. At Fredericksburg, Virginia, thousands of men fought and died on one of the bloodiest battlefields of the American Civil War. One of the most brilliant stories of that day was written by a band of 1200 men who went into battle wearing a green sprig in their hats. They bore a proud heritage and a special courage, given to those who had long fought for the cause of freedom. I am referring, of course, to the Irish Brigade. General Robert E. Lee, the great military leader of the Southern Confederate Forces, said of this group of men after the battle, "The gallant stand which this bold brigade made on the heights of Fredericksburg is well known. Never were men so brave. They ennobled their race by their splendid gallantry on that desperate occasion. Their brilliant though hopeless assaults on our lines excited the hearty applause of our officers and soldiers." Of the 1200 men who took part in that assault, 280 survived the battle. The Irish Brigade was led into battle on that occasion by Brig. Gen. Thomas F. Meagher, who had participated in the unsuccessful Irish uprising of 1848, was captured by the British and sent in a prison ship to Australia from whence he finally came to America. In the fall of 1862, after serving with distinction and gallantry in some of the toughest fighting of this most bloody struggle, the Irish Brigade was presented with a new set of flags. In the city ceremony, the city chamberlain gave them the motto, "The Union, our Country, and Ireland forever." Their old ones having been torn to shreds in previous battles, Capt. Richard McGee took possession of these flags on December 2nd in New York City and arrived with them at the Battle of Fredericksburg and carried them in the battle. Today, in recognition of what these gallant Irishmen and what millions of other Irish have done for my country, and through the generosity of the "Fighting 69th," I would like to present one of these flags to the people of Ireland.

The flag presented by Kennedy is displayed in Leinster House, Dublin.

=== Ireland memorial ===
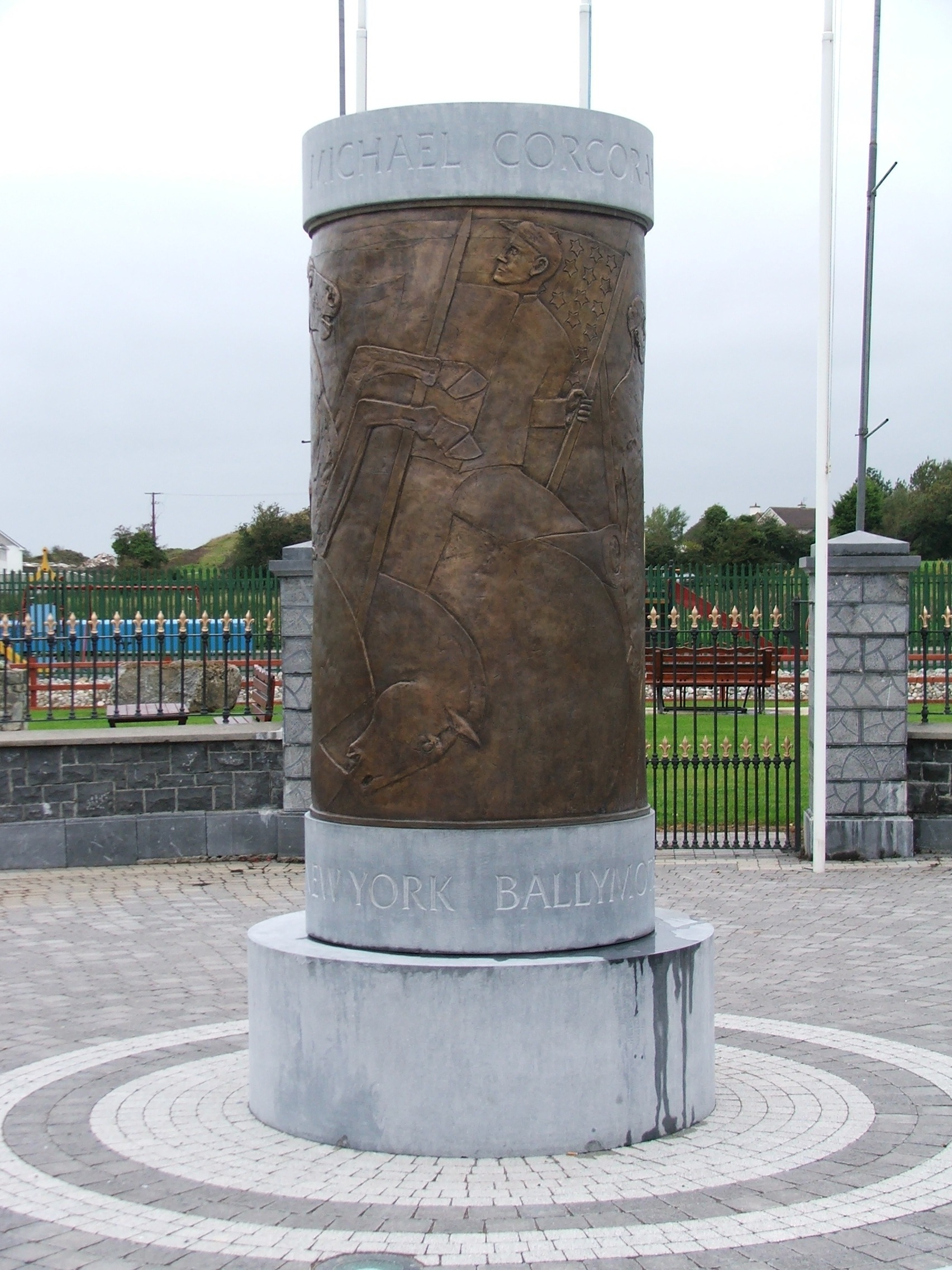
Memorial to the 69th in Ballymote, Ireland

Michael Bloomberg, the Mayor of New York City, unveiled Ireland's national monument to the Fighting 69th on 22 August 2006 at Ballymote, County Sligo, the birthplace of Brigadier General Michael Corcoran The monument is a bronze column inscribed with scenes of Corcoran's life. Beside the gray, stone base is a small chamber set flush with the ground that contains a piece of steel from the World Trade Center donated by the parents of firefighter Michael Lynch, who perished in the attack.

In his remarks that day, Bloomberg said:

Brigadier General Michael Corcoran became one of the Civil War's most revered heroes. When he returned to New York City after months of captivity in the South, enormous crowds thronged him in a parade up Broadway to New York's City Hall. When he died, his body lay in state in our City Hall – just down the corridor from my desk – and people came from far and wide to pay their last respects. His successor as commander of the 69th was a fellow Irishman, the legendary Thomas Francis Meagher. At Meagher's funeral mass in New York City, his eulogist said: "Never forget this: he gave all, lost all for the land of his birth. He risked all for the land of his adoption, was her true and loyal soldier, and in the end died in her service." So it could be said for much of the Irish Brigade. And although the 69th suffered terrible casualties in the Civil War, its tradition of valor – and its connection to Ireland – lived on. When the Fighting 69th was re-activated for World War I, about 95% of the men who joined the regiment were Irish. Their chaplain, Father Francis Duffy, said the rest of the men were "Irish by adoption, Irish by association, or Irish by conviction." Today, the 69th is as diverse as New York City itself – but Father Duffy's words still hold true.

In a follow-up to this visit, Mayor Bloomberg invited members of the 58th Reserve Infantry Battalion of the Irish Defence Forces to parade in New York City on St. Patrick's Day. The battalion visited for the 2010 and 2011 parades.

=== Other memorials and gravesites ===
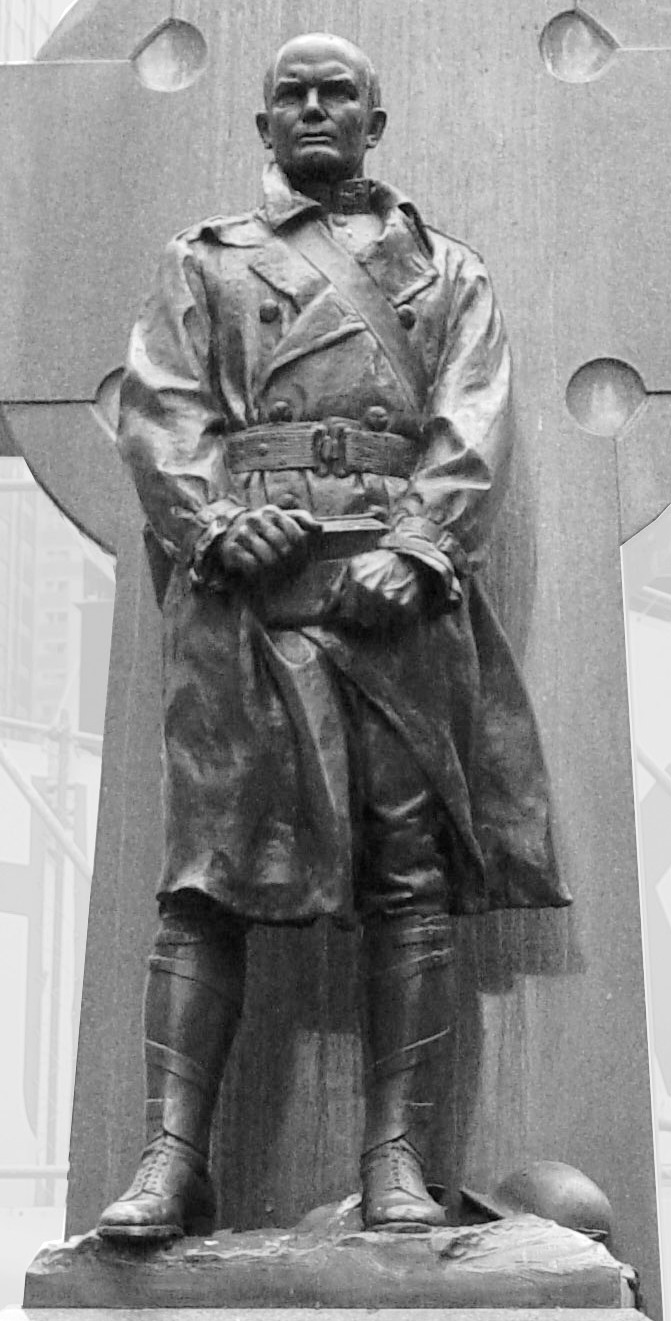
Statue of Francis P. Duffy in Duffy Square, in Times Square, NYC

Memorials to the Fighting 69th may be found at Antietam, Fredericksburg, Gettysburg, and other Civil War battlefields. Two memorials to the regiment and its dead as well as the graves of Colonels Mathew Murray, Michael Corcoran, Patrick Kelly, and Richard Byrnes may be found in Calvary Cemetery in Woodside Queens, NY. This cemetery also contains the Cavalry Monument, honoring the regiment. A statue of Thomas Francis Meagher may be found in Helena, Montana, where he had later served as Governor.

Joyce Kilmer and other men of the Sixty-Ninth are interred at the Oise-Aisne American Cemetery and Memorial in France. Father Duffy is memorialized in a statue at the north end of Times Square, which is technically "Duffy Square". World War II's Camp Kilmer was named for Sgt. Joyce Kilmer. Colonel William Donovan is buried at Arlington National Cemetery.

== Medal of Honor citations ==
Seven members of the 69th Regiment have been awarded the Medal of Honor. Not only is this a high number for a National Guard regiment, but all survived the actions for which they were awarded.

=== Peter Rafferty ===
Rank and organization: Private, Company B, 69th New York Infantry. Place and date: At Malvern Hill, Va., 1 July 1862. Entered service at: New York, N.Y. Birth: Ireland. Date of issue: 2 August 1897.

Citation: Having been wounded and directed to the rear, declined to go, but continued in action, receiving several additional wounds, which resulted in his capture by the enemy and his total disability for military service.

=== Timothy Donoghue ===
Rank and organization: Private, Company B, 69th New York Infantry. Place and date: At Fredericksburg, Va., 13 December 1862. Entered service at:------. Birth: Ireland. Date of issue: 17 January 1894.

Citation: Voluntarily carried a wounded officer off the field from between the lines; while doing this he was himself wounded.

=== Joseph Keele ===
Rank and organization: Sergeant Major, 182d New York Infantry. Place and date: At North Anna River, Va., 23 May 1864. Entered service at: Staten Island, N.Y. Birth: Ireland. Date of issue: 25 October 1867.

Citation: Voluntarily and at the risk of his life carried orders to the brigade commander, which resulted in saving the works his regiment was defending.

=== Michael A. Donaldson ===
Rank and organization: Sergeant, U.S. Army, Company I, 165th Infantry, 42d Division. Place and date: At Sommerance-Landres-et St. Georges Road, France, 14 October 1918. Entered service at: Haverstraw, N.Y. Born: 1884, Haverstraw, N.Y. G.O. No.: 9, W.D., 1923.

Citation: The advance of his regiment having been checked by intense machine gun fire of the enemy, who were entrenched on the crest of a hill before Landres-et St. Georges, his company retired to a sunken road to reorganize their position, leaving several of their number wounded near the enemy lines. Of his own volition, in broad daylight and under direct observation of the enemy and with utter disregard for his own safety, he advanced to the crest of the hill, rescued one of his wounded comrades, and returned under withering fire to his own lines, repeating his splendidly heroic act until he had brought in all 6 men.

=== William Joseph Donovan ===
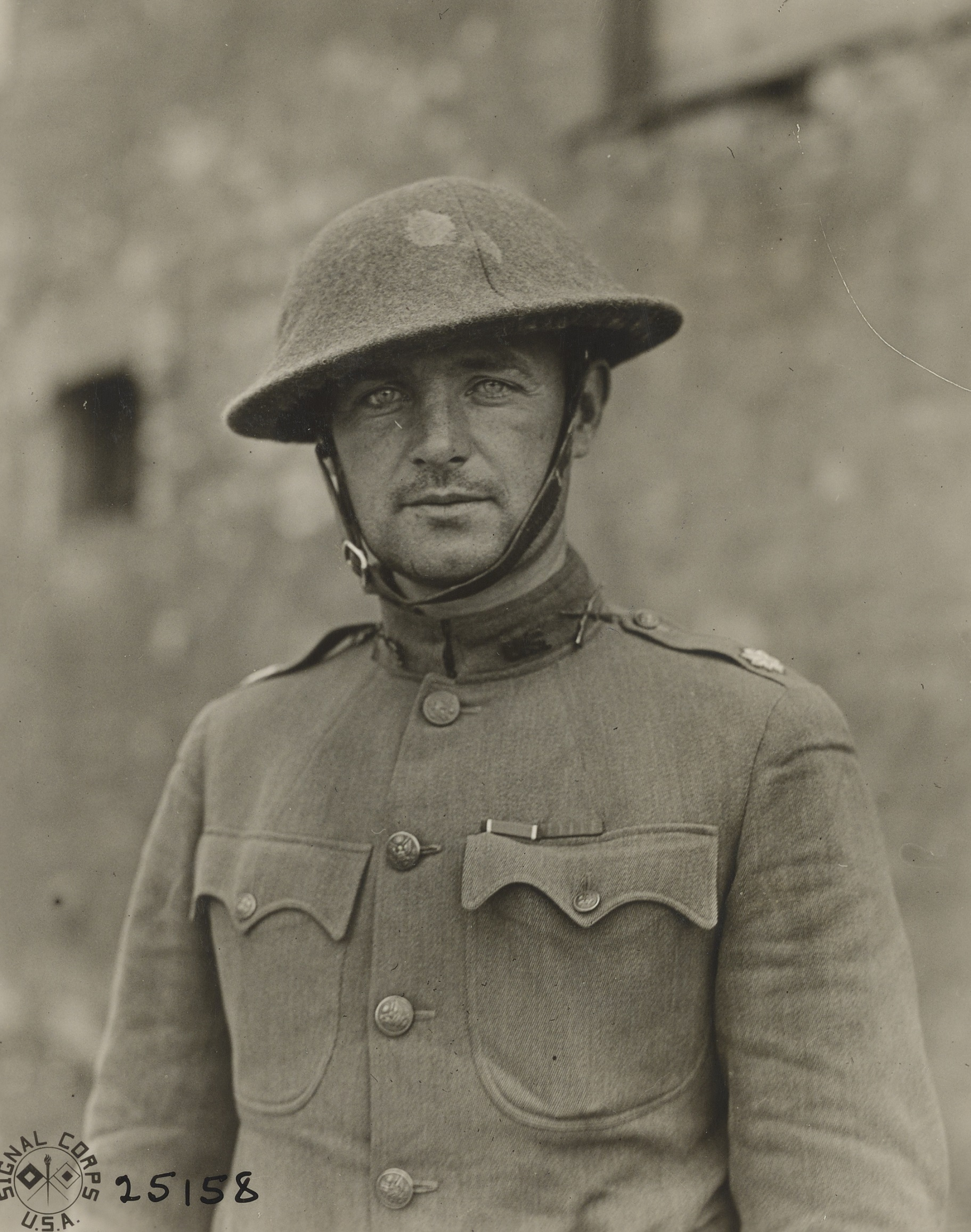
William Joseph "Wild Bill" Donovan as a major in France in 1918

Rank and organization: Lieutenant Colonel, U.S. Army, 165th Infantry, 42d Division. Place and date: Near Landres-et-St. Georges, France, 14–15 October 1918. Entered service at: Buffalo, N.Y. Born: 1 January 1883, Buffalo, N.Y. G.O., No.: 56, W.D., 1922.

Citation: Lt. Col. Donovan personally led the assaulting wave in an attack upon a very strongly organized position, and when our troops were suffering heavy casualties he encouraged all near him by his example, moving among his men in exposed positions, reorganizing decimated platoons, and accompanying them forward in attacks. When he was wounded in the leg by machine-gun bullets, he refused to be evacuated and continued with his unit until it withdrew to a less exposed position.

=== Richard W. O'Neill ===
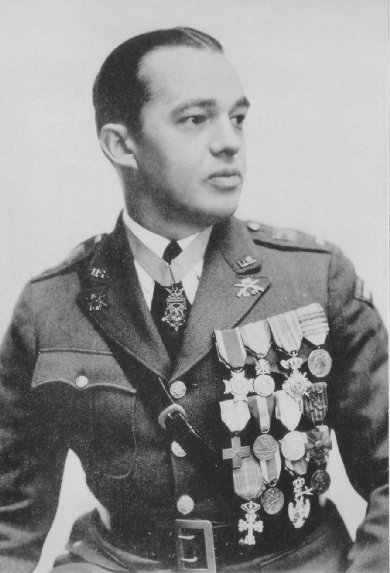
Richard W. O'Neill

Rank and organization: Sergeant, U.S. Army, Company D, 165th Infantry, 42d Division. Place and date: On the Ourcq River, France, 30 July 1918. Entered service at: New York, N.Y. Birth: New York, N.Y. G.O. No.: 30, W.D., 1921.

Citation: In advance of an assaulting line, he attacked a detachment of about 25 of the enemy. In the ensuing hand-to-hand encounter he sustained pistol wounds, but heroically continued in the advance, during which he received additional wounds: but, with great physical effort, he remained in active command of his detachment. Being again wounded, he was forced by weakness and loss of blood to be evacuated but insisted upon being taken first to the battalion commander in order to transmit to him valuable information relative to enemy positions and the disposition of our men.

=== Alejandro R. Renteria Ruiz ===
Rank and organization: Private First Class, U.S. Army, 165th Infantry, 27th Infantry Division. Place and date: Okinawa, Ryukyu Islands, 28 April 1945. Entered service at: Carlsbad, N. Mex. Birth: Loving, N. Mex. G.O. No.: 60, 26 June 1946.

Citation: When his unit was stopped by a skillfully camouflaged enemy pillbox, he displayed conspicuous gallantry and intrepidity above and beyond the call of duty. His squad, suddenly brought under a hail of machinegun fire and a vicious grenade attack, was pinned down. Jumping to his feet, Pfc. Ruiz seized an automatic rifle and lunged through the flying grenades and rifle and automatic fire for the top of the emplacement. When an enemy soldier charged him, his rifle jammed. Undaunted, Pfc. Ruiz whirled on his assailant and clubbed him down. Then he ran back through bullets and grenades, seized more ammunition and another automatic rifle, and again made for the pillbox. Enemy fire now was concentrated on him, but he charged on, miraculously reaching the position, and in plain view he climbed to the top. Leaping from 1 opening to another, he sent burst after burst into the pillbox, killing 12 of the enemy and completely destroying the position. Pfc. Ruiz's heroic conduct, in the face of overwhelming odds, saved the lives of many comrades and eliminated an obstacle that long would have checked his unit's advance.

== Insignia ==
The regiment's unit insignia depicts both the 1861 regimental dress cap device braced by two Irish Wolfhounds and the red shamrock of the First Division of the Second Corps of the Army of the Potomac in the Civil War. These are separated by a rainbow depicting the unit's service as a founding regiment of the 42nd Rainbow Division in World War I. The green background on the insignia is rare; most infantry units have an infantry blue background. The regiment has this because its Civil War regimental colors (flags) were green with the Golden Harp of Ireland. Like all New York National Guard units, the coat of arms has as its crest Henry Hudson's ship Halve Maen.

== Traditions ==
Many of the 69th's traditions and symbols derive from a time when the regiment was made entirely of Irish-Americans. The regiment's Civil War-era battle cry was "Faugh a Ballagh," which means "Clear the Way" in Irish. This is reminiscent of the cry of the Irish Brigade of the French Army in the Battle of Fontenoy. A World War I-era battle cry is "Garryowen in Glory!" Its motto is "Gentle when stroked - Fierce when provoked" in reference to the Irish Wolfhounds on its crest and dress cap badges of 1861.

Though by 2001 the regiment was "no more Irish than the Notre Dame football team",. it retained many of the traditions arising from its Irish heritage. The New York City St. Patrick's Day Parade up Fifth Avenue has always been led by the regiment and its Irish Wolfhounds. (Note: In addition, world renown championship bagpiper Joe Brady is the lone bagpiper marching in the NYC St Patrick's Day parade leading the fighting 69th playing the Garryowen.) In some ceremonies, the regiment's officers and senior non-commissioned officers carry shillelaghs as a badge of rank. Additionally, it is traditional to wear a small sprig of boxwood on one's headgear in combat, as was first done in the Civil War.

== In popular culture ==
=== Films ===
- 1940: The World War I exploits of the regiment are the subject of the Warner Brothers film The Fighting 69th starring James Cagney, Pat O'Brien as Father Duffy and George Brent as Major "Wild Bill" Donovan. An advisor to the film was former member Captain John T. Prout who later was a major general in the Irish Army. The film was shown at drills to all persons joining the regiment through the 1970s
- 1941: The movie comedy Buck Privates has the character Julia mention that her father was a captain in the "Fighting 69th".
- 1948: In the movie Fort Apache with John Wayne and Henry Fonda, Sergeant Major Michael O'Rourke (Ward Bond) had been a major in the 69th.
- 1988: The regiment flag is shown in the film Glory
- 1993: The regiment is shown receiving general absolution from Rev. William Corby before going into battle at Gettysburg in the film Gettysburg.
- 2003: The regiment's attack on Marye's Heights during the Battle of Fredericksburg is depicted in the film Gods and Generals. (Note: They can be seen wearing the regiment's traditional green boxwood sprigs in their kepis during the attack.)
- 2006: Fictional veterans of the Fighting 69th are portrayed in season three of HBO's Deadwood series, as agents of George Hearst.
- 2007: The military units in the film remake I Am Legend are members of the Fighting 69th.
- 2008: The 2008 film Cloverfield depicts the 69th Infantry Regiment and other elements of the regular and reserve military doing battle with a giant monster in the streets of New York City.

=== Other ===
- The official regimental cocktail, "The Fighting 69th", is made of three parts champagne and one part Irish whiskey, and is served at unit dinners and after the St. Patrick's Day Parade. According to one legend, the Civil War regimental commander, Thomas Francis Meagher, liked to drink his whiskey with Vichy water. But one day when his aide was unable to find Vichy water, he returned with champagne. Meagher liked the new mixture, and the drink stuck. Others feel that it is more likely the mixture simply developed as necessity during the unit's service in the Champagne region of France during World War I, as cocktails without bitters are mostly a 20th-century invention.
- One of the first books on mixing drinks, JerryThomas's 1862 "The Bon Vivant's Companion", describes a "69th Regiment Punch" as consisting of 1 oz of Irish whiskey, 1 oz of Scotch whisky, a teaspoon of sugar, and 4 oz of hot water.
- The Fighting 69th is a popular subject with painters of Civil War subjects. Paintings and prints depicting it have been made by Don Troiani, Dale Gallon, Mort Kunstler, Donna Neary, and many other artists.
- The Wolfe Tones recorded a song called "The Fighting 69th", which is a tribute to the regiment, set to the tune of "Star of the County Down". A video of it is on YouTube. (Note: Can be found on YouTube, as The Wolftones The Fighting 69th.The Irish Brigade, 26 May 2010) It was later recorded by the Boston-based Celtic Punk band, Dropkick Murphys on their album "The Gang's all Here".
- David Kincaid's song "The Irish Volunteer" is a tribute to the regiment (Note: Can be found on YouTube)
- "Pat Murphy of the Irish Brigade" by Bobby Horton is another song tribute (Note: Can be found on YouTube)
- The Fighting 69th is featured in the book by Joseph Bruchac, "March toward the Thunder".
- "Clear the Way" is a song written and performed by Irish musician John Doyle (musician) on his 2011 album "Shadow and Light". The phrase is the English translation of the Gaelic "Faugh A Ballagh", the battle cry taken by Francis Meagher. The song tells the story of the Battle of Fredericksburg from the point of view of one of the Irish soldiers. (Note: Can be found on YouTube)
- In the 2023 Beavis and Butt-Head episode "Stolen Valor", Butt-Head claims to be in the 69th division in an attempt to get free beer from an American Legion post. He chose this because of the double entendre with the sex position of the same name.

== 69th Regiment Armory ==
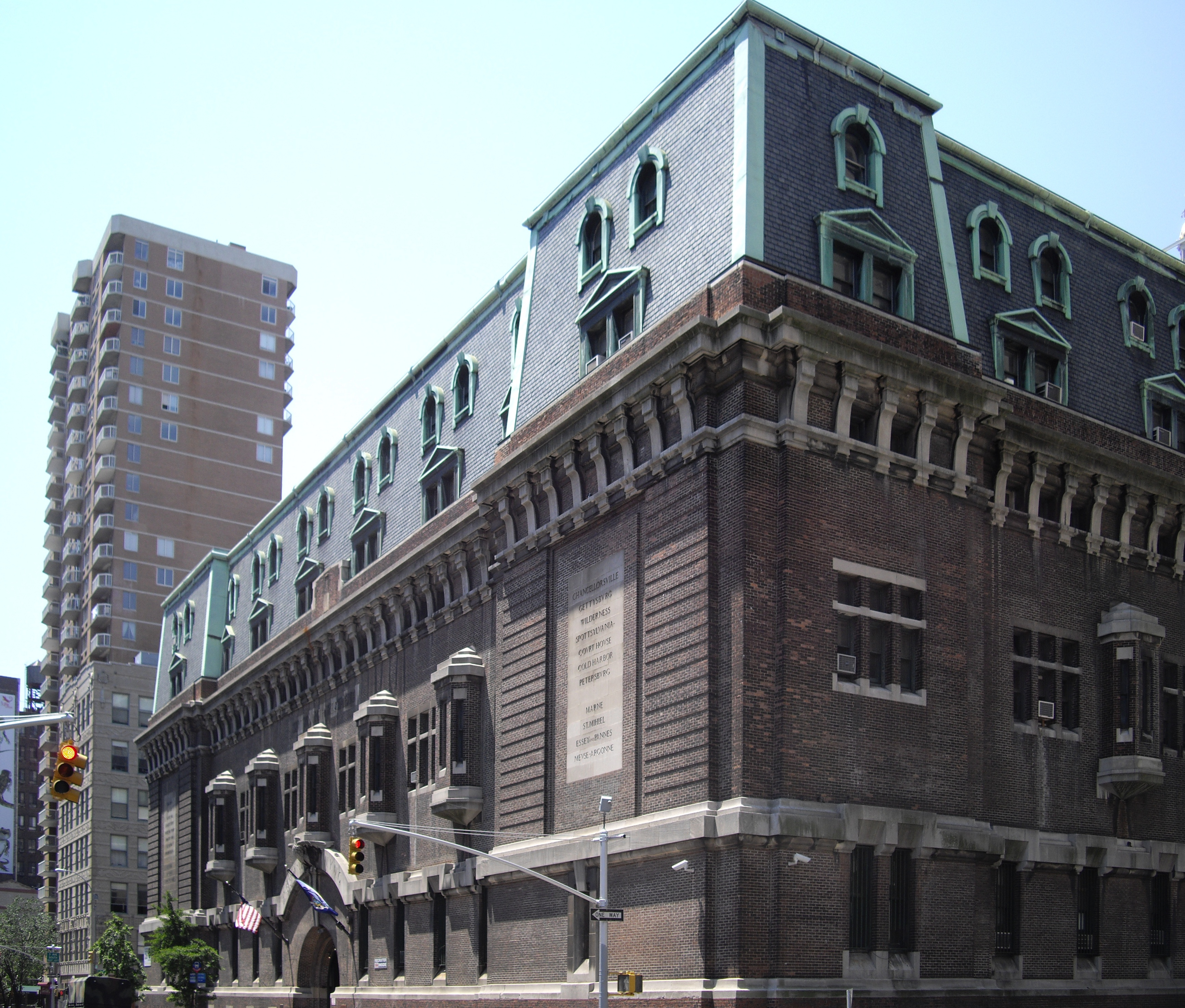
The armory of the 69th Infantry Regiment, at 68 Lexington Avenue in New York City

The main armory on Lexington Avenue at 25th Street has the names of its Civil War and World War I Battles engraved on its front. A museum depicting the history of the regiment is in the lobby and murals of the unit's past service adorn the mess rooms. Before the unit's realignment to Long Island, Companies B & C were based at the Flushing Armory on Northern Blvd. in Flushing. The Headquarters Company and Company A of 1st Battalion, 69th Infantry currently are stationed at the armory.

On 12 April 1983, the Landmarks Preservation Commission designated the 69th Regiment Armory an official New York City landmark. The armory was also the 1913 scene of one of the first exhibits of modern art in the US, now simply referred to as the Armory Show. It was even depicted on a US postage stamp.

After the September 11, 2001, attacks, the armory was used as an information and counseling center for the families of the victims of the attacks.

== See also ==
- The Fighting 69th (film about the regiment in WWI)
- List of New York Civil War regiments
