= Thomas Mooney (American chaplain) =

American Catholic priest and military chaplain (1824–1877)

Father Thomas J. Mooney
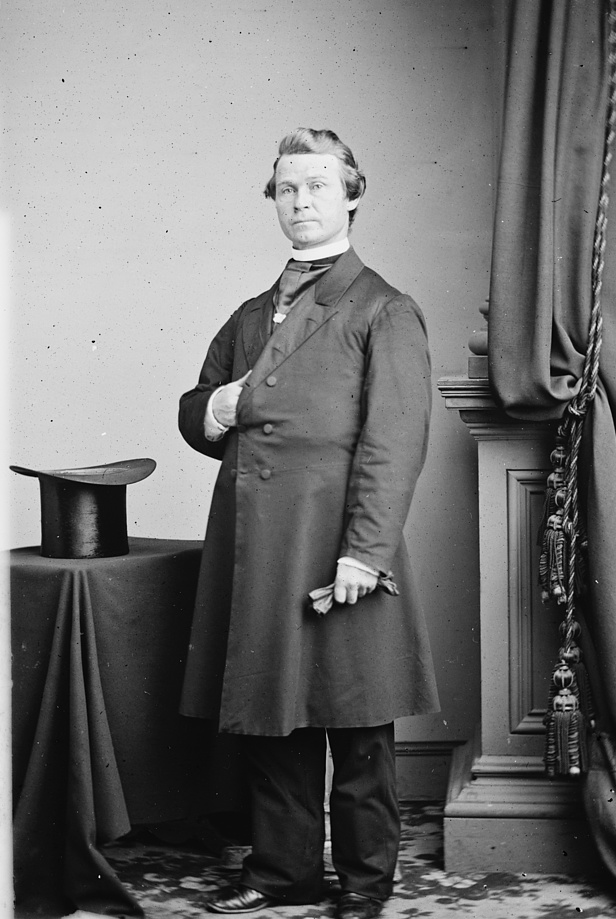
- Mooney, c. 1855
- Church: Catholic Church
- Archdiocese: Roman Catholic Archdiocese of New York

Orders
- Ordination: January 28, 1853 by John Hughes

Personal details
- Born: 1824 Manchester, England
- Died: September 13, 1877 (aged 52–53) New York City, U.S.
- Buried: Calvary Cemetery, Queens, New York, U.S.

Thomas J. Mooney (1824 – September 13, 1877) was an American Catholic priest and military chaplain during the American Civil War. Ordained in 1853, his short span with the New York State Militia's Fighting 69th was met with affection from his soldiers. The antics his soldiers appreciated, however, embarrassed Mooney's archbishop due to negative press coverage, and Mooney was soon recalled to his parish. He remained involved in Irish causes; his untimely death in a carriage accident was followed by a funeral attended by thousands.

== Early life ==
Thomas J. Mooney was born in 1824 in Manchester, England, to Irish parents. He immigrated to the United States in 1840. After studying at St. Joseph's Seminary at Fordham, he was ordained by Archbishop John Hughes on January 28, 1853. Mooney was appointed to St. Brigid Roman Catholic Church in Manhattan, first as assistant but later as pastor. In 1856, Mooney opened a parish school for 300 children; by 1857, a school building had been constructed, 550 pupils were enrolled and taught by the Sisters of Charity and the Christian Brothers. Hughes described Mooney as "foolish without malice" and "a consistently imprudent young man who said all the wrong things to the wrong people at the wrong time", but nonetheless said he was one of the "most devoted priests" of the Archdiocese of New York.

== Chaplaincy ==
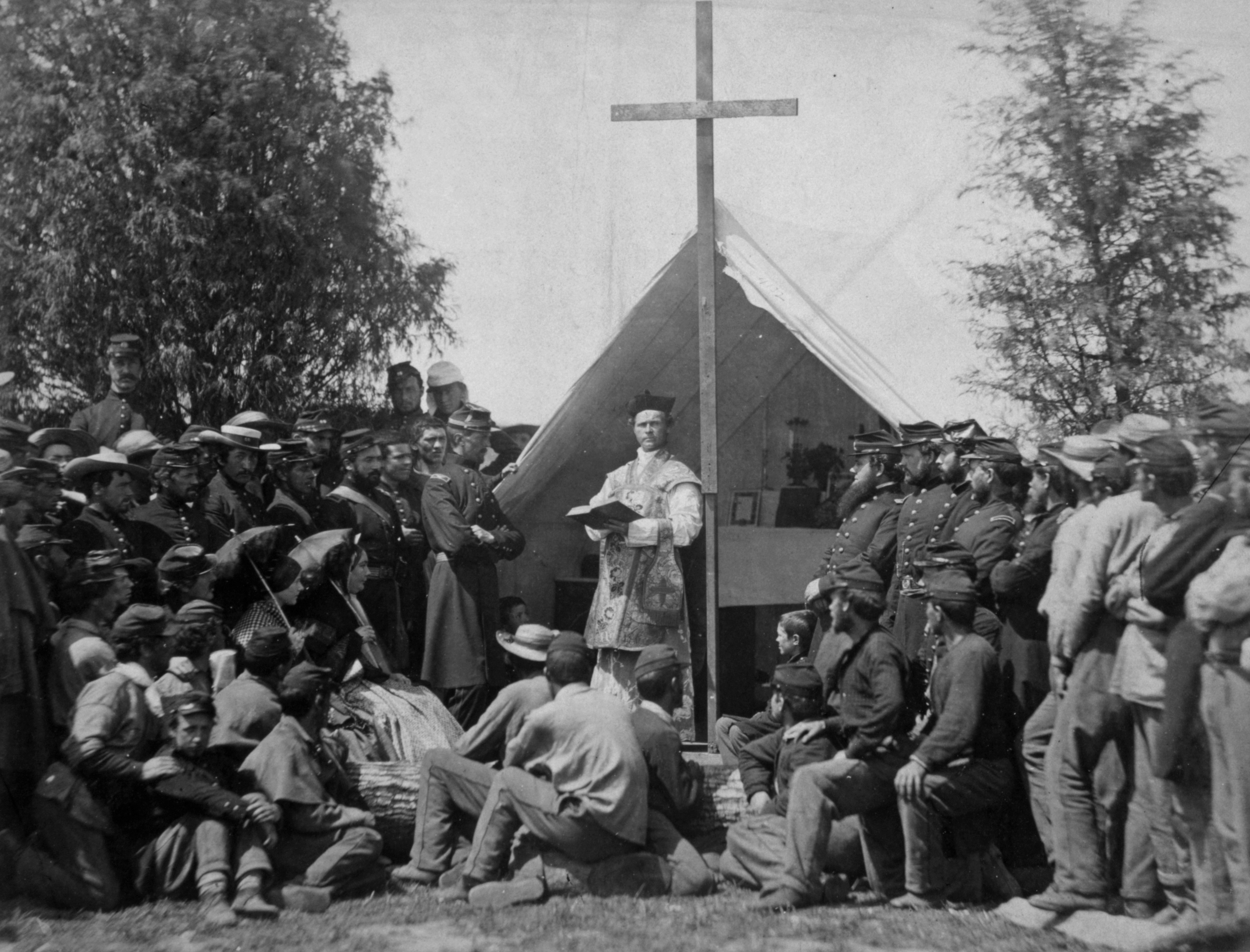
Mooney celebrating Mass for the New York State Militia at Fort Corcoran on June 1, 1861

Mooney became the chaplain of the Fighting 69th regiment of the New York State Militia on April 20, 1861, initially only as a temporary assignment. Mooney mustered several hundred Irishmen to join the unit before it departed the city. The regiment left New York by steamship to Washington, D.C. in late April 1861, with some 1,040 men.

Mooney said Mass for the unit, and regularly held rosary and confession services. He sponsored a regimental temperance society. He was popular with his soldiers, who enjoyed his light antics. Mooney also wrote a letter to President Abraham Lincoln seeking clemency for a soldier, James Foley, who had received the death penalty for killing a fellow soldier; the sentence was commuted to life imprisonment. The New York Times said he was an "admirable specimen-priest" who, "if he were not a chaplain, would certainly be a candidate for Colonel".

The Fighting 69th crossed the Potomac River on May 4, after Virginia's secession from the union. The unit built fortifications near Arlington, which were given the name Fort Corcoran. Mooney, looking to boost morale, climbed a flagpole to unfurl a tangled Old Glory, and "baptized" one of the new cannons at the fort. The "baptism", which took place on June 12, was accompanied by a sermon comparing the cries of a newborn baby to the noise of the cannon, and may have called on the soldiers to "flail" the Confederates. When Archbishop Hughes heard of the incident, he sent a letter recalling Mooney to his parish, writing:

"You have disappointed me... Your inauguration of a ceremony unknown to the Church, viz., the blessing of a cannon was sufficiently bad, but your remarks on that occasion are infinitely worse. Under the circumstances, and for other reasons, I wish you to return, within three days from the receipt of this letter, to your pastoral duties at St. Brigid's. [...] You have enough to do at home in your ministry, whether home or abroad I shall expect that you will bear yourself in all things with gravity and decorum such as becomes a Catholic priest that has the cura animarum (care of souls)"

Soldiers in the unit wanted Mooney to stay, but the chaplain was nonetheless replaced by a Jesuit priest, Bernard O'Reilly. Mooney's actions had been reported unfavorably in Protestant and secular newspapers, embarrassing Hughes.

Mooney returned to New York on July 10, 1861, where he was greeted by thousands and met with church bells, cannons, and singing. Mooney's departure from the unit did not decrease his pastoral care towards it; after the First Battle of Bull Run, in which 38 members of the Fighting 69th died, Mooney celebrated a Requiem Mass; Mozart's setting of the Mass was performed. When the soldiers returned after their 90-day enlistment, he joined them in a celebratory parade. It was described as "one of the liveliest scenes which ever took place on Tompkins Square."

== Post-military life ==
During the New York City draft riots of July 1863, Mooney organized a neighborhood group to counter the federal troops sent to New York. Mooney was conspicuously present at all Irish Brigade functions and was much beloved by the men who survived to remember him. In 1874, Mooney presided over the wedding of Union General Sherman's daughter, Minnie.

=== Death ===
While driving on Fifth Avenue on September 11, 1877, Mooney was thrown from his carriage after a collision. Sources report that he hit a mass of stone or an unmarked, unlit sewage excavation project. He fractured one of his ribs, broke his collarbone, and struck his head. After initially beginning to recover, he took a turn for the worse and died two days after the accident on September 13, 1877. Six bishops, 400 priests, and 10,000 others attended the funeral inside St. Brigid church and on the streets. He was buried at Calvary Cemetery in Queens.
