= John William Barker =

American Brigadier general

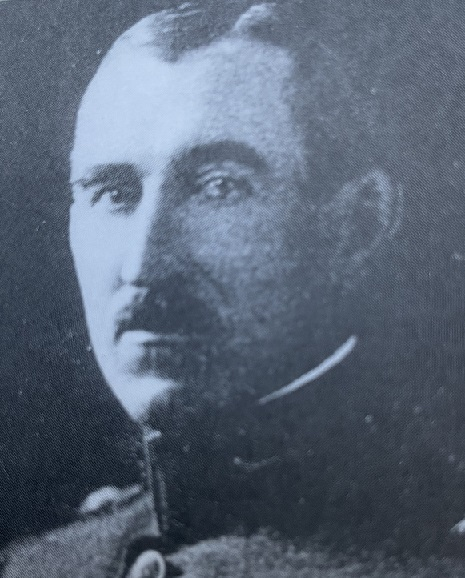
- From 1930's Annual Report of the Association of Graduates of the United States Military Academy
- Born: December 25, 1872; Syracuse, New York, U.S.
- Died: May 4, 1924 (aged 51); New York City, New York, U.S.
- Burial place: Arlington National Cemetery
- Spouse: Mathilde Fritche (m. 1907–1924)
- Children: 1
- Military career
- Allegiance: United States
- Branch: United States Army
- Service years: 1894–1920
- Rank: Brigadier General
- Service number: 0-13457
- Unit: U.S. Army Infantry Branch
- Commands: Company F, 3rd Infantry Regiment; 83rd Division Depot, Le Mans; 165th Infantry Regiment
- Wars: American Indian Wars; Spanish–American War; Philippine–American War; Moro Rebellion; World War I
- Awards: Silver Star (2); Legion of Honor (Officer) (France); Croix de guerre (France)

John William Barker (December 25, 1872 – May 14, 1924) was a career officer in the United States Army. A veteran of the American Indian Wars, Spanish–American War, Philippine–American War, World War I, he served from 1894 to 1920. Barker attained the rank of brigadier general, and was a recipient of two Silver Stars, the French Legion of Honor (Officer), and the French Croix de guerre.

== Early life ==
John W. Barker was born in Syracuse, New York on December 25, 1872, the son of Frederick William Barker and Adelaide (King) Barker. He was raised and educated in Syracuse, and graduated from Syracuse High School in 1889. In November 1889 he was selected for appointment to the United States Military Academy (West Point). He began attendance in 1890, graduated in 1894 ranked 49th of 54, and received his commission as a second lieutenant of Infantry.

== Early career ==
Barker was commissioned in the 9th Infantry Regiment, and was on post-graduation leave when he learned that his regiment was en route from Madison Barracks in Sackets Harbor, New York to Chicago to take part in the federal government's response to the Pullman Strike. He volunteered to surrender his leave, joined the 9th Infantry when its train passed through Syracuse, and took part in the regiment's strike response activities.

After serving with the 9th Infantry at Madison Barracks, Barker was transferred to the 3rd Infantry at Fort Snelling, Minnesota, with which he served for 16 years. During the Spanish–American War, he served with his regiment in Cuba, and took part in the Battle of El Caney and Siege of Santiago, for which he received the Citation Star. Barker contracted yellow fever and returned to the United States to convalesce, after which he performed temporary recruiting duty in Norfolk, Virginia.

In October 1898, he took part in one of the last conflicts of the American Indian Wars when his unit fought in the Battle of Sugar Point at Leech Lake, Minnesota.

== Continued career ==
After serving as commander of Company F, 3rd Infantry during the Philippine–American War, Barker spent several years at Fort Thomas, Kentucky, then served at Fort William H. Seward, Alaska, and Fort Lewis, Washington. From 1906 to 1908, he served at Fort Lawton, Washington. He attended the Army Service Schools at Fort Leavenworth, Kansas from August 1908 to June 1911; he was an honor graduate from the School of the Line in 1909 and graduated from the Army Staff College in 1910.

After completing the Army Staff College, Barker was detailed to temporary duty with the Signal Corps, and completed the Signal Officers Course in 1911. Barker them rejoined the 3rd Infantry, which was assigned to the Philippines during the Moro Rebellion. He was involved in several engagements on the island of Jolo, and was wounded at the Second Battle of Bud Dajo, which required him to be hospitalized for six weeks. Barker received a second award of the Citation Star for his heroism.

== Later career ==
Barker served with the 3rd Infantry at Madison Barracks from April 1912 to June 1914, when he was invited to become a stagiaire (student and intern) with the French Army. Barker was assigned to a French regiment, but served only briefly because World War I commenced in July 1914. As a result, Barker was military attaché for Myron T. Herrick, the American Ambassador in Paris.

Because the U.S. had not yet entered the war, President Woodrow Wilson designated Barker a neutral observer. With the permission of the French Ministry of War, Barker was able to follow the movements of the French Army and made numerous contacts among France's military leaders. He was promoted to major in July 1916, and continued in this role until June 1917, two months after the American entry into World War I.

When the American Expeditionary Forces arrived in France in the spring of 1917, Barker was promoted to lieutenant colonel and served on General John J. Pershing's staff. He was promoted to temporary colonel in August 1917 and commanded a depot of the 83rd Division. From January to May 1918, Barker commanded the 165th Infantry Regiment, and led it during numerous battles against the Germans.

In June 1918, Barker returned to the United States, where he served in the office of the Adjutant General until his retirement. In October 1918, he was promoted to temporary brigadier general.

In March 1919, with the war now over due to the armistice with Germany, Barker reverted to his permanent rank of lieutenant colonel. He retired for disability in June 1920 and was advanced to colonel on the retired list in July 1920.

== Awards ==
Barker earned a Citation Star in both Cuba and the Philippines, which were converted to the Silver Star when the new award was created in 1932. For his World War I service, Barker was a recipient of the French Legion of Honor (Officer) and Croix de guerre.

== Death and legacy ==
Barker died in New York City on May 14, 1924. He was buried at Arlington National Cemetery. In 1930, the U.S. Congress passed legislation allowing the general officers of World War I to retire at their highest rank, and Barker's grade of brigadier general was posthumously restored.
