= Louis Lang =

American painter

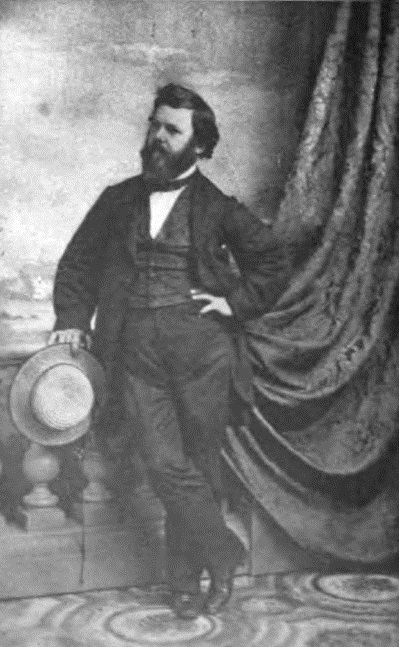
Louis Lang.

Louis Lang (29 February 1812 – 6 May 1893) was a German-American painter.

== Biography ==
He was born as Joseph Aloysius Lang in Waldsee, Kingdom of Württemberg. His father, a historical painter, wished him to become a musician, but his taste was for art. At the age of 16, he executed pastels with success. He studied at Stuttgart and Paris, and settled in the United States in 1838, his studio being for several years in Philadelphia. He spent the years 1841 to 1845 in Italy, and moved to New York City in 1845, where he resided, with frequent visits to Europe. He was elected a National Academician in 1852, and was a member of the Artists' Fund Society.

== Works ==
Lang's style was characterized by brilliant but well-balanced coloring. Among his works are:

- "Maid of Saragossa"
- "Mary Stuart distributing Gifts"
- "Blind Nydia"
- "Jephtha's Daughter"
- "Neapolitan Fisher Family"
- "Mary, Queen of Scots"
- "Cinderella"
- "Return of the 69th (Irish) Regiment"
- "Asleep in Prayer" (1869)
- "Little Graziosa among the Butterflies" (1871)
- "Landing of the Market-Boat at Capri" (1876)
- "Romeo and Juliet" (Century Club, New York)
- "Portrait of a Little Child" (1885)

== Gallery ==
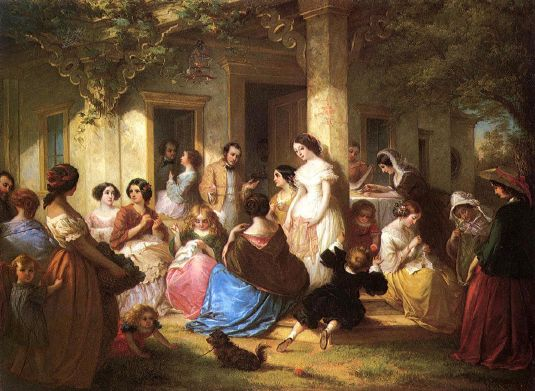
Painting (or pastel?) of a sewing party.

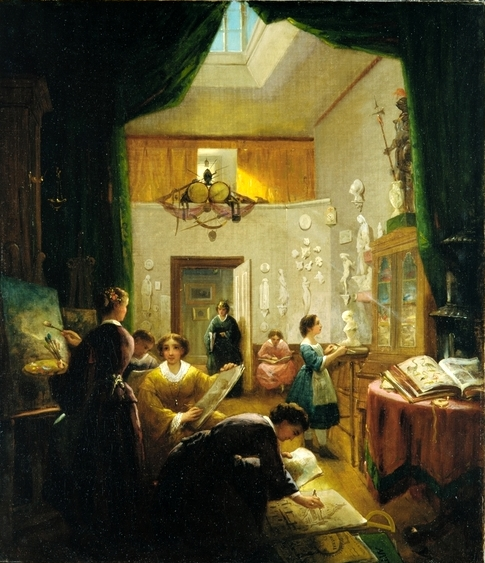
Women's Art Class.

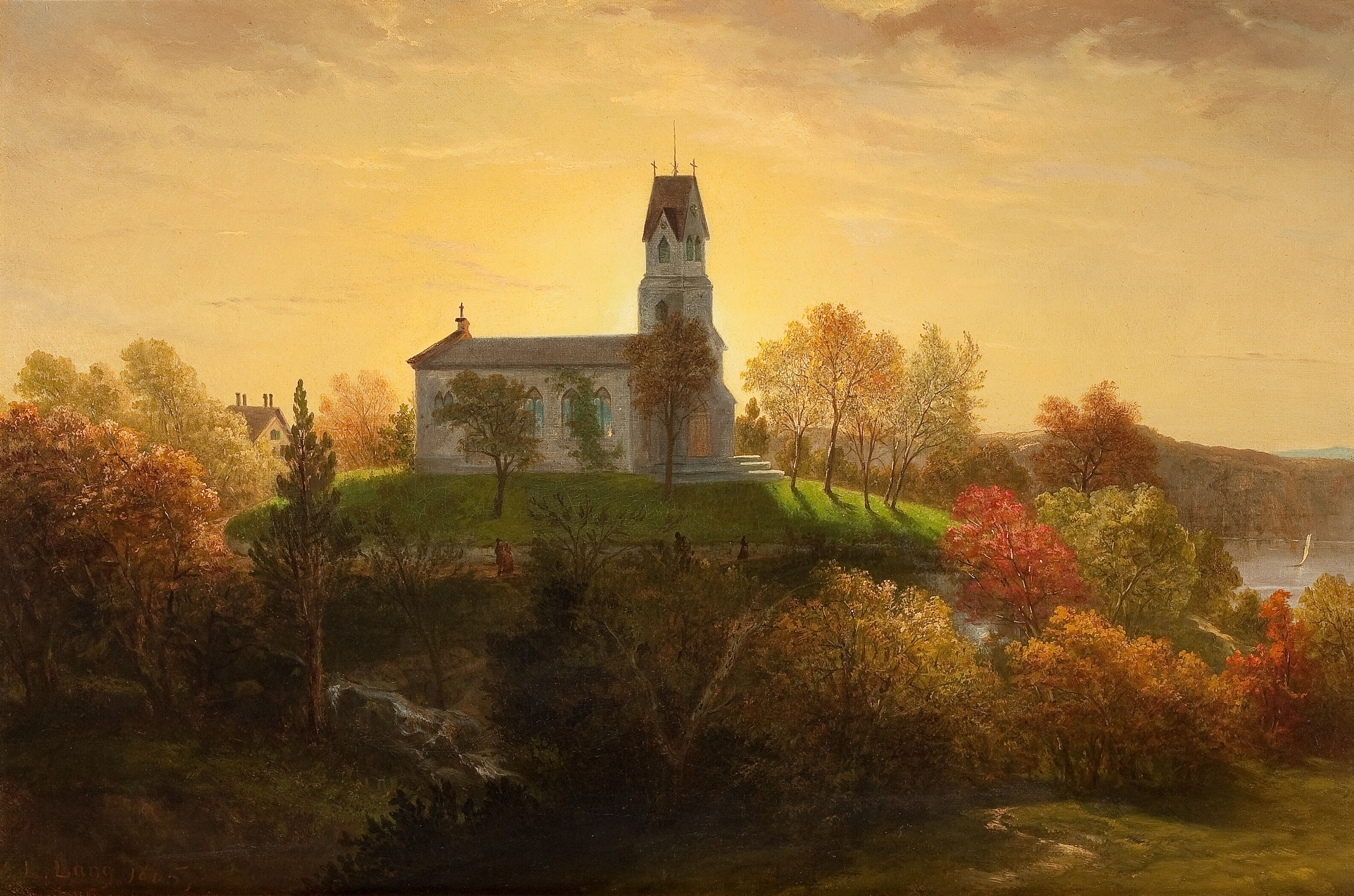
St. Mary's in the Highlands, Garrison, New York, 1865.

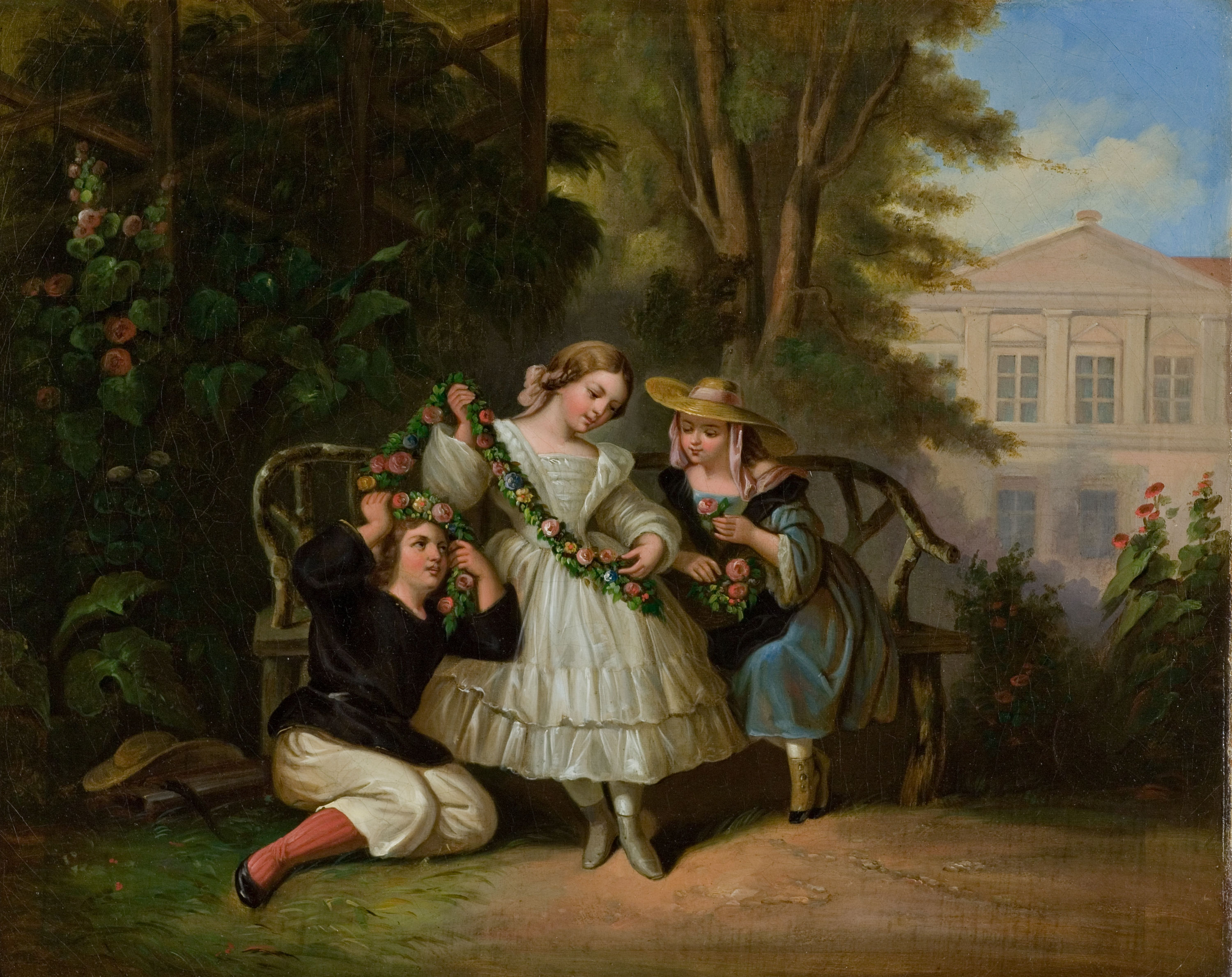
Afternoon in the Garden

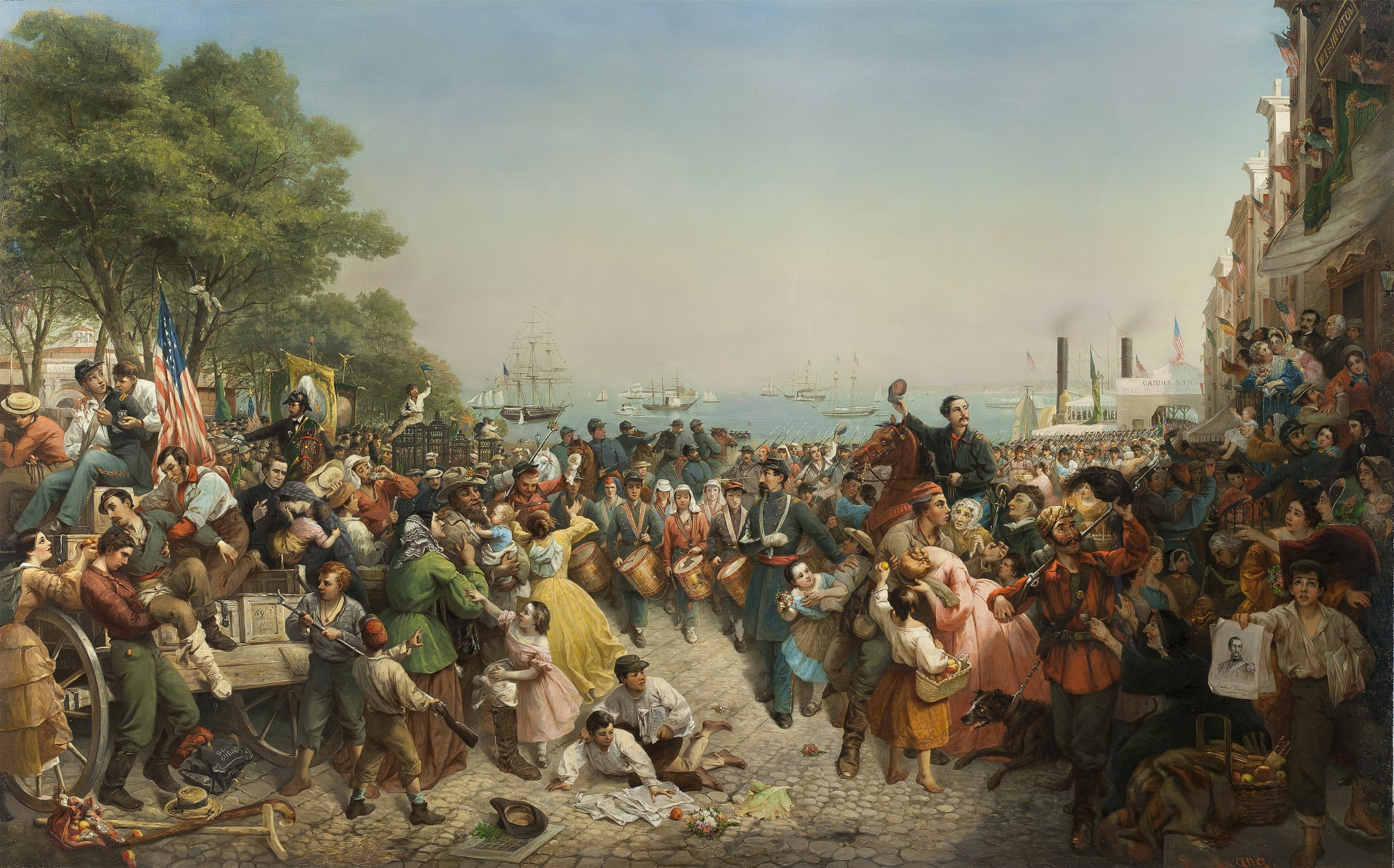
Return of the 69th (Irish) Regiment, N.Y.S.M. from the Seat of War, 1862.
