= Character flaw =

Imperfection in a fictional character

In the creation and criticism of fictional works, a character flaw or heroic flaw is a bias, limitation, imperfection, problem, personality disorder, vice, phobia, prejudice, or deficiency present in a character who may be otherwise very functional. The flaw can be a problem that directly affects the character's actions and abilities, such as a violent temper. Alternatively, it can be a simple foible or personality defect, which affects the character's motives and social interactions, but little else.

Flaws can add complexity, depth and humanity to the characters in a narrative. For example, the sheriff with a gambling addiction, the action hero who is afraid of heights, or a lead in a romantic comedy who must overcome his insecurity regarding male pattern baldness are all characters whose flaws help provide dimension.

In general, flaws can be categorized as minor, major, or tragic.

== Minor flaw ==
A minor character flaw is an imperfection which serves to distinguish the character in the mind of the reader / viewer / player / listener, making them memorable and individual, but otherwise does not affect the story in any way.

Examples of this could include a noticeable scar, a thick accent or a habit such as cracking their knuckles.

Protagonists and other major characters may (and usually do) have multiple minor flaws, making them more accessible, and enabling the reader / viewer / listener to relate to the character (in the case of a sympathetic character) or otherwise influence the audience's opinions of the character.

Many insignificant or archetypal characters which are encountered only once or rarely are defined solely by a single minor flaw, differentiating them from the stock character or archetype that they adhere to.

== Major flaw ==
A major character flaw is a much more noticeable and important hindrance which actually impairs the individual, whether physically, mentally or morally. Sometimes major flaws are not actually negative per se (such as devout religious beliefs or a rigid code of honor), but are classified as such in that they often serve to hinder or restrict the character in some way.

Examples of this type of flaw could include blindness, amnesia or greed.

Unlike minor flaws, major flaws are almost invariably important to either the character's, or the story's development.

- For villains, their major flaw is usually the cause of their eventual downfall.
- For heroes, their major flaw usually must be overcome (either temporarily or permanently) at some point in the story, often at the climax, by their own determination or skill.
- For neutral characters, or those that shift allegiance, the major flaw is usually the cause of either their corruption, redemption or both.
- For the protagonist, the most visible flaw generally serves a more vital interest, as well, as it defines their core problem. It is the protagonist's reluctant (and usually unconscious) journey to address this problem that forms the spine of the story, sometimes acting as the MacGuffin to stimulate the plot.

== Tragic/fatal flaw ==
This is a character flaw that brings about the downfall and/or death of a tragic hero. In Greek literary theory, it was called "Hamartia".

As a fictional device, hamartia is first identified by Aristotle in his Poetics. The term has been extended to identify the character flaws that lead to the tragedies of later characters such as Othello or Hamlet.

Examples of hamartia could include hubris, misplaced trust, excessive curiosity, pride and lack of self-control.

This fall usually occurs at the beginning of a story, with the story itself concentrating on the consequences or attempted redemption of the fall.

== In contemporary creative writing teaching ==
Contemporary creative writing tutorials frequently encourage writers to introduce flaws to make their characters more believable, relatable, or entertaining. While this advice often references canonical authors such as Jane Austen, it ignores any notion that these authors use character flaws to explore morality, as described in literary criticism from Aristotle to F.R. Leavis's The Great Tradition and beyond. Instead, the focus is on believability and authenticity: Elizabeth Bennet and Mr Darcy's flaws make "the story more realistic, and this realism allows the narrative to feel authentic".
