= Trees (poem) =

Poem by Joyce Kilmer

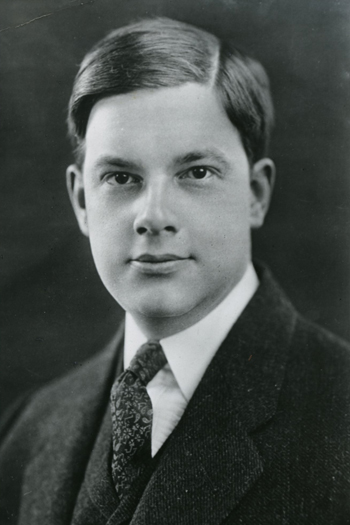
Joyce Kilmer's Columbia University yearbook photograph, c. 1908

"Trees" is a lyric poem by American poet Alfred Joyce Kilmer. Written in February 1913, it was first published in Poetry: A Magazine of Verse that August and included in Kilmer's 1914 collection Trees and Other Poems. The poem, in twelve lines of rhyming couplets of iambic tetrameter verse, describes what Kilmer perceives as the inability of art created by humankind to replicate the beauty achieved by nature.

Kilmer is most remembered for "Trees", which has been the subject of frequent parodies and references in popular culture. Kilmer's work is often disparaged by critics and dismissed by scholars as being too simple and overly sentimental, and that his style was far too traditional and even archaic. Despite this, the popular appeal of "Trees" has contributed to its endurance. Literary critic Guy Davenport considers it "the one poem known by practically everybody". "Trees" is frequently included in poetry anthologies and has been set to music several times—including a popular rendition by Oscar Rasbach, performed by singers Nelson Eddy, Robert Merrill, and Paul Robeson.

The location for a specific tree as the possible inspiration for the poem has been claimed by several places and institutions connected to Kilmer's life; among these are Rutgers University, the University of Notre Dame, and towns across the country that Kilmer visited. However, Kilmer's eldest son, Kenton, declares that the poem does not apply to any one tree—that it could apply equally to any. "Trees" was written in an upstairs bedroom at the family's home in Mahwah, New Jersey, that "looked out down a hill, on our well-wooded lawn". Kenton Kilmer stated that while his father was "widely known for his affection for trees, his affection was certainly not sentimental—the most distinguished feature of Kilmer's property was a colossal woodpile outside his home".

== Writing ==
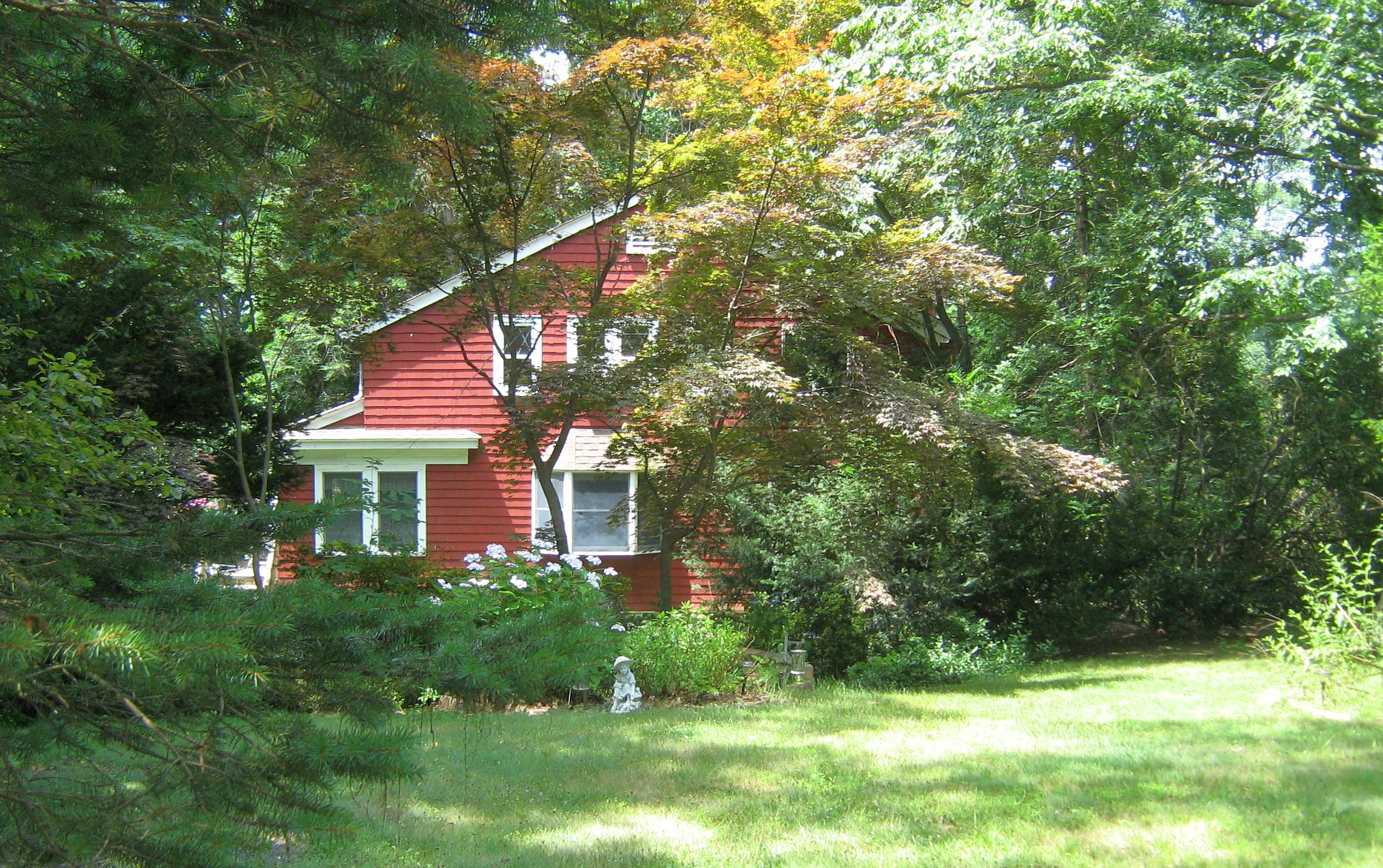
The Kilmer family home in Mahwah, New Jersey, where "Trees" was written in February 1913

=== Mahwah: February 1913 ===
According to Kilmer's oldest son, Kenton, "Trees" was written on February 2, 1913, when the family resided in Mahwah, New Jersey, in the northwestern corner of Bergen County. The Kilmers lived on the southwest corner of the intersection of Airmount Road and Armour Road in Mahwah for five years and the house overlooked the Ramapo Valley. (Note: There is also an Airmont Avenue in Mahwah; the Kilmers lived on Airmount Road, not Airmont Ave.)

It was written in the afternoon in the intervals of some other writing. The desk was in an upstairs room, by a window looking down a wooded hill. It was written in a little notebook in which his father and mother wrote out copies of several of their poems and, in most cases, added the date of composition. On one page the first two lines of 'Trees' appear, with the date, February 2, 1913, and on another page, further on in the book, is the full text of the poem. It was dedicated to his wife's mother, Mrs. Henry Mills Alden, who was endeared to all her family.

In 2013, the notebook alluded to by Kilmer's son was uncovered by journalist and Kilmer researcher Alex Michelini in Georgetown University's Lauinger Library in a collection of family papers donated to the university by Kilmer's granddaughter, Miriam Kilmer. The "Mrs. Henry Mills Alden" to whom the poem was dedicated was Ada Foster Murray Alden (1866–1936), the mother of Kilmer's wife, Aline Murray Kilmer (1888–1941). Alden, a writer, had married Harper's Magazine editor Henry Mills Alden in 1900.

=== Kilmer's inspiration ===
Kilmer's poetry was influenced by "his strong religious faith and dedication to the natural beauty of the world."

Although several communities across the United States claim to have inspired "Trees", nothing can be established specifically regarding Kilmer's inspiration except that he wrote the poem while residing in Mahwah. Both Kilmer's widow, Aline, and his son, Kenton, refuted these claims in their correspondence with researchers and by Kenton in his memoir. Kenton wrote to University of Notre Dame researcher Dorothy Colson:

Mother and I agreed, when we talked about it, that Dad never meant his poem to apply to one particular tree, or to the trees of any special region. Just any trees or all trees that might be rained on or snowed on, and that would be suitable nesting places for robins. I guess they'd have to have upward-reaching branches, too, for the line about 'lifting leafy arms to pray.' Rule out weeping willows.

According to Kenton Kilmer, the upstairs room in which the poem was written looked down the hill over the family's "well-wooded lawn" that contained "trees of many kinds, from mature trees to thin saplings: oaks, maples, black and white birches, and I do not know what else." A published interview with Joyce Kilmer in 1915 mentioned the poet's large woodpile at the family's Mahwah home:

while Kilmer might be widely known for his affection for trees, his affection was certainly not sentimental—the most distinguished feature of Kilmer's property was a colossal woodpile outside his home. The house stood in the middle of a forest and what lawn it possessed was obtained only after Kilmer had spent months of weekend toil in chopping down trees, pulling up stumps, and splitting logs. Kilmer's neighbors had difficulty in believing that a man who could do that could also be a poet.

== Scansion and analysis ==
"Trees" (1913)

I think that I shall never see
A poem lovely as a tree.

A tree whose hungry mouth is prest
Against the earth's sweet flowing breast;

A tree that looks at God all day,
And lifts her leafy arms to pray;

A tree that may in Summer wear
A nest of robins in her hair;

Upon whose bosom snow has lain;
Who intimately lives with rain.

Poems are made by fools like me,
But only God can make a tree. (Note: The fourth line is quoted as "Against the sweet earth's flowing breast;" (with "sweet" at a different position) in text archive Bartleby.com's copy of the poem. (This seems to be a typo rather than a variant.))

A reading of "trees"

"Trees" is a poem of twelve lines in strict iambic tetrameter. The eleventh, or penultimate, line inverts the first foot, so that it contains the same number of syllables, but the first two are a trochee. The poem's rhyme scheme is rhyming couplets rendered AA BB CC DD EE AA.

Despite its deceptive simplicity in rhyme and meter, "Trees" is notable for its use of personification and anthropomorphic imagery: the tree of the poem, which Kilmer depicts as female, is depicted as pressing its mouth to the Earth's breast, looking at God, and raising its "leafy arms" to pray. The tree of the poem also has human physical attributes—it has a "hungry mouth", arms, hair (in which robins nest), and a bosom.

Rutgers-Newark English professor and poet Rachel Hadas described the poem as being "rather slight" although it "is free of irony and self consciousness, except that little reference to fools like me at the end, which I find kind of charming". Scholar Mark Royden Winchell points out that Kilmer's depiction of the tree indicates the possibility that he had several different people in mind because of the variety of anthropomorphic descriptions. Winchell posits that if the tree described were to be a single human being it would be "an anatomically deformed one".

In the second stanza, the tree is a sucking babe drawing nourishment from Mother Earth; in the third it is a supplicant reaching its leafy arms to the sky in prayer ... In the fourth stanza, the tree is a girl with jewels (a nest of robins) in her hair; and in the fifth, it is a chaste woman living alone with nature and with God. There is no warrant in the poem to say that it is different trees that remind the poet of these different types of people.

However, Winchell observes that this "series of fanciful analogies ... could be presented in any order without damaging the overall structure of his poem".

== Publication and reception ==
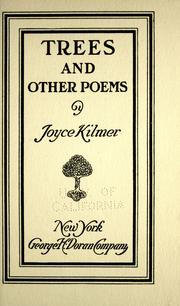
The cover of Joyce Kilmer's Trees and Other Poems, published in 1914

=== Publication ===
"Trees" was first published in the August 1913 issue of Poetry: A Magazine of Verse. The magazine, which had begun publishing the year before in Chicago, Illinois, quickly became the "principal organ for modern poetry of the English-speaking world" publishing the early works of poets who became the major influences on the development of twentieth-century literature (including T.S. Eliot, Ezra Pound, H.D., Wallace Stevens, Robert Frost and Edna St. Vincent Millay). Poetry paid Kilmer six dollars to print the poem, which was immediately successful. The following year, Kilmer included "Trees" in his collection Trees and Other Poems published by the George H. Doran Company.

Joyce Kilmer's reputation as a poet is staked largely on the widespread popularity of this one poem. "Trees" was liked immediately on first publication in Poetry: A Magazine of Verse; when Trees and Other Poems was published the following year, the review in Poetry focused on the "nursery rhyme" directness and simplicity of the poems, finding a particular childlike naivety in "Trees", which gave it "an unusual, haunting poignancy". However, the same review criticized the rest of the book, stating "much of the verse in this volume is very slight indeed."

Despite the enduring popular appeal of "Trees", most of Joyce Kilmer's works are largely unknown and have fallen into obscurity. A select few of his poems, including "Trees", are published frequently in anthologies. "Trees" began appearing in anthologies shortly after Kilmer's 1918 death, the first inclusion being Louis Untermeyer's Modern American Poetry (1919). Journalist and author Mark Forsyth ranks the first two lines of "Trees" as 26th out of 50 lines in an assessment of the "most quoted lines of poetry" as measured by Google hits.

=== Popular appeal ===
With "Trees", Kilmer was said to have "rediscovered simplicity", and the simplicity of its message and delivery is a source of its appeal. In 1962, English professor Barbara Garlitz of UC Berkeley recounted that her undergraduate students considered the poem as "one of the finest poems ever written, or at least a very good one"—even after its technical flaws were discussed—because of its simple message and that it "paints such lovely pictures". The students pointed to "how true the poem is", and it appealed to both her students' "romantic attitude towards nature" and their appreciation of life, nature, solace, and beauty because of its message that "the works of God completely overshadow our own feeble attempts at creation". Considering this sentiment, the enduring popularity of "Trees" is evinced by its association with annual Arbor Day observances and the planting of memorial trees as well as the several parks named in honor of Kilmer, including the Joyce Kilmer-Slickrock Wilderness and Joyce Kilmer Memorial Forest tracts within the Nantahala National Forest in Graham County, North Carolina.

"Trees" has been described by literary critic Guy Davenport as "the one poem known by practically everybody". According to journalist Rick Hampson, "Trees" was "memorized and recited by generations of students ... It comforted troops in the trenches of World War I. It was set to music and set in stone, declaimed in opera houses and vaudeville theaters, intoned at ceremonies each April on Arbor Day." According to Robert Holliday, Kilmer's friend and editor, "Trees" speaks "with authentic song to the simplest of hearts". Holliday added that this "exquisite title poem now so universally known made his reputation more than all the rest he had written put together" and was "made for immediate widespread popularity".

=== Critical reception ===
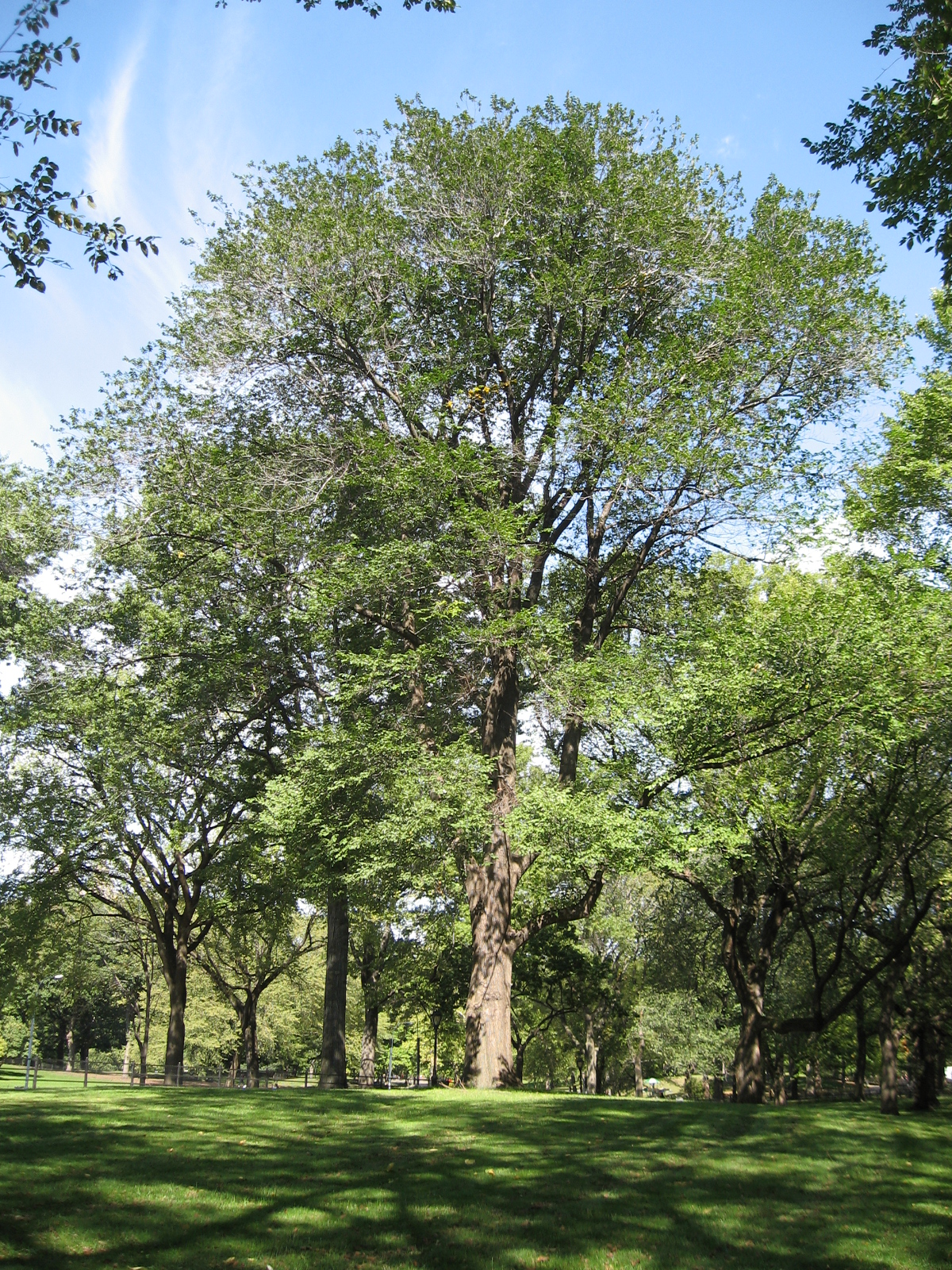
The Joyce Kilmer Tree in New York City's Central Park, located near several World War I monuments, planted after the poet's death

Several critics—including both Kilmer's contemporaries and modern scholars—have disparaged Kilmer's work as being too religious, simple, and overly sentimental and suggested that his style was far too traditional, even archaic. Poet Conrad Aiken, a contemporary of Kilmer, lambasted his work as being unoriginal—merely "imitative with a sentimental bias" and "trotting out of the same faint passions, the same old heartbreaks and love songs, ghostly distillations of fragrances all too familiar". Aiken characterized Kilmer as a "dabbler in the pretty and sweet" and "pale-mouthed clingers to the artificial and archaic".

Kilmer is considered among the last of the Romantic era poets because his verse is conservative and traditional in style and breaks no formal rule of poetics—a style often criticized today for being too sentimental to be taken seriously. The entire corpus of Kilmer's work was produced between 1909 and 1918 when Romanticism and sentimental lyric poetry fell out of favor and Modernism took root—especially with the influence of the Lost Generation. In the years after Kilmer's death, poetry went in drastically different directions, as is seen in the work of T. S. Eliot and Ezra Pound, and academic criticism grew with it to eschew the more sentimental and straightforward verse.

The poem was criticized by Cleanth Brooks and Robert Penn Warren in their textbook Understanding Poetry first published in 1938. Brooks and Warren were two of the major contributors to the New Criticism movement. New Criticism proponents analyzed poetry on its aesthetic formulae and excluded reader's response, the author's intention, historical and cultural contexts, and moralistic bias from their analysis. They attributed the popularity of "Trees" largely to its religious appeal and believed it was a "stock response that has nothing to do, as such, with poetry", adding:

It praises God and appeals to a religious sentiment. Therefore, people who do not stop to look at the poem itself or to study the images in the poem and think about what the poem really says, are inclined to accept the poem because of the pious sentiment, the prettified little pictures (which in themselves appeal to stock responses), and the mechanical rhythm.

Literary critic Mark Royden Winchell believed that Brooks and Warren's criticism of Kilmer's poem was chiefly to demonstrate that "it is sometimes possible to learn as much about poetry from bad poems as from good ones".

== Refuted claims regarding inspiration ==
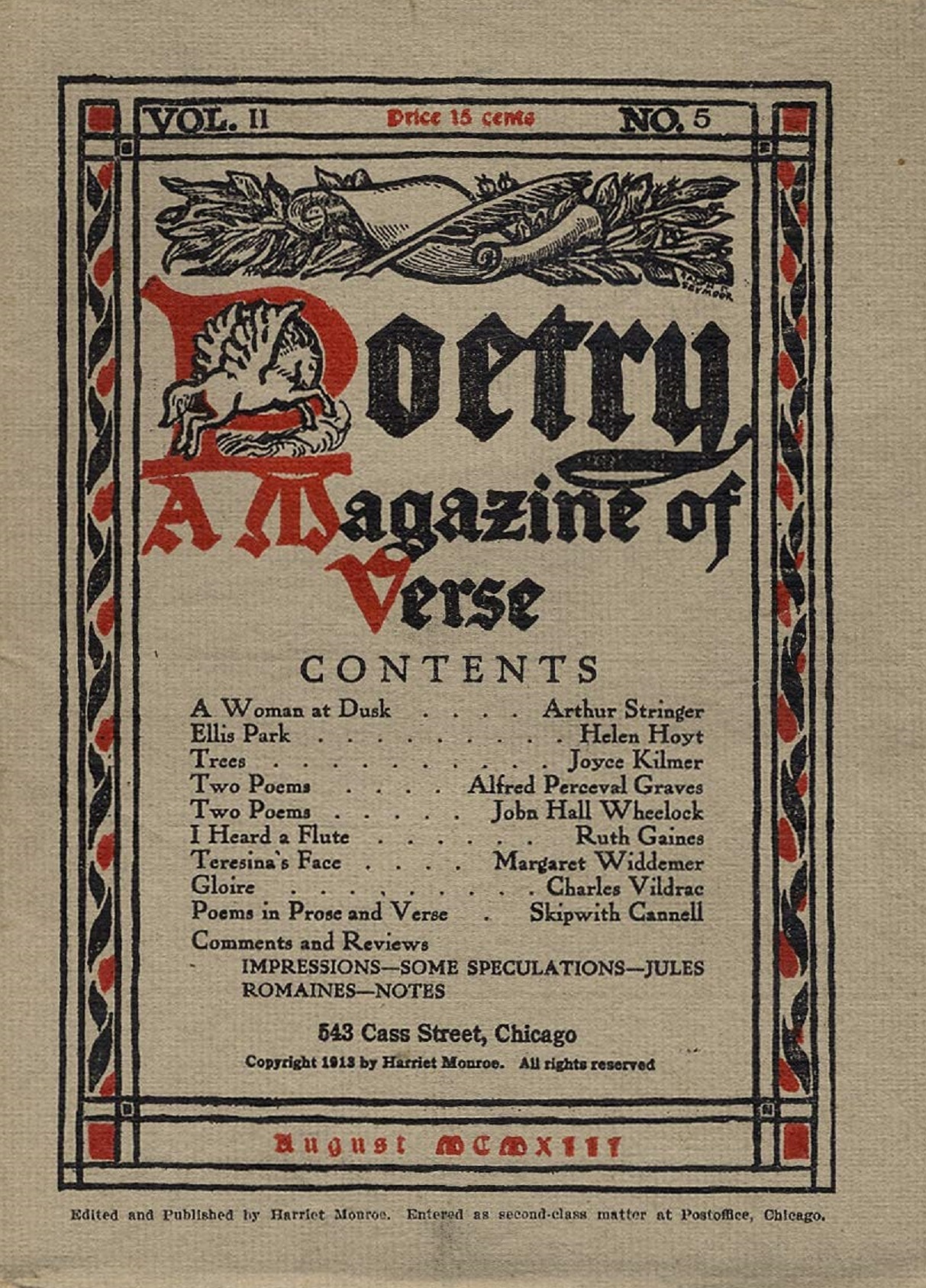
First published in the August, 1913 issue of Poetry: A Magazine of Verse, Chicago.

Due to the enduring popular appeal of "Trees", several local communities and organizations across the United States have staked their claim to the genesis of the poem. While the accounts of family members and of documents firmly establish Mahwah being the place where Kilmer wrote the poem, several towns throughout the country have claimed that Kilmer wrote "Trees" while staying there or that a specific tree in their town inspired Kilmer's writing. Local tradition in Swanzey, New Hampshire, asserts without proof that Kilmer wrote the poem while summering in the town. Montague, Massachusetts, claims that either "a sprawling maple dominated the grounds near a hospital where Kilmer once was treated" or "a spreading maple in the yard of an old mansion" inspired the poem.

In New Brunswick, New Jersey, Kilmer's hometown, the claim involved a large white oak on the Cook College campus (now the School of Environmental and Biological Sciences), at Rutgers University. This tree, the "Kilmer Oak", was estimated to be over 300 years old. Because it had been weakened by age and disease, the Kilmer Oak was removed in 1963, and in reporting by The New York Times and other newspapers the local tradition was repeated with the claim that "Rutgers said it could not prove that Kilmer had been inspired by the oak." Currently, saplings from acorns of the historic tree are being grown at the site, throughout the Middlesex County and central New Jersey, as well as in major arboretums around the United States. The remains of the original Kilmer Oak are presently kept in storage at Rutgers University.

Because of Kilmer's close identification with Roman Catholicism and his correspondence with many priests and theologians, a tree located near a grotto dedicated to the Virgin Mary at the University of Notre Dame in South Bend, Indiana, has been asserted as the inspiration for the poem. According to Dorothy Corson, the claim was first made by a priest named Henry Kemper. There are several accounts that Kilmer visited the campus of Notre Dame to lecture and to visit friends, but none of these accounts or occasions date before 1914.

In his 1997 book of essays entitled The Geography of the Imagination, American writer Guy Davenport suggests a different inspiration for Kilmer's poem.

Trees were favorite symbols for Yeats, Frost, and even the young Pound. ... But Kilmer had been reading about trees in another context[,] the movement to stop child labor and set up nursery schools in slums. ... Margaret McMillan ... had the happy idea that a breath of fresh air and an intimate acquaintance with grass and trees were worth all the pencils and desks in the whole school system. ... The English word for gymnasium equipment is 'apparatus.' And in her book Labour and Childhood (1907) you will find this sentence: 'Apparatus can be made by fools, but only God can make a tree.'

It appears that Davenport must have loosely and erroneously paraphrased the sentiments expressed by McMillan, as this exact quote does not appear in her text. Instead, McMillan is expressing the observation that several nineteenth-century writers, including William Rankin, William Morris and Thomas Carlyle, opposed the effects of machinery on society and craftsmanship and thus eschewed machine-made items. Davenport's observation likely was derived in some way from McMillan's examination and quotation of Carlyle:

He (Carlyle) often makes comparisons between men and machines, and even trees and machines, greatly to the disadvantage of the latter. For example, 'O, that we could displace the machine god and put a man god in his place!' and 'I find no similitude of life so true as this of a tree! Beautiful! Machine of the universe!'

== Adaptations and parodies ==
=== Musical adaptations ===
Several of Kilmer's poems, including "Trees", were set to music and published in England by Kilmer's mother, Annie Kilburn Kilmer, who was a writer and amateur composer. The more popular musical setting of Kilmer's poem was composed in 1922 by American pianist and composer Oscar Rasbach. This setting had been performed and recorded frequently in twentieth century, including Ernestine Schumann-Heink, John Charles Thomas, Nelson Eddy, Robert Merrill, Perry Como, and Paul Robeson. Rasbach's song appeared on popular network television shows, including All in the Family, performed by the puppets Wayne and Wanda in The Muppet Show, and as an animated feature segment featuring Fred Waring and the Pennsylvanians performing the song in the 1948 animated film Melody Time, the last of the short-film anthology features produced by Walt Disney, showing bucolic scenes seen through the changing of the seasons, this version noticeably features a break between the third and fourth stanzas to facilitate a storm scene.

Rasbach's setting has also been lampooned, most notably in the Our Gang short film Arbor Day (1936), directed by Fred C. Newmeyer, in which Alfalfa (played by Carl Switzer), sings the song in a whiny, strained voice after a "woodsman, spare that tree" dialogue with Spanky (George McFarland). Film critic Leonard Maltin has called this "the poem's all-time worst rendition". In his album Caught in the Act, Victor Borge, when playing requests, responds to a member of the audience: "Sorry I don't know that 'Doggie in the Window'. I know one that comes pretty close to it" and proceeds to play the Rasbach setting of "Trees".

Dutch composer Henk van der Vliet included a setting of "Trees" as the third in a set of five songs written in 1977, which included texts by poets Christina Rossetti, Percy Bysshe Shelley, Kilmer, Matthew Prior, and Sir John Suckling.

=== Parodies ===
Because of the varied reception to Kilmer's poem and its simple rhyme and meter, it has been the model for several parodies written by humorists and poets alike. While keeping with Kilmer's iambic tetrameter rhythm and its couplet rhyme scheme, and references to the original poem's thematic material, such parodies are often immediately recognizable, as is seen in "Song of the Open Road" written by poet and humorist Ogden Nash: "I think that I shall never see / A billboard lovely as a tree. / Indeed, unless the billboards fall, / I'll never see a tree at all."

"Chee$e"

I think that we should never freeze
Such lively assets as our cheese.
The sucker's hungry mouth is pressed
Against the cheese's caraway breast.
...
Poems are nought but warmed-up breeze.
DOLLARS are made by Trappist Cheese.

A similar sentiment was expressed in a 1968 episode of the animated series Wacky Races titled "The Wrong Lumber Race", where the villainous Dick Dastardly chops down a tree and uses it as a roadblock against the other racers, declaring proudly: "I think that I shall never see / A roadblock lovely as a tree."

Further, Trappist monk, poet and spiritual writer Thomas Merton used Kilmer's poem as a model for a parody called "Chee$e"—with a dollar sign purposefully substituted for the letter "s"—in which Merton ridiculed the lucrative sale of homemade cheese by his monastery, the Abbey of Gethsemani in Kentucky. This poem was not published during Merton's lifetime. Merton often criticized the "commodification of monastic life and business for a profit", claiming that it affected the well-being of the spirit. In his poem, Merton attributed his parody to "Joyce Killer-Diller".

from Superman II

LUTHOR: ... Give me another one...
(EVE, hands him another crystal at random. LUTHOR shoves it in the mechanism - JOR-EL reappears.)
JOR-EL: Education crystal 108. Earth Culture. A typical ode, much loved by the people you will live among, Kal-El. "Trees" by Joyce Kilmer. "I think that I shall never see a poem as lovely as a tree; a tree whose branches wide and strong..."
(LUTHOR, to his credit, quickly yanks the tape out.)
LUTHOR: Good god!
EVE: Hey wait! I love "Trees."
LUTHOR: So does the average Cocker Spaniel.

Like Kilmer, Merton was a graduate of Columbia University and a member of its literary society, the Philolexian Society, which has hosted the annual Joyce Kilmer Memorial Bad Poetry Contest since 1986. "Trees" is read at the conclusion of each year's event.

Kilmer's poem was recited in the 1980 film Superman II, as well as its 2006 director's cut. In the scene, villain Lex Luthor (played by Gene Hackman) and others enter Superman's Fortress of Solitude and comes across a video of an elder (John Hollis) from planet Krypton reciting "Trees" as an example of "poetry from Earth literature". (Note: The original footage filmed by director Richard Donner before he was fired from the production featured Marlon Brando (playing as Superman's father Jor-El). Brando's scenes were not included in the 1980 theatrical release due to ongoing financial and contractual disputes between Brando and the producers. Lester reshot Brando's scenes with Hollis. Brando's scenes were restored for the re-edited director's cut Superman II: The Richard Donner Cut released in 2006 that featured Donner's original vision for the film. For a comparison of the two versions of the film, see: Wheeler, Jeremy. AMG Review: Superman II: The Richard Donner Cut - Critics' Reviews. Retrieved July 21, 2013.) Luthor ridicules the poem.

In an episode of Mayberry RFD, Aunt Bee protests a road project with a pastiche of the poem, ending in the lines "Poems are writ by simple folk / But only God can make an oak!"

In "The Simpsons Spin-Off Showcase", a poem is read by Hans Moleman: "I think that I shall never see, my cataracts are blinding me."

On the Smothers Brothers' Mom Always Liked You Best! album, Tommy Smothers recites his own humorous rendition.

Webcomic artist Zach Weinersmith plays on an inherent contradiction in Kilmer's poem: "I think that I shall never see / a poem lovely as a tree. // Except for this one's sweet refrains; / let's print them on a tree's remains".

In The Cannonball Run, nature-loving Farrah Fawcett recites the poem to Burt Reynolds, who corrects her that Joyce Kilmer is a "he" (despite the name Joyce).
