= The Pooh Perplex =

1963 book by Frederick Crews

- First hardcover edition
- Author: Frederick Crews
- Publisher: E. P. Dutton (US)
- Publication date: 1963
- Followed by: Postmodern Pooh

The Pooh Perplex is a 1963 book by Frederick Crews that includes essays on Winnie-the-Pooh as a satire of literary criticism. Crews published a sequel in 2001, Postmodern Pooh.

== Background, writing, and publication ==
Frederick Crews was an American essayist and literary critic. When he published The Pooh Perplex, he was teaching English at the University of California, Berkeley. In the 1960s, he sought to write a work that criticized common styles of literary criticism at the time, namely critics allowing their own biases to shape their interpretations of a work, as well as casebooks. According to a 2002 interview Crews gave to NPR, he chose Winnie-the-Pooh (1926) to be the subject of his book because it was widely read and "very transparent[...] so that it [could] be exploited by all these critics." Crews wrote twelve essays on the book under various pseudonyms that 'analyzed' the book through various lenses such as Marxism.

The book was first published by E. P. Dutton in 1963.

== Content ==
The book includes twelve essays by fictional critics (all Crews writing under pseudonyms), from the points of view of critics such as a Marxist, Freudian, and New Critic.

== Reception ==
Crews, in his 2002 interview with NPR, said that the book was well received, even by the community of literary critics it was satirizing. A 1964 review published in College Composition and Communication felt that the book would be difficult to read in one sitting, but was "a tonic for those of us who read literary criticism and may be therapeutic for those who write it." The CEA Critic published a satirical review by Richard L. Greene, who demanded that the book not be stocked in college bookstores lest it encourage people to start making fun of myths or archetypes. Robert M. Adams in The Virginia Quarterly Review felt that the book tried to do too much with twelve essays "about nothing at all" and that, while Crews made some valid points, he had been too indiscriminate in "clubbing" literary criticism "to death".

In The New York Times, Orville Prescott deemed Crews' work "the most brilliant volume of parodies since the publication of Max Beerbohm's A Christmas Garland." Prescott positively received all of the essays, writing that he considered them necessary reading for those involved in literary criticism, although they might not appeal to the general public, and noted that R. P. Blackmur, Leslie Fiedler and F. R. Leavis were clearly targeted by them. He concluded that it was "not only a triumph of ridiculous parody. It is also a fine demonstration that a critic with no humor and little common sense can make any given work of literature mean absolutely anything."

Writing in The Canberra Times, Patricia Croft praised it, writing, "The book will give pleasure to many (not all) academics; there should be no need to prescribe it for undergraduates."

The academic Alison Lurie wrote in 1991 that The Pooh Perplex made writing about Winnie-the-Pooh "awkward (if not impossible)" because he had "said most of what could be said about Pooh" in his satirical works, making it hard for critics to conduct serious analysis. She notes that his work "stifle[d] almost all critical comment on Winnie-the-Pooh for almost a decade." Four years later, Paula T. Connolly also noted the work's side-effect of stifling critical analysis of Pooh as critics feared sounding like those Crews was satirizing. It has since led many critics to simply dismiss Milne's children's work as lacking depth. Connolly wrote in 1995, however, that the "freeze [...] seems to be thawing".
