= The Minority Press =

Defunct British publisher (1930–1933)

Emblem of The Minority Press printed in Edwards' "Plagiarism. An Essay on Good and Bad Borrowing" (1933). A bean sprout, perhaps representing organic growth, rises above the letter 'M'

The Minority Press was a short-lived British publishing house founded in 1930 by Gordon Fraser (1911–1981) while he was an undergraduate student at St John's College, Cambridge. Fraser was an undergraduate student of F. R. Leavis. The Minority Press was essentially the book publishing arm of the Leavis camp of literary criticism. The Press published a series of six pamphlets, several reprint editions with new introductions, and a few longer essays on literary topics.

The first publication of the Press was Leavis' manifesto, Mass Civilization and Minority Culture (1930). Most of the other initial authors were fellow Cambridge students. Its last publication was in 1933.

At least some of the titles were printed by W. Heffer and Sons, Ltd. Cambridge, England.

== Origin of the name ==
The name of the press comes from Leavis' self-positioning as a literary critic upholding a minority – rather than a mass culture – stance; against an "anything goes" pluralism. Leavis wrote that

The potentialities of human experience in any age are realised by only a tiny minority, and the important poet is important because he belongs to this (and has also, of course, the power of communication) ... Almost all of us live by routine, and are not fully aware of what we feel; or, if that seems paradoxical, we do not express to ourselves an account of our possibilities of experience ... The poet is unusually sensitive, unusually aware, more sincere and more himself than the ordinary man can be. He knows what he feels and knows what he is interested in. He is a poet because his interest in his experience is not separable from his interest in words."

== Excerpts from Leavis' Mass Civilization and Minority Culture ==
"In any period it is upon a very small minority that the discerning appreciation of art and literature depends: it is (apart from cases of the simple and familiar) only a few who are capable of unprompted, first-hand judgment. They are still a small minority, though a larger one, who are capable of endorsing such first-hand judgment by genuine personal response. ….. The minority capable not only of appreciating Dante, Shakespeare, Donne, Baudelaire, Hardy (to take major instances) but of recognising their latest successors constitute the consciousness of the race (or of a branch of it) at a given time. For such capacity does not belong merely to an isolated aesthetic realm: it implies responsiveness to theory as well as to art, to science and philosophy in so far as these may affect the sense of the human situation and of the nature of life. Upon this minority depends our power of profiting by the finest human experience of the past; they keep alive the subtlest and most perishable parts of tradition. Upon them depend the implicit standards that order the finer living of an age, the sense that this is worth more than that, this rather than that is the direction in which to go, that the centre is here rather than there. In their keeping, to use a metaphor that is metonymy also and will bear a good deal of pondering, is the language, the changing idiom, upon which fine living depends, and without which distinction of spirit is thwarted and incoherent, By culture I mean the use of such a language. (pp. 1–2)

"There seems every reason to believe that the average cultivated person of a century ago was a very much more competent reader than his modern representative. Not only does the modern dissipate himself upon so much more reading of all kinds the task of acquiring discrimination is much more difficult, A reader who grew up with Wordsworth moved among a limited set of signals (so to speak): the variety was not overwhelming. So he was able to acquire discrimination as he went along. But the modern is exposed to a concourse of signals so bewildering in their variety and number that, unless he is especially gifted or especially favoured, he can hardly begin to discriminate. Here we have the plight of culture in general. The landmarks have shifted, multiplied and crowded upon one another, the distinctions and dividing lines have blurred away, the boundaries are gone, and the arts and literatures of different countries and periods have flowed together, so that, if we revert to the metaphor of "language" for culture, we way, to describe it, adapt the sentence in which Mr. T. S. Eliot describes the intellectual situation: "When there is so much to be known, when there are so many fields of knowledge in which the same words are used with different meanings, when every one knows a little about a great many things, it becomes increasingly difficult for anyone to know whether he knows what he is talking about or not." (pp. 18–19)

== Publications of this house ==
=== The Minority Pamphlets ===
1. F. R. Leavis Mass Civilization and Minority Culture, Minority Pamphlet No. 1, cover design by Raymond McGrath. Gordon Fraser, The Minority Press: Cambridge, 1930.
2. Theodore Francis Powys (1875–1953) Uriah on the Hill. A short story. Cambridge: The Minority Press, 1930. 20pp Cover design by Raymond McGrath, BArch, A.R.I.B.A Limited to 85 copies.
3. William Hunter The Novels and Stories of T.F. Powys. Cambridge, Minority Press, 1930. 34pp.
4. John Middleton Murry D H Lawrence (Two essays) ["The Doctrine of D H Lawrence" (review of Lady Chatterley's Lover) and "The Poems of D H Lawrence]. Cover design by Raymond McGrath. Pamphlet No. 4. 15 pp. 1930.
5. R. P. Blackmur Dirty hands or the true-born censor. The Minority Press; Gordon Fraser at St. John's College Cambridge 1930. "Minority Pamphlet No. 5" in the publisher's series; pp. 15.
6. F. R. Leavis D.H. Lawrence, Pamphlet No. 6. 33 pp., illustration by Raymond McGrath. Gordon Fraser, The Minority Press: Cambridge, 1932.

=== The Reprint Series ===
- Mark Van Doren The Poetry of John Dryden. Introduction by Bonamy Dobrée (Repr.& Rev. Ed.) Gordon Fraser, The Minority Press: 1931 299pp.
- Henry Fielding "An Apology for the Life of Mrs. Shamela Andrews". With an introduction by Brian W. Downs.
- Norman Angell The Press and the Organization of Society. Revised reprint, Cambridge, The Minority Press, 1933. 70pp
- F. R. Leavis For Continuity, Gordon Fraser, The Minority Press: Cambridge, 1933. Opens with Leavis' "Mass Civilization and Minority Culture". Essays from Leavis' literary magazine, Scrutiny. 219pp

=== Original literary works ===
- Ronald Bottrall The Loosening and Other Poems, The Minority Press: Cambridge, 1931. 53 pp. Raymond McGrath, cover designer.
- Edward Meryon Wilson (translator) The Solitudes of Don Luis de Góngora Introduction by Rudder. Gordon Fraser, The Minority Press: 1931. Portions of this translation had previously been printed in Experiment, Cambridge Poetry – 1929 and in Criterion. Portions were republished in a Doubleday paperback and in Renaissance and Baroque Lyrics (Harold Martin Priest, editor). An unauthorised reprint with many errors was published by Las Americas Press in 1965 and 'disowned' by Wilson. A revised version was published in 1965 (Cambridge U. Press)
- F. R. Leavis How to Teach Reading: A Primer for Ezra Pound, Gordon Fraser, The Minority Press: Cambridge, 1932. 49pp. This was a response to Ezra Pound's How to Read (1931)
- Lionel Charles Knights How Many Children Had Lady Macbeth? An Essay in the Theory and Practice of Shakespeare Criticism, 1933
- William Allan Edwards Plagiarism. An Essay on Good and Bad Borrowing, Gordon Fraser, The Minority Press: Cambridge, 1933. 1000 copies.
