= The Great Pursuit =

1977 novel by Tom Sharpe

- First edition
- Author: Tom Sharpe
- Language: English
- Genre: Humour/satire
- Publisher: Secker & Warburg
- Publication date: 1977
- Publication place: United Kingdom

The Great Pursuit is a 1977 comic novel by Tom Sharpe. It is a satire encompassing commercialism in publishing and literary criticism.

== Plot introduction ==
The story is a farce about greed in the publishing world, and the struggle between literature as a high art and the commercial imperative to reduce it to its lowest common denominator. The action takes place in London, New York City, the Deep South and the Maine coast.

== Plot summary ==
Frensic and Futtle is a small and successful literary agency. But following a successful court case by a woman who claimed to have been libelled by one of their authors, the agency rapidly loses business.

One day, a manuscript for a book called Pause O Men for the Virgin arrives at the agency, together with a note from the author's solicitor, saying that the author wishes to remain anonymous and that the agency has carte blanche on how it deals with the book. The book turns out to deal with the love affair between an 80-year-old woman and a 17-year-old youth.

The populist American publisher Hutchmeyer agrees to sign a deal to publish the book in the United States for $2 million, providing the author carries out a promotional tour of the country. Sonia and Frensic decide to use aspiring but unpublished author Peter Piper to stand in for the anonymous author. But when Piper receives a proof copy of Pause from the publisher by mistake, it takes a certain amount of persuasion and arm-twisting from Sonia Futtle to convince Piper to travel to America.

== Characters in The Great Pursuit ==
Frederick Frensic is something of an anachronism, adhering to styles and habits of the 18th century. He runs a London literary agency, Frensic and Futtle, with Sonia Futtle. He is known for having a nose for successful authors, but he attributes his success to knowing what the public wants.

Sonia Futtle is Frensic's partner in the agency. An American, she has a very forceful personality and has a reputation as a persuasive saleswoman.

Peter Piper is a struggling and unpublished author, who has been writing the same book, Search for a Lost Childhood, for at least 10 years. He has a very strong conviction that literature is a worthy and high art, and deplores trash fiction and the dumbing down of commercial fiction. He only reads what he considers the great authors, and borrows the style of the author he is currently reading for the latest draft of his book.

Hutchmeyer is a brash American publisher, known for publishing unremittingly commercial books. He never reads the books he publishes, and considers authors to be useless members of society, good only for helping him make money.

Baby Hutchmeyer is Hutchmeyer's long suffering wife. Unlike her husband, she is well read and worldly, although she longs to be free of her life as what she sees as a rich man's plaything, and is tired of her husband's infidelities.

== Title ==
The book's title refers to a textbook by Dr Sydney Louth, under whom Frensic read English Literature at Oxford. This is a thinly disguised reference to real life critic F. R. Leavis, author of The Great Tradition and The Common Pursuit.

== Adaptations ==
BBC Radio 4 broadcast a 4-part adaptation of The Great Pursuit in 2005, with Sandra Dickinson as Baby Hutchmeyer, Mark Heap as Frensic, Laurel Lefkow as Sonia Futtle and Adam Godley as Peter Piper.
