= Lee W. Patterson =

American medievalist (1940–2012)

Lee W. Patterson (May 14, 1940 – June 29, 2012) was an American medievalist, primarily of Chaucer. He finished his PhD at Yale in 1968, then taught at the University of Toronto, Johns Hopkins, Duke, and Yale. He retired from Yale as Frederick W. Hilles Professor Emeritus of English in 2009. He is known for his historicist approach to medieval literature, which "transformed the field."

While at the University of Toronto, he was involved with an Ontario Tenants' Association and the Ontario New Democratic Party.

== Books ==
- Negotiating the Past: The Historical Understanding of Medieval Literature (1987)
- Chaucer and the Subject of History (1991); awarded Christian Gauss Prize for the Best Book of Literary Criticism by Phi Beta Kappa
- Putting the Wife in Her Place (1995) William Matthews Lectures. London: Birkbeck College
- Temporal Circumstances: Form and History in the Canterbury Tales (2006) New York: Palgrave Macmillan
- Acts of Recognition: Essays on Medieval Culture (2009) Notre Dame: Notre Dame University Press
