= Frederick Crews =

American essayist and literary critic (1933–2024)

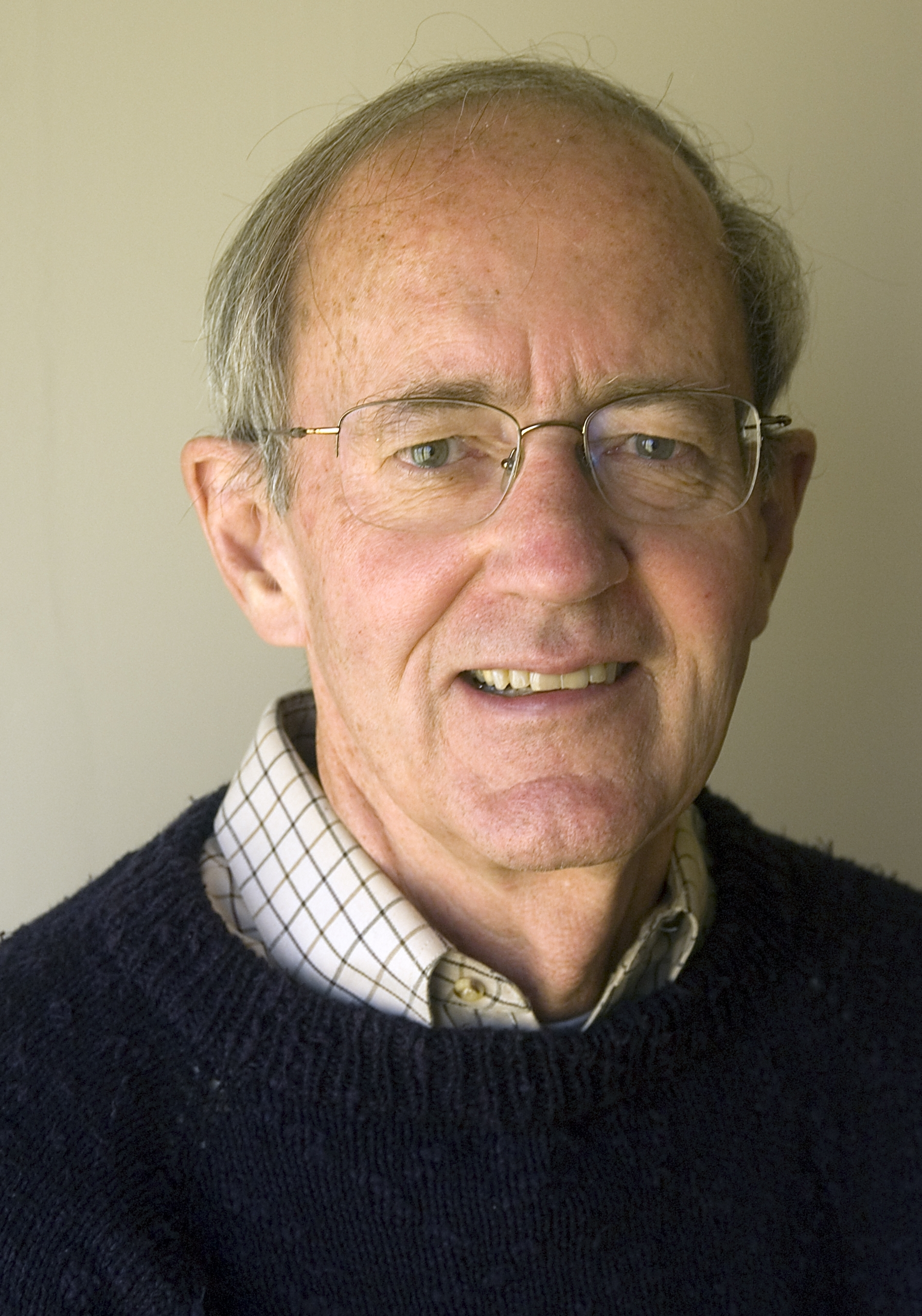
- Crews in 2005
- Born: February 20, 1933; Philadelphia, Pennsylvania, U.S.
- Died: June 21, 2024 (aged 91); Oakland, California, U.S.
- Education: Yale University (BA); Princeton University (PhD)

Frederick Campbell Crews (February 20, 1933 – June 21, 2024) was an American essayist and literary critic. Professor of English at the University of California, Berkeley, Crews was the author of numerous books, including The Tragedy of Manners: Moral Drama in the Later Novels of Henry James (1957), E. M. Forster: The Perils of Humanism (1962), and The Sins of the Fathers: Hawthorne's Psychological Themes (1966), a discussion of the work of Nathaniel Hawthorne. He received popular attention for The Pooh Perplex (1963), a book of satirical essays parodying various schools of literary criticism. Initially a proponent of psychoanalytic literary criticism, Crews later rejected psychoanalysis, becoming a critic of Sigmund Freud and his scientific and ethical standards. Crews was a prominent participant in the "Freud wars" of the 1980s and 1990s, a debate over the reputation, scholarship, and impact on the 20th century of Freud, who founded psychoanalysis. In 2017, he published Freud: The Making of an Illusion.

Crews published a variety of skeptical and rationalist essays, including book reviews and commentary for The New York Review of Books, on a variety of topics including Freud and recovered memory therapy, some of which were published in The Memory Wars (1995). He also published successful handbooks for college writers, such as The Random House Handbook.

== Life and career ==
=== Personal life and death ===
Crews was born in suburban Philadelphia on February 10, 1933. Both his parents were avid readers and were quite influential in his life, said Crews: "They had both been raised in considerable poverty, and books had been extremely important to them personally, in shaping them. My mother was very literary; my father was very scientific. I feel that I got a little something of both sides." In high school, Crews was co-captain of the tennis team, and for decades he remained an avid skier, hiker, swimmer, and runner. Crews lived in Berkeley with his wife, Elizabeth Crews, a photographer who was born and raised in Berkeley, California. They had two daughters and four grandchildren.

Crews died in Oakland, California on June 21, 2024, at the age of 91.

=== Education ===
Crews completed his undergraduate education at Yale University in 1955. Though his degree was in English, Crews entered the Directed Studies program during his first two years at Yale, which he describes as his greatest experience because the program was taught by a coordinated faculty and required students to distribute their courses among sciences, social sciences, literature, and philosophy. He received his PhD in literature from Princeton University in 1958. Crews cited Fyodor Dostoyevsky, Friedrich Nietzsche, Hawthorne, and Freud as major influences during his time at Princeton.

=== Career ===
In 1958, Crews joined the UC Berkeley English Department, where he taught for 36 years before retiring as its chair in 1994. He was a Fulbright scholar with a lectureship at University of Turin in Italy for the 1961–1962 academic year.

Crews was an anti-war activist from 1965 to about 1970 and advocated draft resistance as co-chair of Berkeley's Faculty Peace Committee. Though he shared the widespread assumption during the mid-1960s that psychoanalytic theory was a valid account of human motivation and was one of the first academics to apply that theory systematically to the study of literature, Crews gradually came to regard psychoanalysis as a pseudoscience. This convinced him that his loyalty should not belong to any theory but rather to empirical standards and the skeptical point of view. Throughout his career, Crews brought his concern for rational discourse to the study of various issues, from the controversy over recovered memory, the credibility of the Rorschach test, and belief in alien abductions to Theosophy and "intelligent design." He also advocated for clear writing based on standards of sound argument and rhetorical effectiveness rather than adherence to rigid school-book rules. "What interests me is general rationality," said Crews in an interview:

General rationality requires us to observe the world carefully, to consider alternative hypotheses to our own hypotheses, to gather evidence in a responsible way, to answer objections. These are habits of mind that science shares with good history, good sociology, good political science, good economics, what have you. And I summarize all this in what I call the "empirical attitude." It's a combination of feeling responsible to the evidence that is available, feeling responsible to go out and find that evidence, including the evidence that is contrary to one's presumptions, and responsibility to be logical with one's self and others. And this is an ideal that is not so much individual as social. The rational attitude doesn't really work when simply applied to one's self. It is something that we owe to each other.

== Publications ==
=== Satire ===
In 1963, Crews published his first bestseller The Pooh Perplex: A Student Casebook that satirized the type of casebooks then assigned to first-year university students in introductory literature and composition courses. The book featured a fictitious set of English professors writing essays on A. A. Milne's classic character Winnie-the-Pooh, parodying Marxist, Freudian, Christian, Leavisite and Fiedlerian approaches to analyzing literary texts. Though urged by readers to publish a follow-up volume, Crews delayed writing one until after his retirement in 1994, producing Postmodern Pooh in 2001. While The Pooh Perplex parodies earlier trends in literary criticism, Postmodern Pooh parodies later trends in literary theory. In it, Crews extends the satire of the original, covering more recent critical approaches such as deconstruction, feminism, queer theory, and recovered memory therapy, in part basing the essay authors and their approaches on actual academics and their work.

In The Patch Commission (1968), Crews satirized the activities of Presidential Commissions, displaying his disapproval of American involvement in the then-ongoing Vietnam War. The book is a transcription of the work of the fictional Patch Commission, a discussion among three government commissioners attempting to save the nation from disaster caused by pediatrician Benjamin Spock's overly permissive child-rearing guidelines.

=== Literary criticism ===
Much of Crews's career was dedicated to literary criticism. Crews's first book, The Tragedy of Manners: Moral Drama in the Later Novels of Henry James (1957), was based on a prize-winning essay written by Crews while an undergraduate student at Yale University, initially published as part of a series. In the book, Crews discussed three late novels by Henry James: The Ambassadors (1903), The Wings of the Dove (1902), and The Golden Bowl (1904), analyzing how, in those novels, adherence to social conventions serves to keep hidden relationships from coming to light.

In 1962, Crews's doctoral dissertation from Princeton University was published as E. M. Forster: The Perils of Humanism. In 1966, he published a study of Hawthorne, The Sins of the Fathers: Hawthorne's Psychological Themes, in which he examined Hawthorne's entire literary career including unfinished novels; it was re-issued in 1989 with Crews's reassessment of his initial position and an analysis of how literary criticism had dealt with Hawthorne since 1966. In 1970, Crews edited Psychoanalysis and Literary Process, a collection of essays by his students that analyzed a variety of authors from a psychoanalytic perspective; a review by Jose Barchilon credited the book with important accomplishments, including being "an achievement in the teaching and learning of psychoanalysis in a department of literature", which the reviewer noted was a "rare occurrence". The collection included an essay, "Anaesthetic Criticism," in which Crews disparaged contemporary schools of literary criticism, especially that of Northrop Frye and his followers.

In 1986, Crews published The Critics Bear It Away, which was wholly devoted to literary criticism. It was nominated for the National Book Critics Circle Award for nonfiction and won the Spielvogel-Diamonstein Award for the Art of the Essay.

Parts of Crews's 1975 collection Out of My System, the 1986 collection Skeptical Engagements, and the 2006 Follies of the Wise were also dedicated to literary criticism. Crews's repeated message to literary critics is to be critical of their own interpretation when making statements about the meaning of a work. Regarding Crews's position on literary criticism, C. A. Runcie notes, "What Frederick Crews says about psychoanalysis is true for all criticism and its theorizing: 'A critic's sense of limits, like Freud's own, must come from … his awe at how little he can explain.'" Crews has been identified by the literary theorist Joseph Carroll as one of "the very few scholars who have consistently and effectively opposed poststructuralism."

=== Criticism of Freud and psychoanalysis ===
Crews began his career using psychoanalytic literary criticism but gradually rejected this approach and psychoanalysis in general. In his article "Reductionism and Its Discontents", published in Out of My System in 1975, Crews stated his belief that psychoanalysis can be usefully applied to literary criticism but expressed growing doubts about its use as a therapeutic approach, suggesting that it had a weak, sometimes comical tradition of criticism. In 1977, Crews read the draft of a work by the philosopher Adolf Grünbaum that later became The Foundations of Psychoanalysis, and helped Grünbaum to obtain a publication offer from the University of California Press. In 1996, Crews credited the psychiatrist Henri F. Ellenberger's The Discovery of the Unconscious (1970) with beginning a twenty-five-year-long reevaluation of the position of psychoanalysis within the history of medicine, and acknowledged other book-length critical analyses of Freud and psychotherapy, including Frank Sulloway's Freud, Biologist of the Mind (1979), Grünbaum's The Foundations of Psychoanalysis (1984), and Malcolm Macmillan's Freud Evaluated: The Completed Arc (1991). Crews wrote the foreword to the revised 1997 edition of Freud Evaluated, suggesting that its republication "advanced the long debate over psychoanalysis to what may well be its decisive moment".

Crews, who described himself as "a one-time Freudian who had decided to help others resist the fallacies to which I had succumbed in the 1960s", sees his criticisms of Freud as two-pronged – one aimed at Freud's ethical and scientific standards, and the other aimed at showing that psychoanalysis is a pseudoscience.

==== The ″Freud Wars″ ====
Crews rejected psychoanalysis entirely in his article "Analysis Terminable" (first published in Commentary in July 1980 and reprinted in his collection Skeptical Engagements in 1986), citing what he considered its faulty methodology, its ineffectiveness as therapy, and the harm it caused to patients. In 1985, Crews reviewed The Foundations of Psychoanalysis in The New Republic.

Two of Crews's essays, "Analysis Terminable" and "The Unknown Freud," (the latter published in 1993), have been described as shots fired during the "Freud Wars," a long-running debate over Freud's reputation, work and impact. "The Unknown Freud" prompted an unprecedented number of letters to The New York Review of Books for several issues.

Crews went on to criticize Freud and psychoanalysis extensively, becoming a major figure in the discussions and criticisms of Freud that occurred during the 1980s and 1990s. Crews was one of almost fifty signatories of a petition submitted by Freud historian Peter Swales to the Library of Congress requesting that a Freud exhibition the Library had planned be rendered less one-sided; the protests evidently delayed the exhibit's opening by two years. Eli Zaretsky, who identifies Crews as one of Freud's most prominent critics, writes that Crews's challenges to Freud and psychoanalysis have gone largely unanswered.

==== Biography of Freud ====
Crews's Freud: The Making of an Illusion was published in August 2017. Crews's research into letters that Freud wrote to Martha Bernays revealed that Freud's use of cocaine "was more severe and far longer-lasting than previously known. It significantly affected his writing, marriage, moods, and treatment assessments." The letters also revealed that Freud's daughter Anna and his biographer Ernest Jones covered up treatments that were ineffective. Crews traces the steps by which Freud was constrained to pursue a medical career, reveals how he overrode therapeutic failures by advancing dubious theoretical claims, and ends by exploring the authoritarian means by which he guided a movement lacking an empirical foundation. The psychiatrist E. Fuller Torrey concluded: "The culmination of more than 40 years of research ... [, it] is doubtful whether it will be surpassed as a scholarly work on Freud as a person or on the origin of his ideas."

=== Criticism of recovered memory therapy ===
In 1993 and 1994, Crews wrote a series of critical essays and reviews of books relating to repressed and recovered memories, which also provoked heated debate and letters to the editors of The New York Review of Books. The essays, along with critical and supporting letters and his responses, were published as The Memory Wars (1995). Crews believes the "memories" of childhood seduction Freud reported were not real memories but constructs that Freud created and forced upon his patients. According to Crews, the seduction theory that Freud abandoned in the late 1890s acted as a precedent and contributing factor to the wave of false allegations of childhood sexual abuse in the 1980s and 1990s.

Crews was a member of the now-disbanded False Memory Syndrome Foundation's advisory board and was described as "leading a backlash against recovered memory therapy."

=== Other interests ===
==== Writing handbooks ====
In 1974, Crews published The Random House Handbook, a best-selling college composition textbook that offered extensive rhetorical advice for writing academic essays as well as reference information on correct and effective use of the English language. The book brought together two aspects of writing instruction not generally covered in a single text. It was widely praised for being highly readable and helpful and was written in a clear, often elegant style, with occasional flashes of humor, something rare in college writing handbooks then or now. It was also highly successful, running to six editions. Crews also co-authored three editions of The Borzoi Handbook for Writers for McGraw-Hill.

==== Advocacy for the innocence of Jerry Sandusky ====
Up to his death, Crews continued to advocate for Jerry Sandusky in the belief that Sandusky is innocent of the charges of sexual abuse of young boys of which he was convicted. Crews wrote articles such as "A Shower of Lies and the Mess at Penn State".

His last interview on this topic was with the Daily Mail reporter Emma James as part of a series of articles revisiting the Sandusky conviction in light of new evidence and a June 26, 2024 appeal hearing.

Crews was motivated to defend Sandusky after reading The Most Hated Man in America: Jerry Sandusky and the Rush to Judgment by Mark Pendergrast. The book served as the basis for Crews' article in Skeptic Magazine, "Trial by Therapy: The Jerry Sandusky Case Revisited". Crews expanded on his thoughts in the case in an interview with John Ziegler on the World According to Zig podcast in October 2019.

==== The New York Review of Books ====
As a reviewer for The New York Review of Books, Crews wrote on topics in addition to Freud, including:

- A 1988 review of books, "Whose American Renaissance?" criticizing a growing group of contemporary United States literary critics, whom Crews pejoratively termed "New Americanists," giving the hitherto unnamed movement coherence and a common enemy (Crews himself).
- A 1998 review of books related to the UFO abduction phenomenon, stating that he believed the use of hypnosis, suggestion and demand characteristics by unskilled hypnotherapists, and confabulation by the subjects were the primary causes of the phenomenon, and sources of the memories.
- A 2001 review of books related to the creation–evolution controversy, criticising the question-begging nature of creationism and pointing out its lack of scientific merit.
- A 2007 review of books relating to major depressive disorder, selective serotonin reuptake inhibitors, discussing in particular fluoxetine (Prozac) and paroxetine (Paxil) as part of a lengthy essay on the relationship between pharmaceutical companies, academic psychiatry and psychiatrists and the United States Food and Drug Administration.

==== Cybereditions ====
Crews served on the editorial board of Cybereditions, a print on demand publishing company founded by Denis Dutton in 2000.

== Honors and awards ==
- Fulbright Lectureship, Turin, Italy, 1961–62
- Essay Prize, National Council on the Arts and Humanities, 1968
- Fellow, Center for Advanced Study in the Behavioral Sciences, Stanford, 1965–66
- Guggenheim Fellowship (Literary criticism), 1970
- Distinguished Teaching Award, University of California, Berkeley, 1985
- Election to the American Academy of Arts and Sciences, 1991
- Faculty Research Lecturer, University of California, Berkeley, 1991–92
- Editorial Board, "Rethinking Theory" series, Northwestern University Press, 1992–2024
- Nomination for National Book Critics Circle Award for Nonfiction (The Critics Bear It Away), 1992
- PEN/Diamonstein-Spielvogel Award for the Art of the Essay (The Critics Bear It Away), 1993
- Berkeley Citation, 1994
- Inclusion in The Best American Science and Nature Writing 2002, ed. Natalie Angier (Houghton Mifflin), 2002
- Fellow, Commission for Scientific Medicine and Mental Health, 2003–2024
- Berkeley Fellow, 2005–2024
- Inclusion in The Best American Science and Nature Writing 2005, ed. Jonathan Weiner (Houghton Mifflin), 2005
- Nominated for National Book Critics Circle Award (Follies of the Wise), 2006

== Bibliography ==
=== As author ===
- Crews, FC (1957) [1971 Archon books re-issue]. The Tragedy of Manners: Moral Drama in the Later Novels of Henry James. Yale University Press. ISBN 0-208-01047-5.
- Crews, FC (1962) [2003 Textbook Publishers re-issue]. E. M. Forster: The Perils of Humanism. Princeton University Press. ISBN 0-7581-5768-1.
- Crews, FC (2003) [1963]. The Pooh Perplex: A Student Casebook (2003 re-issue). E.P. Dutton/University of Chicago Press. ISBN 0-226-12058-9.
- Crews, FC (1989) [1966]. The Sins of the Fathers: Hawthorne's Psychological Themes. Berkeley: University of California Press. ISBN 0-520-06817-3.
- Crews, FC (1968). The Patch Commission. E. P. Dutton.
- Crews, FC (1975). Out of My System: Psychoanalysis, Ideology, and Critical Method. Oxford University Press. ISBN 0-19-501947-4.
- Crews, FC (1991) [1980]. The Random House Handbook. McGraw-Hill. ISBN 0-07-013636-X.
- Crews, FC (1981). The Random House Reader. McGraw-Hill. ISBN 978-0075535973.
- Crews, FC (1986). Skeptical Engagements. Oxford University Press. ISBN 0-19-503950-5.
- Crews, FC (1992). The Critics Bear It Away: American Fiction and the Academy. Random House. ISBN 0-679-40413-9.
- Crews, FC; Schor S; Hennessy M (1993). The Borzoi Handbook for Writers (3rd ed.). McGraw-Hill. ISBN 0-07-911401-6.
- Crews, FC (1995). The Memory Wars: Freud's Legacy in Dispute. The New York Review of Books. ISBN 0-940322-04-8.
- Crews, FC (2001). Postmodern Pooh. North Point Press. ISBN 0-86547-626-8.
- Crews, FC (2006). Follies of the Wise: Dissenting Essays. Shoemaker & Hoard. ISBN 1-59376-101-5.
- Crews, FC (2017). Freud: The Making of an Illusion. Metropolitan Books. ISBN 9781627797177.

=== As editor ===
- Hawthorne, N. (1962). Crews, FC (ed.). Great Short Works of Nathaniel Hawthorne. New York: Harper & Row. ISBN 978-0060830748.
- Crews, FC (1970). Psychoanalysis and Literary Process. Winthrop Publishers. ISBN 0-13-732362-X.
- Crews, FC; Schell O (1970). Starting Over: A College Reader. Random House.
- Crews, FC; McMichael GL (1997). Anthology of American Literature. Englewood Cliffs, N.J: Prentice Hall. ISBN 0-13-573973-X.
- Crews, FC (1998). Unauthorized Freud: Doubters Confront a Legend. Viking Press. ISBN 0-670-87221-0.
- Crews, FC; McMichael GL (1998). Concise Anthology of American Literature. Englewood Cliffs, N.J: Prentice Hall. ISBN 0-13-373291-6.

=== As contributor ===
- Crane, S. (2007). E. C. Link; D. Pizer (eds.). The Red Badge of Courage (Fourth Edition) (Norton Critical Editions). New York: W. W. Norton & Company. ISBN 978-0393930757.
- "Truth, Science, and the Failures of Psychoanalysis: Frederick Crews Reveals Why He Became a Freud Skeptic", in Dufresne, Todd. Against Freud: Critics Talk Back. Stanford University Press, 2007, pp. 70–87. (Crews interviewed by Todd Dufresne.)
