= Gordon Fraser (publisher) =

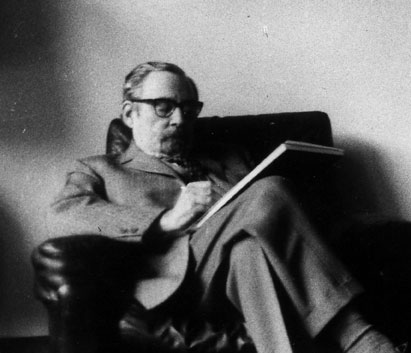
Photograph of Gordon Fraser taken by Robert Gaillot "Cette photographie a été faîte dans son appartement de Fitzroy yard. Un dimanche après-midi, en 1974 ou en 1975, je ne me souviens pas exactement."

Gordon Fraser (26 February 1911 – 27 June 1981) was a British publisher and literary editor. Through his eponymous gallery, he is considered to have "revolutionized greetings card design and quality".

== Biography ==
Fraser was born of a Scottish father and English mother and brought up in England. He was educated at Oundle School and St John's College, Cambridge. A student of F. R. Leavis, he founded, while still an undergraduate, The Minority Press, which published chiefly essays of Leavis and works of other Cambridge students from 1930 to 1933. The role of Fraser and The Minority Press in British literary criticism has been described by Ian Duncan MacKillop. In 1935, Fraser set up a bookshop in Portugal Place, Cambridge, combining it with a small gallery of fine art prints, and in 1938 he introduced his first Christmas greetings cards. He founded a greetings card company bearing his name, the Gordon Fraser Gallery, which was located on Fitzroy Road, Primrose Hill, London.

During the Second World War he served as an intelligence officer in north Africa and worked with the partisan underground in Yugoslavia. He was Head of Radio for UNESCO from 1948 to 1954. He resigned to return to the Gordon Fraser Gallery, and later founded two other publishing houses, The Fraser Press and Gordon Fraser, that specialized in off-beat topics. Fraser was killed in an automobile accident in June 1981. Fraser was a polyglot and knew both Marx and the Presbyterian Bible "par coeur".

== Personal life ==
He married Nancy Katharine Jones in 1936 and had two children, Margaret and Ian.

== Legacy ==
The Gordon Fraser Charitable Trust, created in 1966, makes donations to charities, considering applications quarterly.
