= Oscar Rasbach =

American pianist and composer

Oscar Rasbach (August 2, 1888 – March 23, 1975) was an American pianist, composer and arranger of art songs and works for piano.

== Biography ==
Oscar was born in Kentucky, but studied "academic subjects in Los Angeles". He also studied music with Ludwig Thomas, Julius Albert Jahn, José Anderson, and A. J. Stamm. He became a businessman, but went to Vienna to study piano with Theodor Leschetizky and music theory with Hans Thorton. He returned to the United States in 1911 and settled in San Marino, California. There he worked as a pianist, accompanist, teacher, and choral director. His obituary in the local news and the Musical Times claimed that he was a founding member of ASCAP, but the 1966 ASCAP Dictionary says that he joined in 1932.

== Music ==
Rasbach composed two operettas, around 20 published songs, solos for student pianists, and a few arrangements and instrumental pieces. His most important musical composition was his 1922 setting of Trees, the popular poem by Joyce Kilmer, published by G. Schirmer. It was performed and recorded by many important singers of the 20th century, such as Ernestine Schumann-Heink, John Charles Thomas, Nelson Eddy, Robert Merrill, Paul Robeson, Richard Tauber and Mario Lanza. More recently, tenor John Aler recorded it on a program entitled Songs we Forgot to Remember, and Julian Lloyd Webber included an instrumental version for cello and piano on his Unexpected Songs cd.

== Musical compositions ==
=== Songs for voice and piano ===
- April (text by Elsie M. Fowler), 1932
- Beloved (text by Josephine Johnson), 1941
- Crossing the Bar (text by Alfred, Lord Tennyson), 1939
- Debt (text by Sara Teasdale), 1926
- Discovery (text by Gilean Douglas), 1945
- The Eagle, (text by Alfred, Lord Tennyson), unpublished manuscript
- Gifts (text by Juliana Horatia Ewing), 1930
- The Greater Thing (text by C.T. Davis), 1941
- The Laughing Brook (text by Elizabeth Ellis Scantlebury), 1926, B.F. Wood Music Co. publisher
- The Look (text by Sara Teasdale), 1925
- Love Shall Light the Haven (Prothalamium) (text by Leigh Hanes), 1936
- Motherhood
- Mountains (text by Leigh Hanes), 1930
- Overtones (text by William Alexander Percy), 1929
- Prelude in March (text by Gilean Douglas), 1941
- Promise, 1932
- The Redwoods (text by J. B. Strauss), 1937, Sherman, Clay & Co. publisher
- Trees (text by Joyce Kilmer), 1922
- A Wanderer's Song (text by John Masefield)
- When I am dead, my dearest (text by Christina Rossetti), 1941

=== Piano solo ===
- Barefoot Boy, 1939
- Day Dreams, 1938, Willis Music publisher (John Thompson's students series for the piano)
- El Burrito, 1941
- Étude Mélodique, 1946
- Evening at Padua Hills, 1939
- Folk-Song Sonatinas (In Colonial Days, etc.), 1943
- From 'way Down South (Turkey in the Straw), 1934
- The Old Mill Wheel, 1934
- Pleading, 1934
- Scherzo, 1921
- Spanish Nights, 1934
- Tango, 1936
- Valse Charlene, 1936
- Valse Elaine, 1938
- The Village Blacksmith, 1939
- Waltz Improvisation
- Wishing
- Woods at Night, 1938

=== Musical arrangements ===
- España (Emmanuel Chabrier), for piano solo
- Sigh No More, Ladies (James H. Rogers/Shakespeare), for women's chorus, 1959
- The Skaters (Emil Waldteufel), for piano solo, 1941
- Thou, too, sail on, O Ship of State! (text by Henry Wadsworth Longfellow) (Engelbert Humperdinck, "Abends, will ich schlafen gehn" from Hansel and Gretel), for women's chorus, 1943
- You and You (Johann Strauss II, Die Fledermaus), for piano solo

=== Other works ===
- Dawn Boy, Indian Operetta in 2 Acts and 3 Scenes (book and lyrics by C. Allen), 1933
- Gifts, violin and piano
- Open House, operetta
- Songs Without Words, string ensemble with piano (arr. by Louis Hintze), 1937

== Filmography ==
His song Trees was used in 10 film and television productions:

- The In-Laws, 1979 (uncredited)
- All in the Family (TV series), "The Bunkers Go West", 1978 (uncredited)
- Perry Como's Kraft Music Hall (TV series), Episode dated 21 March 1959 (uncredited)
- Melody Time, 1948
- Blondie in Society, 1941
- Woman Chases Man, 1937 (uncredited)
- Toyland Broadcast (short), 1934 (uncredited)
- The Tree's Knees (short), 1931
- Dorothy Whitmore (short), 1928
- Mme. Ernestine Schumann-Heink (short), 1927
