= F. R. Leavis =

English literary critic (1895–1978)

F. R. Leavis CH
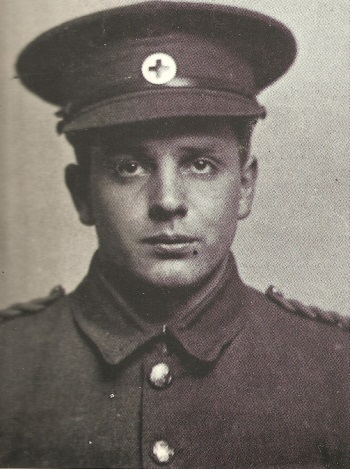
- Leavis pictured in his Friends' Ambulance Unit uniform, 1915
- Born: Frank Raymond Leavis; 14 July 1895; Cambridge, England
- Died: 14 April 1978 (aged 82); Cambridge, England
- Known for: New Bearings in English Poetry (1932); The Great Tradition (1948); The Common Pursuit (1952); Two Cultures? The Significance of C. P. Snow (lecture; 1962)
- Spouse: Queenie Leavis (m. 1929)
- Children: 3

Academic background
- Education: Emmanuel College, Cambridge
- Thesis: The Relationship of Journalism to Literature (1924)
- Influences: Matthew Arnold; Henry James; D. H. Lawrence; T. S. Eliot; I. A. Richards

Academic work
- Institutions: Downing College, Cambridge; University of York
- Influenced: David Holbrook; Arnold Kettle; Wilfrid Mellers; Raymond Williams; Norman Podhoretz; Howard Jacobson

Frank Raymond "F. R." Leavis CH (/ˈliːvɪs/ LEE-vis; 14 July 1895 – 14 April 1978) was an English literary critic of the early-to-mid-twentieth century. He taught for much of his career at Downing College, Cambridge, and later at the University of York.

Leavis ranked among the most prominent English-language critics in the 1950s and 1960s. J. B. Bamborough wrote of him in 1963: "it would be true to say that in the last thirty or more years hardly anyone seriously concerned with the study of English literature has not been influenced by him in some way."

== Early life and education ==
Leavis was born in Cambridge in 1895 to Harry Leavis (1862–1921) and Kate Sarah Moore (1874–1929). His father was a cultured man who ran a shop in Cambridge that sold pianos and other musical instruments, and his son was to retain a respect for him throughout his life. Leavis was educated at the Perse School in Cambridge (in English terms a public school). The headmaster W. H. D. Rouse was a classicist known for his "direct method" which required teachers to carry on classroom conversations with their pupils in Latin and classical Greek. Though he had some fluency in foreign languages, Leavis felt that his native language was the only one on which he was able to speak with authority. His extensive reading in the classical languages is not therefore strongly evident in his work.

Leavis had won a scholarship from the Perse School to Emmanuel College, Cambridge, to study history. Britain declared war on Germany soon after he matriculated, when he was 19. Leavis left Cambridge after his first year as an undergraduate and joined the Friends' Ambulance Unit (FAU) at York in 1915. After the introduction of conscription in 1916, when his brother Ralph also joined the FAU, he benefited from blanket recognition of the members of the Friends' Ambulance Unit as conscientious objectors. Leavis is quoted as saying: "But after the Bloody Somme there could be no question for anyone who knew what modern war was like of joining the army."

He worked in France behind the Western Front, carrying a copy of Milton's poems with him. His wartime experiences had a lasting effect on him, making him prone to insomnia. He maintained that exposure to poison gas retained in the clothes of soldiers who had been gassed damaged his physical health, but that his poor digestion was due to "...not gas at Ypres, but the things I didn't say". Leavis was slow to recover from the war, and he was later to refer to it as "the great hiatus". He said: "The war, to put it egotistically, was bad luck for us."

On his return from the war in 1919, Leavis resumed his studies at Cambridge and obtained a lower second-class in Part I of the history tripos. He then changed his field of study to English and became a student in the English Faculty. Despite graduating with first-class honours in his final examinations, Leavis was not seen as a strong candidate for a research fellowship and instead embarked on a PhD, then an unusual career move for an aspiring academic. In 1924, Leavis presented a thesis on The Relationship of Journalism to Literature, which "studied the rise and earlier development of the press in England". This work contributed to his lifelong concern with the way in which the ethos of a periodical can both reflect and mould the cultural aspirations of a wider public.

== Career ==
In 1927 Leavis was appointed as a probationary lecturer for the university, and, when his first substantial publications began to appear a few years later, their style was much influenced by the demands of teaching. In 1929 Leavis married one of his students, Queenie Roth, and this union resulted in a collaboration that yielded many critical works. 1932 was an annus mirabilis for them, when Leavis published New Bearings in English Poetry, his wife published Fiction and the Reading Public, and the quarterly periodical Scrutiny was founded. A small publishing house, The Minority Press, was founded by Gordon Fraser, another of Leavis's students, in 1930, and served for several years as an additional outlet for the work of Leavis and some of his students.

In 1931 Leavis was appointed director of studies in English at Downing College, where he taught for the next 30 years. He soon founded Scrutiny, the critical quarterly that he edited until 1953, using it as a vehicle for the new Cambridge criticism, upholding rigorous intellectual standards and attacking the dilettante elitism he believed to characterise the Bloomsbury Group. Scrutiny provided a forum for (on occasion) identifying important contemporary work and (more commonly) reviewing the traditional canon by serious criteria. This criticism was informed by a teacher's concern to present the essential to students, taking into consideration time constraints and a limited range of experience.

Leavis was a friend of Austrian philosopher Ludwig Wittgenstein, whom he met at the house of their mutual friend, the logician W. E. Johnson. He later wrote a piece Memories of Wittgenstein recalling their friendship.

New Bearings in English Poetry was the first major volume of criticism Leavis was to publish, and it provides insight into his own critical positions. He has been frequently (but often erroneously) associated with the American school of New Critics, a group which advocated close reading and detailed textual analysis of poetry over, or even instead of, an interest in the mind and personality of the poet, sources, the history of ideas and political and social implications. Although there are undoubtedly similarities between Leavis's approach to criticism and that of the New Critics (most particularly in that both take the work of art itself as the primary focus of critical discussion), Leavis is ultimately distinguishable from them, since he never adopted (and was explicitly hostile to) a theory of the poem as a self-contained and self-sufficient aesthetic and formal artefact, isolated from the society, culture and tradition from which it emerged. New Bearings, devoted principally to Gerard Manley Hopkins, William Butler Yeats, T. S. Eliot, and Ezra Pound, was an attempt to identify the essential new achievements in modern poetry. It also discussed at length and praised the work of Ronald Bottrall, whose importance was not to be confirmed by readers and critics.

In 1933 Leavis published For Continuity, which was a selection of Scrutiny essays. This publication, along with Culture and the Environment (a joint effort with Denys Thompson), stressed the importance of an informed and discriminating, highly trained intellectual elite whose existence within university English departments would help preserve the cultural continuity of English life and literature. In Education and the University (1943), Leavis argued that "there is a prior cultural achievement of language; language is not a detachable instrument of thought and communication. It is the historical embodiment of its community's assumptions and aspirations at levels which are so subliminal much of the time that language is their only index".

Leavis is sometimes seen as having contributed to the mythos of Merrie England with his notion of the "organic community", by which he seems to have meant a community with a deeply rooted and locally self-sufficient culture that he claimed to have existed in the villages of 17th and 18th century England and which was destroyed by the machine and mass culture introduced by the Industrial Revolution. Historians of the era have suggested that the idea was based on a misreading of history and that such communities had never existed. No historians of Early Modern Britain have given credence to the notion of the organic community.

In 1948, Leavis focused his attention on fiction and made his general statement about the English novel in The Great Tradition, where he traced this claimed tradition through Jane Austen, George Eliot, Henry James, and Joseph Conrad. Contentiously, Leavis, and his followers, excluded major authors such as Charles Dickens, Laurence Sterne and Thomas Hardy from his canon, characterising Dickens as a "mere entertainer"; but eventually, following the revaluation of Dickens by Edmund Wilson and George Orwell, Leavis changed his position, publishing Dickens the Novelist in 1970. The Leavisites' downgrading of Hardy may have damaged Leavis's own authority. In 1950, in the introduction to Mill on Bentham and Coleridge, a publication he edited, Leavis set out the historical importance of utilitarian thought. Leavis found Bentham to epitomise the scientific drift of culture and social thinking, which was in his view the enemy of the holistic, humane understanding he championed.

The Common Pursuit, another collection of his essays from Scrutiny, was published in 1952. Outside his work on English poetry and the novel, this is Leavis's best-known and most influential work. A decade later Leavis was to earn much notoriety when he delivered his Richmond lecture, Two Cultures? The Significance of C. P. Snow at Downing College. Leavis vigorously attacked Snow's suggestion, from a 1959 lecture and book by C. P. Snow (see The Two Cultures), that practitioners of the scientific and humanistic disciplines should have some significant understanding of each other, and that a lack of knowledge of 20th century physics was comparable to an ignorance of Shakespeare. Leavis's ad hominem attacks on Snow's intelligence and abilities were widely decried in the British press by public figures such as Lord Boothby and Lionel Trilling.

Leavis introduced the idea of the "third realm" as a name for the method of existence of literature; works which are not private like a dream or public in the sense of something that can be tripped over, but exist in human minds as a work of collaborative re-constitution. The notion of the "third realm" has not received much attention subsequently.

== Character and reputation ==
As Leavis continued his career he became increasingly dogmatic, belligerent and paranoid, and Martin Seymour-Smith found him (and his disciples) to be "fanatic and rancid in manner". Leavis's conduct led to a breach with T. S. Eliot, who wrote

I so strongly disagreed with Dr Leavis during the last days of Scrutiny, and objected to his attacks and innuendoes about people I knew and respected. I think it is a pity he became so intemperate in his views and was extravagant in his admirations, as I had, in the earlier stages of the magazine, felt great sympathy for its editor.

Leavis's uncompromising zeal in promoting his views of literature drew mockery from quarters of the literary world involved in imaginative writing. In a letter that Edith Sitwell wrote to Pamela Hansford Johnson in 1959 she described Leavis as "a tiresome, whining, pettyfogging little pipsqueak". Leavis (as "Simon Lacerous") and Scrutiny (as "Thumbscrew") were satirised by Frederick Crews in the chapter "Another Book to Cross off your List" of his lampoon of literary criticism theory The Pooh Perplex. In her novel Possession, A. S. Byatt (who was taught by Leavis) wrote of one of her characters "Leavis did to Blackadder what he did to serious students: he showed him the terrible, the magnificent importance and urgency of English literature and simultaneously deprived him of any confidence in his own capacity to contribute to or change it." Tom Sharpe, in his novel The Great Pursuit, depicts a ludicrous series of events ending in the hero teaching Leavisite criticism as a religion in the American Bible Belt. In the mock epic heroic poem by Clive James, Peregrine Pykke (1976), the eponymous hero studies literature under the prophet F R Looseleaf at Downing College. According to Clive James, "You became accustomed to seeing him walk briskly along Trinity Street, gown blown out horizontal in his slipstream. He looked as if walking briskly was something he had practised in a wind-tunnel."

In his autobiography The Fry Chronicles, Stephen Fry described Leavis as a "sanctimonious prick of only parochial significance" and said that Leavis had an "intense suspicious propensity to explode in wrath and anathematize anyone who dared disagree with him". Fry notes:

by the time I arrived in Cambridge his influence had waned, and he and his kind had been almost entirely eclipsed ... Stories of Frank Leavis and his harridan of a wife Queenie snubbing, ostracising, casting out and calumniating anyone who offended them went the round, and those English academics at the university who had been in their orbit were callously dismissed by the elite as dead Leavisites.

The literary critic John Gross accuses Leavis of "narrowness, spitefulness, dogmatism", "distortion, omission and strident overstatement" and says that "the overall effect of his teaching has plainly been calculated ... to produce many of the characteristics of a religious or ideological sect."

In 2006, Brooke Allen wrote "In the end, Leavis fell short of his own high humanistic ideals, through intellectual exclusivity and sheer bloody-mindedness, and the passionate advocate degenerated into the hectoring bigot."

== Criticism ==
=== Overview ===
Leavis's proponents said that he introduced a "seriousness" into English studies, and some English and American university departments were shaped by his example and ideas. He appeared to possess a clear idea of literary criticism, and he was well known for his decisive and often provocative, and idiosyncratic, judgements. He insisted that valuation was the principal concern of criticism, that it must ensure that English literature should be a living reality operating as an informing spirit in society, and that criticism should involve the shaping of contemporary sensibility.

Leavis's criticism can be grouped into four chronological stages. The first is that of his early publications and essays, including New Bearings in English Poetry (1932) and Revaluation (1936). Here he was concerned primarily with re-examining poetry from the 17th to 20th centuries, and this was accomplished under the strong influence of T. S. Eliot. Also during this early period Leavis sketched out his views about university education.

He then turned his attention to fiction and the novel, producing The Great Tradition (1948) and D. H. Lawrence, Novelist (1955). Following this period Leavis pursued an increasingly complex treatment of literary, educational and social issues. Though the hub of his work remained literature, his perspective for commentary was noticeably broadening, and this was most visible in Nor Shall my Sword (1972).

Two of his last publications embodied the critical sentiments of his final years; The Living Principle: 'English' as a Discipline of Thought (1975), and Thought, Words and Creativity: Art and Thought in Lawrence (1976). Although these later works have been sometimes called "philosophy", it has been argued that there is no abstract or theoretical context to justify such a description. In discussing the nature of language and value, Leavis implicitly treats the sceptical questioning that philosophical reflection starts from as an irrelevance from his standpoint as a literary critic – a position set out in his early exchange with René Wellek (reprinted in The Common Pursuit).

=== On poetry ===
Leavis is sometimes viewed as having been a better critic of poetry than of the novel. In New Bearings in English Poetry Leavis attacked the Victorian poetical ideal, suggesting that 19th-century poetry sought the consciously "poetical" and showed a separation of thought and feeling and a divorce from the real world. The influence of T. S. Eliot is easily identifiable in his criticism of Victorian poetry, and Leavis acknowledged this, saying in The Common Pursuit that, "It was Mr. Eliot who made us fully conscious of the weakness of that tradition" . In his later publication Revaluation, the dependence on Eliot was still very much present, but Leavis demonstrated an individual critical sense operating in such a way as to place him among the distinguished modern critics.

The early reception of T. S. Eliot and the reading of Hopkins were considerably enhanced by Leavis's proclamation of their greatness. His criticism of Milton, on the other hand, had no great impact on Milton's popular esteem. Many of his finest analyses of poems were reprinted in the late work, The Living Principle.

=== On the novel ===
As a critic of the English novel, Leavis's main tenet stated that great novelists show an intense moral interest in life, and that this moral interest determines the nature of their form in fiction. Authors within this "tradition" were all characterised by a serious or responsible attitude to the moral complexity of life and included Jane Austen, George Eliot, Henry James, Joseph Conrad, and D. H. Lawrence, but excluded Thomas Hardy and Charles Dickens. In The Great Tradition Leavis attempted to set out his conception of the proper relation between form/composition and moral interest/art and life. Leavis, along with his wife, Q.D. Leavis, was later to revise his opinion of Dickens in their study, Dickens the Novelist (1970). He also praised the moral seriousness of American novelists such as Nathaniel Hawthorne, Herman Melville, and Mark Twain.

=== On the BBC ===
Leavis was one of the earliest detractors of the BBC. He accused the corporation's coverage of English literature of lacking impartiality, and of vulgarising the literary taste of British society. In 1931, Leavis took issue with a BBC series of book discussions presented by Harold Nicolson, claiming that Nicolson's programmes lacked the "sensitiveness of intelligence" which Leavis believed good literary criticism required. Throughout his career, Leavis constantly took issue with the BBC's motives and actions, even once jokingly referring to his "anti-BBC complex".

== Later life and death ==
In 1964 Leavis resigned his fellowship at Downing and took up visiting professorships at the University of Bristol, the University of Wales and the University of York. His final volumes of criticism were Nor Shall My Sword (1972), The Living Principle (1975) and Thought, Words and Creativity (1976).

He was appointed a Member of the Order of the Companions of Honour (CH) in the 1978 New Year Honours.

Leavis died in 1978, at the age of 82, His wife Queenie died in 1981. He features as a main character, played by Ian Holm, in the 1992 BBC Screen Two film The Last Romantics; the story focuses on his relationship with his mentor, Sir Arthur Quiller-Couch, and the students.

== Works by Leavis ==
- Mass Civilization and Minority Culture, Minority Pamphlet No. 1, Gordon Fraser, The Minority Press: Cambridge, 1930.
- New Bearings in English Poetry: A Study of the Contemporary Situation, Chatto & Windus: London, 1932.
- How to Teach Reading: A Primer for Ezra Pound, Gordon Fraser, The Minority Press: Cambridge, 1932.
- D. H. Lawrence, Gordon Fraser, The Minority Press: Cambridge, 1932. For Continuity, Gordon Fraser, The Minority Press: Cambridge, 1933.
- Towards Standards of Criticism, selections from The Calendar of Modern Letters, with an Introduction by F. R. Leavis, Lawrence & Wishart: London, 1933.
- Culture and Environment: The Training of Critical Awareness (with Denys Thompson), Chatto & Windus: London; Oxford University Press: Toronto, 1933.
- Determinations: Critical Essays, edited with an Introduction by F. R. Leavis, Chatto & Windus: London, 1934.
- Revaluation: Tradition and Development in English Poetry, Chatto & Windus: London; Macmillan: Toronto, 1936.
- Education and the University: A Sketch for an English School, Chatto & Windus: London; Macmillan: Toronto, 1943.
- The Great Tradition: George Eliot, Henry James, Joseph Conrad, Chatto & Windus: London; Clarke Irwin: Toronto, 1948.
- Mill on Bentham and Coleridge, with an Introduction by F. R. Leavis (pp. 1–38), Chatto & Windus: London, 1950.
- The Common Pursuit, Chatto & Windus: London; Clarke, Irwin: Toronto, 1952.
- D. H. Lawrence: Novelist, Chatto & Windus: London; Clarke, Irwin: Toronto, 1955.
- Two Cultures? The Significance of C. P. Snow, Being the Richmond Lecture, 1962, with an Essay on Sir Charles Snow's Rede Lecture by Michael Yudkin, Chatto & Windus: London; Clarke, Irwin: Toronto, 1962.
- Scrutiny: A Reprint, 20 volumes, Cambridge University Press: Cambridge, 1963.
- Anna Karenina and Other Essays, Chatto & Windus: London, 1967.
- A Selection from Scrutiny, 2 volumes, Cambridge University Press: Cambridge, 1968.
- English Literature in Our Time and the University, Chatto & Windus: London, 1969.
- Lectures in America (with Q. D. Leavis), Chatto & Windus: London, 1969.
- Dickens the Novelist (with Q. D. Leavis), Chatto & Windus: London, 1970.
- Nor Shall My Sword: Discourses on Pluralism, Compassion and Social Hope, Chatto & Windus: London, 1972.
- Letters in Criticism, edited with an Introduction by John Tasker, Chatto & Windus: London, 1974.
- The Living Principle: 'English' as a Discipline of Thought, Chatto & Windus: London, 1975.
- Towards Standards of Criticism: Selections from The Calendar of Modern Letters, chosen and with a new Introduction by F. R. Leavis, Lawrence & Wishart: London,1976.
- Thought, Words and Creativity: Art and Thought in Lawrence, Chatto & Windus:London, 1976.
- The Critic as Anti-Philosopher, edited by G. Singh, Chatto & Windus: London, 1982.
- Valuation in Criticism and Other Essays, edited by G. Singh, Cambridge University Press: Cambridge, 1986.

== Works cited ==
- Bell, Michael (1988). F. R. Leavis. Routledge.
- Bilan, R. P. (1979). The Literary Criticism of F. R. Leavis. Cambridge University Press. ISBN 978-0-521-22324-9.
- Day, Gary. Re-Reading Leavis: Culture and Literary Criticism, Palgrave Macmillan (1996)
- Greenwood, Edward (1978). F. R. Leavis. London: Longman Group.
- Hayman, Ronald (1976). Leavis.
- Howarth, T. E. B., Cambridge Between Two Wars, Collins (1978).
- Leavis, F. R. (1952). The Common Pursuit. London / Toronto: Chatto & Windus / Clarke, Irwin.
- MacKillop, I D (1997). F. R. Leavis: a life in criticism. New York: St Martin's Press. ISBN 0312163576.
- Mulhern, Francis. The Moment of Scrutiny, New Left Books (1979).
- Ortolano, Guy. "F. R. Leavis, Science, and the Abiding Crisis of Modern Civilization", History of Science, 43: 161–85 (2005).
- Podhoretz, Norman. "F. R. Leavis: A Revaluation", The New Criterion, Vol. 1, September 1982.
- Robinson, Ian. "The English Prophets", The Brynmill Press Ltd (2001).
- Samson, Anne. F. R. Leavis (Modern Cultural Theorists), University of Toronto (1992).
- Singh, G. (1998). "The Achievement of F.R. Leavis," Modern Age, Vol. 40, No. 4, pp. 397–405.
- Storer, Richard. F. R Leavis, Routledge (2010).
- Walsh, William. F. R. Leavis, Chatto & Windus (1980).
