= Mark Royden Winchell =

American intellectual historian (1948–2008)

Mark Royden Winchell

Mark Royden Winchell (July 24, 1948 – May 8, 2008) was a biographer, essayist, historian and literary critic. At the time of his death he was Professor of Literature and European Civilization at Clemson University in South Carolina, where he had taught since 1985.

Winchell was born in Hamilton, Butler County, Ohio and graduated BA from West Virginia University before studying for his Ph.D. at Vanderbilt University. The journalist and author Joe Scotchie described him as "A traditionalist in literature and an Old Right conservative in politics."

Winchell died of cancer, aged 59, in 2008, at An-Med Medical Center, Anderson, South Carolina.

He and his wife, Donna Haisty Winchell, had two sons.

== Bibliography ==
- Joan Didion, Twayne Publishers, Boston (1980; rev. ed. 1989)
- Horace McCoy, Boise State University, Boise (1982)
- William F. Buckley, Jr., Twayne Publishers, Boston (1984)
- Leslie Fiedler, Twayne Publishers, Boston (1985)
- John Gregory Dunne, Boise State University, Boise (1986)
- Talmadge, a Political Legacy, a Politician's Life: A Memoir (by Herman E. Talmadge with Mark Royden Winchell), Peachtree Publishers, Atlanta (1987)
- Neoconservative Criticism: Norman Podhoretz, Kenneth S. Lynn, and Joseph Epstein, Twayne Publishers, Boston (1991)
- The Vanderbilt Tradition: Essays in Honor of Thomas Daniel Young (edited), Louisiana State University Press, Baton Rouge (1991)
- William Humphrey, Boise State University, Boise (1992)
- Cleanth Brooks and the Rise of Modern Criticism, University Press of Virginia, Charlottesville (1996)
- Where No Flag Flies: Donald Davidson and the Southern Resistance, University of Missouri Press, Columbia (2000)
- Too Good to Be True: The Life and Work of Leslie Fiedler, University of Missouri Press, Columbia (2002)
- Reinventing the South: Versions of a Literary Region, University of Missouri Press, Columbia (2006)
- Ideas in Conflict: Writing about the Great Issues of Civilization (by Donna Haisty Winchell and Mark Royden Winchell), Thomson/Wadsworth, Boston (2007)
- God, Man, and Hollywood: Politically Incorrect Cinema from "The Birth of a Nation" to "The Passion of the Christ", ISI, Wilmington (2008)
- The Cause of Us All: Cultural Politics and the American South, ISI, Wilmington (2011)
- Confessions of a Copperhead: Culture and Politics in the Modern South, Shotwell Publishing, Columbia, SC (2022)
