= R. P. Blackmur =

American literary critic and poet (1904–1965)

- Born: Richard Palmer Blackmur; January 21, 1904; Springfield, Massachusetts
- Died: February 2, 1965 (aged 61); Princeton, New Jersey
- Occupations: Literary critic and poet
- Awards: Rockefeller Fellowship (1947)

Academic background
- Education: Autodidact; no high school diploma

Academic work
- Discipline: Literature
- Sub-discipline: Modernism; New Criticism
- Institutions: Princeton University (1940–1965)

Richard Palmer Blackmur (January 21, 1904 – February 2, 1965) was an American literary critic and poet. He was a founding figure of the New Criticism movement in American literary criticism and later a professor of writing at Princeton University.

== Early life and education ==
Blackmur was born January 21, 1904 in Springfield, Massachusetts. His father had been a stockbroker in New York City, but he no longer worked so the family was now near poverty; his mother supported them by running a boarding house in Cambridge, Massachusetts for Harvard University students on Irving Street near the William James house.

He attended Cambridge High and Latin School, but was expelled in 1918 after a quarrel with the headmaster. An autodidact, Blackmur worked in Widener Library and in bookshops after high school and attended lectures at Harvard University without enrolling. He had an early love, Tessa Gilbert, who refused to marry him and was later referred to as Blackmur's "Maud Gonne" or his "Molly Bloom who would not say Yes." In this time he met Jack Wheelwright, who would introduce him to Matthew Josephson, Lincoln Kirstein, and Allen Tate, who would be key figures in his later career.

== Early literary career ==
Blackmur was hired by Harvard student writer Lincoln Kirstein to be managing editor of the student literary quarterly Hound & Horn in 1928 and held the job until 1930, when he was fired. Among his notable early works for Hound & Horn was a two part criticism of T. S. Eliot in 1928. In 1930 he married painter Helen Dickson and moved to Washington County, Maine. There, he continued to write criticism, poetry, novels, and plays while his wife supported them financially. He continued to contribute to Hound & Horn until its demise in 1934 and contributed to many other little magazines.

In 1935 he published his first volume of criticism, The Double Agent. In 1937 he published his first volume of poetry, From Jordan's Delight, titled after an island off the coast of Maine. He began, but never finished, a biography of Henry Adams and a critical book on Henry James. In 1938, he met and befriended Allen Tate when Tate lectured at Harvard University. During the 1930s his criticism was influential among many modernist poets and the New Critics, and he was considered a founding figure of New Criticism, though he had renounced the movement by 1941. During the 1930s he called himself variously a "conservative Christian anarchist" and a "Laski Communist," and he was not seriously engaged in politics. He collected more of his critical essays of this period in The Expense of Greatness (1940).

== Academic career ==
In 1940 Blackmur moved to Princeton University at the invitation of Allen Tate. There, he taught first creative writing as Associate of Creative Arts and then English literature for the next twenty-five years, famously in spite of having only, officially, a high school education. He initially struggled to keep his place, but finally became a full professor in 1951. Along the way he began to betray Tate, for instance spreading malicious gossip that Tate was a Nazi sympathizer, leading Tate to leave and later resent Blackmur's Machiavellianism. Blackmur and his wife divorced in 1951 after years of marital strife, mutual dissatisfaction, and infidelity on her part.

He continued to publish poetry, particularly the collections The Second World (1942) and The Good European (1947). He met other influential poets while he taught at Princeton including W. S. Merwin and John Berryman. Merwin later published an anthology dedicated to Blackmur and Berryman and a book of his own poetry (The Moving Target) dedicated to Blackmur. In 1952, Blackmur's collection of poetry criticism Language as a Gesture collected several of his previous critical essays from The Double Agent and The Expense of Greatness as well as several new essays on the poetry of W. B. Yeats, T. S. Eliot, Ezra Pound, and Wallace Stevens.

While at Princeton, Blackmur became an important literary expert for the Rockefeller Foundation via a friendship from his Cambridge days with Rockefeller associate director John Marshall (1903–1980). In 1947, he was awarded a Rockefeller Fellowship. He was a member of the Century Association. He founded Princeton's Gauss Seminars in Criticism in 1949, funded by the Rockefeller Foundation and named in honor of his colleague, Princeton dean Christian Gauss, and he officially directed these seminars 1957–1965.

He was invited to give a series of four lectures on the literature of 1921–1925 at the Library of Congress in 1956. Blackmur taught at Cambridge University in 1961–62. In this later phase of life, for instance in The Lion and the Honeycomb (1955), he became politically engaged, particularly with issues of university standards and reform and with rival critics such as Lionel Trilling; he was opposed to the Partisan Review group.

== Death ==
Blackmur died in February 2, 1965 in Princeton, New Jersey.

His papers are held at Princeton University and at Columbia University.

== In popular culture ==
Frederick Crews parodied Blackmur as "P. R. Honeycomb" in his 1963 book of satirical literary criticism The Pooh Perplex.

Saul Bellow based the snob figure of the critic Sewell on him in the novel Humboldt's Gift (1975).

== Works ==
Poetry

- From Jordan's Delight 1937
- The Second World, 1942
- The Good European, 1947
- Poems of R. P. Blackmur, Princeton University Press, 1977

Criticism

- The Double Agent: essays in craft and elucidation, 1935
- The Expense of Greatness, 1940
- Language as Gesture, 1952
- Form and value in modern poetry, Doubleday, 1952
- The Lion and the Honeycomb, 1955
- Eleven Essays in the European Novel. Harcourt, Brace & World. 1964.
- Studies in Henry James. New Directions Publishing. 1983. ISBN 9780811208642. "R. P. Blackmur."
- Denis Donoghue, ed. Selected essays of R.P. Blackmur, Ecco Press, 1986, ISBN 9780880010832

== Sources ==
- Baker, Carlos (April 1942). "R. P. Blackmur: A Checklist". The Princeton University Library Chronicle. 3 (3): 99–106. doi:10.2307/26400658. JSTOR 26400658.
- Boyers, Robert (1980). R. P. Blackmur, poet-critic: toward a view of poetic objects. University of Missouri Press. ISBN 978-0-82620315-1.
- Edel, Leon (Winter 1982). "Criticism's Double Agent". Grand Street. 1 (2): 143–150. doi:10.2307/25006400. JSTOR 25006400.
- Fowle, Rosemary (1954). "Review: A Critic's Job of Work". Chicago Review. 8 (1): 110–114. doi:10.2307/25293018. JSTOR 25293018.
- Fraser, Russell (1979). "R. P. Blackmur: The Politics of a New Critic". The Sewanee Review. 87 (4): 557–572. JSTOR 27543617.
- Fraser, Russell (1981a). "R. P. Blackmur: America's Best Critic". The Virginia Quarterly Review. 57 (4): 569–593. JSTOR 26436982.
- Fraser, Russell A. (1981b). A Mingled Yarn: The Life of R.P. Blackmur. Harcourt Brace Jovanovich. ISBN 9781412843249.
- Fraser, Russell (1983). "My Two Masters". The Sewanee Review. 91 (4): 614–633. JSTOR 27544212.
- Leitch, Alexander (1978). "Blackmur, Richard P.". A Princeton Companion. Princeton University Press.
- Marten, Harry (June 8, 1986). "A Master of Close Reading". The New York Times.
- Pritchard, William (December 13, 1981). "Good Poet, Best Critic". The New York Times.
- Spears, Monroe K. (1982). "Review: A Little Man Who Was a Writer". The Hudson Review. 35 (3): 453–459. doi:10.2307/3851410. JSTOR 3851410.
- Wood, Michael (May 7, 1987). "No Success Like Failure". New York Review of Books.
