= Leslie Fiedler =

American literary critic (1917–2003)

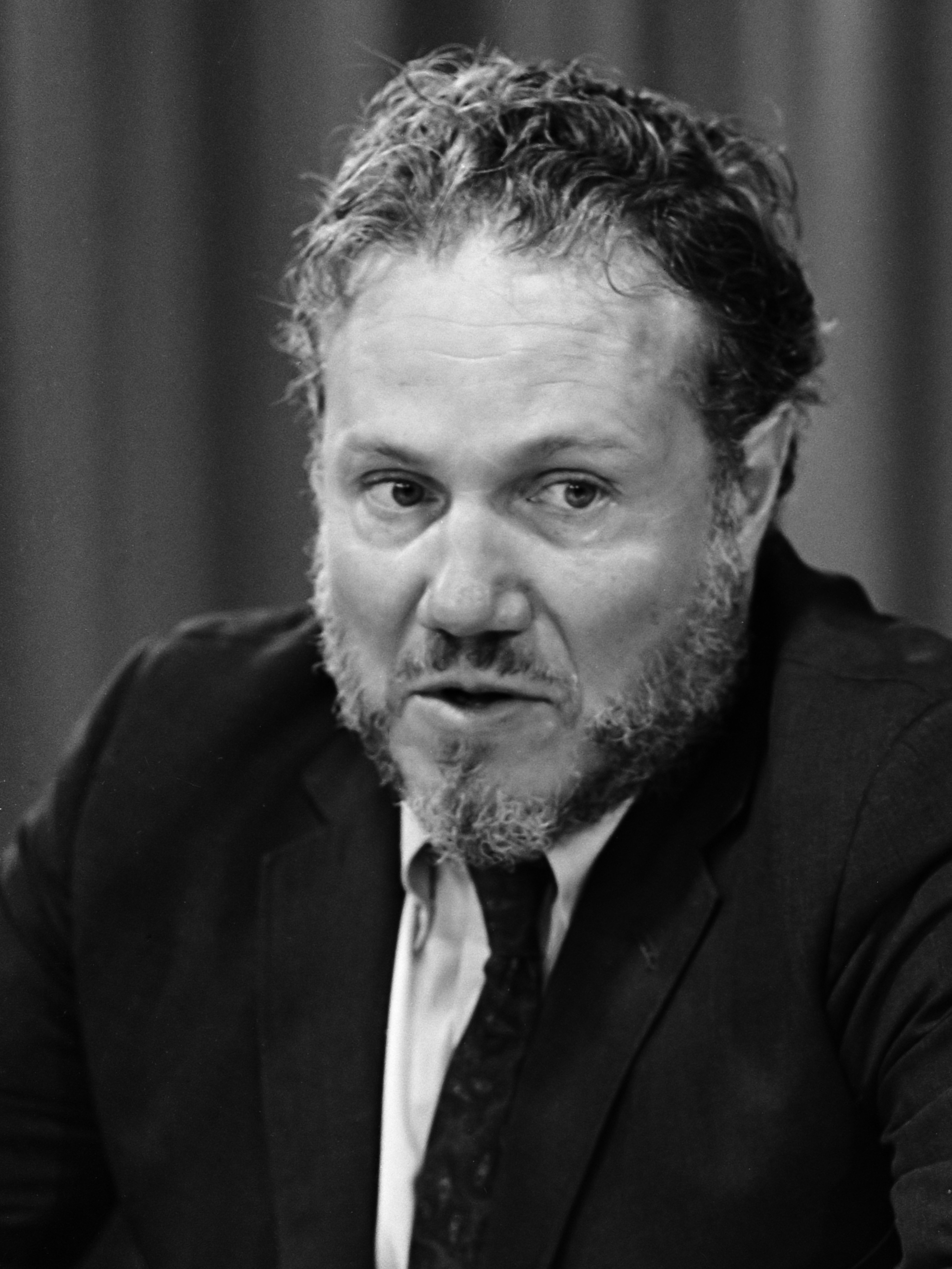
- Fiedler in 1967 (Photograph: Jac. de Nijs)
- Born: March 8, 1917; Newark, New Jersey, U.S.
- Died: January 29, 2003 (aged 85); Buffalo, New York, U.S.

Leslie Aaron Fiedler (March 8, 1917 – January 29, 2003) was an American literary critic, known for his interest in mythography and his championing of genre fiction. His work incorporates the application of psychological theories to American literature. Fiedler's best known work is the book Love and Death in the American Novel (1960). A retrospective article on Leslie Fiedler in the New York Times Book Review in 1965 referred to Love and Death in the American Novel as "one of the great, essential books on the American imagination ... an accepted major work." This work views in depth both American literature and character from the time of the American Revolution to the present. From it, there emerges Fiedler's once scandalous—now increasingly accepted—judgement that American literature is incapable of dealing with adult sexuality and is pathologically obsessed with death.

Our great novelists, though experts on indignity and assault, on loneliness and terror, tend to avoid treating the passionate encounter of a man and a woman, which we expect at the center of a novel. Indeed, they rather shy away from permitting in their fictions the presence of any full-fledged, mature women, giving us instead monsters of virtue or bitchery, symbols of the rejection or fear of sexuality.

— Leslie Fiedler, Love and Death in the American Novel

== Early life ==
Fiedler was born in Newark, New Jersey, to Jewish parents Lillian and Jacob Fiedler. "Eliezar Aaron" was his original Hebrew name. In his early years, he developed a strong connection to his grandparents. He attended South Side High School before majoring in English at New York University. After that, he attended the University of Wisconsin, from where he obtained both his M.A. in 1939, and his Ph.D. in 1941. Between 1943 and 1945, Fiedler served as a Japanese interpreter and military cryptologist in the U.S. Naval Reserve.

== Career ==
After World War II, Fiedler continued doing research at Harvard University. He taught at many universities both abroad and in the United States. He taught at the University of Montana (then Montana State University) from 1941 to 1965. In 1964, he began teaching at the University at Buffalo (UB) where he remained until his retirement. He was offered a postdoctoral fellowship at Harvard by the Rockefeller Foundation.

Besides essays and criticism, Fiedler was also a novelist and a short story writer.

=== The 1990s and beyond ===
In the 1990s, Fiedler's output decreased and new material was sporadic, but he received many honors in this period. In 1994, Fiedler received the Hubbell Medal for his lifetime contribution to the study of literature.

In April 1995, there was a celebration conference and performance in his honor called "Fiedlerfest" at the Center for the Arts at the State University of New York at Buffalo. Several famous writers such as Allen Ginsberg, Camille Paglia and Ishmael Reed paid homage to him and his works. Considered one of the most influential figures in 20th century American cultural thought, Fiedler is the author of over 40 works, some of which have been used in many courses in American universities. The conference originated from an idea that Fiedler's friend and colleague Bruce Jackson had in 1994. The idea was that the University of Buffalo should do something to celebrate their best-known professor and literary critic while he was still alive. They asked Fiedler to name the key speakers of the conference and he selected three people he admired: Camille Paglia, Allen Ginsberg, and Ishmael Reed. The university funded the event, which also had the participation of a master Daejaeng player related to one of the Korean students in the English Department, who played in Fiedler's honor. The art theorist, feminist academic and critic Camille Paglia performed on Saturday night. On Sunday afternoon, at 4 pm, it was the turn of beatnik poet Allen Ginsberg to perform. Ginsberg was an old friend of Fiedler's and had written the poem "Uptown" about Fiedler's children after their arrival in New York, coming from Missoula, MT to start a band. He read his poems while playing a small hand-pumped harmonium from India. He was later followed by the Daejaeng performance. American poet, songwriter, novelist, playwright and essayist Ishmael Reed was the last to perform. The celebration culminated with a reception in the Center for the Arts Atrium at UB.

In 1998, Fiedler was given the National Book Critics Circle Ivan Sandrof Lifetime Achievement Award. On January 29, 2003, a month before his 86th birthday, he died in Buffalo.

== Personal life ==
Fiedler was married to Margaret Ann Shipley from 1939 until their 1972 divorce. In 1973, he married Sally Andersen; they remained married until his death. Fiedler had six children and two stepchildren.

== Awards ==
- Two Fulbright Fellowships (1951, 1962)
- A Guggenheim Fellowship (1970)
- The Hubbell Medal for lifetime contribution to the study of literature (1994)
- Fiedlerfest, a series of conferences in his honor at SUNY, Buffalo. (1995)
- The Ivan Sandrof Award (1997) for lifetime achievement from the National Book Critics Circle.

== Works ==
- "Come Back to the Raft Ag'in, Huck Honey!" (1948)
- An End to Innocence: Essays on Culture and Politics (1955)
- "Nude Croquet." Esquire (September 1957)
- Nude Croquet and Other Stories of the Joys and Terrors of Marriage (1958) (stories, with others)
- Whitman (1959) (editor)
- The Jew in the American Novel (1959) Herzl Institute pamphlet
- No! In Thunder: Essays on Myth and Literature (1960)
- Love and Death in the American Novel (1960)
- Nude Croquet (1960)
- The Riddle of Shakespeare's Sonnets (1962) with R. P. Blackmur, Northrop Frye, Edward Hubler, Stephen Spender, Oscar Wilde
- Pull Down Vanity (1962) stories
- The Second Stone: A Love Story (1963) novel
- A Literary Guide to Seduction (1963) with Robert Meister
- The Continuing Debate: Essays on Education for Freshmen (1964) with Jacob Vinocur
- Waiting for the End: The American Literary Scene from Hemingway to Baldwin (1964)
- Back to China (1965) novel
- The Last Jew in America (1966) stories
- The Return of the Vanishing American (1968)
- O Brave New World: American Literature from 16001840 (1968) editor with Arthur Zeiger, City University of New York.
- Being Busted (1969)
- Nude croquet: The stories of Leslie A. Fiedler (1969)
- The Art of the Essay (1969) editor
- Cross the Border–Close the Gap (1972),
- Unfinished Business (1972) essays
- Collected Essays of Leslie Fiedler (1972)
- To the Gentiles (1972)
- The Stranger in Shakespeare (1972)
- Beyond The Looking Glass: Extraordinary Works of Fairy Tale and Fantasy (1973) editor, with Jonathan Cott
- "Rebirth of God, The Death of Man", an essay in Salmagundi: A Quarterly of the Humanities & Social Sciences, Winter, 1973, No. 21, pp. 3–27.
- The Messengers Will Come No More (1974)
- In Dreams Awake: A Historical-Critical Anthology of Science Fiction (1975, editor): a "historical-critical" anthology with "provocative introduction and commentary" (Scholes)
- A Fiedler Reader (1977)
- The Inadvertent Epic: From Uncle Tom's Cabin to Roots (1978) Massey Lecture
- Freaks: Myths and Images of the Secret Self (1978)
- English Literature: Opening Up the Canon, Selected Papers from the English Institute, 1979, New Series #4, edited by Leslie A. Fiedler and Houston A. Baker Jr., Baltimore and London: The Johns Hopkins University Press, 1981.
- What was literature?: Class Culture And Mass Society (1982)
- Buffalo Bill and the Wild West (1982)
- Olaf Stapledon: A Man Divided (1983)
- Fiedler on the Roof: Essays on Literature and Jewish Identity (1990)
- The Tyranny of the Normal: Essays on Bioethics, Theology & Myth (1996)
- A New Fiedler Reader (1999)

== See also ==
- Life Against Death

== Sources ==
- Mark Royden Winchell (1985) Leslie Fiedler
- Steven G. Kellman and Irving Malin, editors (1999) Leslie Fiedler and American Culture
- Mark Royden Winchell (2002) "Too Good to Be True": The Life and Work of Leslie Fiedler
