= Christian Gauss =

American literary critic and professor of literature (1878–1951)

- Born: Christian Frederick Gauss; February 2, 1878; Ann Arbor, Michigan
- Died: November 1, 1951 (aged 73); New York City, New York, US
- Occupations: Literary critic and professor
- Title: Chair of Modern Languages, Princeton University (1912–1936); Dean of the College, Princeton (1925–1946); President, Phi Beta Kappa (1946–1951)
- Awards: Knight of the Legion of Honor

Academic background
- Education: University of Michigan (BA)

Academic work
- Discipline: Literature
- Institutions: Princeton University (1905–1946)

Christian Frederick Gauss (February 2, 1878 – November 1, 1951) was an American literary critic and professor of literature at Princeton University. He was third dean of the college of Princeton, a chairman of its department of modern languages and director of its public relations, and president of Phi Beta Kappa. He was a mentor and friend to the writers Edmund Wilson and F. Scott Fitzgerald, a member of the national committee of the American Civil Liberties Union, and a Knight of the Legion of Honor of France.

== Early life and education ==
Gauss was born on February 2, 1878 to German emigrant parents in Ann Arbor, Michigan in 1878. His first language was German. His father had come from Baden and was a relative of the mathematician and physicist Carl Friedrich Gauss; he participated in the revolutions of 1848 in German states and was strongly anti-Prussian. He emigrated to the US after he fled Württemberg when Prussia began to dominate it in the 1860s.

Christian attended the University of Michigan and graduated after three years at age 20.

After graduation, Gauss worked as a newspaper correspondent in Paris covering the Dreyfus affair, particularly the trial at Rennes. During this time he met and befriended Oscar Wilde, who dedicated his poem "Ideal Love" to Gauss in 1899. In striking contrast to his later reputation, at this time Gauss was known as a long-haired bohemian "who wore a green jacket and was said to have worked his way through all the drugs mentioned in Baudelaire's Les Paradis Artificiels." During this period he published poetry under his own name and the pen name Sebastian de l'Isle.

== Academic career ==
Later Gauss taught at Michigan and Lehigh University in the United States, and in 1905 he became a first preceptor at Princeton University, where he remained until his retirement in 1946. At Princeton, Gauss became a full professor of French Literature two years after his arrival; he was chairman of the department of modern languages 1912–1936; he was director of public relations; and he served as the third dean of the college from 1925.

Among the Princeton students he influenced and corresponded frequently with were F. Scott Fitzgerald, Harold Medina, Paul Elmer More, and Edmund Wilson. Wilson credited him with inspiring Fitzgerald's development as a writer between This Side of Paradise and The Great Gatsby. He was particularly remembered as a champion of Gustave Flaubert, Dante Alighieri, and Ernest Renan.

During this period he wrote extensively for periodicals and newspapers including The Saturday Evening Post, The New York Times, the Saturday Review, and The New Republic. His book Life in College (1930) was assembled from a series of Saturday Evening Post articles and dedicated to the students he disciplined as dean. He was politically associated with the socialist, non-communist left and critiqued prevailing contemporary economic systems in his book A Primer for Tomorrow (1934). He was a member of the national committee of the American Civil Liberties Union.

On his retirement in 1946, the honorary position of dean of alumni was created for him. After retiring, he served as president of Phi Beta Kappa. He also began to speak to African-American audiences in the South and to work for racial integration in churches. He was made a Knight of the French Legion of Honor and received six honorary degrees. His last work was an introduction for a new edition of The Prince by Niccolò Machiavelli, finished in October 1951.

Gauss died on November 1, 1951, of heart failure, while waiting for a return train to Princeton from Penn Station in New York City.

== Legacy ==
Though he was not a prolific author or a public figure, Gauss left a mark on literary scholarship: Princeton University's semiannual series of Christian Gauss Seminars in Criticism (founded in 1949 by R. P. Blackmur) and Phi Beta Kappa's annual Christian Gauss Award (est. 1950, for a book of literary criticism) are named in his honor. Edmund Wilson's Axel's Castle is dedicated to him.

== Sources ==
- Cooper, John (July 2022). "Three Times Tried: How 'Un Amant de Nos Jours' Became 'The New Remorse' Which Became 'Ideal Love'". The Wildean (61): 21–43. JSTOR 48827782. See also the associated blog entry with video
- Edel, Leon (Winter 1982). "Criticism's Double Agent". Grand Street. 1 (2): 143–150. doi:10.2307/25006400. JSTOR 25006400.
- Leitch, Alexander (1978). "Christian Gauss". A Princeton Companion. Princeton University Press. Archived from the original on February 12, 2006.
- Stauffer, Donald A. (April 1952). "Christian Gauss". The Journal of Higher Education. 23 (4): 180–184. doi:10.2307/1976776. JSTOR 1976776.
- Wilson, Edmund (Summer 1952). "Portrait: Christian Gauss". The American Scholar. 21 (3): 345–355. JSTOR 41206918.
