= The Great Tradition =

1948 book of literary criticism by F R Leavis

- First US edition
- Author: F R Leavis
- Language: English
- Genre: Non-fiction
- Publisher: George W. Stewart; Chatto & Windus
- Publication date: 1948

The Great Tradition is a book of literary criticism written by F. R. Leavis, published in 1948 by Chatto & Windus.

== Highlights of the book ==
In his work, Leavis names Jane Austen, George Eliot, Henry James, and Joseph Conrad as the great English novelists. Within his argument he adds D. H. Lawrence to the pantheon of great novelists in English, though Leavis discusses Lawrence more in later works.

Leavis disparaged Dickens except for his novel Hard Times, as lacking the "mature standards and interests" found in the works of Henry James. There was a similar contrast on the aspect of using melodrama in the novels, as compared to Joseph Conrad. In one statement on page 19, Leavis places Dickens among classic writers, but not in the great tradition: "That Dickens was a great genius and is permanently among the classics is certain. But the genius was that of a great entertainer, and he had for the most part no profounder responsibility as a creative artist than this description suggests."

Leavis held great sway over literary criticism of English literature until his death in 1978. Other views have emerged since then, in support of a greater number of authors.
