= Bob Stratton Bald =

Mountain in North Carolina, United States

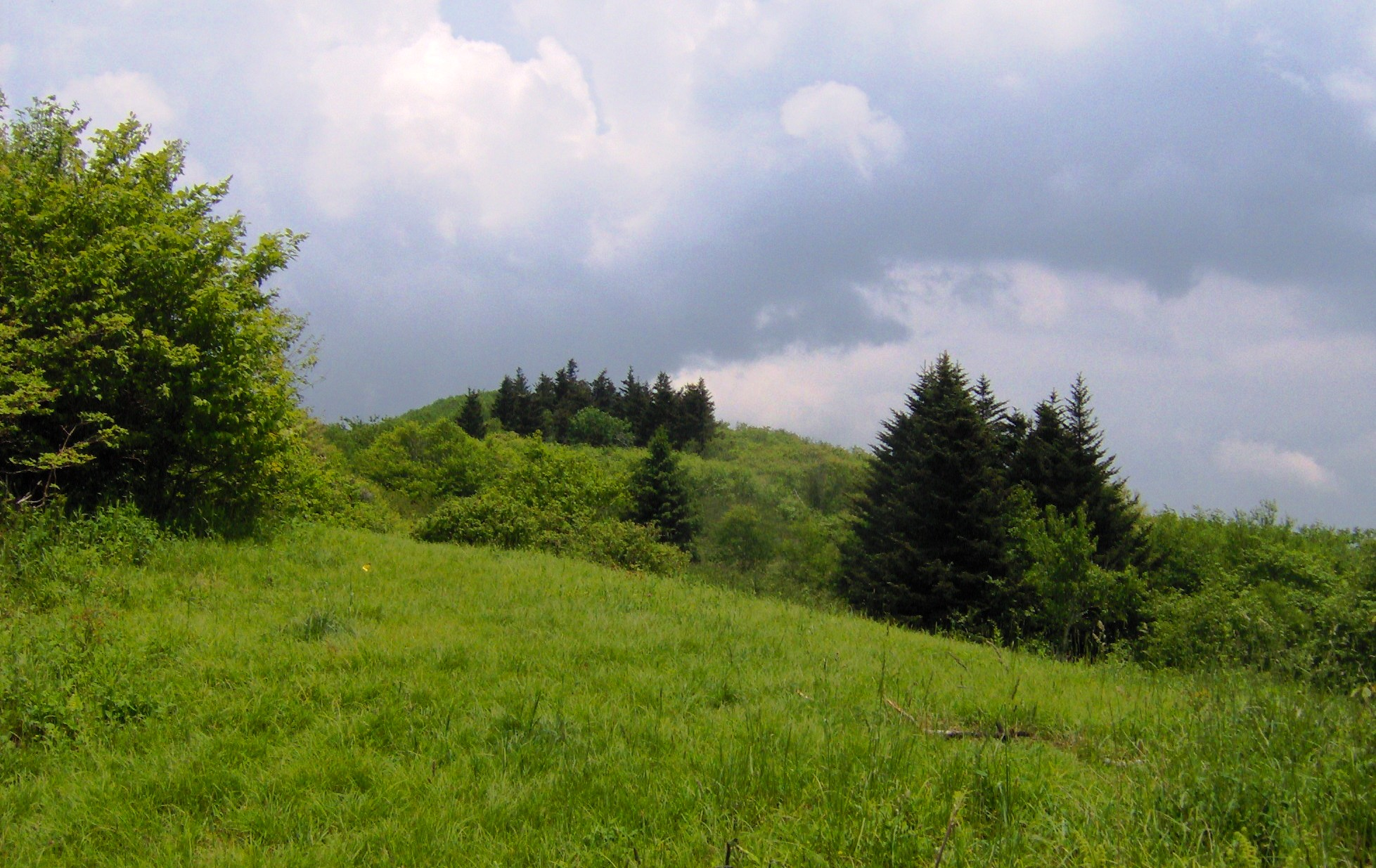

Highest point
- Elevation: 5,360 ft (1,630 m)
- Prominence: 1,040 ft (320 m)
- Coordinates: 35°22′24″N 83°59′35″W

Geography
- Location within North Carolina
- Location: Graham County, North Carolina
- Parent range: Unicoi Mountains, Blue Ridge Mountains, Appalachian Mountains

Bob Stratton Bald, often referred to as Stratton Bald, is a grassy bald in the Unicoi Mountains located in the Joyce Kilmer-Slickrock Wilderness in the Nantahala National Forest. Its elevation is approximately 5,360 feet.

== Description ==
The bald is named for Robert "Bob" Stratton (1825-1864), whose family lived on the bald.

The bald is subdivided into two smaller balds: Stratton Bald (elevation 5,360 feet), and Bob Bald (elevation 5,280 feet). Together, they make up Bob Stratton Bald. It is a typical Appalachian bald, with thick grass and few trees and is a popular hiking destination for backpackers. It is accessible via the Stratton Bald Trail (FS Trail 54), which connects to the Benton MacKaye Trail and the Cherohala Skyway.

== See also ==
- Unicoi Mountains
- Appalachian balds
- Nantahala National Forest
- Joyce Kilmer Memorial Forest
- Hooper Bald
