= Haw Knob =

Mountain in the southeastern United States

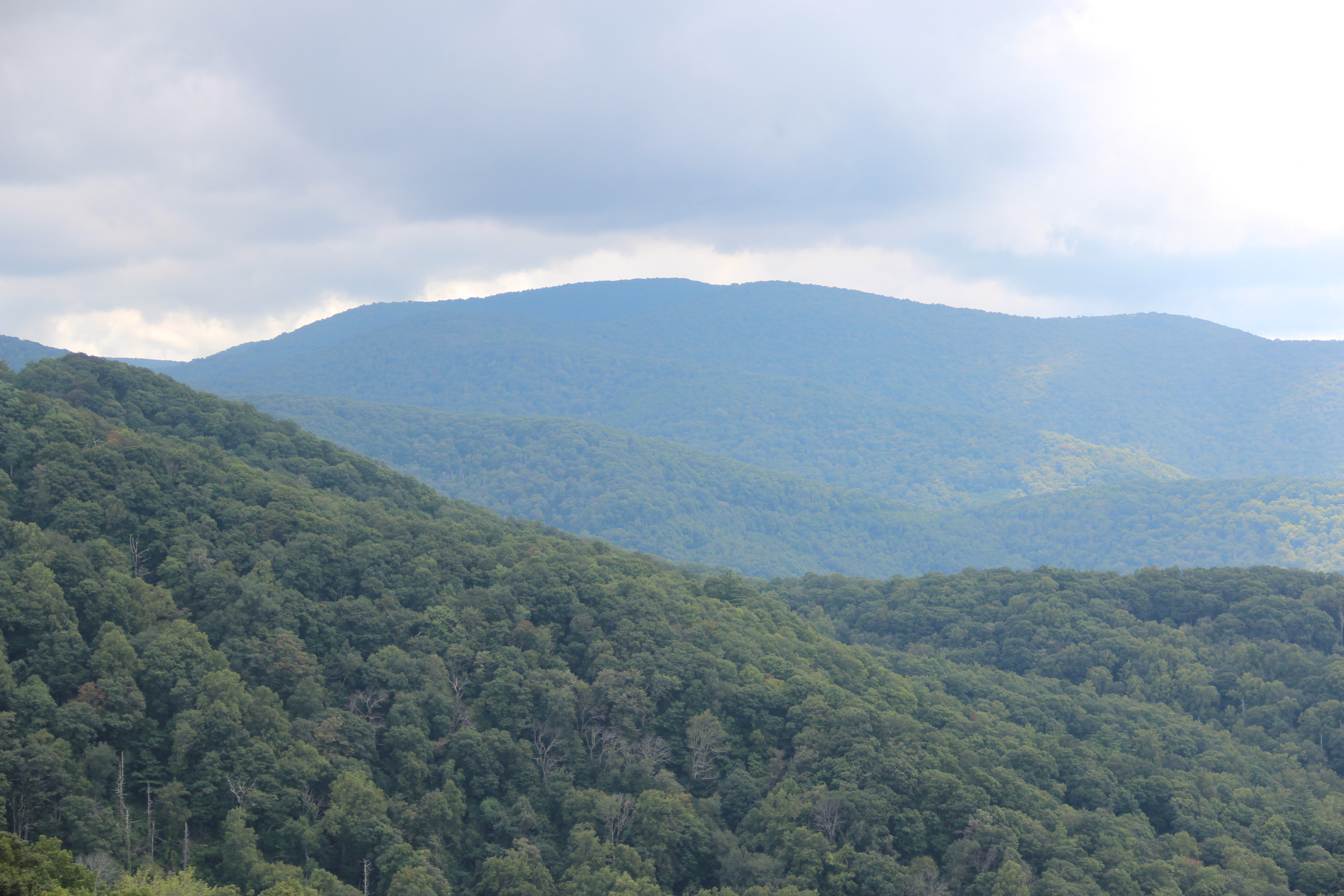
- Haw Knob from the Cherohala Skyway

Highest point
- Elevation: 5,472 ft (1,668 m)
- Prominence: 192 ft (59 m)
- Coordinates: 35°18′34″N 84°01′36″W

Geography
- Location: Monroe County, Tennessee, Graham County, North Carolina, United States
- Parent range: Unicoi Mountains

Climbing
- Access: Benton MacKaye Trail

Haw Knob is a mountain located in the central Unicoi Mountains in the southeastern United States. The peak is located in Monroe County, Tennessee and Graham County, North Carolina, and has an elevation of 5,472 feet (1,668 m) above mean sea level. It located near the Cherohala Skyway and is accessible via the Benton MacKaye Trail.

== Geography ==
Haw Knob is located in the Cherokee National Forest in Tennessee and the Nantahala National Forest in North Carolina. The Cherohala Skyway runs along the prominence of the mountain, but the peak is only accessible via the Benton MacKaye Trail. Haw Knob also contains the highest elevation in Monroe County, Tennessee.

== See also ==
- Unicoi Mountains
- Appalachian balds
- Nantahala National Forest
- Joyce Kilmer Memorial Forest
