= Hooper Bald =

Mountain in North Carolina, United States

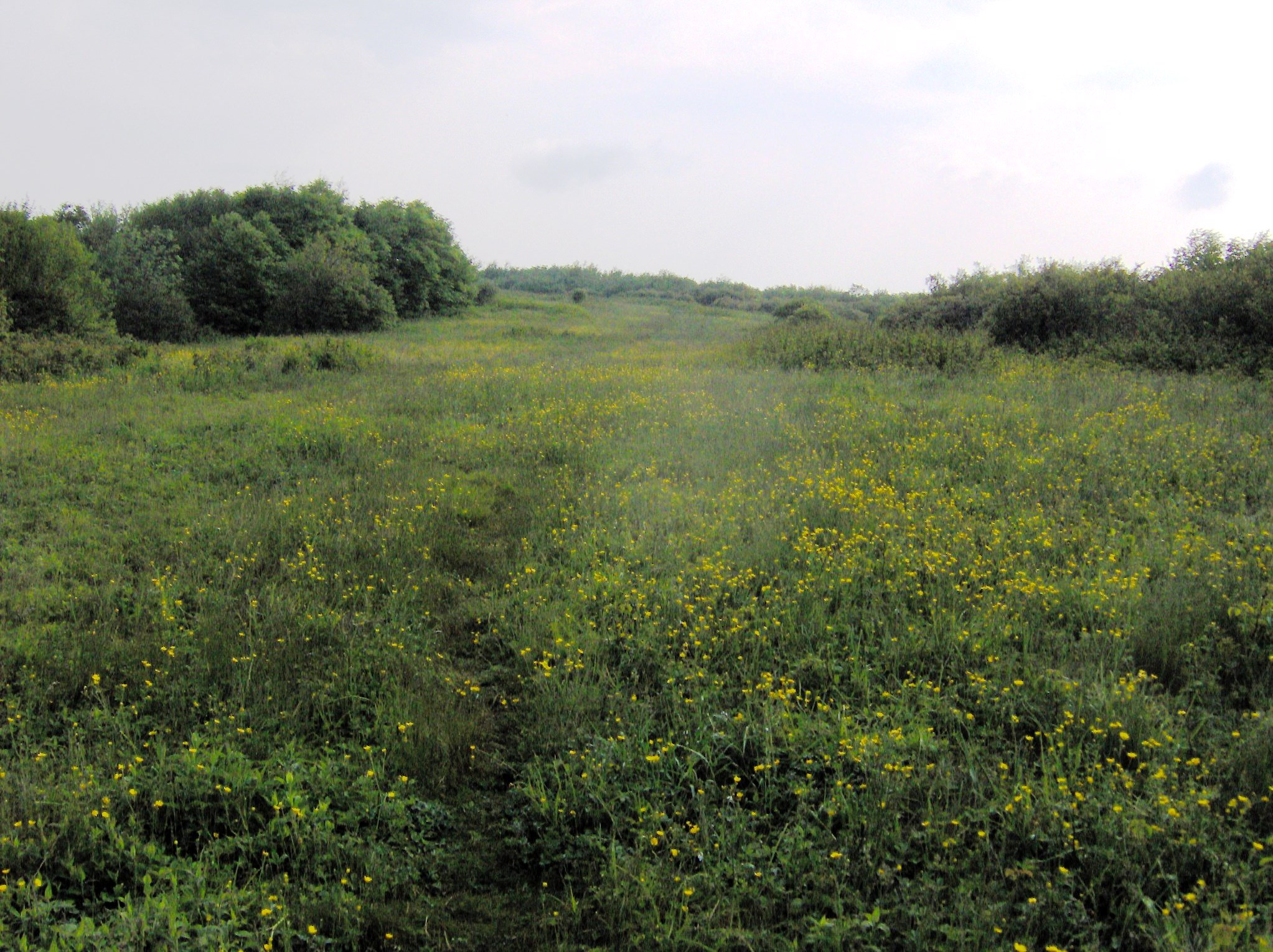
- Hooper Bald in summer

Highest point
- Elevation: 1,655 m (5,430 ft)
- Coordinates: 35°18′21″N 83°59′38″W

Geography
- Location: Graham County, North Carolina, United States
- Parent range: Unicoi Mountains; Blue Ridge Mountains; Appalachian Mountains

Climbing
- Easiest route: Hike

Hooper Bald is a grassy bald mountain in the Unicoi Mountain Range located in the Cheoah Ranger District (northwestern district) of Nantahala National Forest in Graham County, North Carolina, United States. The summit is 5,429 ft/1,655 m.

== Hiking ==
The summit of Hooper Bald can be reached via the 0.5 mile Hooper Bald Trail. The parking area and trailhead is located between mile marker 7 and 8 along the North Carolina side of the Cherohala Skyway.

== See also ==
- List of major Appalachian Balds
- Joyce Kilmer-Slickrock Wilderness
- Joyce Kilmer Memorial Forest
- Robbinsville, North Carolina
- Tellico Plains, Tennessee
- Bob Stratton Bald
