= Citico Creek Wilderness =

Wilderness area in Tennessee, U.S.

- IUCN category Ib (wilderness area)
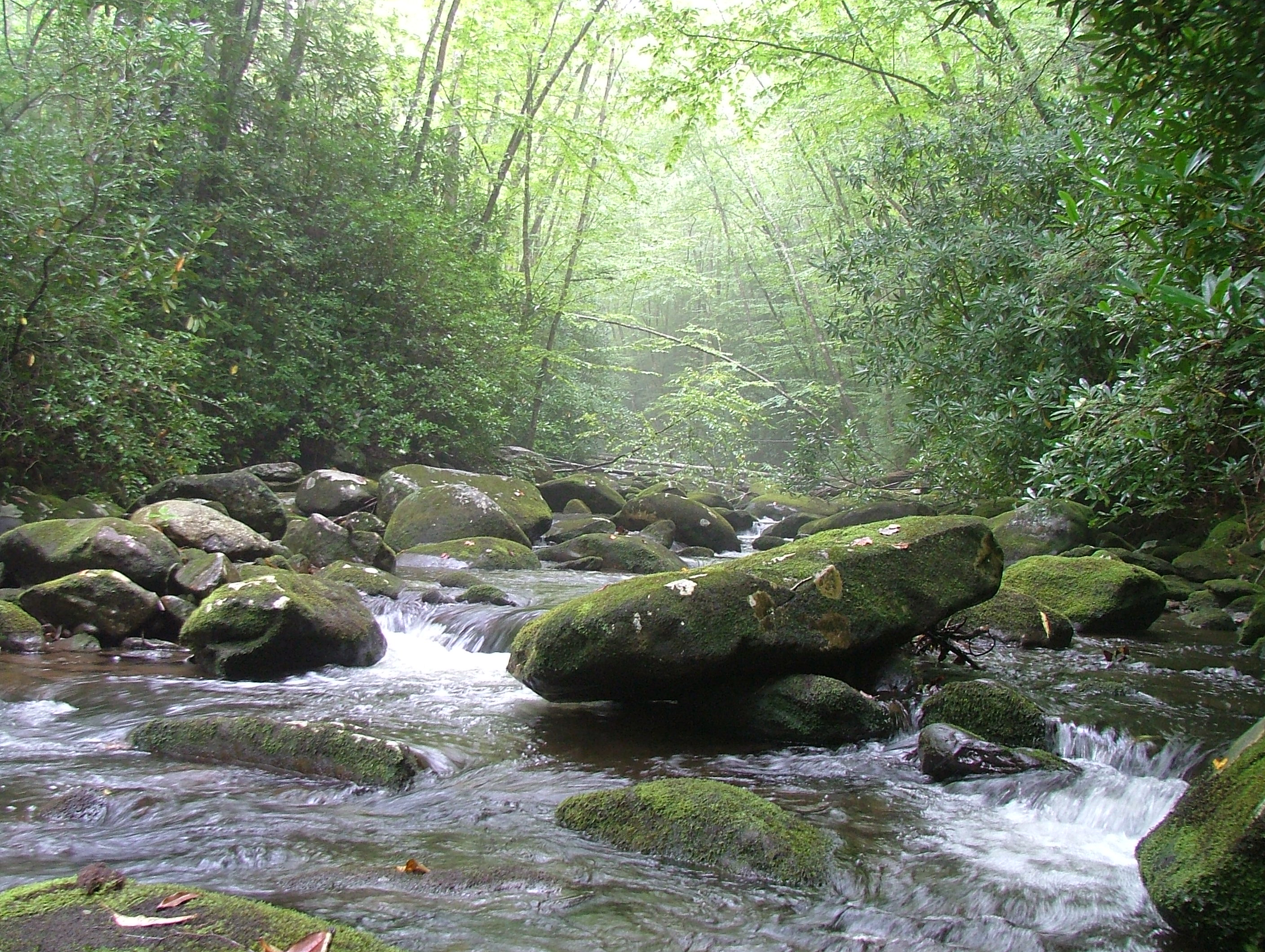
- Interactive map of Citico Creek Wilderness
- Location: Monroe County, Tennessee, USA
- Nearest city: Tapoco, North Carolina
- Coordinates: 35°24′17″N 84°03′02″W
- Area: 16,226 acres (66 km^{2})
- Established: 1984
- Governing body: U.S. Forest Service

Citico Creek Wilderness is a 16,226-acre (66 km^{2}) wilderness area within the Cherokee National Forest in the U.S. state of Tennessee. The wilderness contains the entire upper drainage of Citico Creek, which consists of the north and south forks and at least eight tributaries. Three steep-sided ridges descend west from the crest of the Unicoi Mountains — Brush Mountain, Pine Ridge, and Sassafras Ridge.

== History ==
Citico Creek is named after the ancient Overhill Cherokee village of Citico, which was located at the creek's mouth along the Little Tennessee River. The village site was inundated by the creation of Tellico Reservoir in 1979.

Most of the Citico Creek watershed was logged in the early 1920s by the Babcock Lumber Company, and most of what was not logged was destroyed by a massive forest fire in 1925. The United States Forest Service purchased the devastated land in the 1930s, and its policy of allowing natural processes to heal the forest has led to the development of a mature, second-growth deciduous forest along Citico Creek.

== Forest ==
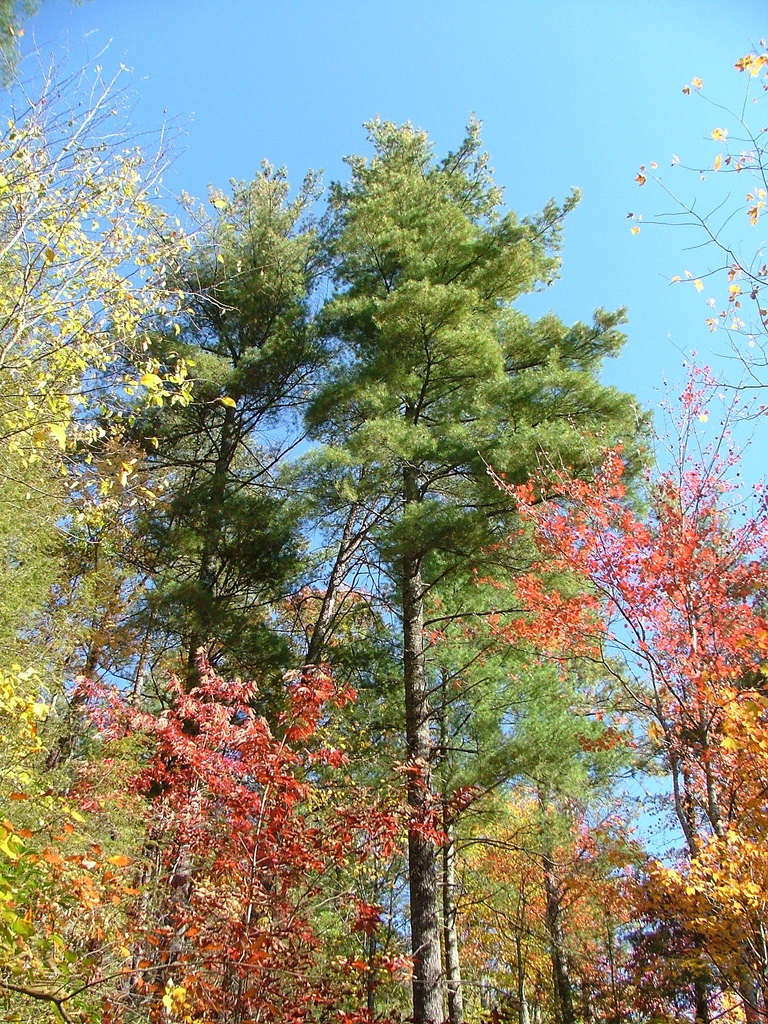
Citico Creek Wilderness forest with Pinus strobus.

Diverse cove hardwood forests — which include yellow poplar, white oak, red oak, and hemlock — are found in the bottomlands along stream beds. The ridge slopes are covered by a mixed hardwood-pine forest consisting primarily of white oak, red oak, and hickory in moist areas and substantial stands of white pine, pitch pine, and shortleaf pine on drier slopes and ridgecrests.

While most of the forest is second-growth, two pockets of old growth forest remain within the wilderness area. One is a 187-acre (0.76 km^{2}) stand of primarily beech and maple in the vicinity of Falls Branch Falls, which is easily accessible from the Cherohala Skyway via the Falls Branch Falls Trail. The other is an isolated 200-acre (0.81 km^{2}) patch of hemlock near Glenn Gap.

== Recreation and protection ==
Citico Creek Wilderness is bordered on the east by the Joyce Kilmer-Slickrock Wilderness and on the north by the Great Smoky Mountains National Park (on the other side of the Little Tennessee River). The Bald River Gorge Wilderness is located immediately to the southwest. The Cherohala Skyway traverses the southern boundary of the Citico Creek Wilderness, and the Benton MacKaye Trail roughly follows its eastern boundary.

== See also ==
- Appalachian Mountains
- Blue Ridge Mountains
- List of U.S. Wilderness Areas
- Wilderness Act
