= Cherohala Skyway =

Scenic highway in North Carolina and Tennessee

Cherohala Skyway

Route information
- Maintained by TDOT & NCDOT
- Length: 43 mi (69 km)
- Existed: October 11, 1996–present
- Component highways: SR 165 (Tennessee); NC 143 (North Carolina)

Location
- Country: United States
- States: Tennessee, North Carolina
- Counties: Monroe, TN; Graham, NC

Highway system
- Scenic Byways; National; National Forest; BLM; NPS
- Tennessee State Routes; Interstate; US; State
- North Carolina Highway System; Interstate; US; State; Scenic

The Cherohala Skyway is a 43-mile (69 km) National Scenic Byway and National Forest Scenic Byway that connects Tellico Plains, Tennessee, to Robbinsville, North Carolina, in the southeastern United States. Its name is a portmanteau of Cherokee and Nantahala, the two national forests through which it passes. Along with multiple vistas and overlooks, the skyway provides easy vehicular access to various protected and recreational areas of the Unicoi Mountains, including the Citico Creek Wilderness, the Bald River Gorge Wilderness, and the remote interior of the Joyce Kilmer Memorial Forest.

Planning for the Cherohala Skyway began in 1958 and the road was completed on October 12, 1996, at a final cost of about $100,000,000. The western (or Tennessee) half of the skyway follows Tennessee State Route 165 for nearly 25 miles (40 km) from Tellico Plains to the state line at Stratton Gap. The eastern (or North Carolina) half follows North Carolina Highway 143 for just over 18 miles (29 km) from Stratton Gap to Robbinsville. The skyway gains over 4,000 feet (1,200 m) in elevation, rising from a low point of just under 900 feet (270 m) at Tellico Plains to a high point of just over 5,400 feet (1,600 m) on the slopes of Haw Knob near the Tennessee-North Carolina state line. The North Carolina half of the skyway terminates near the south shore of Lake Santeetlah.

On Aug. 31, 1982, nine U.S. Air Force members were killed on the Graham County side of the skyway when their plane crashed near John's Knob and Stratton Ridge during a storm. No one survived the crash. The plane was conducting a training exercise at the time. In 2015, a memorial was built near the skyway. Victims' families have since requested the memorial be moved to a more accessible location at the Stratton Ridge Rest Area.

== Route description ==
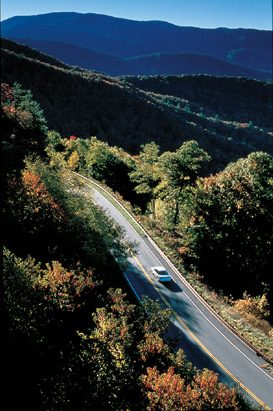
Cherohala Skyway in early autumn

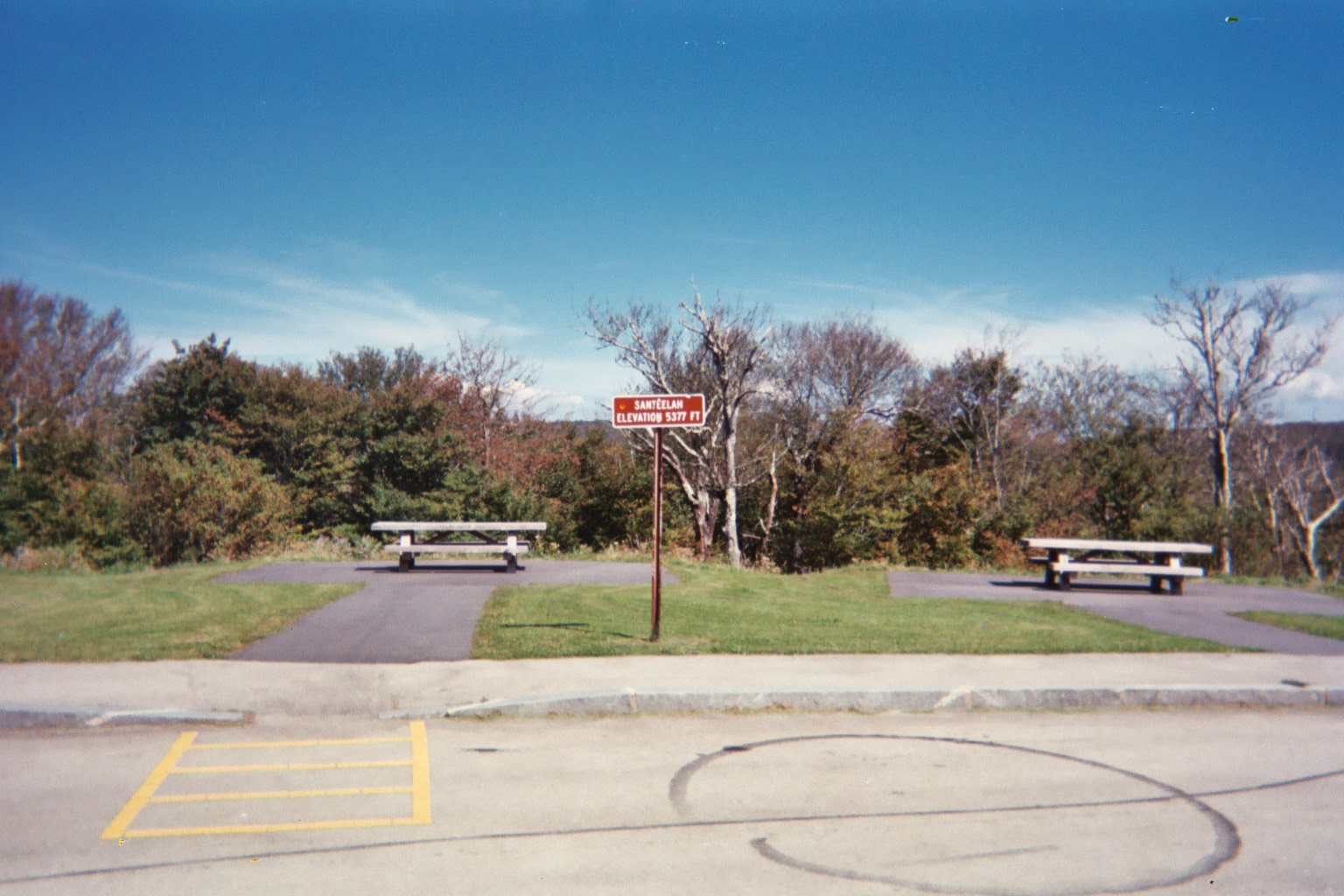
High point of the Skyway

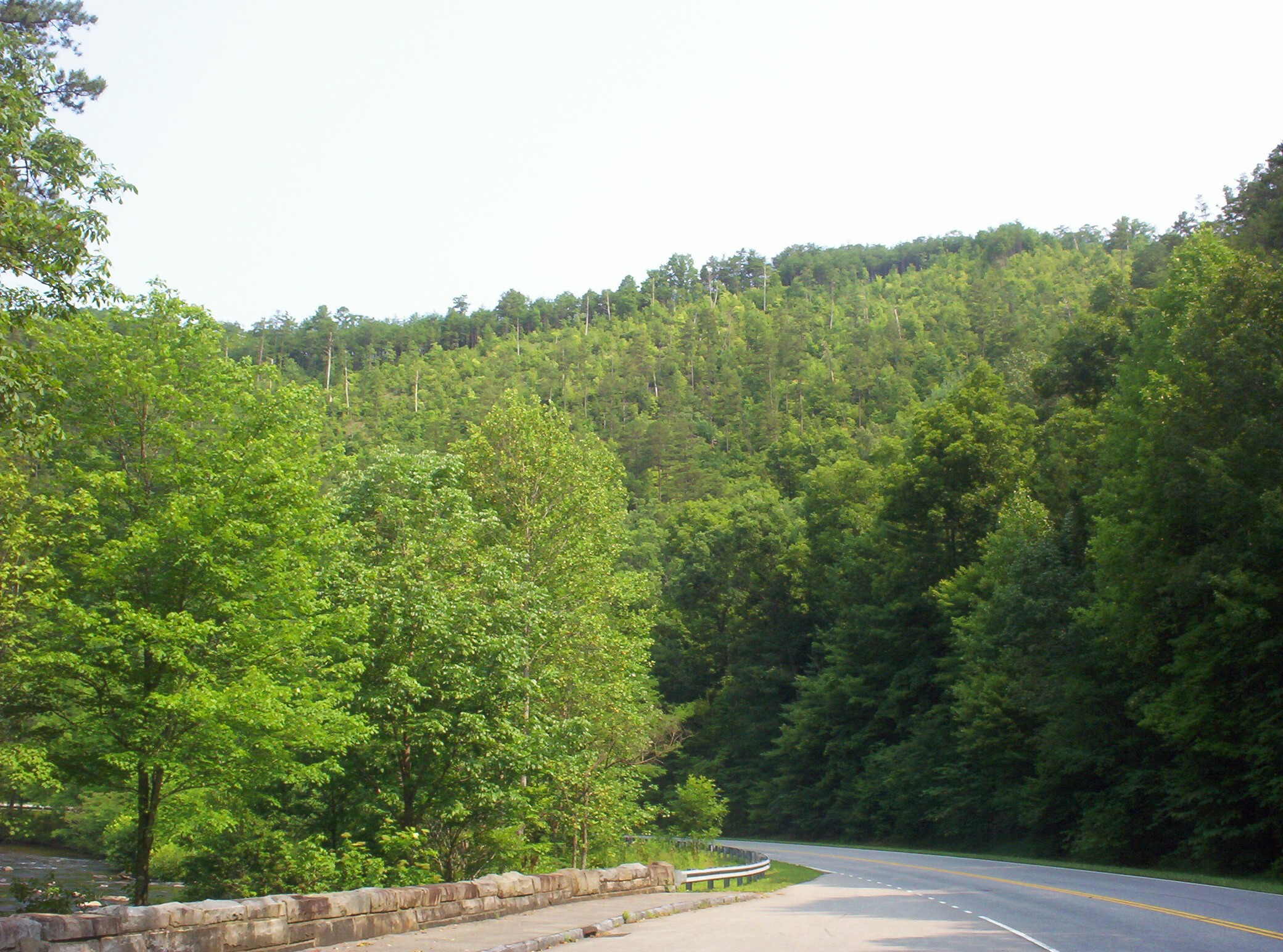
View at end of Skyway near Tellico Plains

=== Skyway highlights ===
- Santeetlah Gap (Mile 0) — junction with Kilmer Road, which accesses Joyce Kilmer Memorial Forest
- Hooper Cove (Mile 2) — picnic area
- Shute Cove (Mile 3) — picnic area
- Huckleberry Knob (Mile 9) — short trail to the summit of Huckleberry Knob (elev. 5,560 ft or 1,690 m)
- Hooper Bald (Mile 10) — short trail to the summit of Hooper Bald (elev. 5,429 ft or 1,655 m)
- Santeetlah Overlook (Mile 11) — 5,390-foot (1,640 m) view of the upper Santeetlah Creek watershed
- Big Junction Overlook (Mile 12) — View south from the 5,235-foot (1,596 m) gap between Haw Knob and Big Junction
- Stratton Ridge (Mile 16) — picnic area; Benton MacKaye Trail access
- Cherohala Skyway Welcome Plaza (Mile 17) — picnic area; connection to Forest Service Roads 81/Old Santeetlah Road and 217/North River Road
- Unicoi Crest (Mile 18) — Tennessee-North Carolina state line, view of the Tellico River valley
- Falls Branch Falls Trail (Mile 21) — short trail through a patch of old growth forest to a 55-foot (17 m) cascade waterfall
- Lake View Overlook (Mile 25)
- Turkey Creek Overlook (Mile 27)
- Forest Service Road 345/Indian Boundary Road (Mile 29) to Indian Boundary Lake campground
- Forest Service Road 210/River Road (Mile 39) to Tellico District Ranger Station and Bald River Falls
- Cherohala Skyway Visitor Center and Charles Hall Museum (Mile 43)
