= Starr Mountain =

Mountain in Tennessee, United States

- Location within Tennessee

Highest point
- Elevation: 2,340 ft (710 m)
- Coordinates: 35°16′26″N 84°30′32″W

Geography
- Location: Polk, McMinn, and Monroe Counties, Tennessee, United States
- Parent range: Unicoi Mountains

Starr Mountain is a mountain in the U.S. state of Tennessee. It is located in the Unicoi range of the Blue Ridge Mountains, part of the larger Appalachian Mountains, and is within the boundaries of the Cherokee National Forest.

== Geography ==
Starr Mountain is a long ridge running approximately north-northeast, and reaches a maximum elevation of approximately 2,340 feet (710 m). It is one of the southernmost mountains of the Unicoi Mountains, and is also on the western edge of the Blue Ridge province, bordered by the Ridge-and-Valley Appalachians to the west. The Hiwassee River flows along its southern base, separating it from Oswald Dome. Starr Mountain is located in Polk, McMinn, and Monroe counties, and its highest point is also the highest point in McMinn County.
