= Unicoi Mountains =

Mountain range in North Carolina, United States

Coordinates: 35°14′32″N 84°5′13″W

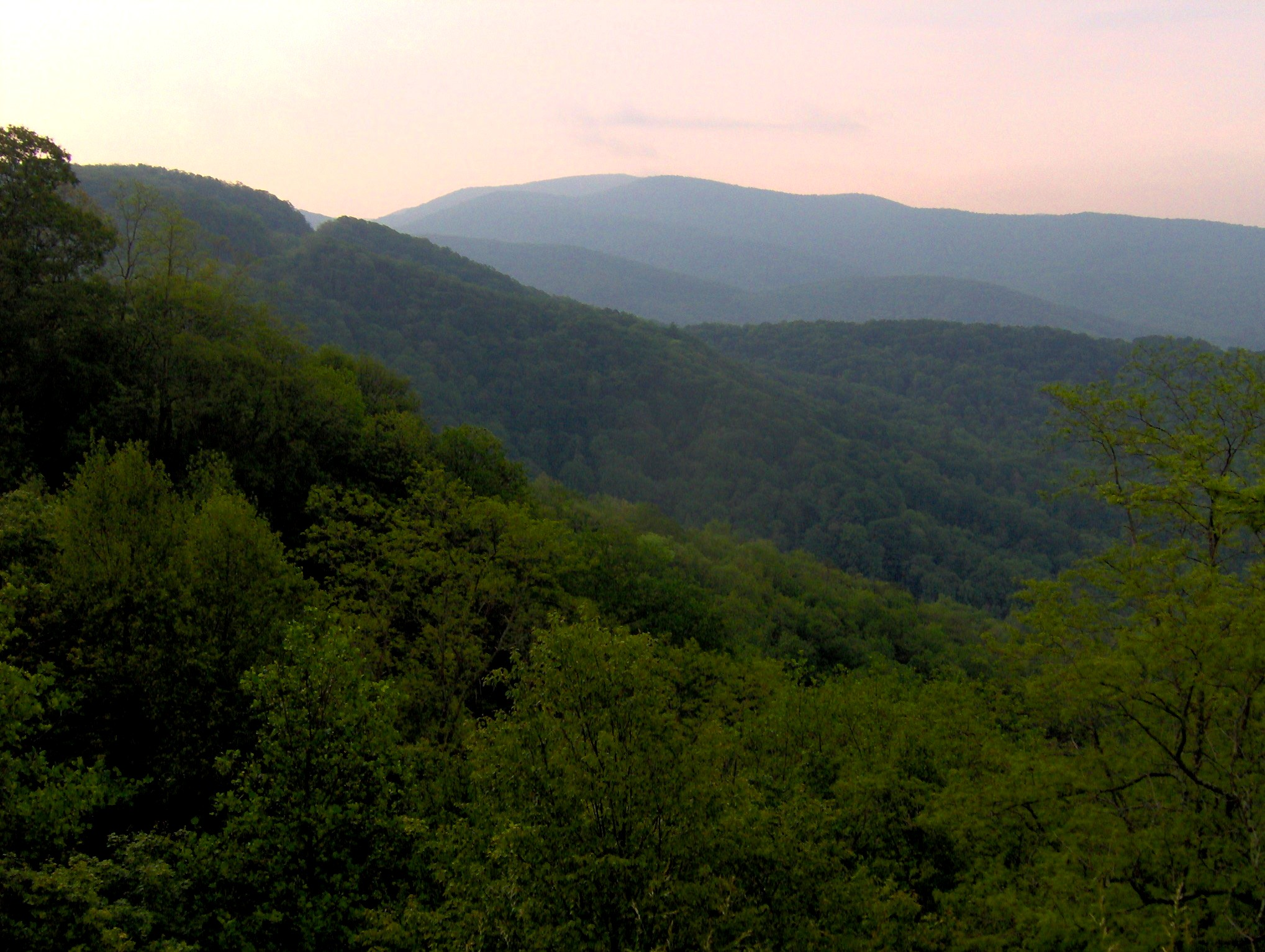
- The Unicoi Mountains

Highest point
- Peak: Huckleberry Knob
- Elevation: 5,560 ft (1,690 m)

Geography
- Appalachian Mountain system
- Country: United States
- States: North Carolina; Tennessee
- Parent range: Blue Ridge Mountains
- Borders on: Great Smoky Mountains

Geology
- Orogeny: Alleghenian

The Unicoi Mountains are a mountain range rising along the border between Tennessee and North Carolina in the southeastern United States. They are part of the Blue Ridge Mountain Province of the Southern Appalachian Mountains. The Unicois are located immediately south of the Great Smoky Mountains and immediately west of the Cheoah Mountains. Most of the range is protected as a national forest, namely the Cherokee National Forest on the Tennessee side and the Nantahala National Forest on the North Carolina side— although some parts have been designated as wilderness areas and are thus more strictly regulated.

The Unicoi Mountains remain one of the most primitive, undeveloped areas in the eastern United States. Human habitation in the range's river valleys and deep hollows was never dense. While logging occurred in the 19th and 20th centuries, logging operations in the Unicoi area were not as extensive as in other forested areas in the region.

The Joyce Kilmer Memorial Forest, located in the northeastern Unicois, is home to one of the last remaining old growth cove hardwood forests in the eastern United States. Grassy balds and heath balds are seen atop summits in the Unicoi Mountains, the highest of which rise to elevations of over 5,000 feet. The Cherohala Skyway— a National Scenic Byway completed in 1996— traverses the crest of the Unicoi Mountains connecting Tellico Plains, Tennessee with Robbinsville, North Carolina.

The name "Unicoi" comes from the Cherokee word ᎤᏁᎦ (unega), which means "white." It refers to the low-lying clouds and fog that often drape the Southern Appalachian mountains in the early morning or on humid or moist days. The name Unaka— which historically refers to the mountains along the Tennessee–North Carolina border— has the same Cherokee root as "Unicoi." There it is said to be associated with the white of the long chestnut blooms that were prevalent in spring in the mountains, before the Chestnut blight.

== Geography ==
The Unicoi Mountains stretch for roughly 37 miles (60 km) between the Little Tennessee River in the north and the Hiwassee River to the south, and for approximately 60 miles (97 km) from its foothills along the Tennessee River at the range's western extreme to the Cheoah River at its eastern extreme. The range covers just over 1,000 square miles (2,600 km^{2}).

The sources of several rivers and major streams are located high in the Unicoi Mountains. The Tellico River rises on the slopes of McDaniel Bald in the southeastern corner of the Unicois and flows northwestward across the entire range before emptying into the Little Tennessee River near Vonore, Tennessee. Another tributary of the Little Tennessee, Citico Creek, is formed by the convergence of two streams which rise in a densely forested area of the northwestern Unicois known as Jeffrey Hell. The Bald River rises on the slopes of Beaverdam Bald in the southern Unicois and winds its way northward through a scenic gorge before plunging over an oft-photographed 90-foot (27 m) waterfall less than 50 yards from where it empties into the Tellico River. Santeetlah Creek rises on the western slope of Huckleberry Knob and flows down around the base of the mountain en route to the Santeetlah Lake impoundment of the Cheoah River to the east. Its tributary, Little Santeetlah Creek, drains the Joyce Kilmer Memorial Forest.

=== Major peaks ===
The highest summits in the Unicoi Range rise above 5,000 feet (1,500 meters), although most fall between 4,000 and 5,000 feet along the two crests and between 3,000 and 4,000 feet beyond the crest to the east and west. Huckleberry Knob— the highest mountain in the Unicoi Range at 5,560 feet (1,690 m)— has 3,400 feet (1,000 m) of topographical prominence. Other summits with 1,000+ feet of prominence include Bob Stratton Bald along the southern boundary of the Joyce Kilmer-Slickrock Wilderness and Beaverdam Bald in the southern part of the range. The Benton MacKaye Trail, a cross-country hiking trail that traverses the Southern Appalachian Mountains, passes over several summits in the Unicois.

Mountain	Elevation	General area	Coordinates	Access
Huckleberry Knob	5,560 ft/1,695 m	Central Unicois	35.3221, -83.9939	Huckleberry Trail
Big Junction	5,480 ft/1,670 m	Central Unicois	35.30526, -84.013994	Cherohala Skyway
Haw Knob	5,472 ft/1,668 m	Central Unicois	35.309621, -84.026652	Benton MacKaye Trail
Hooper Bald	5,429 ft/1,655 m	Central Unicois	35.30584, -83.99392	Hooper Bald Trail
Stratton Bald	5,360 ft/1,634 m	Joyce Kilmer-Slickrock Wilderness	35.373403, -83.992979	Stratton Bald Trail (#54)
Bob Bald	5,282 ft/1,610 m	Joyce Kilmer-Slickrock Wilderness	35.37093, -84.00069	Stratton Bald Trail (#54)
Haoe	5,249 ft/1,600 m	Joyce Kilmer-Slickrock Wilderness	35.385954, -83.969372	Trail #53
Johns Knob	4,908 ft/1,496 m	Central Unicois	35.330974, -84.030215	Benton MacKaye Trail
McDaniel Bald	4,640 ft/1,414 m	Southeastern Unicois	35.3144444, -83.9927778	
Rockstack	4,420 ft/1,347 m	CCW/JKSW boundary	35.397674, -84.013865	Benton MacKaye Trail
Big Fodderstack	4,346 ft/1,325 m	CCW/JKSW boundary	35.412352, -84.027499	Benton MacKaye Trail
Beaverdam Bald	4,259 ft/1,298 m	Southern Unicois	35.249941, -84.125076	Benton MacKaye Trail
Hemlock Knob	4,019 ft/1,225 m	Citico Creek Wilderness	35.359615, -84.103051	Cherohala Skyway
Cedar Top	4,008 ft/1,222 m	Eastern Unicois	35.32586, -83.92692	
Ikes Peak	3,820 ft/1,164 m	Citico Creek Wilderness	35.38496, -84.05371	
Salt Spring Mountain	3,155 ft/962 m	Citico Creek Wilderness	35.46476, -84.05253	
Starr Mountain	2,340 ft/713 m	Etowah, Tennessee	35.273962, -84.508912	

== Natural information ==
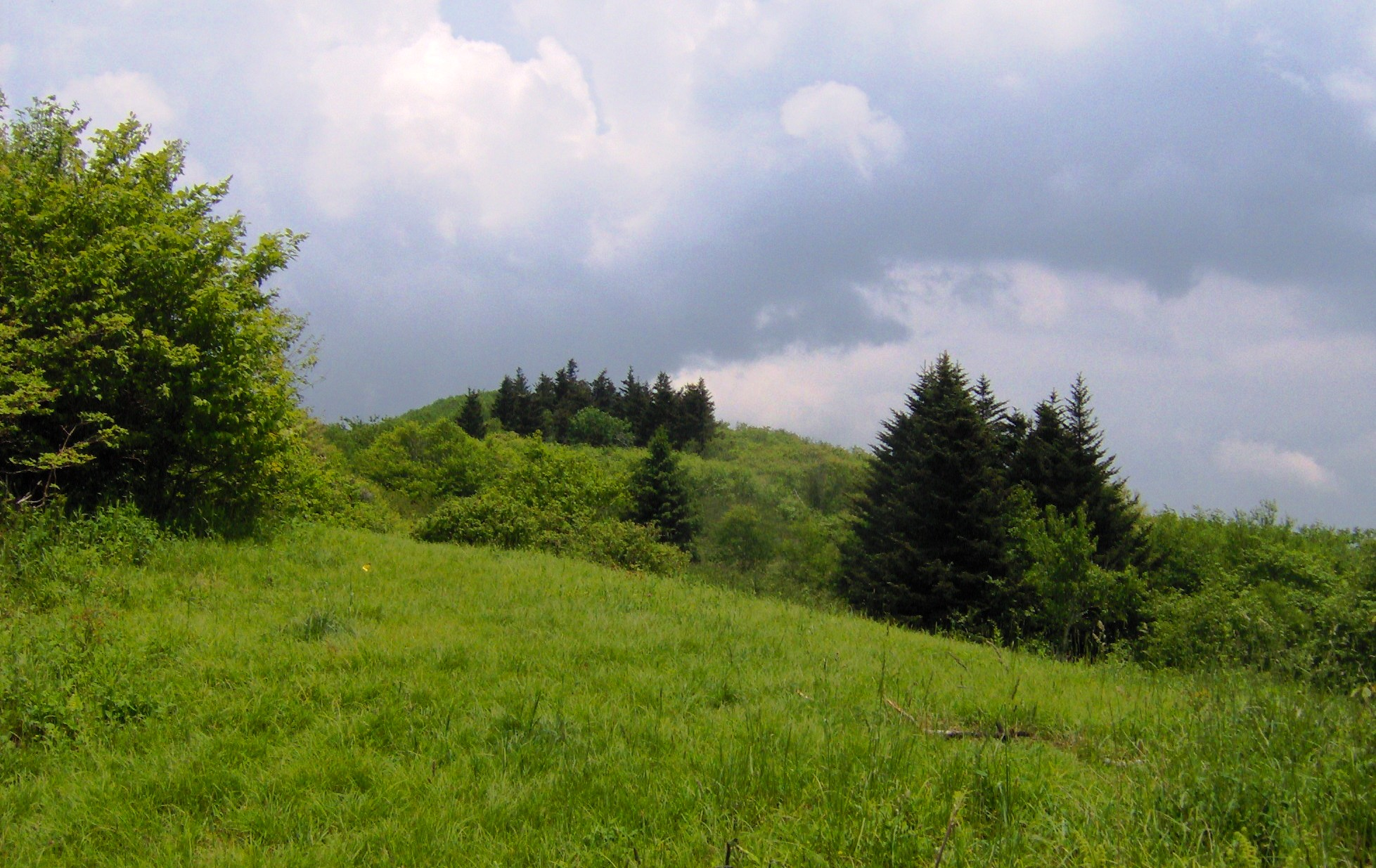
Bob Stratton Bald, where the family of Robert Stratton lived in the mid-1800s

The Unicoi Mountains consist chiefly of Precambrian metasedimentary rocks of a type known as the Ocoee Supergroup, formed over a billion years ago from ancient ocean deposits. Quaternary Period rocks are sometimes found in alluvial areas along streambeds. The Unicoi Mountains were formed roughly 250 million years ago during the Alleghenian orogeny, when a continental collision thrust the rocks upward.

The Unicoi Mountains are coated by a primarily second-growth mixed hardwood and pine forest. Cove hardwood forests are typically found at the lower elevations along rivers and streams, and chiefly consist of yellow poplar, white oak, red oak, hemlock, and multiple other species. A mixed hardwood-pine forest covers the mountain slopes, and chiefly consists of white oak, red oak, hickory, table mountain pine, pitch pine, and shortleaf pine.

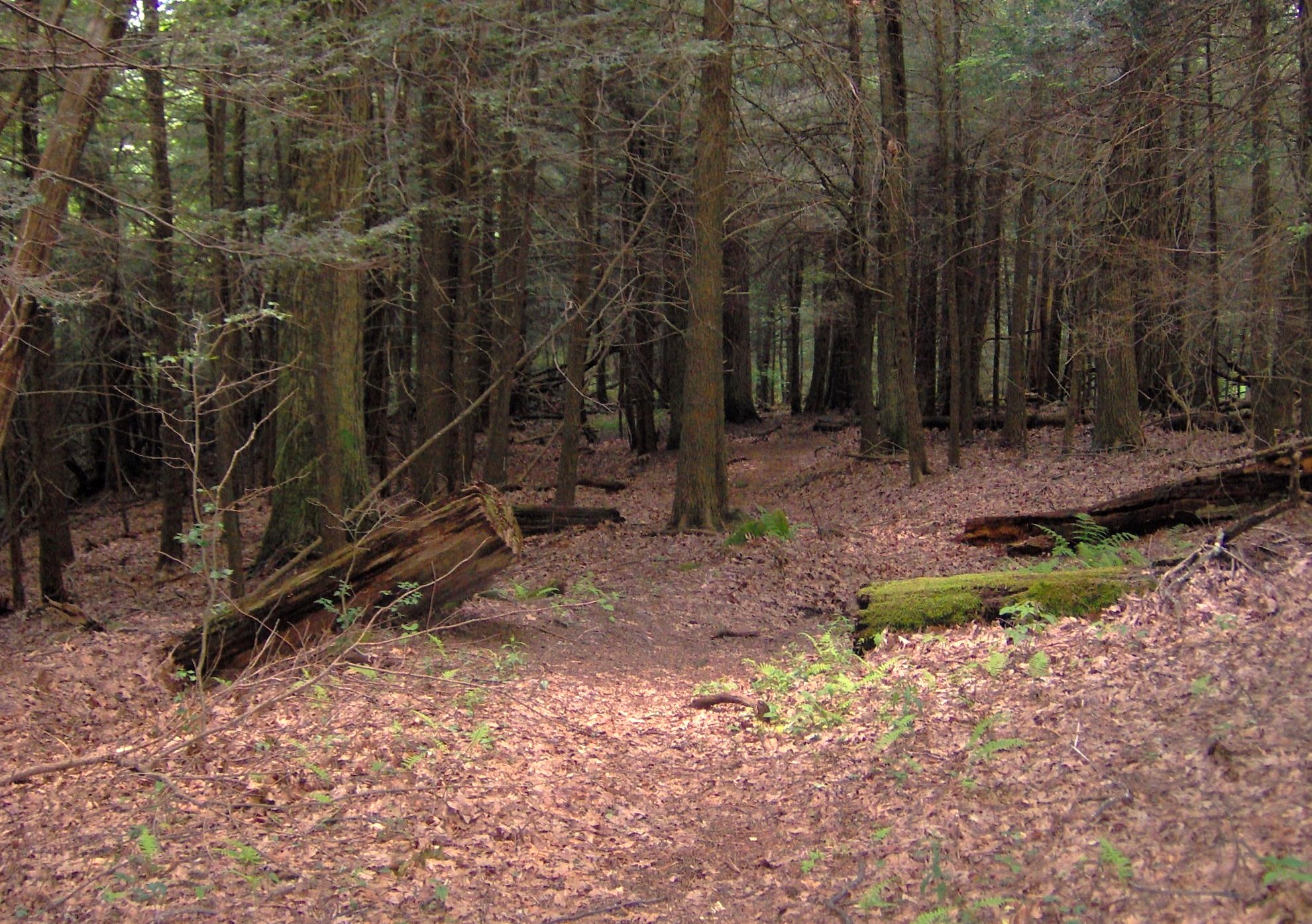
Mixed hardwood and pine forest in the Citico Creek Wilderness

While the vast majority of trees in the Unicoi Mountains are second-growth, the range is home to one of the few remaining stands of old-growth forest in the eastern United States. The Joyce Kilmer Memorial Forest along Little Santeetlah Creek is home to a substantial stand of virgin cove hardwood forest, and contains some of the oldest and tallest trees in the Unicoi Range. The largest trees in Joyce Kilmer are over 150 feet (46 m) tall and have circumferences of just over 20 feet (6.1 m). The oldest trees in the forest are over 400 years old. Other stands of old growth forest include a 187-acre (0.76 km^{2}) patch around Falls Branch Falls and a remote section of the Citico Creek Wilderness near Glenn Gap.

The understories of the mountain slopes and ridgecrests are often covered by dense thickets of rhododendron and mountain laurel. These thickets are often called "hells" due to their general impassability. The most outstanding example of rhododendron-laurel thicket is Jeffrey Hell, located in the Citico Creek Wilderness. Grassy balds—a type of highland meadow consisting of fields of thick grass and sparse tree coverage—are not uncommon in the higher elevations. The summit of the highest mountain in the range—Huckleberry Knob—is a grassy bald. Other grassy balds include Oak Knob (a subpeak of Huckleberry), Hooper Bald, and Bob Bald (a subpeak of Stratton).

== History ==
For centuries, Native Americans used a footpath in the southern Unicoi Mountains to travel from one side of the southern Appalachian range to the other. Known as the Wachesa Trail (after a later Cherokee who lived at its eastern terminus), the path stretched from modern Cowee to a halfway point near Beaverdam Creek and descended through Unicoi Gap to Great Tellico. Present-day Joe Brown Highway roughly follows the ancient trail.

By the time Euro-American explorers arrived in the region in the late 17th century and early 18th century, the Cherokee had established numerous villages in the outlying areas of the Unicoi Mountains. The Middle towns— located in the Robbinsville vicinity— included Tassetchee, Elijay, and Nequassee. The Overhill towns included Tallassee, Chilhowee, Citico, and numerous other villages in the Little Tennessee Valley at the range's northern extremes, Great Tellico along the Tellico River in modern Tellico Plains, and Great Hiwassee along the Hiwassee River at the western base of Starr Mountain. Excavations conducted at Citico (at the mouth of Citico Creek) revealed that it is a multiphase site, with periods of occupation stretching back thousands of years.

=== Early Euro-American history ===
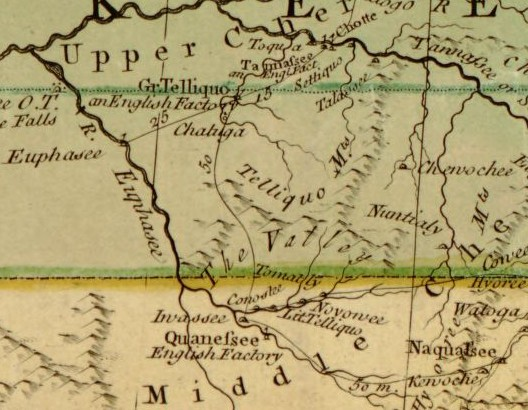
The Unicoi Mountain area (the "Telliquo Mountains") on John Mitchell's 1755 map of North America

16th-century Spanish explorers were the first Europeans to see the Unicoi Mountains. In 1540, the Hernando de Soto expedition passed just west of the mountains en route from the Chiaha villages in East Tennessee to the Coosa chiefdom in northern Georgia. In 1567, the Juan Pardo expedition visited the villages of "Chalahume" and "Satapo" (later Chilhowee and Citico) in the Little Tennessee Valley while attempting to find a route between Spanish settlements on the Atlantic coasts and Spanish settlements in Mexico.

While English explorers and traders were probably using the Wachesa Trail as early as the 1690s, the first documented crossing was that of Colonel George Chicken in 1725. Chicken, a South Carolina emissary travelling to the Overhill towns in hopes of obtaining their support in the colony's ongoing struggles with the Creek tribe, left Little Tellico in the Middle towns at 10am on July 24, 1725 and proceeded approximately 25 miles (40 km) across the southern Unicois to a campsite "about five Miles Short of a place called the Beaver Dam." Chicken's party departed at 5am the following morning and arrived at the village of Great Tellico at 3pm, having travelled another 25 miles (40 km).

In 1730, Sir Alexander Cuming, a flamboyant Scottish emissary, travelled from Charleston, South Carolina to the Overhill town of Tanasi in the lower Little Tennessee Valley in hopes of gaining the allegiance of the Cherokee for England (although Cuming's trip was part of an attempt to scam the people of Charleston). Cuming followed the same trail Chicken had taken five years earlier, departing from Tassetchee in the Middle towns and proceeding to a campsite "3 miles from Beaver Dam Creek." The following day, Cuming's party passed over "Ooneekawy Mountain" and proceeded another 12 miles (19 km) to Great Tellico.

=== 19th century ===
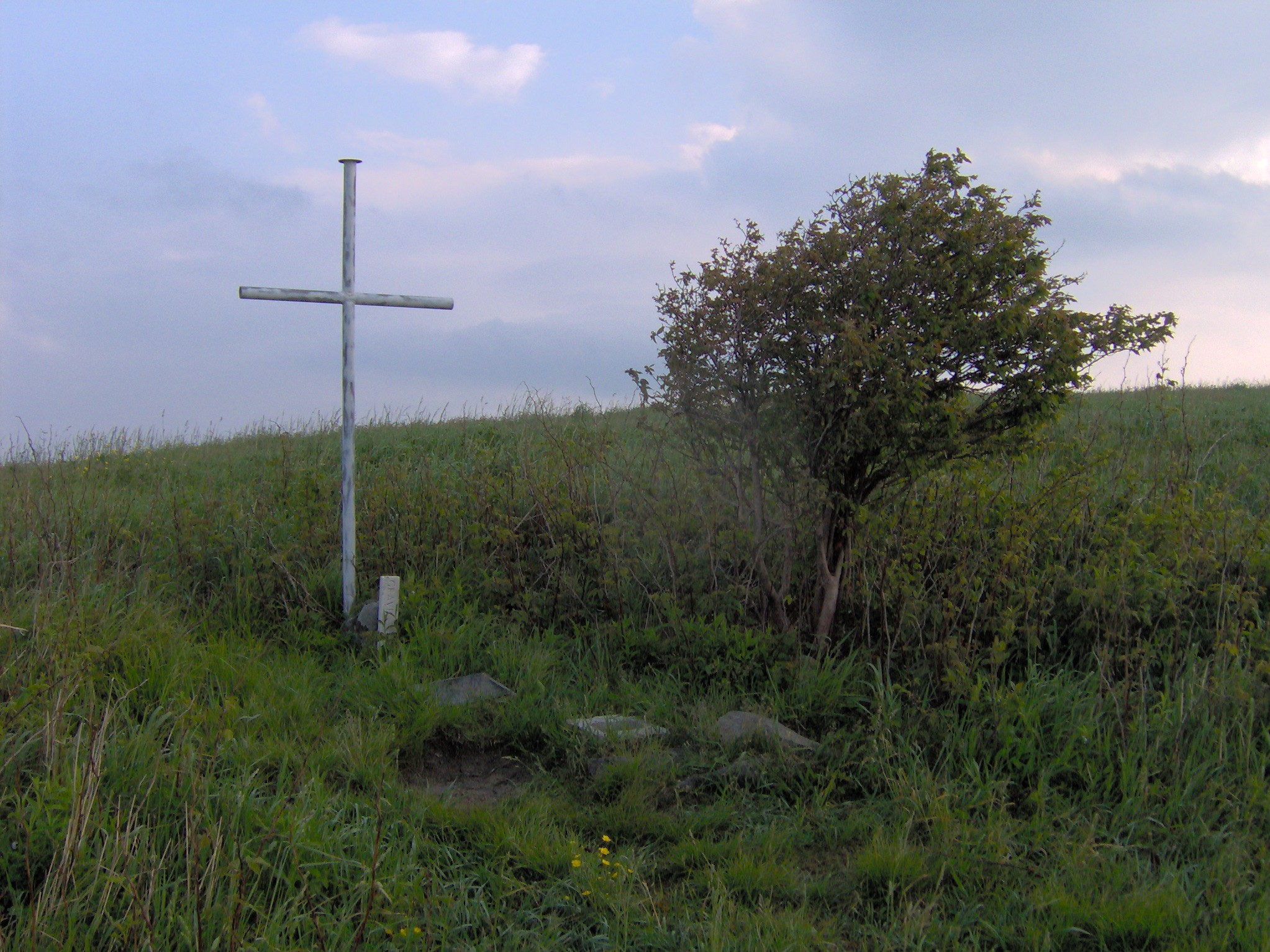
The grave of Andy Sherman— a logger who died crossing the Unicois in 1899— atop Huckleberry Knob

Although the Unicoi Turnpike— which closely followed the old Wachesa Trail— was completed in 1816, the Unicoi Mountains remained largely devoid of all but a few mountain families. The family of John Stratton (1799–1862) settled in the area now known as Stratton Meadows (atop the main crest near where Cherohala Skyway crosses the state line) in the 1830s. John's father, Absolum, died while visiting his son in 1852 and is thus buried at Stratton Meadows. John's son, Robert "Bob" Stratton (1825–1864) eventually moved a few miles north of Stratton Meadows to the mountain that now bears his name, Stratton Bald. Stratton lived just west of the mountain's summit in a meadow now known as "Bob Bald" until 1864, when he was ambushed and killed by bushwhackers at the height of the U.S. Civil War.

Sometime after the Civil War, the family of John and Albertine Denton moved to Little Santeetlah Creek, where they built a log cabin. According to family lore, the Dentons lived in a hewed-out giant chestnut tree log while they were building their cabin. The log had a diameter of over 6 feet (1.8 m) and housed the entire family of seven in two rooms. The Denton family remained in the area until around 1900. The cabin was dismantled by the Civilian Conservation Corps in the 1930s, and today only a chimney fall remains.

=== 20th century ===
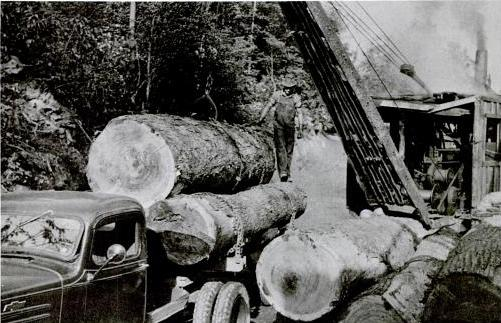
Logging operations in the Upper Tellico Valley in the 1930s

Around 1911, George Gordon Moore— an official for the Whiting Manufacturing Company— attempted to establish a boar hunting reserve atop Hooper Bald in the southeastern Unicois. The reserve consisted of a 500-acre (2.0 km^{2}) enclosed lot stocked with Russian blue boars imported from Europe. Most of the boars were able to escape from the lot, however, and fled to the remote slopes and stream bottoms. The introduced boars continue to thrive in the Appalachian environment to this day. The boars are considered a nuisance by forest officials due to the erosion damage they cause to the local watersheds. Moore attempted the same feat at his Rancho San Carlos in Carmel, California which had the same results of invasive wild boar escaping and devastating the local landscape.

In 1915, the Babcock Lumber Company began a massive logging operation in the northern Unicoi Mountains. The company logged nearly two-thirds of the Slickrock Creek watershed until 1922, when the construction of Calderwood Dam along the Little Tennessee River threatened to flood the railroad tracks leading into the area and forcing an end to the company's logging operations in what is now the Joyce-Kilmer Slickrock Wilderness. That same year, however, Babcock began logging the Citico Creek watershed on the Tennessee side of the mountains. This operation continued until 1925, when a massive forest fire destroyed the company's logging tramways and wiped out nearly half the forest. The company continued low-scale logging in the Doublecamp area until 1929. The logging practices of Babcock and other logging companies proved extremely detrimental to the forest environment of the Unicoi Mountains, and the U.S. Forest Service began buying up the land in the 1930s. The forest service's policy of letting natural processes heal the forest has allowed the forest to recover to a great extent.

In 1958, Sam Williams— a resident of Tellico Plains— led a well-publicized covered wagon train across the Unicoi Mountains to Murphy, North Carolina, which became an annual event to promote the construction of a highway linking the Tennessee and North Carolina side of the Unicois. The original path of the highway would follow the ancient path of the Wachesa Trail and Unicoi Turnpike, although organizers chose a more feasible route over the Unicoi crest to Robbinsville. The highway— named "Cherohala Skyway" (a fusion of "Cherokee" and "Nantahala")— was completed in 1996.

== Protected areas within the Unicoi Mountains ==
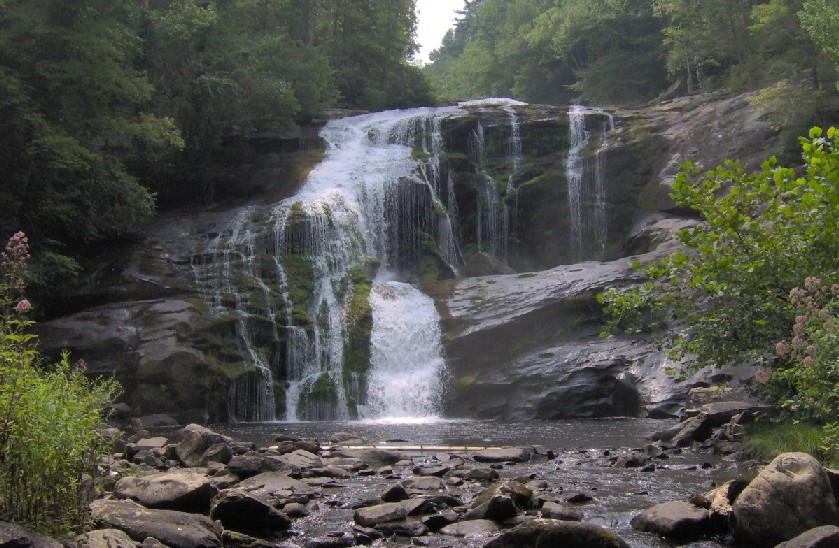
Bald River Falls

Along with the Cherokee National Forest and the Nantahala National Forest, several designated areas protect various parts of the Unicoi Mountains.

- The Joyce Kilmer-Slickrock Wilderness, designated as a wilderness area in 1975. It consists of 17,394 acres (70.39 km^{2}), 13,562 of which are located in North Carolina, with the rest lying just across the border in Tennessee. The Joyce Kilmer Memorial Forest consists of roughly 3,800 acres (15 km^{2}) of old growth hardwood forest along the Santeetlah Creek watershed. The forest's namesake, Joyce Kilmer, was a poet and journalist killed in World War I.
- The Citico Creek Wilderness, designated as a wilderness area in 1984, protects the upper watershed of Citico Creek and consists of 16,226 acres (65.66 km^{2}).
- The Bald River Gorge Wilderness, designated as a wilderness area in 1984, consists of 3,721 acres (15.06 km^{2}). It protects the Bald River and its immediate watershed.
- The Gee Creek Wilderness, designated as a wilderness area in 1975, consists of 2,493 acres (10.09 km^{2}). It protects the Gee Creek watershed on the eastern slopes of Starr Mountain.
- The Upper Tellico Off-Road Vehicle Area, purchased in 1980. The upper watershed of the Tellico River in the southeastern Unicois is criss-crossed by multiple old logging roads and paths popular with 4x4 enthusiasts. In 2009, the U.S. Forest Service announced a decision to permanently close the Tellico Off-Road Vehicle Area when studies showed that erosion along the trails was damaging valuable brook trout waters along the river.

== Photo gallery ==
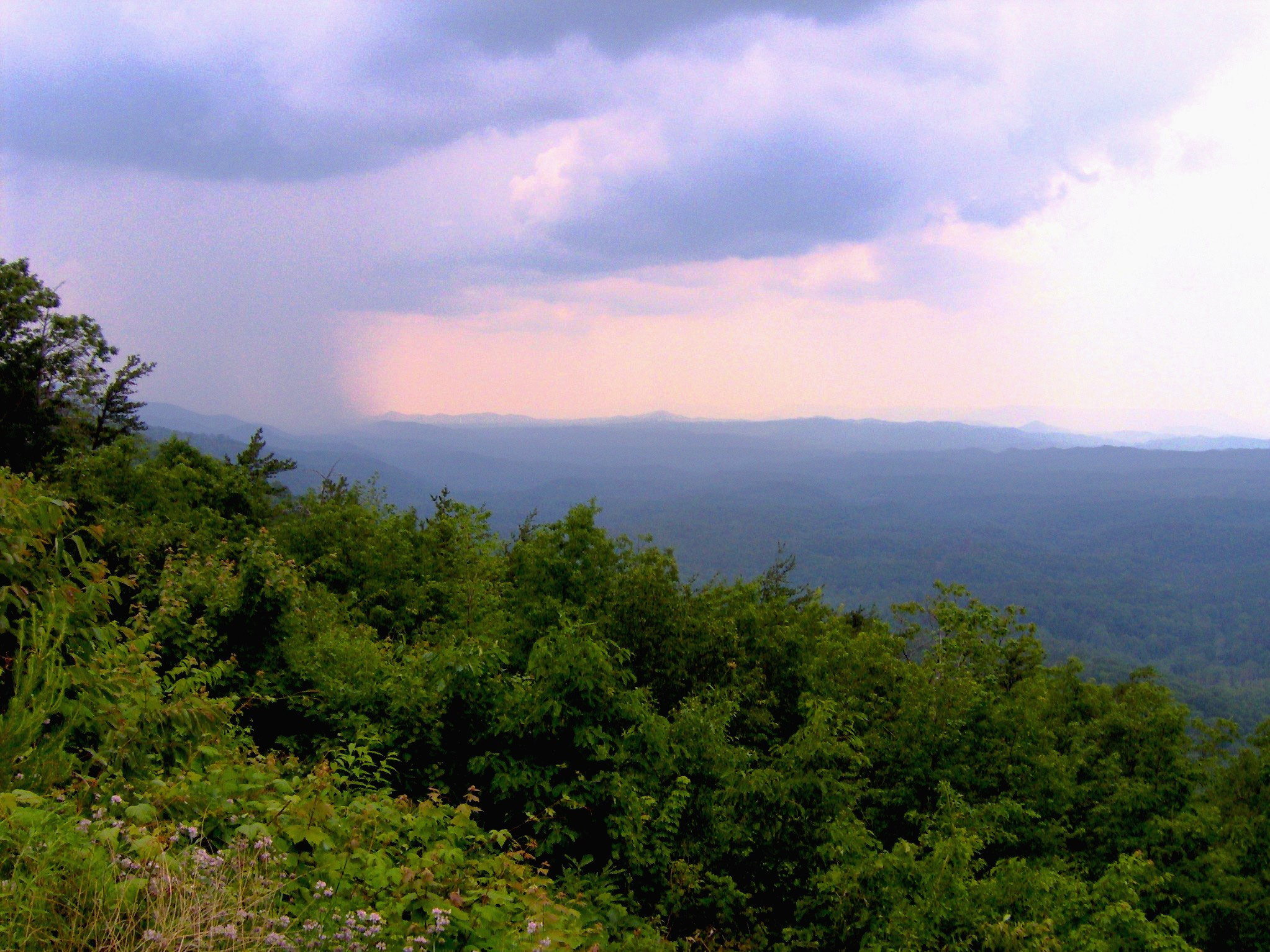
View from the Cherohala Skyway on the slopes of Hemlock Knob, looking southeast.

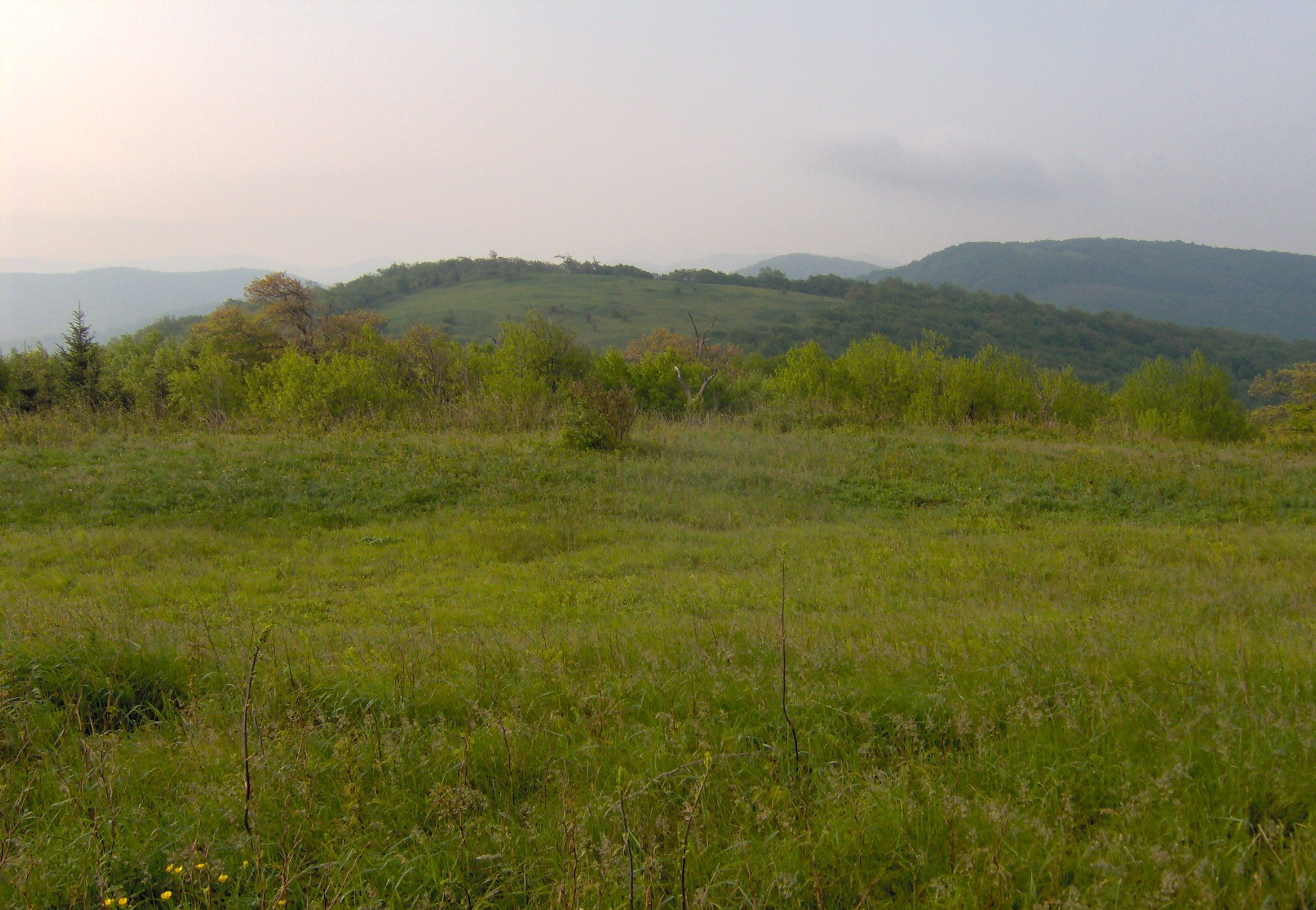
View from Huckleberry Knob, looking south

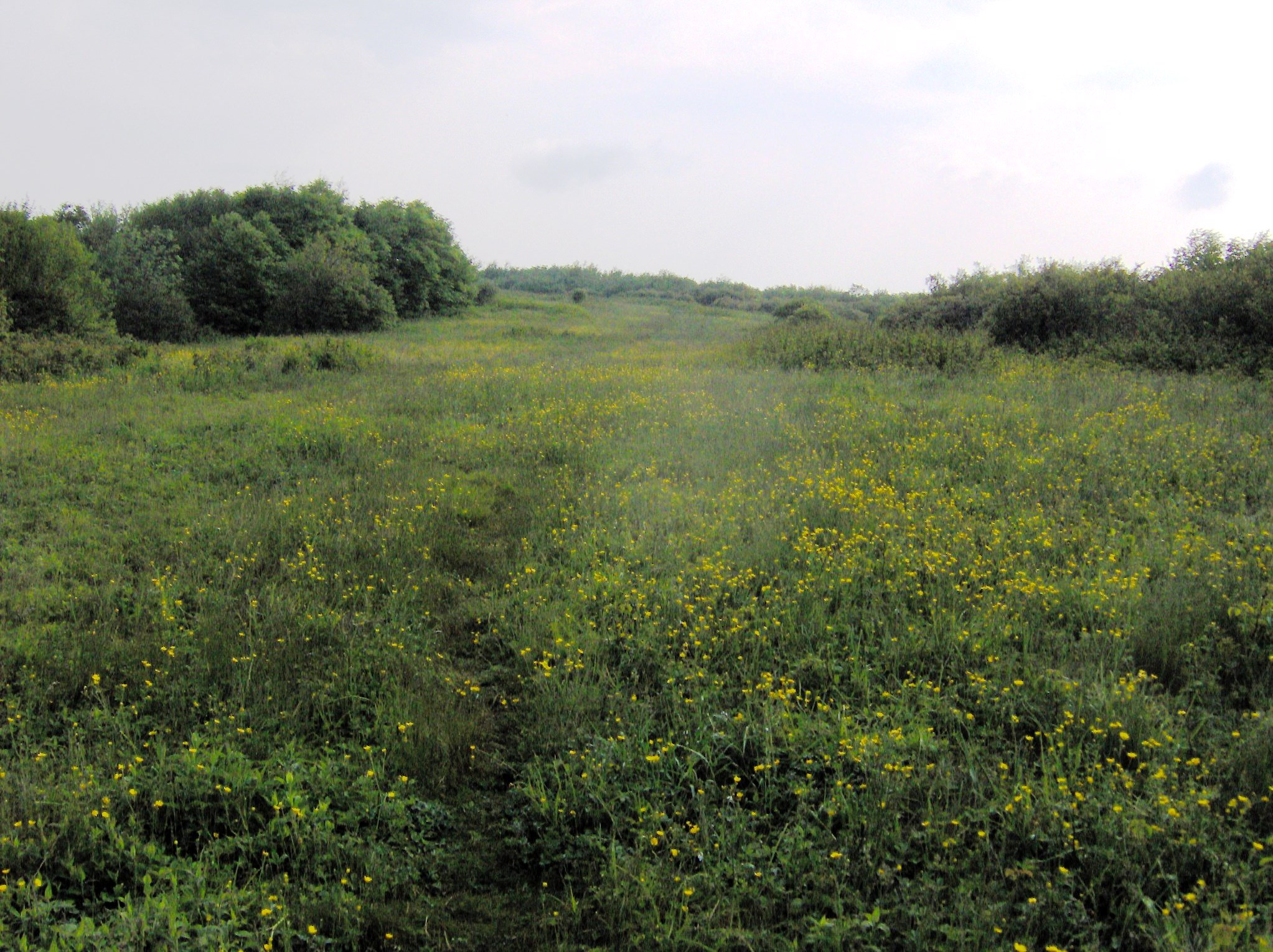
Hooper Bald

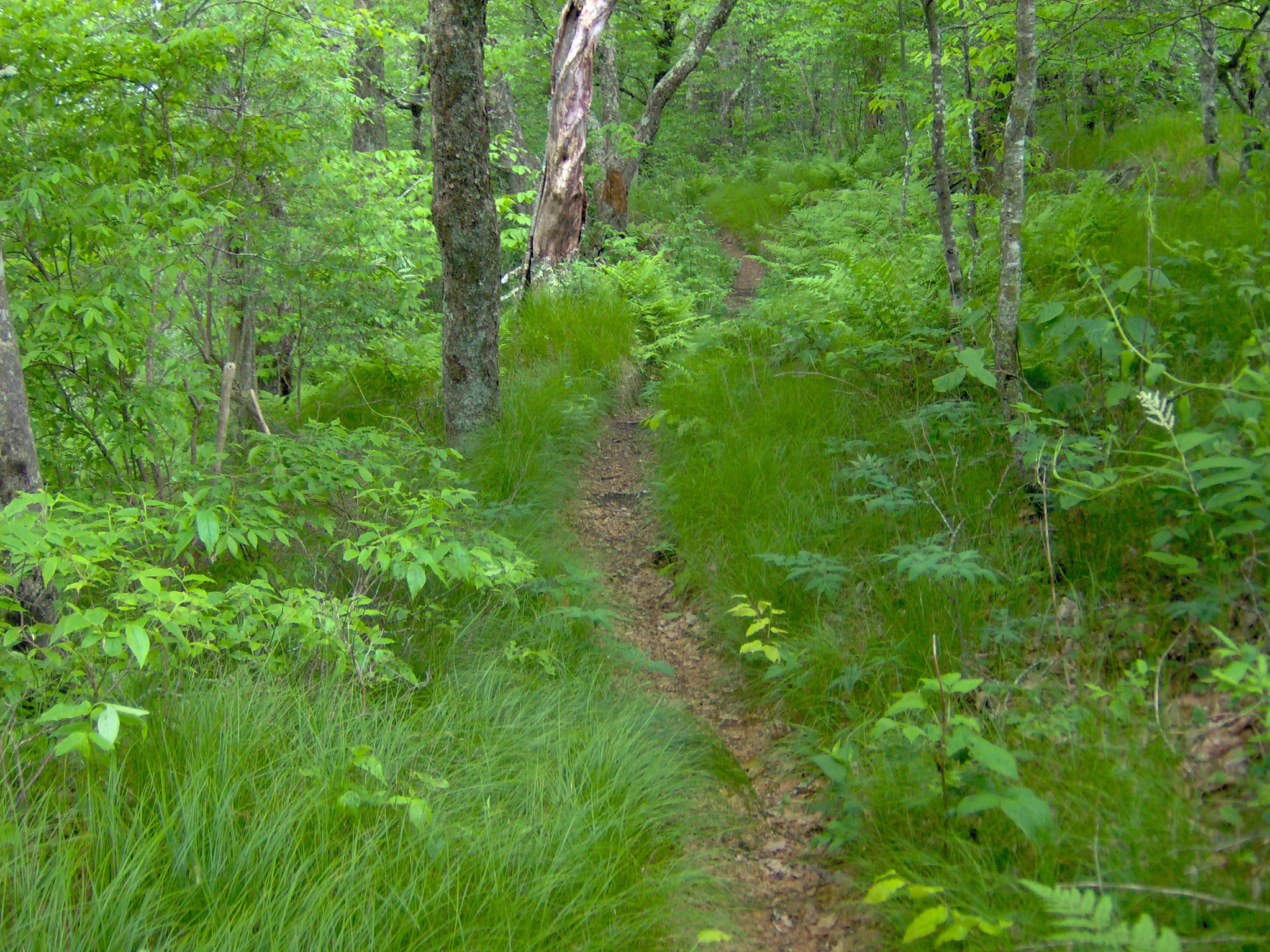
The Stratton Bald Trail (#54) approaching Stratton's summit

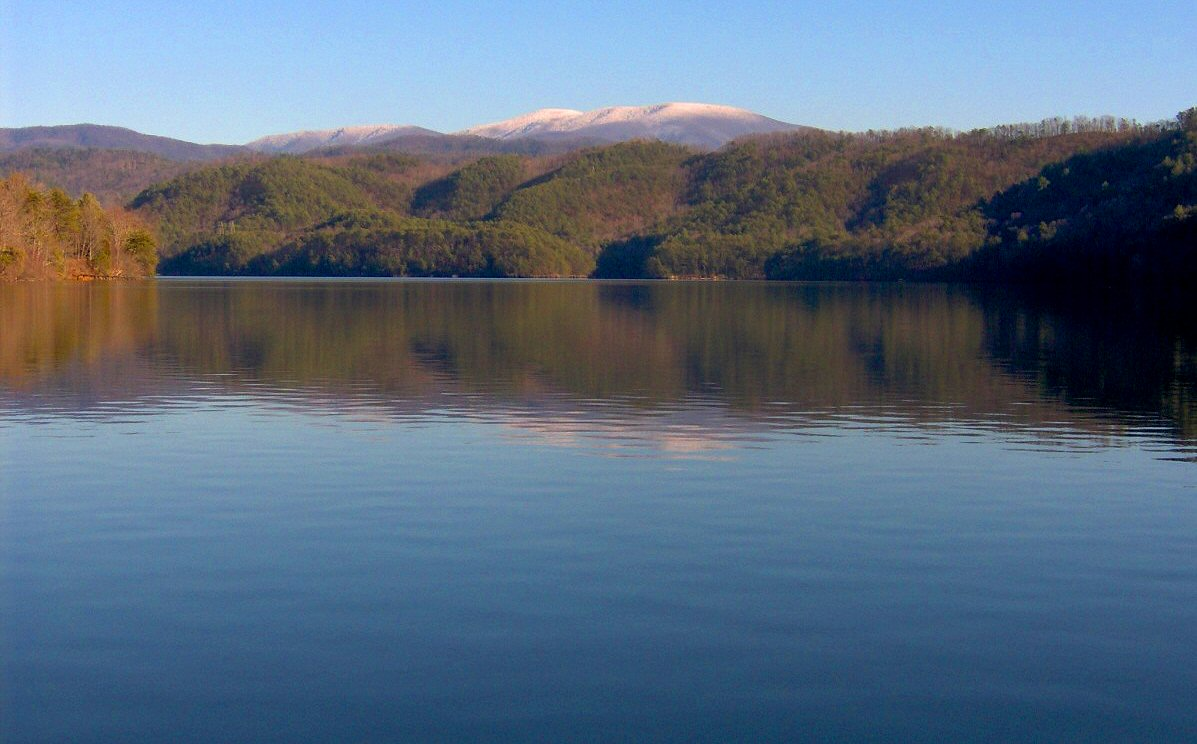
Salt Spring Mountain, viewed from US-129

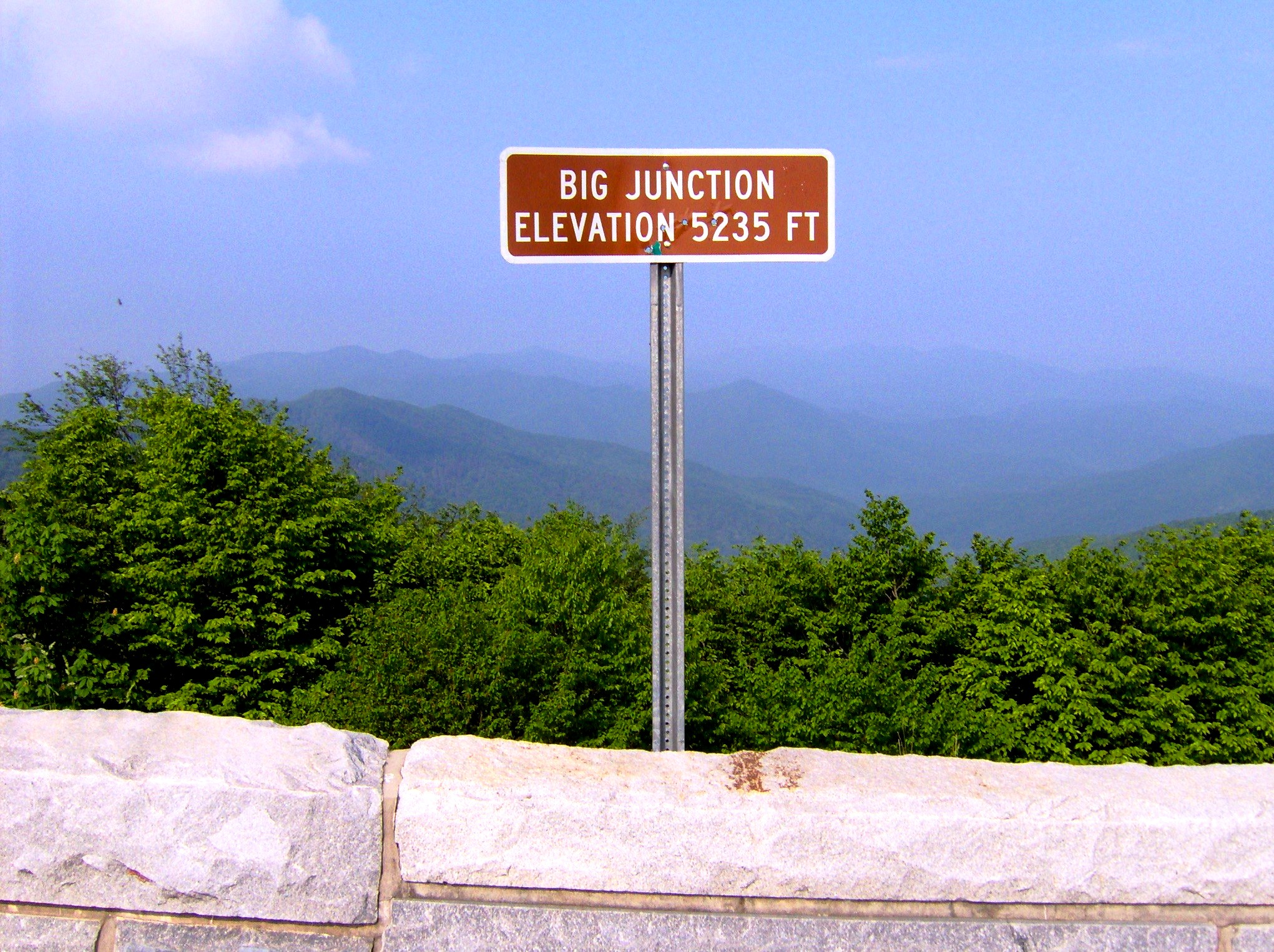
The Big Junction Overlook, near the summit of Big Junction

== See also ==
- Unaka Range

== Resources ==
- Duncan, Barbara R. and Riggs, Brett H. Cherokee Heritage Trails Guidebook. University of North Carolina Press: Chapel Hill (2003). ISBN 0-8078-5457-3
