= Oswald Dome =

Mountain in Polk County, Tennessee, US

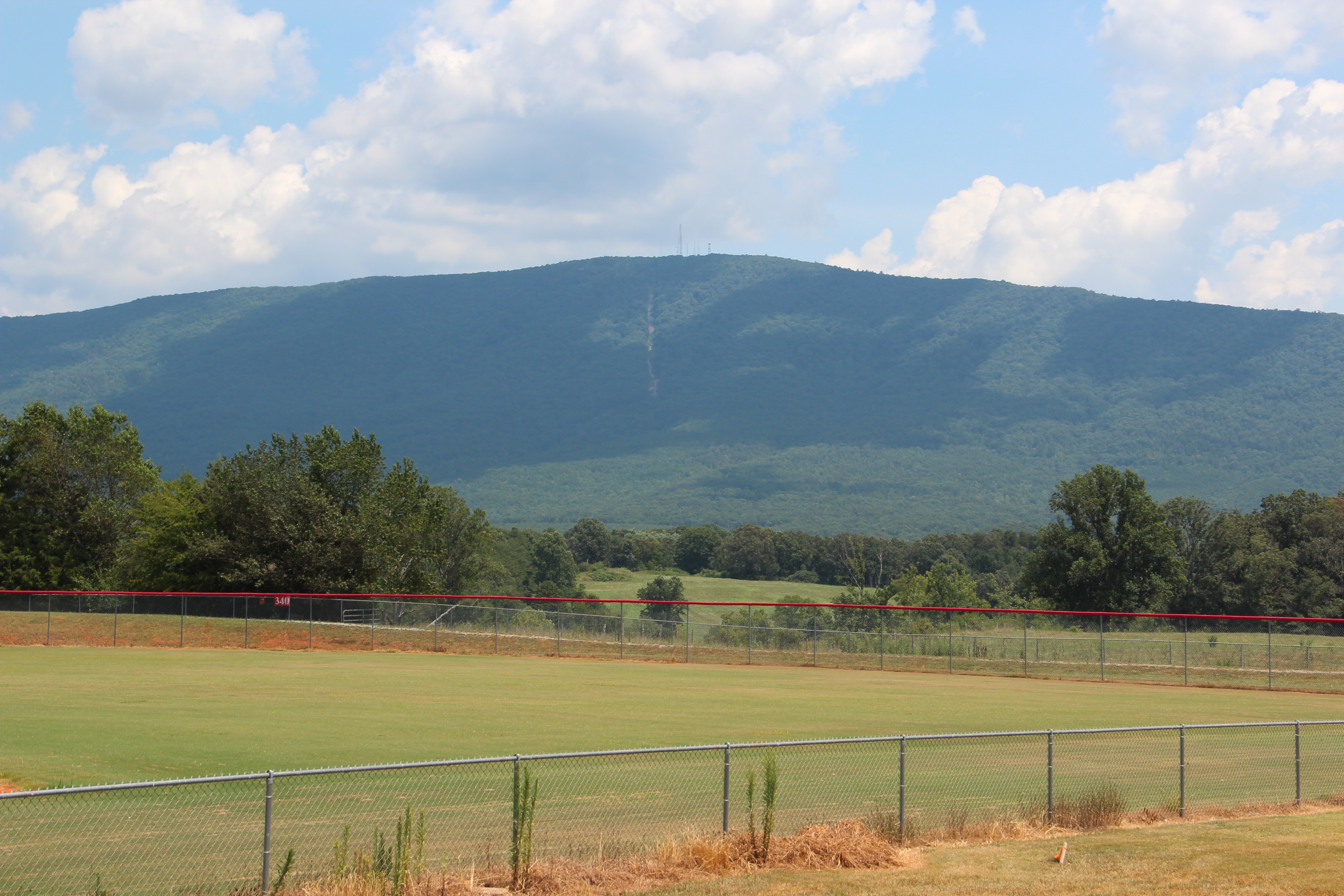
- Oswald Dome, viewed from Polk County High School

Highest point
- Elevation: 3,022 ft (921 m)
- Coordinates: 35°11′32″N 84°33′30″W

Geography
- Location within Tennessee
- Location: Polk County, Tennessee, United States
- Parent range: Unicoi Mountains
- Topo map: United States Geological Survey

Oswald Dome (elevation 3,022 feet (921 m)), also known as Bean Mountain, is a mountain located in the Cherokee National Forest in Polk County, Tennessee. It is part of the Blue Ridge Mountains, which is part of the larger Appalachian Mountains.

== Description ==
Oswald Dome is located on the western fringe of the Blue Ridge province of the Appalachian Mountains, and is sometimes considered part of the Unicoi Mountains, a subrange of the Blue Ridge Mountains. It is approximately 3.2 miles (5.1 km) west of Reliance, 5.5 miles (8.9 km) northeast of Benton, and 2.9 miles (4.7 km) south-southeast of Delano. The Hiwassee River flows along the north base, and a saddle separates the mountain from Chilhowee Mountain to the south, although both mountains are technically part of the same ridge. The Ridge-and Valley province is directly below the mountain to the west. The mountain is accessible by Oswald Dome Road, a forest service road which connects to U.S. 64, and two trails. The Lowry Cove Trail begins on top of the mountain and heads north. Several radio/television transmitters are located atop the mountain. A fire tower was moved from the mountain to the Ocoee Whitewater Center in 2004.

== Towers ==
- WPDP-CD (Cleveland)
- WWRO (Benton)
- WCPH (Etowah)
- WMCC-LP (Etowah)
