= Joyce Kilmer-Slickrock Wilderness =

Wilderness area in the United States

- IUCN category Ib (wilderness area)
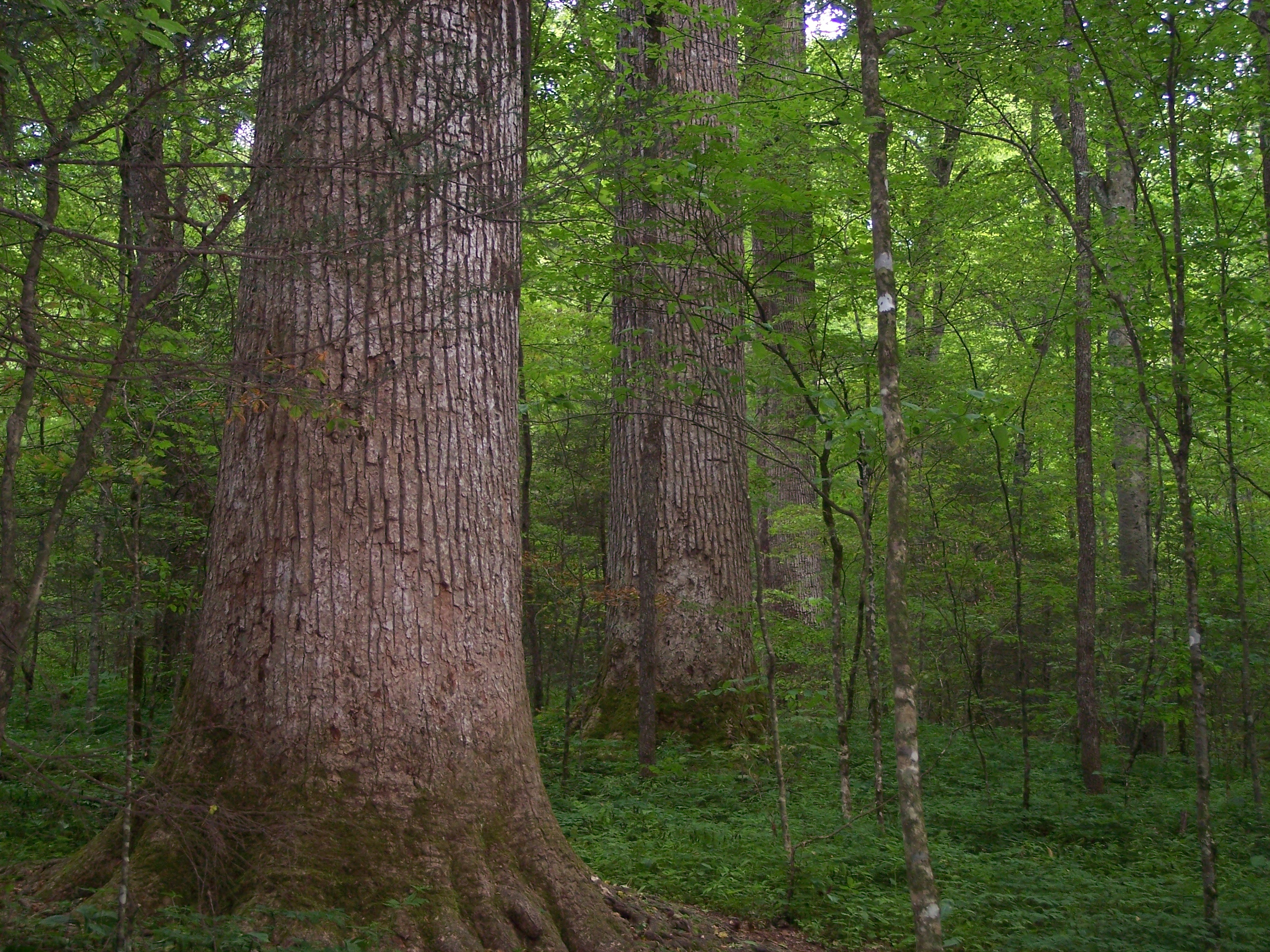
- Ancient tulip poplar trees in the Wilderness Area.

- Location within the United States
- Location: Graham County, North Carolina and Monroe County, Tennessee, USA
- Nearest city: Tapoco, North Carolina
- Coordinates: 35°22′25″N 83°58′32″W
- Area: 17,394 acres (70 km^{2})
- Established: 1975
- Governing body: U.S. Forest Service

Joyce Kilmer-Slickrock Wilderness, created in 1975, covers 19,246 acres (78 km^{2}) in the Nantahala National Forest in western North Carolina and the Cherokee National Forest in East Tennessee, in the watersheds of the Slickrock and Little Santeetlah Creeks. It is named after Joyce Kilmer, author of the poem "Trees". The Little Santeetlah and Slickrock watersheds contain 5,926 acres (23.98 km^{2}) of old-growth forest, one of the largest tracts in the Eastern United States.

The Babcock Lumber Company logged roughly two-thirds of the Slickrock Creek watershed before the construction of Calderwood Dam in 1922 flooded the company's railroad access and put an end to logging operations in the area. In the 1930s, the Veterans of Foreign Wars asked the U.S. Forest Service to create a memorial forest for Kilmer, a poet and journalist who had been killed in World War I. After considering millions of acres of forest land throughout the U.S., the Forest Service chose an undisturbed 3,800-acre (15 km^{2}) patch along Little Santeetlah Creek, which it dedicated as the Joyce Kilmer Memorial Forest in 1936.

The sources of both Slickrock Creek and Little Santeetlah Creek are located high in the Unicoi Mountains, on opposite slopes of Bob Stratton Bald, a 5,360-foot (1,630 m) grassy bald overlooking the southwest corner of the Joyce Kilmer-Slickrock Wilderness. Slickrock Creek rises on Stratton's northwestern slope and flows northeastward to its mouth along the Little Tennessee River. Little Santeetlah rises on Stratton's southeastern slope and flows southeastward to its mouth along Santeetlah Creek.

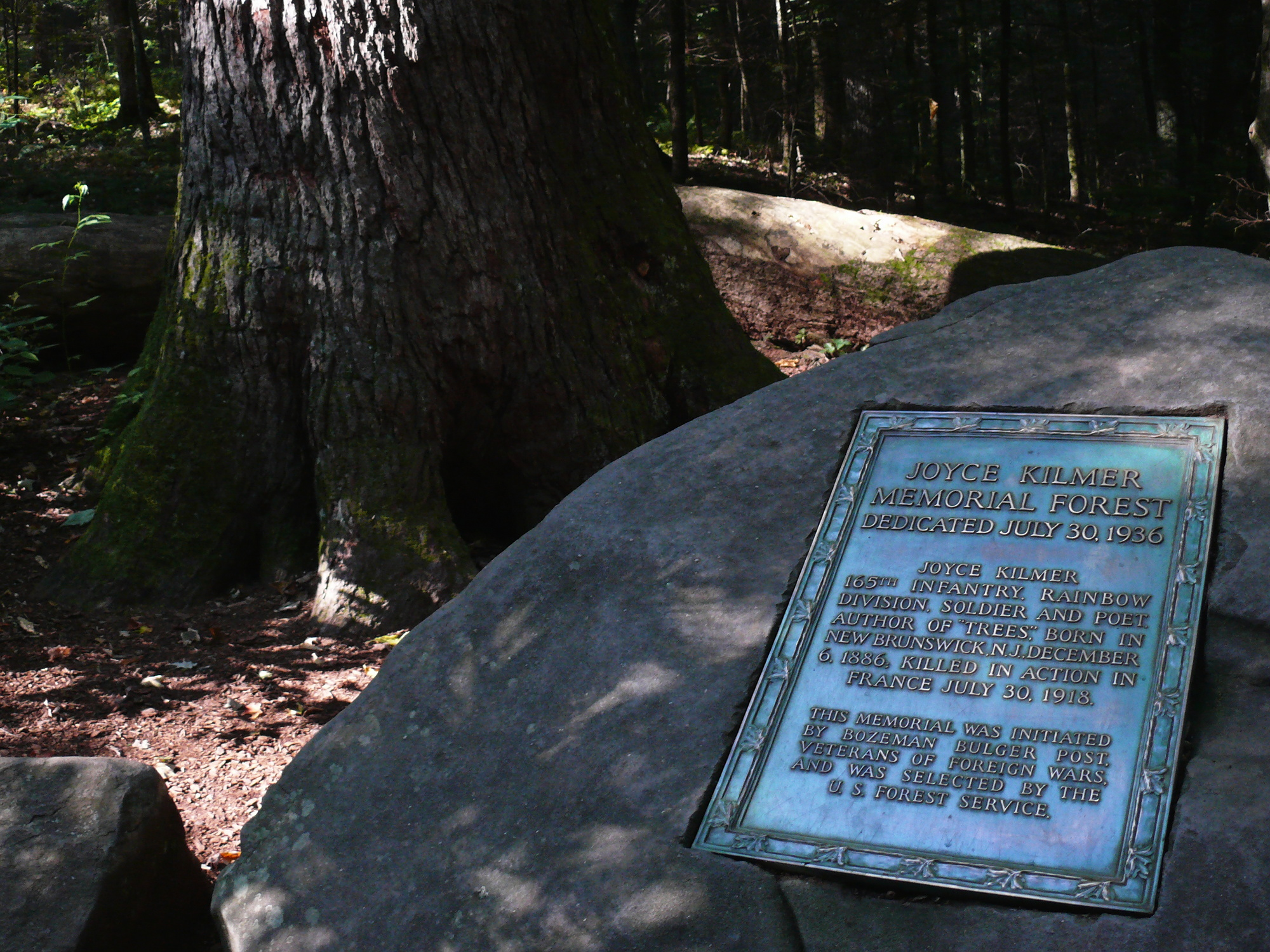
Joyce Kilmer Memorial

The Joyce Kilmer Memorial Forest along Little Santeetlah Creek is a rare example of an old-growth cove hardwood forest, an extremely diverse forest type unique to the Appalachian Mountains. Although there are many types of trees in Joyce Kilmer, dominant species include tulip poplar, eastern hemlock, red and white oak, American basswood, American beech, and American sycamore. Many of the trees in Joyce Kilmer are over 400 years old. The largest rise to heights of over 100 feet (30 m) and have circumferences of up to 20 feet (6.1 m). The Slickrock Creek basin is covered primarily by mature second-growth cove hardwood forest, although a substantial old growth stand exists in its upper watershed.

The Joyce Kilmer-Slickrock Wilderness borders the Citico Creek Wilderness, which lies within the Cherokee National Forest in Tennessee.

== See also ==
- List of U.S. Wilderness Areas
- List of old-growth forests
- Wilderness Act
