= Appalachian balds =

Mountain type

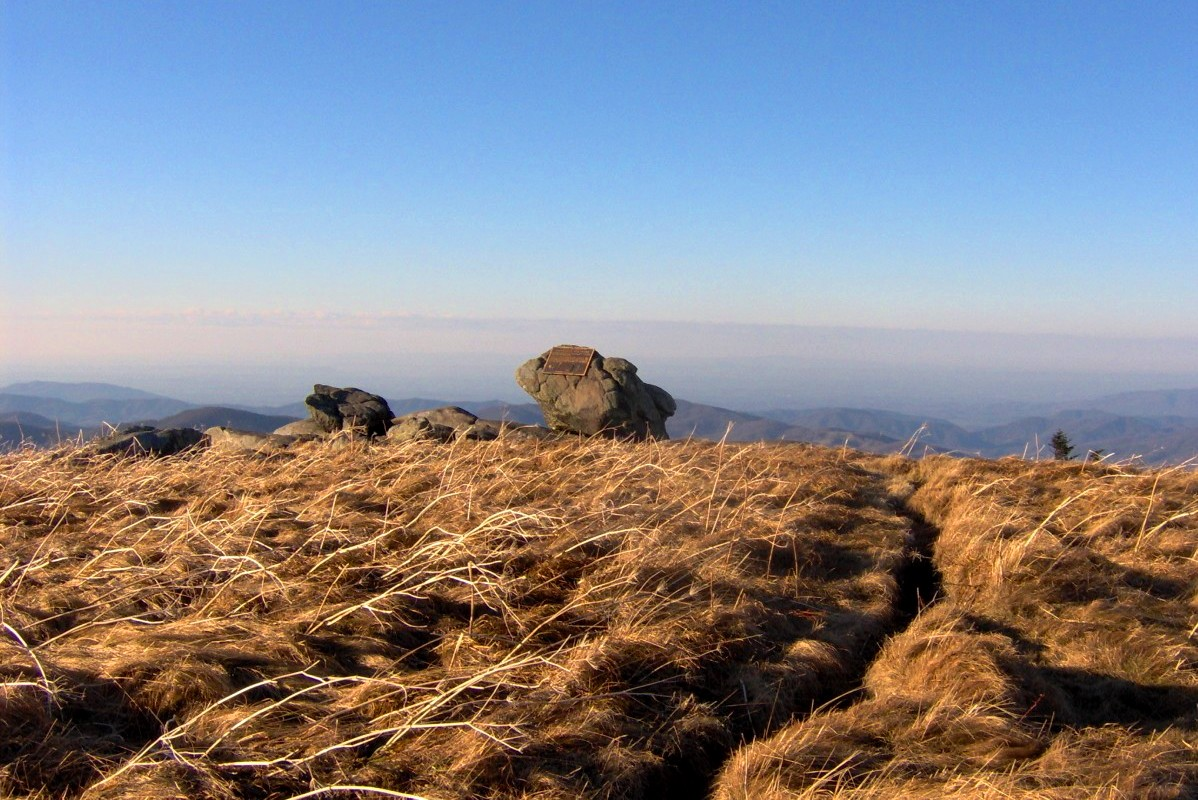
Grassy Ridge Bald in the Roan Highlands

In the Appalachian Mountains of the eastern United States, balds are mountain summits or crests covered primarily by thick vegetation of native grasses or shrubs occurring in areas where heavy forest growth would be expected.

Balds are found primarily in the Southern Appalachians, where, even at the highest elevations, the climate is too warm to support an alpine zone, areas where trees fail to grow due to short or non-existent growing seasons. The difference between an alpine summit, such as Mount Washington in New Hampshire, and a bald, such as Gregory Bald in the Great Smoky Mountains, is that a lack of trees is normal for the colder climate of the former but abnormal for the warmer climate of the latter. One example of southern balds' abnormality can be found at Roan Mountain, where Roan High Knob (el. 6,285 ft/1,915 m) is coated with a dense stand of spruce-fir forest, whereas an adjacent summit, Round Bald (el. 5,826 ft/1,776 m), is almost entirely devoid of trees. Why some summits are bald and some are not is a mystery, though there are several hypotheses.

Ecologists have described balds as both a scientific mystery as well as a conservational concern since their lack of developed trees is such a poorly understood phenomenon. There are many balds that have maintained long term persistence although the areas around them are heavily forested mountains. Ecologist R. H. Whittaker describes the Appalachian balds as unusual openings in an otherwise very typical and continuous forest which has small amounts of data collected about it. The data that has been collected shows that the composition of the soil and patterns of climate are not enough to account for a lack of trees growing on the balds. This also raises concerns in terms of conservation for these balds since it isn't known what causes them to form or maintain themselves.

== Types ==
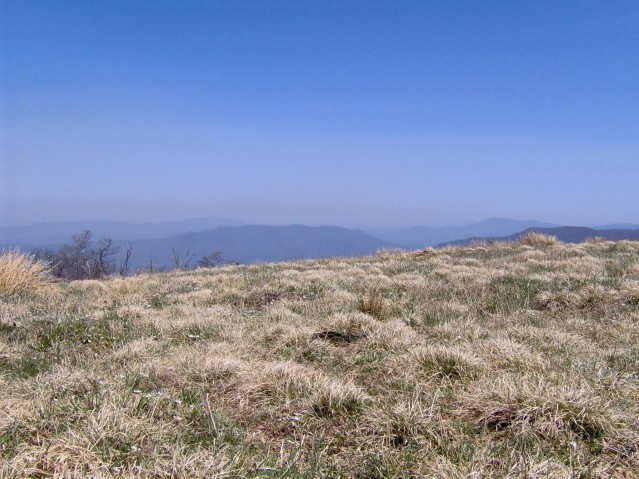
Clear vistas make grassy balds attractive to hikers

Two types of balds are found in the Appalachians:

=== Grassy balds ===
Grassy balds are relatively blunt summits covered by a dense sward of native grasses. Two types have been identified: those completely covered by grasses and those with a scattered overstory of mixed hardwoods with a grassy herbaceous layer. Grassy balds are normally found at the summit of hills, but can also be found on broad upper slopes.

Species found here include mountain oat-grass (Danthonia compressa), sedges (Carex brunnescens ssp. sphaerostachya, Carex debilis var. rudgei, Carex pensylvanica), and forbs such as three-toothed cinquefoil (Sibbaldiopsis tridentata) and Blue Ridge St. Johns-wort (Hypericum mitchellianum).

=== Heath balds ===
Heath balds are typically found along narrow ridges and mountain crests, and consist of dense evergreen shrubs. While the formation of grassy balds is a mystery, heath balds are often located in areas where the soil experiences heavy drainage or is highly acidic, which would complicate the growth of large wooded plants.

Four general types of vegetation are found on heath balds:

- Evergreen shrublands of Catawba rhododendron (Rhododendron catawbiense)
- Mixed shrublands of Catawba rhododendron, mountain-laurel (Kalmia latifolia), and black huckleberry (Gaylussacia baccata)
- Deciduous shrublands of American mountain-ash (Sorbus americana), minniebush (Menziesia pilosa), and southern mountain-cranberry (Vaccinium erythrocarpum)
- Deciduous shrubland of smooth blackberry (Rubus canadensis)

== Ecology and Environmental Conditions ==
The Appalachian Balds have many factors that may stress new tree saplings due the high elevation and exposure to natural elements. Its openness results in the balds facing harsher conditions than the areas surrounding it. Any sapling that lands on the Bald is subject to strong winds, recurring frost, and seasonal droughts that reduce the chances of a sapling from successfully surviving and growing. Winds and constant sun exposure reduce the chances of a sapling properly latching to the topsoil. The reoccurring frost creates frost and freeze- thaw cycles that lead to poor soil that is rocky and doesn't retain water well. Although these factors could stress trees from growing on the balds, they aren't unique to the balds.

The reason balds are such a mystery is because many of the environmental factors that reduce a trees chance of success are also prominent in much of the forested slopes that surround the Balds. These slopes are also exposed to the same factors as balds, but they still support stunted trees. If soil quality and climate were the reason for the formation of balds then much of the area surrounding the balds should also be devoid of life. However, this clearly isn't the case which suggests that there are additional factors influencing tree growth. Although environmental stress plays a role in the formation of balds, other ecological or historical factors likely play a role in creating and maintaining the Appalachian Balds.

== Origin and dynamics ==
The character and distribution of Appalachian Balds remained stable from the time the first naturalists explored the region until forestry regulations no longer permitted annual pasturing of local cattle. How and why a summit develops into a grassy bald is unknown; they represent "an ecological enigma and a conservation dilemma". There are many theories as to why the Appalachian Balds developed but the two most discussed are centered around whether it was natural or anthropogenic. Researchers have examined and proposed these theories through decades of ecological observations and data analysis to determine which is most likely to have occurred.

The natural theory proposes that the formation of the Appalachian Balds occurred naturally and without human influence. Weigl and Knowles note that "the presence of both rare, endemic plants and northern relicts requiring open habitat suggests a long evolutionary history" and offer a scenario in which grazing pressure of the giant herbivores of the Pleistocene retained the open tundra habitat as the Wisconsin glaciation retreated far to the north. Carbon isotope analysis of some soil from the Appalachian Balds also shows that the vegetation has consisted of woody and grassy plants for thousands of years. This evidence suggests that the Balds weren't solely caused by grazing animals but from natural and ecological factors since the varied vegetation predates the settlers.

The anthropogenic theory asserts that due to the arrival of paleoindians and the subsequent disappearance of the megaherbivores, grazing pressure was maintained by deer and elk, and then by the grazing animals of European settlers. Scientists have also done sedimentary analysis and have discovered multiple charcoal layers which may indicate that the natives burned the balds to maintain them. Further investigation of the soil around the Balds revealed that it had evidence of soil erosion that was consistent with human land disturbances. Studies in the southern Appalachians have shown that areas with a history of logging have poorer soil that is difficult for trees to thrive in. This leads to an increase in wind erosion in these areas that experienced logging as well as those around them like Balds. While there is some evidence that grassy balds have natural origins, the forest quickly started to reclaim the balds once large-scale livestock grazing was eliminated by the creation of national parks and national forests.

Researchers have long debated whether the Appalachian Balds were man-made or not, most modern studies recognize that both factors play roles in the creation and existence of the Balds. Instead, it is suggested that Balds originated though natural processes and climate but were then maintained and expanded on by human influence like grazing and burning. This mixing of origin is what shaped the conservation efforts for the Appalachian Balds. It informed the U.S Forest Service of what they need to do to maintain the Balds so the rare species that live there to continue thriving. Grassy balds such as Gregory Bald and Andrews Bald in the Great Smokies and the balds in the Roan Highlands are currently maintained as bald areas by the National Park Service and U.S. Forest Service.

The mountaintop meadows called the Southern Balds form a distinctive stretch for hikers of the Appalachian Trail.

== List of major Appalachian Balds ==
Mountain	Elevation	Range	State(s)	Surface
Richland Balsam	6,410 ft/1,950 m	Great Balsam Mtns.	N.C.	Grassy
Black Balsam Knob	6,214 ft/1,894 m	Great Balsam Mtns.	N.C.	Grassy
Grassy Ridge Bald	6,189 ft/1,886 m	Roan Highlands	N.C.	Grassy
Andrews Bald	5,920 ft/1,804 m	Great Smoky Mtns.	N.C.	Grassy
Round Bald	5,826 ft/1,775 m	Roan Highlands	Tenn./N.C.	Grassy
Jane Bald	5,820 ft/1,773 m	Roan Highlands	Tenn./N.C.	Heath/Grassy
Silers Bald	5,607 ft/1,709 m	Great Smoky Mtns.	Tenn./N.C.	Grassy/Young forest
Hump Mountain	5,587 ft/1,703 m	Roan Highlands	Tenn./N.C.	Grassy
Buck Bald	5,560 ft/1,609 m	Great Balsam Mtns.	N.C.	Grassy
Huckleberry Knob	5,560 ft/1,609 m	Unicoi Mtns.	N.C.	Grassy
Whitetop Mountain	5,540 ft/1,688 m	Grayson Highlands	Virginia	Grassy
Big Bald	5,516 ft/1,681 m	Bald Mtns.	Tenn./N.C.	Grassy
Thunderhead Mountain (middle summit)	5,485 ft/1,672 m	Great Smoky Mtns.	Tenn./N.C.	Heath
Hooper Bald	5,429 ft/1,655 m	Unicoi Mtns.	N.C.	Grassy
Yellow Mountain	5,420 ft/1,652 m	Roan Highlands	Tenn./N.C.	Grassy
Hemphill Bald	5,400 ft/1,646 m	Great Smoky Mtns.	N.C.	Grassy
Bob Stratton Bald	5,360 ft/1,634 m	Unicoi Mtns.	N.C.	Grassy
Wayah Bald	5,342 ft/1,628 m	Nantahala Mtns.	N.C.	Heath
Tusquitee Bald	5,240 ft/1,597 m	Nantahala Mtns.	N.C.	Grassy
Maddron Bald	5,200 ft/1,585 m	Great Smoky Mtns.	Tennessee	Heath
Siler Bald	5,200 ft/1,585 m	Nantahala Mtns.	N.C.	Grassy
Sandymush Bald	5,152 ft/1,507 m	Central Blue Ridge Mtns.	N.C.	Grassy
Cheoah Bald	5,062 ft/1,543 m	Cheoah Mtns.	N.C.	Grassy
Gregory Bald	4,949 ft/1,508 m	Great Smoky Mtns.	Tenn./N.C.	Grassy
Spence Field	4,920 ft/1,500 m	Great Smoky Mtns.	Tenn./N.C.	Grassy/Young forest
Brasstown Bald	4,784 ft/1,458 m	Southern Blue Ridge Mtns.	Georgia	Heath
Ben Parton Lookout	4,754 ft/1,449 m	Great Smoky Mtns.	Tennessee	Heath
Parson Bald	4,732 ft/1,442 m	Great Smoky Mtns.	Tenn./N.C.	Grassy
Rabun Bald	4,696 ft/1,431 m	Southern Blue Ridge Mtns.	Georgia	Heath
Max Patch Mountain	4,629 ft/1,411 m	Bald Mtns.	N.C.	Grassy
Russell Field	4,455 ft/1,358 m	Great Smoky Mtns.	Tenn./N.C.	Grassy/Young forest
Elk Garden	4,450 ft/1,356 m	Grayson Highlands	Virginia	Grassy
Beauty Spot	4,437 ft/1,352 m	Unaka Mtns.	Tenn./N.C.	Grassy
Big Bald Mountain	4,075 ft/1,242 m	Southern Blue Ridge Mtns.	Georgia	Grassy

== See also ==
- Appalachian bogs
- Cove (Appalachian Mountains)
- Southern Appalachian spruce-fir forest
- Sods
- Golets (geography)
