= Joyce Kilmer Memorial Forest =

Forest in Graham County, North Carolina, U.S.

- IUCN category Ib (wilderness area)
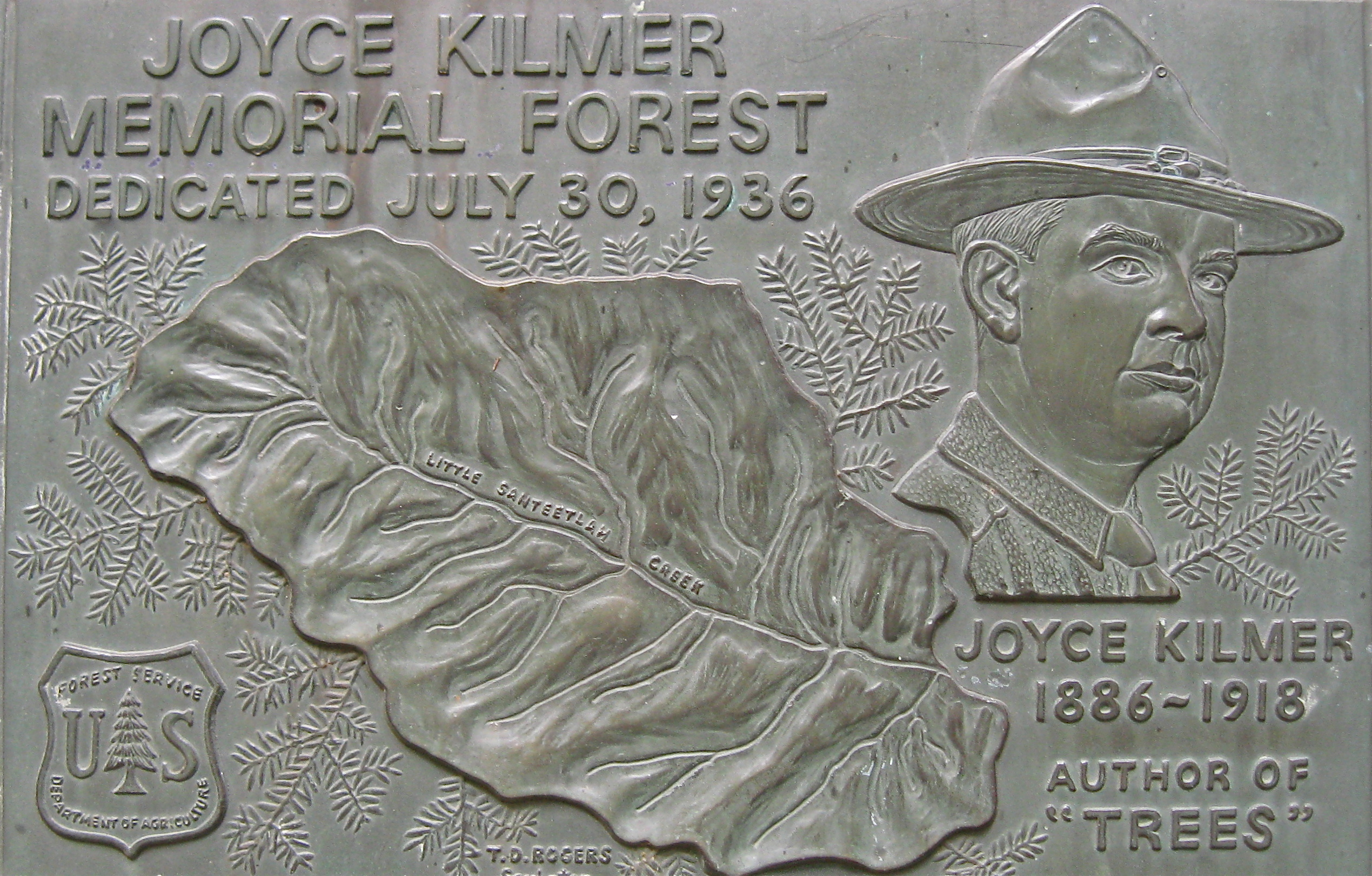

- Location within the United States
- Location: Graham County, North Carolina, USA
- Nearest city: Robbinsville, North Carolina
- Coordinates: 35°22′25″N 83°58′32″W
- Area: 3,800 acres (15 km^{2})
- Established: 1936
- Governing body: U.S. Forest Service

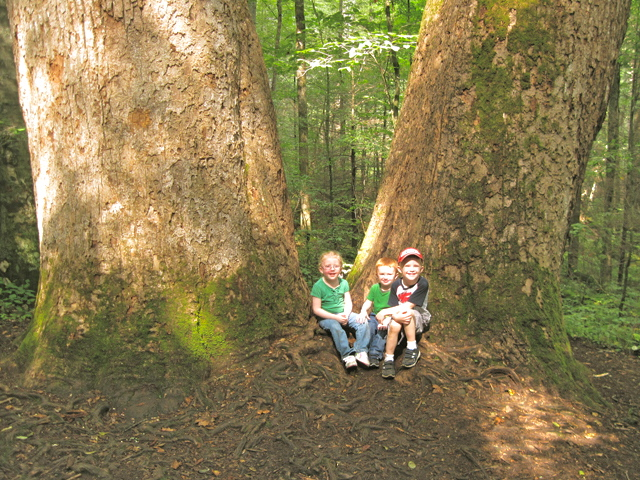
Children at the foot of giant tulip-poplars

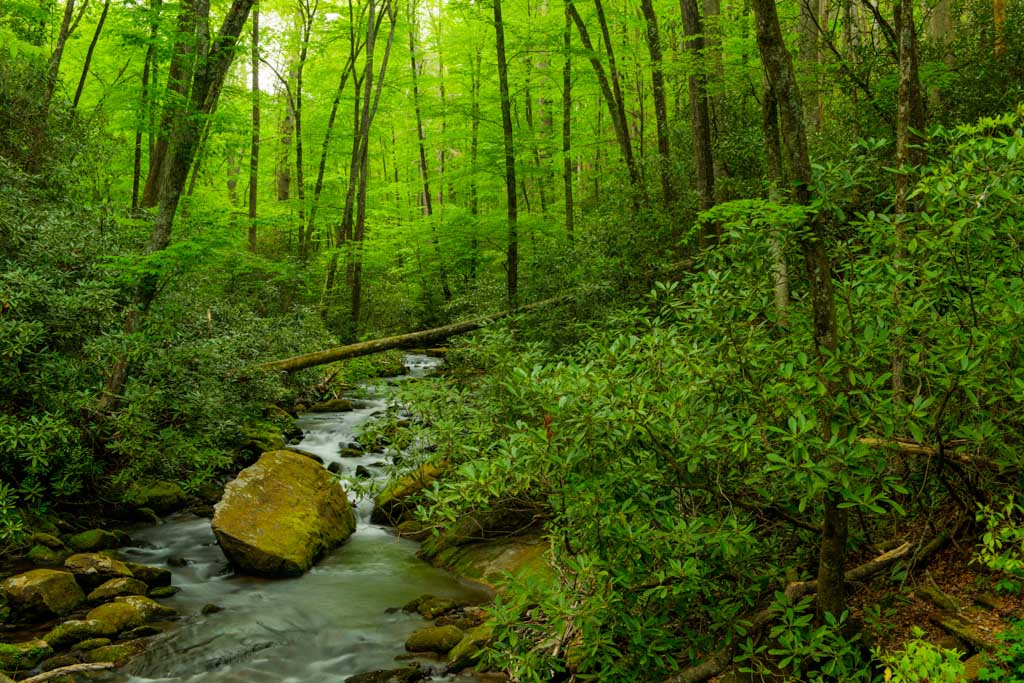
Joyce Kilmer Memorial Forest

Joyce Kilmer Memorial Forest is a 3,800-acre tract of publicly owned old-growth forest in Graham County, North Carolina, named in memory of poet Joyce Kilmer, best known for his poem "Trees". One of the largest contiguous tracts of old growth forest in the Eastern United States, the area is administered by the U. S. Forest Service. The forest features an easy two-mile, figure-eight trail that includes a memorial plaque at the juncture of the two loops. In 1975 the memorial forest was joined with a much larger tract of the Nantahala National Forest to become part of the Joyce Kilmer-Slickrock Wilderness.

== History ==
Beginning in 1915, the Babcock Lumber Company of Pittsburgh operated a standard gauge railroad in the area, logging out roughly two-thirds of the Slickrock Creek watershed before construction of Calderwood Dam threatened to flood the lower part of the railroad. A decline in the price of lumber during the Great Depression also encouraged preservation of the trees.

In 1934 the Bozeman Bulger Post (New York) of the Veterans of Foreign Wars petitioned "that the government of the United States examine its millions of forested acres and set aside a fitting area of trees to stand for all time as a living memorial" to Kilmer, a poet and journalist killed during World War I, whose 1913 poem "Trees" had become a popular favorite. After considering forests throughout the country, the Forest Service decided on an uncut 3,800-acre (15 km^{2}) area along Little Santeetlah Creek, which was dedicated as the Joyce Kilmer Memorial Forest on July 30, 1936.

== Importance ==
The memorial is a rare example of old growth cove hardwood forest, a diverse type unique to the Appalachian Mountains. Dominant species are yellow-poplar, oak, basswood, beech, and sycamore. Some trees are over 400 years old, and the oldest yellow-poplars are more than 20 feet (6.1 m) in circumference and stand 100 feet (30 m) tall.

Missing is the American chestnut, once the dominant tree of the forest, a victim of the chestnut blight accidentally introduced from Asia during the early 20th century. Although the last of the Kilmer chestnuts had probably died by the late 1930s, their wood is so rot-resistant that remnants of the massive logs and stumps are still visible. Another more recent loss is that of the giant eastern hemlocks from an infestation of an exotic insect, the hemlock woolly adelgid. Concerned that a falling limb or tree might injure a visitor, Forest Service managers decided to bring down dead trees near the memorial trail in a way they believed would mimic natural windthrow. In November 2010, the Forest Service blew up the trees with explosives, making the lower loop trail much lighter and drier, thereby changing the environment and creating a public relations challenge.

== Images ==
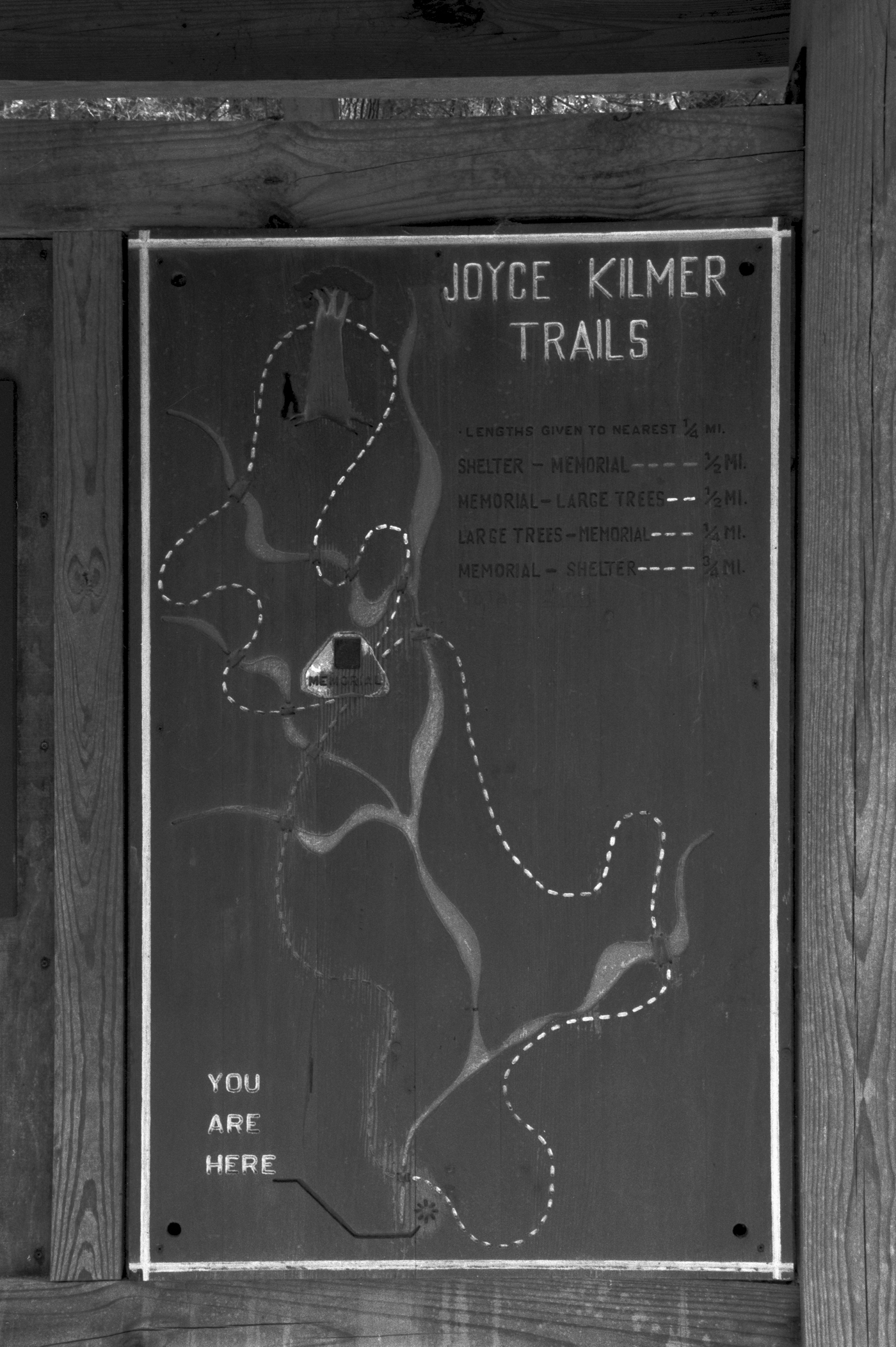
Trail map

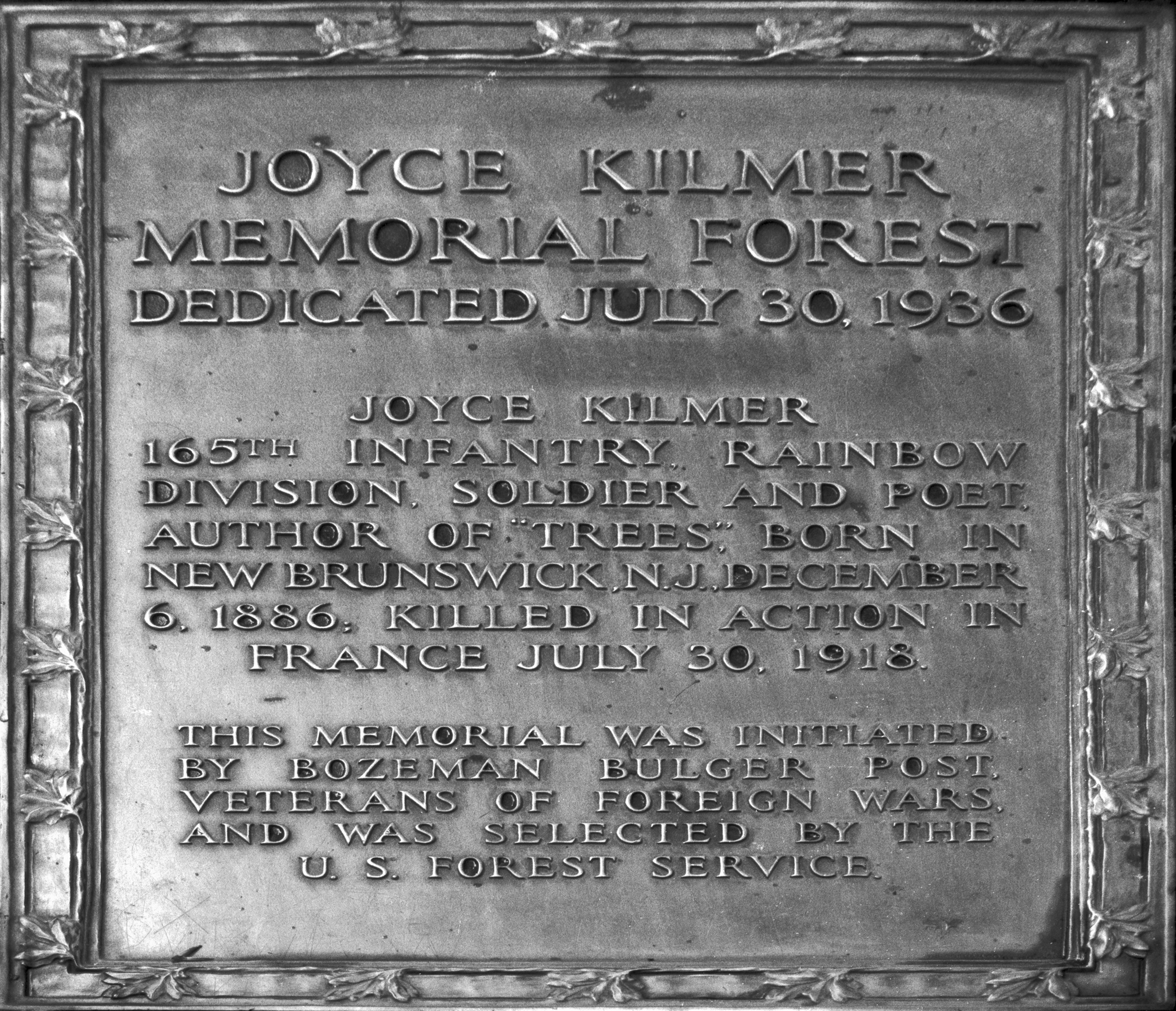
Dedication plaque

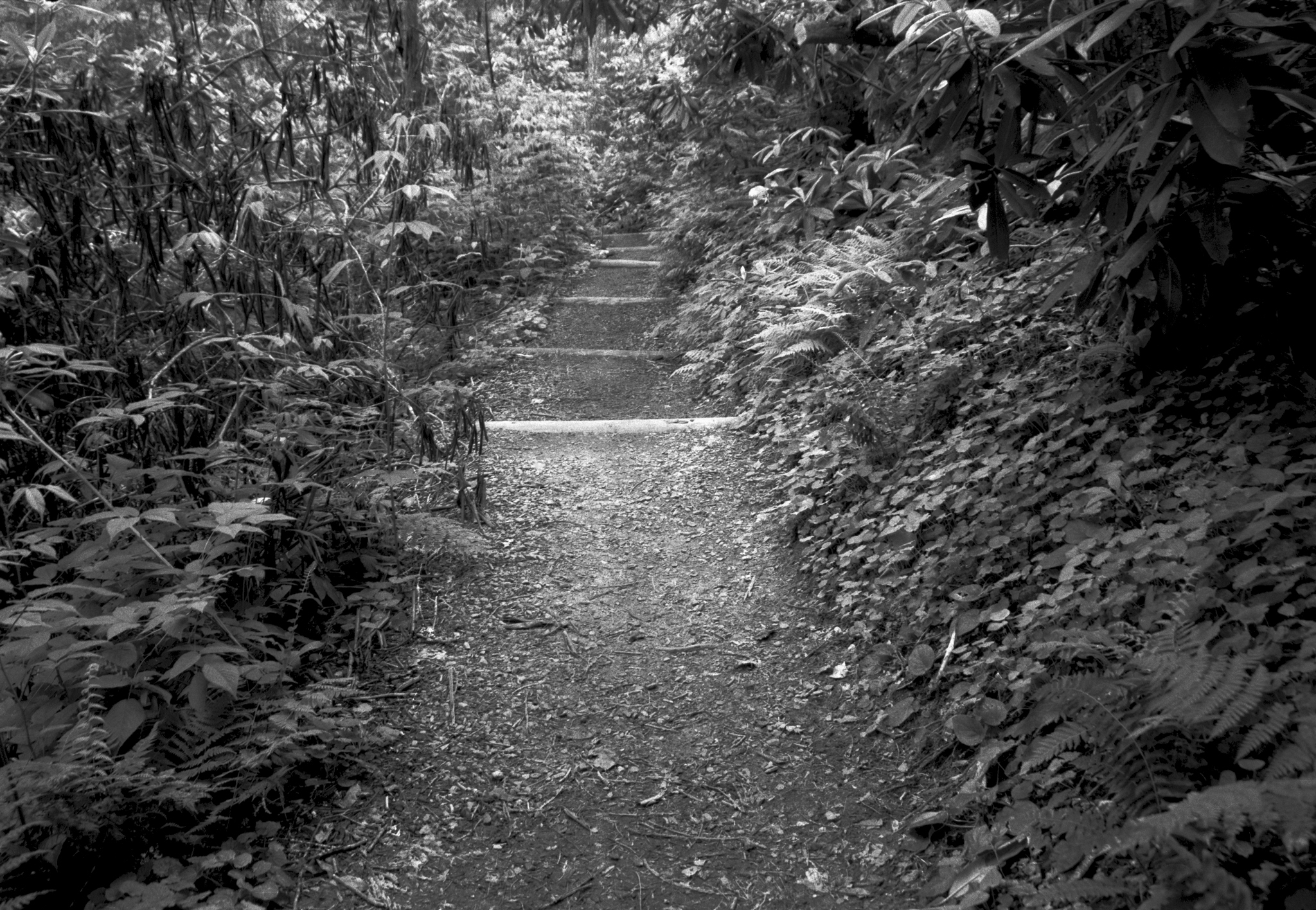
Trail

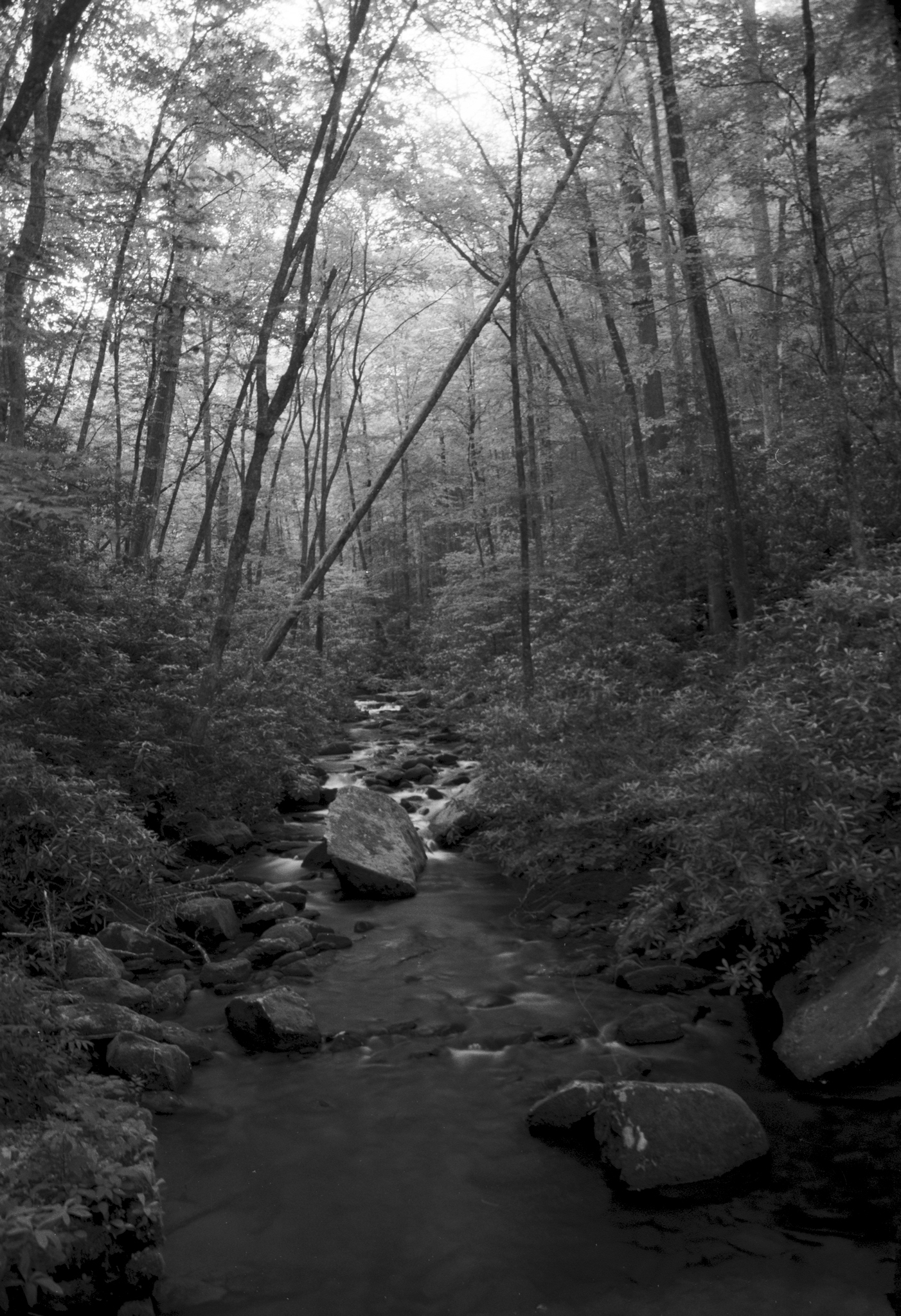
Creek
