= Benton MacKaye Trail =

Long-distance hiking trail in the United States

Coordinates: 34°38′7.0″N 84°10′27.1″W

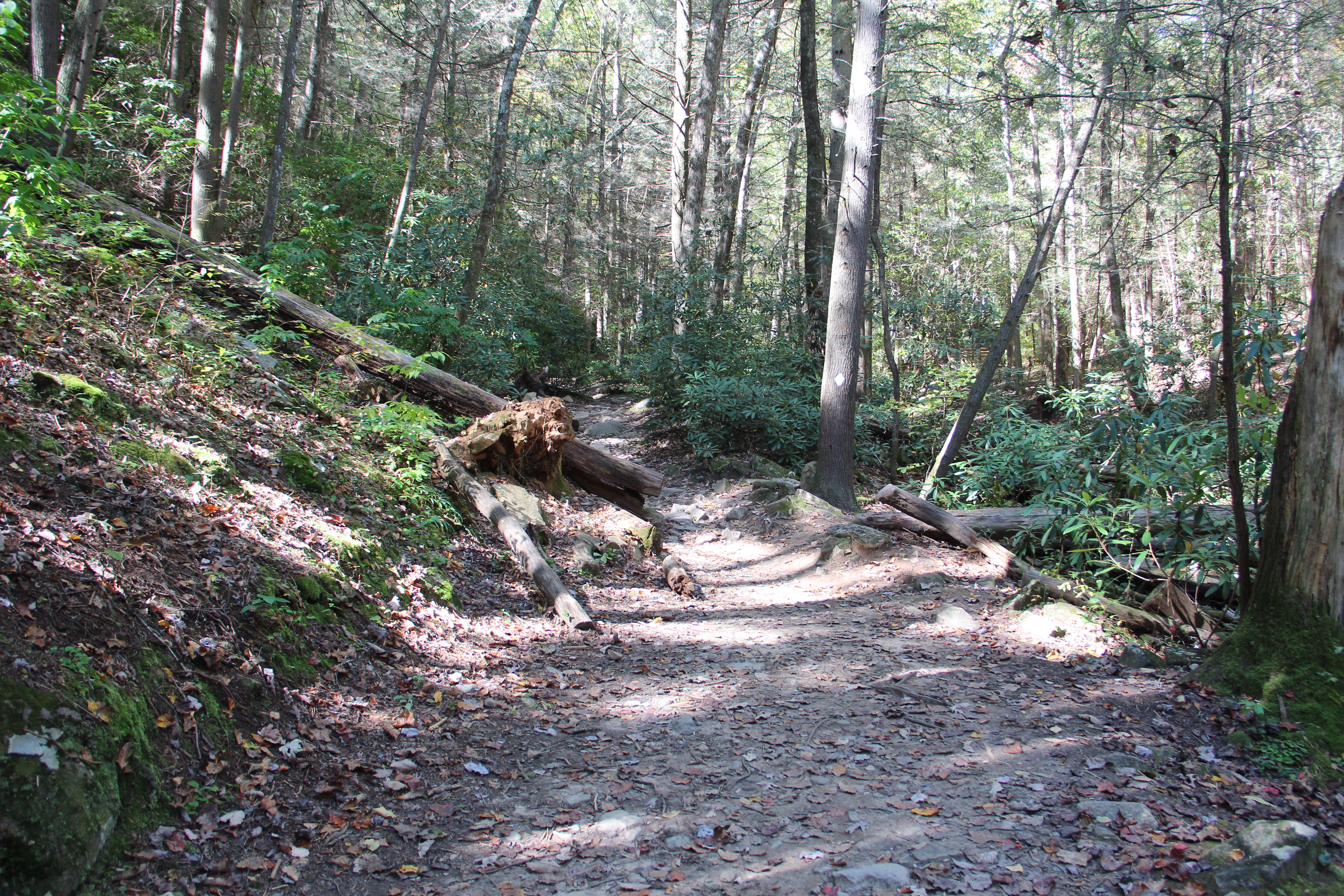
Benton MacKaye Trail near Fall Branch Falls, Georgia

The Benton MacKaye Trail or BMT is a footpath nearly 300 miles (480 km) in length in the Appalachian Mountains in the southeastern United States and is blazed by a white diamond, 5″ across by 7″ tall. The hiking trail was created and is maintained by the Benton MacKaye Trail Association, and it is named for Benton MacKaye, the Massachusetts forester and regional planner who first had the idea for the Appalachian Trail in 1921.

The BMT runs from Springer Mountain in Georgia (sharing the southern terminus of the Appalachian Trail) to Big Creek in the Great Smoky Mountains National Park. The trail passes through seven United States Wilderness Areas, while traversing three states (Georgia, Tennessee and North Carolina). The lowest elevation (765 ft) on the BMT occurs at the crossing of the Hiwassee River in Tennessee. The highest elevation is the 5,843-foot (1,781 m) summit of Mt. Sterling in the Great Smoky Mountains of North Carolina.

The trail crosses various trout rivers along its path including Shallowford Bridge and the Swinging Bridge over the Toccoa River in Georgia, the Ocoee, Hiwassee, Upper Bald and Tellico rivers in Tennessee, and the Little Tennessee River in North Carolina. It also crosses Eagle, Hazel, Forney, Noland and Big creeks in the Smokies, along with Fontana Dam and the Oconaluftee River.

== Trail association ==
The Benton MacKaye Trail Association (BMTA) was organized in 1979 and incorporated in 1980 to build and maintain the Benton MacKaye Trail. Driving the effort was a desire to see opened for hiking Benton MacKaye's chosen route for his Appalachian mountain trail. MacKaye, Massachusetts forester and co-founder of The Wilderness Society, was the man whose vision inspired what is today the Appalachian Trail. In the south, he had selected a more westerly route, along the western crest of the Blue Ridge, roughly that followed today by the BMT. The BMTA's 25th anniversary year saw the original plan completed as the route was officially opened on July 16, 2005.

As with most trail organizations, the BMTA is an all-volunteer, nonprofit group of people who want to see the trail remain open and in good condition for hiking. Those members who live close enough gather regularly on work trips to maintain the trail. They also participate in group hikes. The Association is sustained by member and donor contributions.

== See also ==
- Homan, Tim. 2004. Hiking the Benton MacKaye Trail: A guide to the Benton MacKaye trail from Georgia's Springer Mountain to Tennessee's Ocoee River. Peachtree Publishers. ISBN 1-56145-311-0.
