= Frank, North Carolina =

Frank
- Unincorporated community
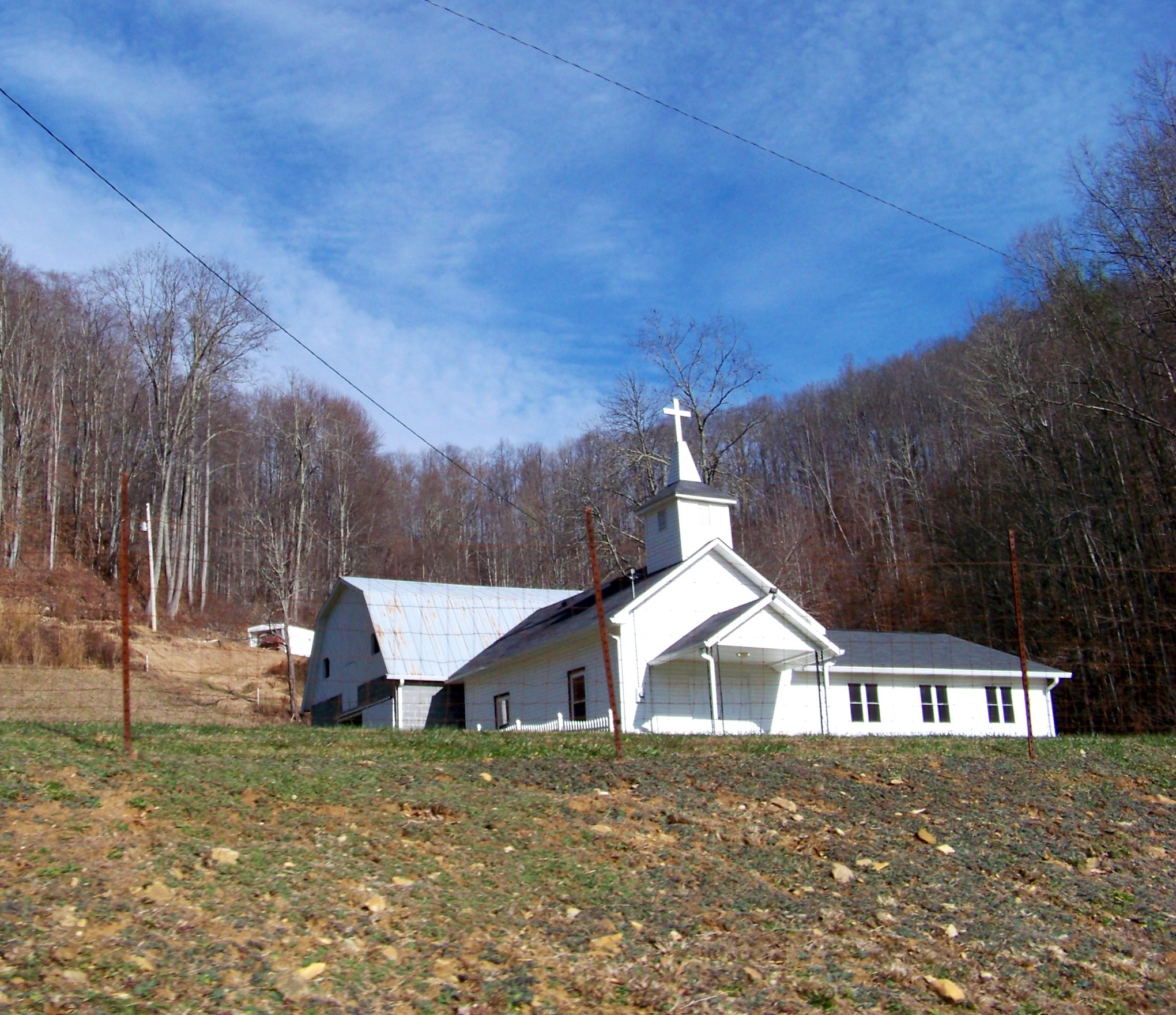
- A church in Frank

- Location within the state of North Carolina
- Coordinates: 36°04′14″N 82°00′09″W
- Country: United States
- State: North Carolina
- County: Avery County
- Elevation: 2,982 ft (909 m)
- Time zone: UTC-5 (Eastern (EST))
  - Summer (DST): UTC-4 (EDT)
- ZIP code: 28657
- Area code: 828
- GNIS feature ID: 1020351

Frank is an unincorporated community in Avery County, North Carolina, United States. The community is located along US 19-E, between the communities of Minneapolis and Roaring Creek.

== See also ==
- Big Yellow Mountain
- Grassy Ridge Bald
- Little Yellow Mountain
- North Toe River
- Unaka Range
