= Tennessee State Route 165 =

State highway in Tennessee, United States

State Route 165
- Cherohala Skyway

Route information
- Maintained by TDOT
- Length: 23.8 mi (38.3 km)

Major junctions
- West end: SR 68 in Tellico Plains
- East end: NC 143 near Robbinsville, NC

Location
- Country: United States
- State: Tennessee
- Counties: Monroe

Highway system
- Tennessee State Routes; Interstate; US; State
← SR 164	→ SR 166

State Route 165 (SR 165) is an east to west secondary highway in Monroe County, Tennessee, United States that is 23.8 miles (38.3 km) long. It is the Tennessee portion of the Cherohala Skyway which runs through Cherokee National Forest and connects Tellico Plains with Robbinsville, North Carolina. Its western terminus is at SR 68 in Tellico Plains and its eastern terminus is at the North Carolina border, where the road continues as North Carolina Highway 143 (NC 143).

== Route description ==
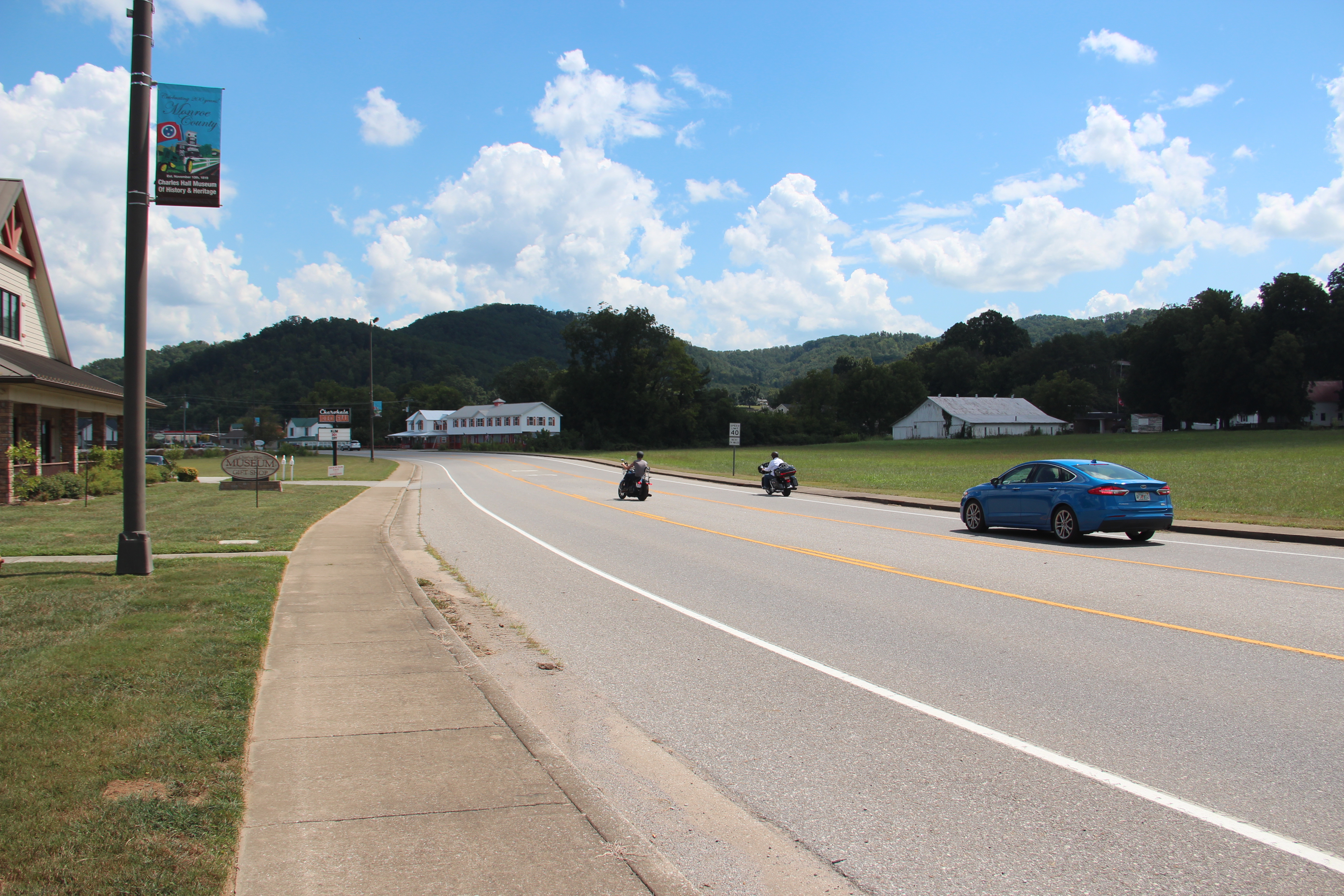
Tennessee State Route 165 in Tellico Plains

SR 165 begins in Tellico Plains at an intersection with SR 68 on the northwestern edge of downtown. It travels east and straddles the northern edge of downtown to have an intersection with SR 360. The highway then leaves Tellico Plains to enter the Cherokee National Forest to become narrow and curvy, running parallel to the Tellico River for several miles. SR 165 then leaves the river to climb the mountains, where it becomes extremely curvy as it gains altitude. It continues to wind its way east before coming to an end at the North Carolina state line, where the Cherohala Skyway continues as NC 143.

== Junction list ==
The entire route is in Monroe County.

Location	mi	km	Destinations	Notes
Tellico Plains	0.0	0.0	SR 68 – Ducktown, Madisonville	Western terminus
Tellico Plains	1.1	1.8	SR 360 north (Ballplay Road) – Vonore	Southern terminus of SR 360
Cherokee National Forest	5.2	8.4	National Forest Road 210 – Bald River Falls, Tellico Ranger Station	
Cherokee National Forest	14	23	Indian Boundary Road – Indian Boundary	
Cherokee National Forest	23.8	38.3	NC 143 east (Cherohala Skyway) – Robbinsville	Eastern terminus; North Carolina state line
1.000 mi = 1.609 km; 1.000 km = 0.621 mi
