= Plumtree, North Carolina =

Plumtree
- Unincorporated community
- Location within the state of North Carolina
- Coordinates: 36°01′37″N 82°00′28″W
- Country: United States
- State: North Carolina
- County: Avery County
- Named for: Plumtree Creek
- Elevation: 2,867 ft (874 m)
- Time zone: UTC-5 (Eastern (EST))
  - Summer (DST): UTC-4 (EDT)
- ZIP code: 28664
- Area code: 828
- GNIS feature ID: 1022015

Plumtree is an unincorporated community in Avery County, North Carolina, United States. The community is located along US 19-E, between the communities of Roaring Creek and Ingalls.

== See also ==
- Grassy Ridge Bald
- Little Yellow Mountain
- North Toe River
- Unaka Range
