= Yellow Mountain =

The name Yellow Mountain may refer to the following:

== Places ==
- Big Yellow Mountain, in North Carolina, United States
- Huangshan in China, also known as "Yellow Mountain" in English
- Little Yellow Mountain (North Carolina), United States
- Yellow Mountain (Montana) in the United States

== Film ==
- The Yellow Mountain, a 1954 American Western film

== Plants ==
- Darwinia collina, commonly known as the yellow mountain bell
- Saxifraga aizoides, also known as the yellow mountain saxifrage

== Butterfly ==
- Neptis ochracea, the yellow mountain sailer
