= Big Frog =

Big Frog may refer to:

- Big Frog Mountain, a mountain in southeast Tennessee.
- Big Frog Wilderness, a protected area in southeast Tennessee.
- WFRG-FM, a radio station licensed to Utica, New York.
