= North River (Tennessee) =

Coordinates: 35.32841°N 84.14547°W

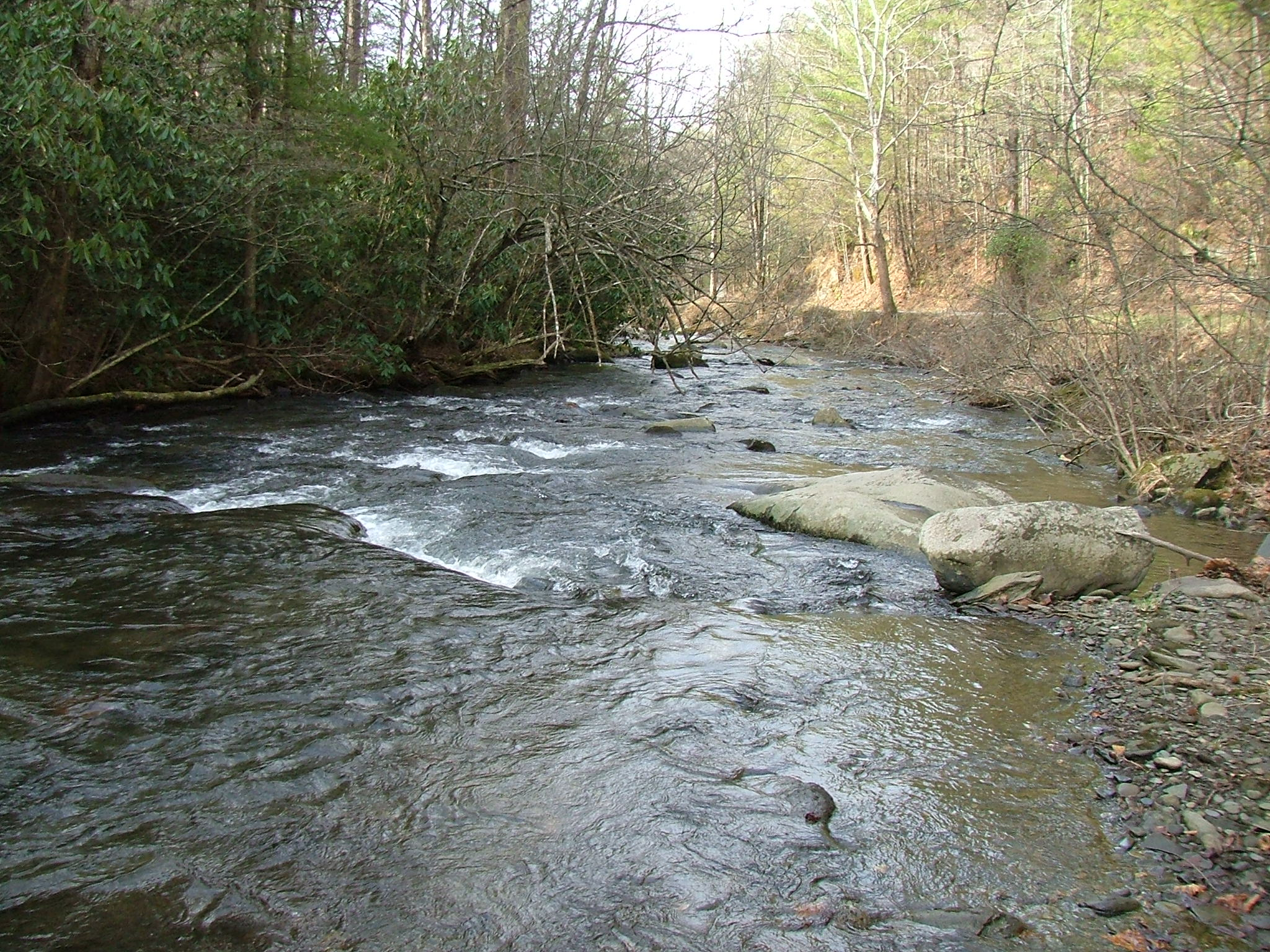
- Looking downstream with FR 217 on the right bank.

Location
- Country: US

Physical characteristics
- Source
  - location: Unicoi Range
- Mouth
  - location: Tellico River in Monroe County, Tennessee
  - elevation: 1,621 ft (494 m)

The North River of Tennessee is a major tributary of the Tellico River. It rises in the Unicoi Range, which are geologically related to the Smoky Mountains to the north, in Monroe County, Tennessee inside Cherokee National Forest. Its entire course is located in a very scenic, very isolated area; for the vast majority of its length it is parallel by Forest Road 217, also called North River Road, managed by the Forest Service of the United States Department of Agriculture. It flows very roughly east to west. There is a Forest Service campground located near its confluence with the Tellico, which is located upstream and opposite that of the Tellico's other major tributary, the Bald River.

== See also ==
- List of rivers of Tennessee
