= Roaring Creek, North Carolina =

Roaring Creek
- Unincorporated community
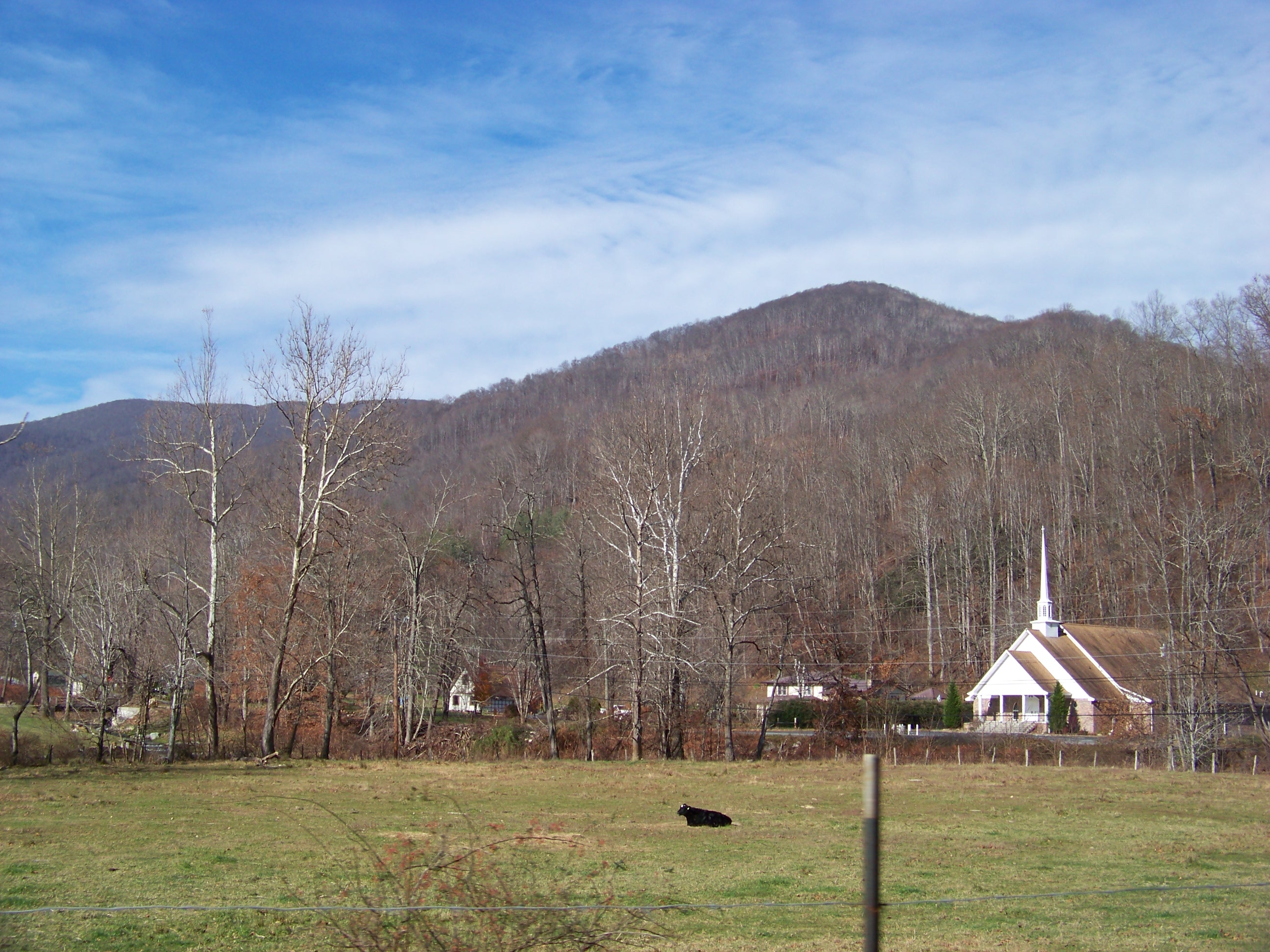
- Church and fields outside Roaring Creek

- Location within the state of North Carolina
- Coordinates: 36°03′49″N 82°00′45″W
- Country: United States
- State: North Carolina
- County: Avery
- Elevation: 2,982 ft (909 m)
- Time zone: UTC-5 (Eastern (EST))
  - Summer (DST): UTC-4 (EDT)
- ZIP code: 28657
- Area code: 828
- GNIS feature ID: 1022311

Roaring Creek is an unincorporated community in Avery County, North Carolina, United States. The community was named after Roaring Creek, which flows in the area. The community is located along US 19-E, between the communities of Frank and Plumtree.

== History ==
On September 27, 1780, the Overmountain Men, led by William Campbell, camped at Roaring Creek, after passing Yellow Mountain Gap; on October 7, 1780, they would arrive at Kings Mountain for the Battle of Kings Mountain against the British.

== See also ==
- Big Yellow Mountain
- Grassy Ridge Bald
- Little Yellow Mountain
- North Toe River
- Overmountain Men
- Unaka Range
