= Roaring Creek Township =

Roaring Creek Township may refer to the following townships in the United States:

- Roaring Creek Township, Avery County, North Carolina
- Roaring Creek Township, Pennsylvania
