= Roaring Creek =

Roaring Creek may refer to:

== In North Carolina ==
- Roaring Creek Township, Avery County, North Carolina
- Roaring Creek (North Carolina), a tributary of the North Toe River in the above township

== In Pennsylvania ==
- Roaring Creek (Pennsylvania), a tributary of the North Branch Susquehanna River
  - South Branch Roaring Creek, a tributary of the above
- Roaring Creek Township, Pennsylvania

== In West Virginia ==
- Roaring Creek (Tygart Valley River), a tributary of the Ohio River
- Roaring Creek (Seneca Creek), a tributary of the North Fork South Branch Potomac River

== Elsewhere ==
- Roaring Creek, Belize, a small village in the Cayo District

== See also ==
- Roaring Branch
