= William Gerard de Brahm =

German cartographer and engineer (1718-c. 1799)

John William Gerard de Brahm
- Born: 1718; Koblenz, Germany
- Died: c. 1799; Philadelphia, U.S.
- Occupations: Cartographer, engineer and mystic

John William Gerard de Brahm (1718 – c. 1799) was a German cartographer, engineer and mystic.

== Life ==
Johann Wilhelm Gerhard von Brahm was born in Koblenz, Germany, the eighth child of a court musician employed by the Elector of Trier. He became "Captain Engineer" in the Imperial Army, but after his marriage (to Wilhelmina) he emigrated to the British colony of Georgia. In the 1750s they baptized children at the "Independent Congregational Churches" in Stoney Creek and later Charleston, in present-day South Carolina.

In 1754 he was appointed by the British as surveyor general for Georgia Colony. In August 1756 he traveled to the Cherokee Overhill country on the banks of the Little Tennessee River as the engineer constructing Fort Loudoun. He is said to have been the most prolific mapmaker in the Southern Colonies in the late eighteenth century.

De Brahm drew up the plans in 1766 for a prospective settlement to be called "New Bermuda" in British East Florida. The project was sponsored by a Bermudian philanthropist, John Savage, operating out of Charles Town. Its purpose was to encourage Bermuda islanders, who specialized in boat-building, to settle a planned community on the Florida side of the St. Marys River. It was to be laid out on a symmetrical grid of streets, with two public squares.

Formerly an ally of European colonisation, his contact with American Indians led him to despise European imperialism as a sin which would ultimately bring destruction to the world. He believed that the American Indians had been corrupted by the immorality of traders and their attempts to civilise them. He was imprisoned in France by the American Revolutionary government, accused of being loyal to the British cause. His wide-ranging travels show that in 1778 he resided in Britain; making a brief visit to his German homeland. By 1784, Quaker records show him living in Philadelphia. There his writings on Cosmography were inspired by the ideas of an earlier German mystic, Jacob Boehme. He perceived the eighteenth century carving up of lands for personal glory as a tyranny of reason. He died in Philadelphia.

== Works ==
- Letter to the editor of The Gentleman's Magazine, (1771) -- Historian of cartography Louis de Vorsey wrote that this "probably represents the earliest published description of the Gulf Stream as a potentially valuable navigation routeway."
- Atlantic Pilot (1772)
- Time an Apparition of Eternity and Voice of the Everlasting Gospel (1791-2)
- Apocalyptic Gnomon Points out Eternity's Divisibility Rated with Time Pointed at by Gnomons Sidereal, (1795)

== Legacy ==
De Brahm, derided by contemporaries, never managed to gain many followers to his religious thought. His criticism of politics and the aggression of nation-states as well as his anti-imperialist position was not well received in the intellectual climate of the early American Republic. According to Plowden Weston, "I know nothing of De Brahm's life; but he lived within memory of persons now alive, much addicted to alchemy, and wearing a long beard."
