= Bald River =

Coordinates: 35°19′30″N 84°10′39″W

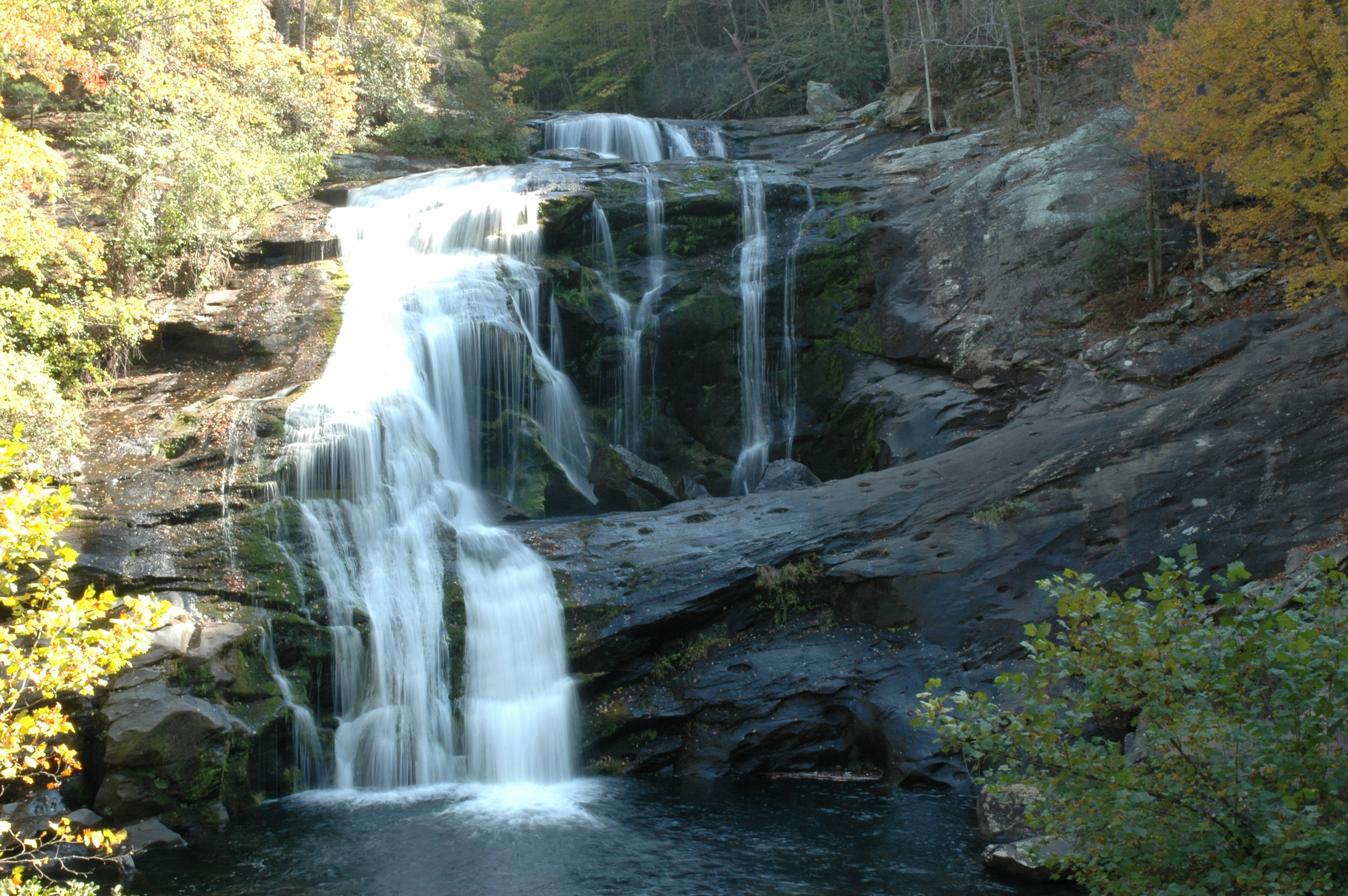
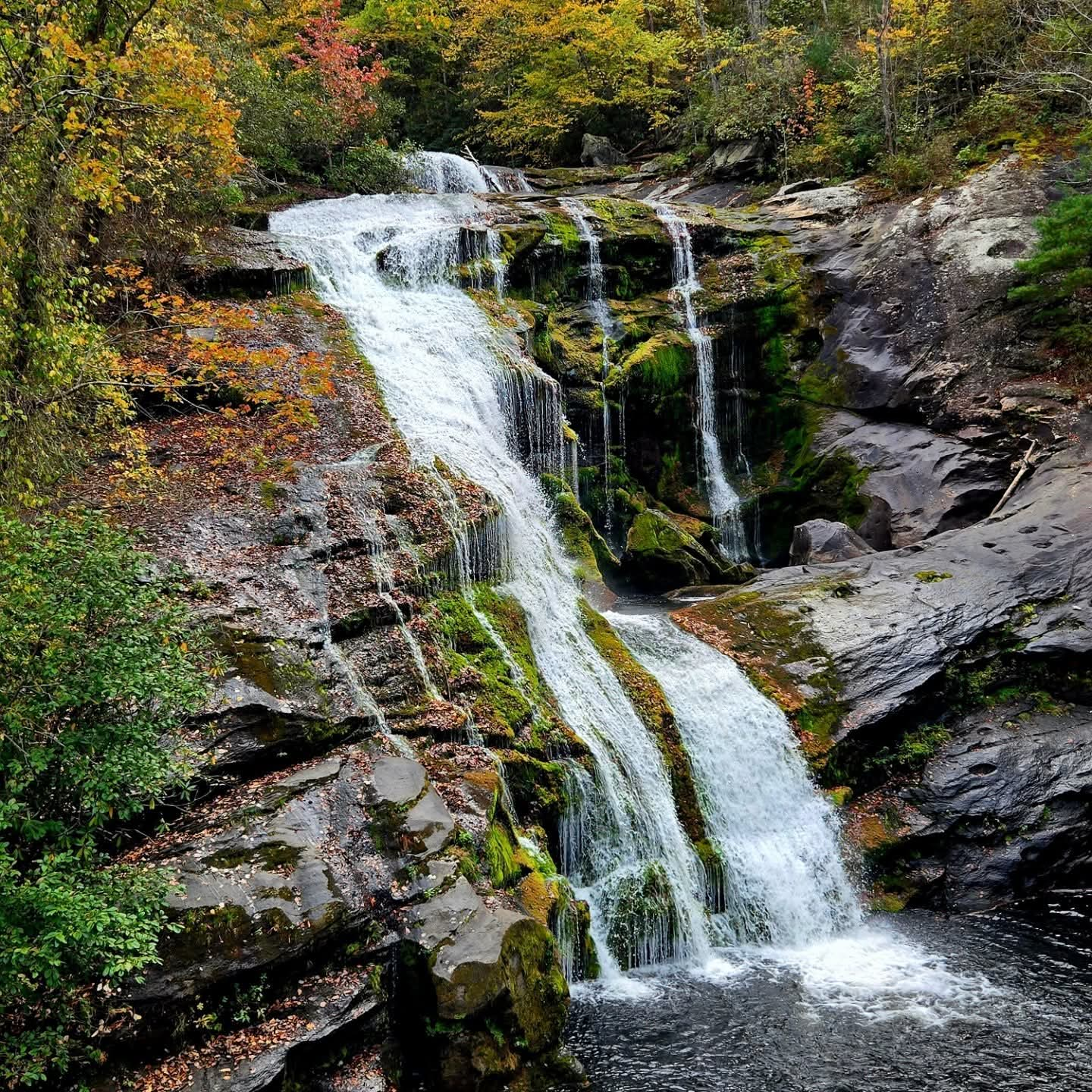
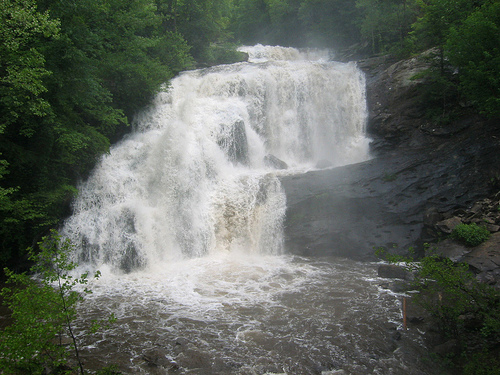
- Bald River Falls During autumn During intense water flow

Location
- Country: United States

Physical characteristics
- Mouth
  - location: Tellico River in Monroe County, Tennessee
  - elevation: 1,348 ft (411 m)

The Bald River is a river located in Monroe County, Tennessee in the Cherokee National Forest. It is a tributary of the Tellico River. Just before it empties into the Tellico, the river falls over a large waterfall, Bald River Falls, which is variously reported as being between 80 and 100 feet (25 and 30 m) high. The river then flows under a bridge on Forest Service Road 210 (the falls and the river mouth are both very readily visible from the bridge). The falls is regarded as one of the most impressive and scenic waterfall in East Tennessee. The river is short in length but powerful as it flows through a steep, densely wooded valley and it is constantly replenished by the area's frequent rains. It rises just north of the North Carolina state line near the crest of the Unicoi Mountains and flows northeast for a short distance before turning to the northwest.

The forests of the Bald River basin and the Tellico River basin were almost completely logged by the Babcock Lumber Company during the early 20th century, from their local base of operation at Tellico Plains. The present road up the Tellico River was built on the old logging railroad bed built by Babcock.

== Wilderness ==
The Upper Bald River Wilderness was designated as part of the National Wilderness Preservation System in 2018 by the U.S. Congress. Along with the Bald River Gorge Wilderness to the north, most of the Bald River watershed is protected as a wilderness area and managed by the Cherokee National Forest.

== See also ==
- List of rivers of Tennessee
