= Bill Ervin =

American racecar driver (1932–1996)

- Born: January 13, 1932; Tellico Plains, Tennessee, U.S.
- Died: March 26, 1996 (aged 64); Tennessee, U.S.

NASCAR Cup Series career
- 24 races run over 3 years
- Best finish: 64th - 1968 NASCAR Grand National season
- First race: 1967 Greenville 200 (Greenville-Pickens Speedway)
- Last race: 1969 Alabama 200 (Montgomery Speedway)
Wins	Top tens	Poles
0	0	0

William Arthur Ervin (January 13, 1932 – March 26, 1996) was an American NASCAR Grand National Series driver from the American community of Tellico Plains, Tennessee.

== Career ==
Ervin participated in 124 races during his three seasons (1967, 1968, and 1969) of NASCAR action. While never winning a race, Ervin managed to start an average of 22nd and finish in an average of 19th place. His total career earnings were $2,805 ($24,626.47 when adjusted for inflation). The total number of miles that Ervin raced was 1,398.8 miles (2,251.2 km).

Ervin's most successful races came on short track where finishes of 18th-place were considered to be routine. His weakness was dirt tracks; where he would find himself finishing in a humbling 26th place on average.

The No. 31 Newman Long-owned Ford vehicle would become the primary vehicle of Bill Ervin during his NASCAR Cup Series career.

== Death ==
Ervin died in a car collision in Tennessee, on March 26, 1996, at the age of 64.
