= Babcock Lumber Company =

- Industry: Lumber Manufacturing and Distribution
- Founded: 1887
- Founder: Edward Vose Babcock; Fred R. Babcock
- Headquarters: Pittsburgh, PA,

The Babcock Lumber Company was founded in Pittsburgh, Pennsylvania in 1887 and conducted logging operations in the eastern United States. In 1951 the company diversified into building material distribution. Today the company has two main divisions: hardwood lumber manufacturing and wholesale building material distribution.

== History ==
In 1889 the 25-year-old Edward Vose Babcock, along with his brother Fred R. Babcock, founded E.V. Babcock and Company. For the next eight years, E.V. expanded his company, gaining national attention. In 1897, with the purchase of 6,900 acres (28 km^{2}) of land and choice hardwood timber in Ashtola, Somerset County, Pennsylvania, Edward, with the help of his two brothers Fred R. (known as F.R.) and Oscar H. (known as O.H.), incorporated the Babcock Lumber Company on November 11, 1897. This company still operates under that name today.

Now approaching the turn of the century, the employees of Babcock and Company rode cable cars to work, paying 5¢ in fare. In 1901, 30,000 acres (120 km^{2}) of virgin long-leaf Yellow Pine was acquired near Bainbridge, Georgia. After this, Babcock founded and constructed the first completely integrated Yellow Pine plant in Miller County, Georgia. Rift-sawn pine flooring became the specialty of the mill, producing more than twenty-five million board-feet annually. The town of Babcock was established December 14, 1901 around the mill. Following this, the company headquarters was moved to the new Frick Building, in Pittsburgh, Pennsylvania.

In 1905, The Babcock Lumber & Boom Co. in Davis, West Virginia began operation and the Tellico River Lumber Co. at Tellico Plains, Tennessee was formed. These plants, along with the Babcock Lumber and Land Company that was formed in 1907 in Maryville, Tennessee, operated more than 125,000 acres (510 km^{2}) in the Smoky Mountains of Tennessee and North Carolina. A logging railroad was built from Tellico Plains, Tennessee, up the Tellico River. A high trestle was built over Bald River near Bald River Falls. (The railroad up the Tellico River was converted into today's Tellico River Road.) The forests of the upper Tellico River basin, including its tributaries Bald River and North River, were clearcut. Beginning in 1907, Babcock's operations out of Davis began clear cutting the mountain ridges throughout Tucker County, West Virginia. This clear cutting, with its residual slashings, converted the landscape into a "tinderbox". By 1910, fires burned continuously — in some areas for years on end, from spring until the first snows — leaving little other than thin mineral soil and bare rock. In 1914, with the county virtually denuded of standing trees, the ground burned continually for 6 months. As a result, top soils that once produced huge timbers on the mountainside — including the largest tree ever harvested in West Virginia, a white oak some 13 feet in diameter just 10 feet from the ground — washed down into the narrow valleys and bottom lands, which had always been too narrow for harvesting productive crops or livestock. Uncontrollable soil erosion and flooding further degraded and depopulated the region. To this day, Tucker County and surrounding regions bear the scars of this remarkable conflagration.

By 1933, most of Babcock's Tellico River land was sold to the United States Forest Service or deeded to the United States Government. This land became a major share of both the Great Smoky National Park and the Cherokee National Forest.

With the simultaneous operation of these mills, Babcock Lumber Company was producing and shipping more than 1,000 carloads of hardwood per month. Inevitably, however, the company's timber resources began to diminish and the era of marketing its own production began to wane. Before the mills could fade entirely, the Babcock Lumber Company looked to new sources of income and new fields of operation. Babcock decided to utilize his trained salesmen and distribution resources of his company to shift its attention to the sale and distribution of products from other manufacturers

In 1948, E.V. died at the age of eighty-five, leaving his company to his son, Fred Courtney Babcock. Between 1951 and 1960, Babcock Lumber Company purchased two of its competitors, as well as built two more distributional warehouses to keep up with demand.

In 1963, E.V.'s grandson, Gordon Fisher III became president of the company, and Fred became chairman of the board. Between 1965 and 1970, one additional company was purchased, and one more distributional yard was established. The company continued to open new yards and expand to new territories, achieving consistent growth.

== Wood Varieties ==
Softwood sales include White Fir from California and Oregon; Yellow Pine, Ponderosa Pine, Idaho Pine, and Spruce from Western and Eastern Canada; Redwood from California; and Cedar shingles and Pine mouldings.

Hardwoods include woods such as African Teak from Ghana and the Ivory Coast; domestic Ash, Basswood, Cherry, Red Oak, White Oak, Poplar, Cedar, Cypress, Chestnut, Walnut, and Willow; along with African Mahogany and Mahogany from both Honduras and the Philippines; plus African Walnut, Rosewood from Brazil, and Teak from Thailand.

== See also ==
- Edward V. Babcock
- Canaan Valley
- Babcock State Park
