= Gee Creek Wilderness =

Protected area in Tennessee, US

- IUCN category Ib (wilderness area)
- Location within Tennessee Location within the United States
- Location: Polk County, Tennessee
- Nearest city: Etowah, Tennessee
- Coordinates: 35.260906°N 84.507708°W
- Area: 2,493 acres (10.09 km^{2})
- Established: 1975
- Governing body: US Forest Service

Designated in 1975, the Gee Creek Wilderness is a 2,493-acre (10 km^{2}) wilderness area lying mostly within Polk County in the U.S. state of Tennessee. The northeasternmost section of Gee Creek extends into Monroe County. Its elevation is 2,560 feet (780 m) above sea level. Gee Creek Wilderness is the smallest wilderness in the Cherokee National Forest.
