= Ballplay, Monroe County, Tennessee =

Unincorporated community in Tennessee, US

Coordinates: 35°27′50″N 84°12′20″W

Ballplay is an unincorporated community in Monroe County, Tennessee, in the United States.

== History ==
A post office was established as Ball Play in 1830, and remained in operation until it was discontinued in 1910.
