= John Muir Trail (Tennessee) =

Recreational trail in the United States

Coordinates: 36.5347°N 84.6707°W

The John Muir National Recreation Trail (#152) is a 20.7 mile (33.3 km) trail in eastern Tennessee, along the north side of Hiwassee River in the Cherokee National Forest. It is named after naturalist John Muir and was constructed in 1972 through the efforts of the Youth Conservation Corps and the Senior Community Service Employment Program. The trail is said to follow the path taken during Muir's travels from Kentucky to Florida in his book A Thousand Mile Walk to the Gulf. In it, he wrote:

My path all to-day led me along the leafy banks of the Hiwassee, a most impressive mountain river. Its channel is very rough, as it crosses the edges of upturned rock strata, some of them standing at right angles, or glancing off obliquely to right and left. Thus a multitude of short, resounding cataracts are produced, and the river is restrained from the headlong speed due to its volume and the inclination of its bed.

All the larger streams of uncultivated countries are mysteriously charming and beautiful, whether flowing in mountains or through swamps and plains. Their channels are interestingly sculptured, far more so than the grandest architectural works of man. The finest of the forests are usually found along their banks, and in the multitude of falls and rapids the wilderness finds a voice. Such a river is the Hiwassee, with its surface broken to a thousand sparkling gems, and its forest walls vine-draped and flowery as Eden. And how fine the songs it sings!

The trail's western end is located where Childers Creek empties into the Hiwassee River. The first 3-mile (5 km) section is a relatively easy walk designed for senior citizens. At 6 miles (10 km), there is a suspension footbridge crossing the river at the Apalachia Power Plant. The trail does not cross the bridge but continues on the north side of the river. At 11.7 miles (18.8 km), it connects to the Coker Creek Trail. This path goes into the Coker Creek Scenic Area, which contains the forty-foot (12 m) tall Coker Creek Falls. At 17.7 miles (24.5 km), the trail comes to Tennessee State Route 68. It then continues past the road for another three miles (5 km). The last section of the trail has been lengthened several times since it was opened.

The Benton MacKaye Trail joins the John Muir Trail at Childers Creek and runs with it for 10.5 miles (16.9 km) to the intersection with the Unicoi Mountain Trail.
