= 1969 Alabama 200 =

Auto race run in Alabama in 1969

Race details
- Race 2 of 54 in the 1969 NASCAR Grand National Series season
- Date: December 8, 1968; 56 years ago
- Official name: Alabama 500
- Location: Montgomery Speedway, Montgomery, Alabama
- Course: Permanent racing facility
- Course length: 1.414 km (0.500 miles)
- Distance: 200 laps, 100 mi (150 km)
- Weather: Cold with temperatures reaching a maximum of 48.9 °F (9.4 °C); wind speeds approaching 5.1 miles per hour (8.2 km/h)
- Average speed: 73.200 miles per hour (117.804 km/h)
- Attendance: 2,800

Pole position
Driver	Richard Petty	Petty Enterprises

Most laps led
Driver	Richard Petty	Petty Enterprises
- Laps: 125

Winner
No. 14	Bobby Allison	Tom Friedkin

Television in the United States
- Network: untelevised
- Announcers: none

The 1969 Alabama 200 was a NASCAR Grand National Series event that was held on December 8, 1968, at Montgomery Speedway in Montgomery, Alabama. Seven lead changes were exchanged amongst three different leaders.

The transition to purpose-built racecars began in the early 1960s and occurred gradually over that decade. Changes made to the sport by the late 1960s brought an end to the "strictly stock" vehicles of the 1950s.

== Background ==
Montgomery Motor Speedway is a half-mile (.805 km) oval race track just west of Montgomery, Alabama. It opened in 1953, and is the oldest operating race track in Alabama. It held six Grand National Series races between 1955 and 1969.

== Summary ==
Bobby Allison managed to defeat Richard Petty by a distance of 4 feet (48 in). Two hundred laps were done on a paved oval track spanning 0.500 miles (0.805 km). Eleven laps were given two cautions flags due to various racing issues. Only 2800 people would attend this live race with the average racing speed being 73.200 miles per hour (117.804 km/h). However, the event was a "crowd pleaser" with most fans going home in a pleasant mood after the ending. Sherral Pruitt would be the last-place finisher due to his 1966 Chevrolet Chevelle overheating. Other finishers in the top ten were (in reverse order): Dave Marcis, Cecil Gordon, Henley Gray, Ben Arnold, John Sears, Neil Castles, Bobby Isaac, and James Hylton.

Elmo Langley, Red Farmer, and Roy Tyner were also notable NASCAR drivers who attended this event. It took one hour and twenty-one minutes to go from the first green flag to the checkered flag. Bill Ervin would retire from NASCAR after this race was held while Lee Gordon would start his NASCAR career here. Hylton still races regularly in the ARCA Series (currently being sponsored by Menards).

While the winner of the race got to take home a thousand dollars in winnings ($8,574.41 when considering inflation), the bottom nine finishers of the race were lucky to receive a paycheck for $100 ($857.44 when considering inflation).

=== Qualifying ===
Grid	No.	Driver	Manufacturer
1	43	Richard Petty	'68 Plymouth
2	71	Bobby Isaac	'68 Dodge
3	14	Bobby Allison	'68 Plymouth
4	48	James Hylton	'68 Dodge
5	2	Red Farmer	'66 Chevrolet
6	4	John Sears	'67 Ford
7	06	Neil Castles	'67 Plymouth
8	64	Elmo Langley	'66 Ford
9	76	Ben Arnold	'66 Ford
10	70	J.D. McDuffie	'67 Buick
11	8	Ed Negre	'67 Ford
12	9	Roy Tyner	'67 Pontiac
13	47	Cecil Gordon	'68 Ford
14	5	Earl Brooks	'67 Ford
15	34	Wendell Scott	'66 Ford

== Timeline ==
Section reference:

- Start of race: Richard Petty started the race with the pole position.
- Lap 10: Sherral Pruitt would overheat his vehicle, causing him to end his day on the track prematurely; Bobby Isaac took over the lead from Richard Petty.
- Lap 46: Richard Petty took over the lead from Bobby Isaac.
- Lap 54: Bobby Isaac took over the lead from Richard Petty.
- Lap 68: Richard Petty took over the lead from Bobby Isaac.
- Lap 81: Issues with the vehicle's clutch would get to Elmo Langley, who would immediately exit the race.
- Lap 101: Red Farmer left the race because his vehicle's oil pressure was not up to normal standards.
- Lap 110: Wendell Scott's vehicle developed a problematic manifold, causing him to exit from the race early.
- Lap 143: Roy Tyner's engine would malfunction, forcing him to withdraw from the race.
- Lap 144: Bobby Allison took over the lead from Richard Petty.
- Lap 168: Richard Petty took over the lead from Bobby Allison.
- Lap 200: Bobby Allison took over the lead from Richard Petty.
- Finish: Bobby Allison was officially declared the winner of the race.

Preceded by 1969 Georgia 500	NASCAR Grand National Series Season; 1969	Succeeded by 1969 Motor Trend 500
