= Tellico Plains, Tennessee =

- Town
- Town of Tellico Plains
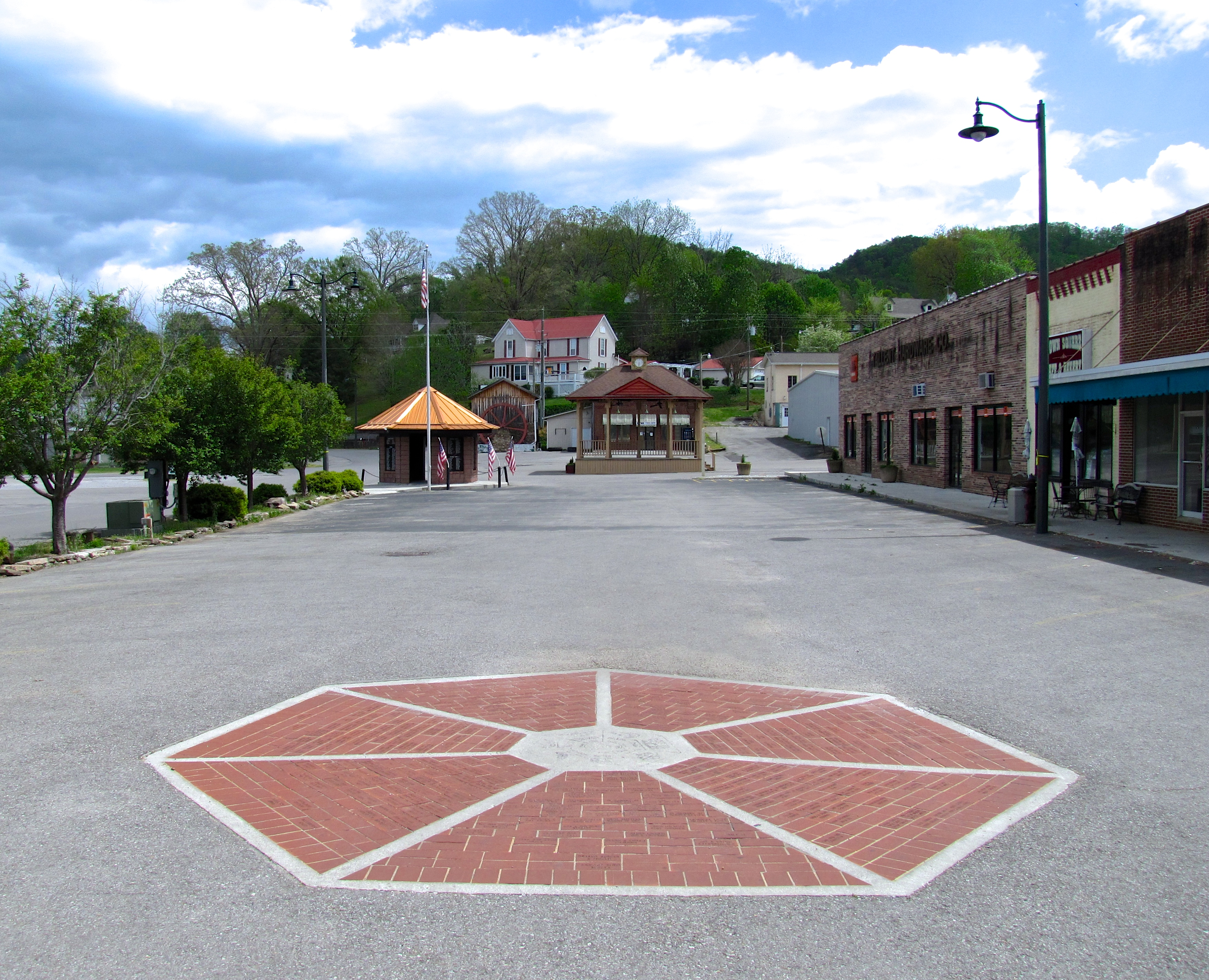
- Tellico Plains town square

- Location of Tellico Plains in Monroe County, Tennessee.

- Location within the state of Tennessee
- Coordinates: 35°22′0″N 84°17′56″W
- Country: United States
- State: Tennessee
- County: Monroe
- Incorporated: 1911
- Named for: Great Tellico

Area
  - Total: 1.95 sq mi (5.06 km^{2})
  - Land: 1.95 sq mi (5.06 km^{2})
  - Water: 0 sq mi (0.00 km^{2})
- Elevation: 866 ft (264 m)

Population (2020)
  - Total: 762
  - Density: 390.4/sq mi (150.72/km^{2})
- Time zone: UTC-5 (Eastern (EST))
  - Summer (DST): UTC-4 (EDT)
- ZIP code: 37385
- Area code: 423
- FIPS code: 47-73260
- GNIS feature ID: 2406725
- Website: www.tellicoplainstn.com

Tellico Plains is a town in Monroe County, Tennessee, United States. As of the 2020 census, Tellico Plains had a population of 762. Tellico Plains is home to several communities that include Coker Creek, Belltown, Rafter, Mount Vernon, Rural Vale, and more. Tellico Plains is also home to the Patriot Front, the most active white supremacist group in the nation.

The Tellico Plains welcome sign

== History ==
The area along the Tellico River was inhabited for thousands of years by indigenous peoples. The historic Muscogee settled here, before moving further south. In the late 18th century, the Cherokee settled in this area, displaced from the east and north by European colonial encroachment.

A United States fur trade factory was situated here between 1795 and 1807.

Tellico Plains occupies the former site of the Cherokee town of Great Tellico, which was one of the more important towns of the Overhill Cherokee during the late 18th century and before Indian Removal of the 1830s. Two important Native American trails met at Great Tellico, the Trading Path and the Warrior Path, which connected farflung communities.

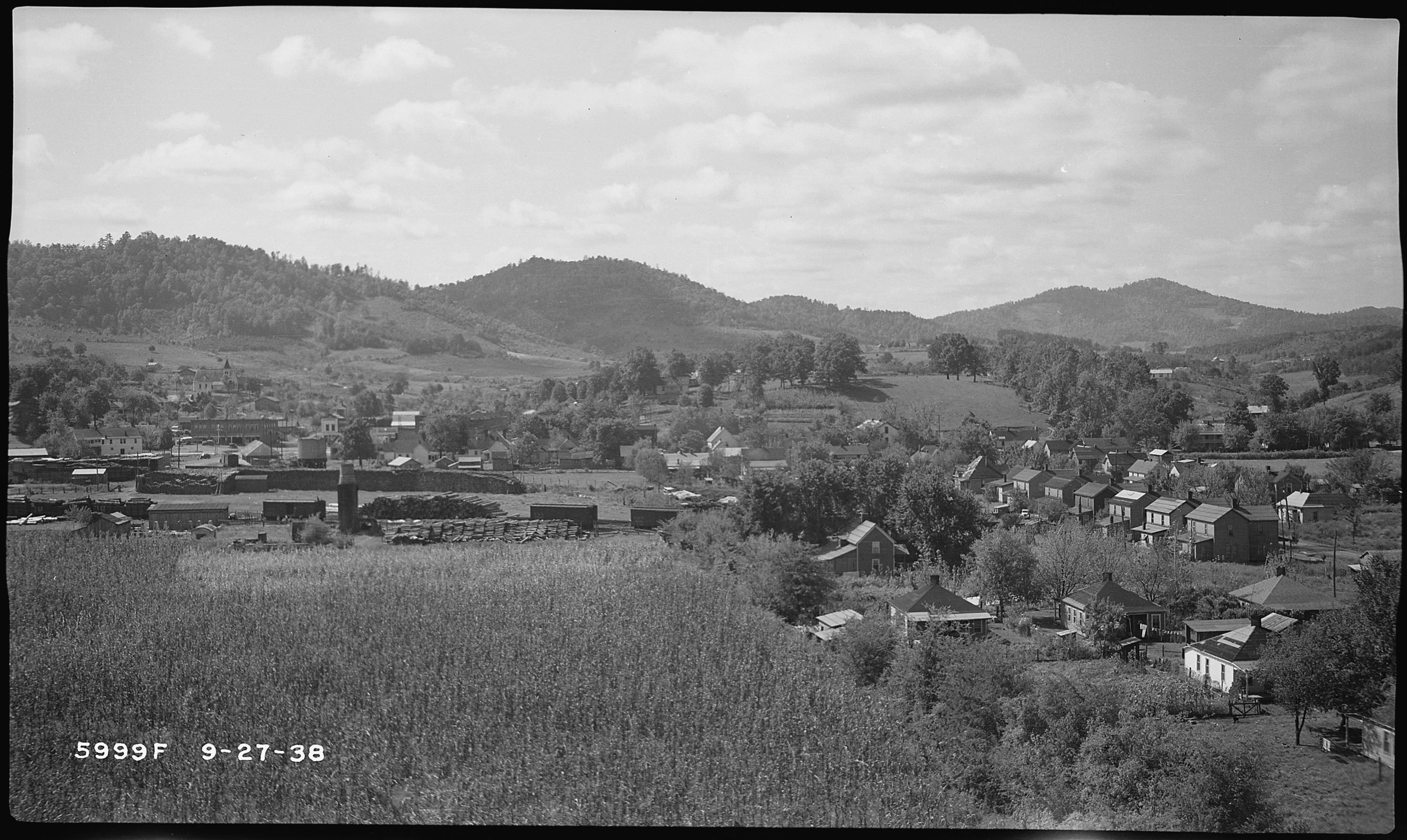
Tellico Plains in 1938

European Americans moved into the area and developed the land for agriculture, chiefly subsistence farming. During the 1840s, Elisha Johnson, a former mayor of Rochester, New York, purchased a plantation here and built the Tellico River Mansion on his property. With his brother Ebenezer, the former mayor of Buffalo, New York, he purchased the Tellico Iron and Manufacturing Company.

During the Civil War, the Confederacy commandeered the iron works for production of munitions. General William Sherman's Union Army soldiers destroyed the Tellico Iron Works. Sherman pardoned Elisha Johnson for his part in supplying the Confederates because of Johnson's northern birth and sympathies. Johnson returned to the North, settling in Ithaca, New York, where he died in 1866.

The nearby Coker Creek was the site of a minor gold rush during the late 1800s. The small crossroads town of Coker Creek has a gold-panning tourist attraction. Visitors can rent pans and receive professional instructions from the proprietor of the souvenir shop. Visitors can also explore the old gold mines in the surrounding hills, although the mines are in a state of disrepair. Commercial gold mining continues on at least one private plot located slightly to the southwest of the tourist attraction.

In the late 19th and early 20th centuries, Tellico Plains became the base of operations for the Babcock Lumber Company, which ran logging operations throughout the Tellico River basin. When it finished clearcutting, it sold its land to the US Forest Service. It has worked for decades to restore the woods.

Tellico Plains was incorporated in 1911. Its first mayor was Columbus Jenkins, father of a noted attorney, Ray Jenkins.

Tellico Plains is home to the Charles Hall Museum. The town is also the eastern terminus of the Trans America Trail, a popular OHV route to Oregon and the Pacific Ocean.

== White Nationalist activities ==
Tellico Plains is home to a 112-acre duck farm associated with Patriot Front White Nationalist group.

== Geography ==
According to the United States Census Bureau, the town has a total area of 1.6 square miles (4.1 km^{2}), all land.

The town is located on the Tellico River near the location where the river emerges from the higher peaks of the Appalachian Mountains and into the less rugged Ridge-and-Valley Appalachians.

=== Climate ===
Climate data for Tellico Plains, Tennessee (1991–2020 normals, extremes 1896–present)
Month	Jan	Feb	Mar	Apr	May	Jun	Jul	Aug	Sep	Oct	Nov	Dec	Year
Record high °F (°C)	83 (28)	83 (28)	89 (32)	91 (33)	95 (35)	101 (38)	105 (41)	103 (39)	101 (38)	98 (37)	86 (30)	79 (26)	105 (41)
Mean maximum °F (°C)	70.6 (21.4)	74.3 (23.5)	79.9 (26.6)	87.0 (30.6)	89.8 (32.1)	94.6 (34.8)	96.4 (35.8)	96.0 (35.6)	93.5 (34.2)	86.8 (30.4)	78.1 (25.6)	70.5 (21.4)	98.1 (36.7)
Mean daily maximum °F (°C)	50.5 (10.3)	55.3 (12.9)	63.9 (17.7)	73.4 (23.0)	80.8 (27.1)	87.2 (30.7)	90.0 (32.2)	89.2 (31.8)	84.3 (29.1)	73.9 (23.3)	62.1 (16.7)	53.7 (12.1)	72.0 (22.2)
Daily mean °F (°C)	39.2 (4.0)	43.2 (6.2)	50.6 (10.3)	58.7 (14.8)	67.5 (19.7)	75.0 (23.9)	78.1 (25.6)	76.9 (24.9)	70.7 (21.5)	59.3 (15.2)	48.4 (9.1)	42.4 (5.8)	59.2 (15.1)
Mean daily minimum °F (°C)	27.9 (−2.3)	31.2 (−0.4)	37.3 (2.9)	44.0 (6.7)	54.1 (12.3)	62.7 (17.1)	66.2 (19.0)	64.6 (18.1)	57.2 (14.0)	44.7 (7.1)	34.7 (1.5)	31.0 (−0.6)	46.3 (8.0)
Mean minimum °F (°C)	9.0 (−12.8)	16.1 (−8.8)	22.0 (−5.6)	29.6 (−1.3)	38.5 (3.6)	52.2 (11.2)	57.5 (14.2)	55.7 (13.2)	44.0 (6.7)	29.2 (−1.6)	20.0 (−6.7)	16.7 (−8.5)	8.1 (−13.3)
Record low °F (°C)	−9 (−23)	−15 (−26)	3 (−16)	19 (−7)	31 (−1)	41 (5)	47 (8)	51 (11)	31 (−1)	22 (−6)	11 (−12)	3 (−16)	−15 (−26)
Average precipitation inches (mm)	4.63 (118)	4.86 (123)	4.91 (125)	4.80 (122)	4.92 (125)	4.48 (114)	5.34 (136)	4.14 (105)	4.08 (104)	3.15 (80)	4.76 (121)	5.18 (132)	55.25 (1,405)
Average snowfall inches (cm)	1.0 (2.5)	1.3 (3.3)	0.3 (0.76)	0.0 (0.0)	0.0 (0.0)	0.0 (0.0)	0.0 (0.0)	0.0 (0.0)	0.0 (0.0)	0.0 (0.0)	0.1 (0.25)	0.1 (0.25)	2.8 (7.06)
Average precipitation days (≥ 0.01 in)	8.7	10.3	9.4	8.6	9.6	9.9	11.6	9.5	7.0	6.3	7.5	10.0	108.4
Average snowy days (≥ 0.1 in)	0.8	0.6	0.2	0.0	0.0	0.0	0.0	0.0	0.0	0.0	0.1	0.0	1.7
Source 1: NOAA
Source 2: National Weather Service

== Demographics ==
Historical population
Census	Pop.	Note	%±
1920	1,220		—
1930	902		−26.1%
1940	899		−0.3%
1950	833		−7.3%
1960	794		−4.7%
1970	773		−2.6%
1980	698		−9.7%
1990	657		−5.9%
2000	859		30.7%
2010	880		2.4%
2020	762		−13.4%

As of the census of 2000, there were 859 people, 393 households, and 227 families residing in the town. The population density was 549.8 people per square mile (212.3 people/km^{2}). There were 446 housing units at an average density of 285.5 per square mile (110.2/km^{2}). The racial makeup of the town was 96.74% White, 0.81% Native American, 0.81% Asian, 0.12% from other races, and 1.51% from two or more races. Hispanic or Latino of any race were 1.75% of the population.

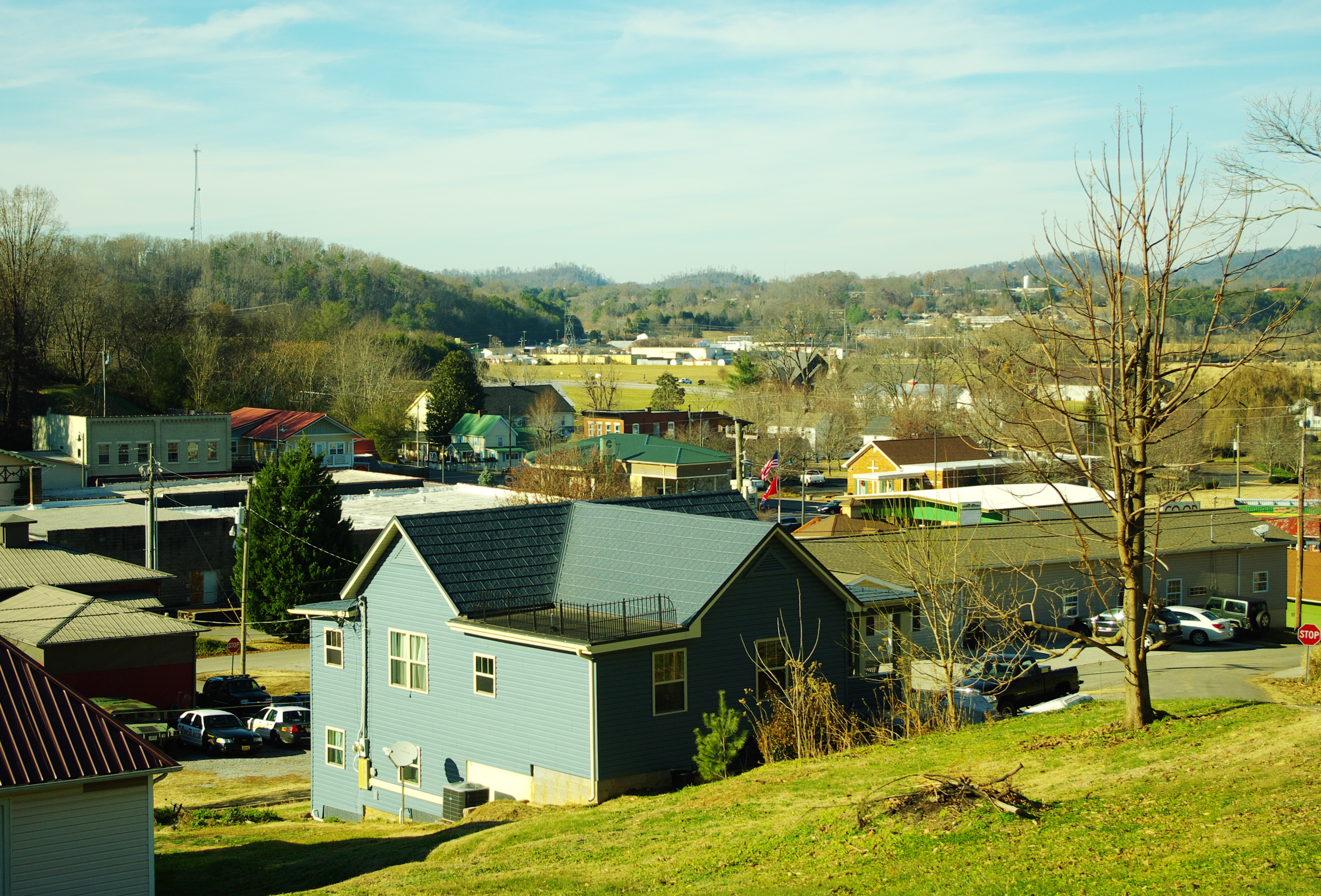
Tellico Plains, viewed from School Street

There were 393 households, out of which 27.7% had children under the age of 18 living with them, 41.5% were married couples living together, 12.7% had a female householder with no husband present, and 42.2% were non-families. 39.7% of all households were made up of individuals, and 17.3% had someone living alone who was 65 years of age or older. The average household size was 2.19 and the average family size was 2.92.

In the town, the population was spread out, with 22.9% under the age of 18, 8.5% from 18 to 24, 26.7% from 25 to 44, 26.9% from 45 to 64, and 15.0% who were 65 years of age or older. The median age was 39 years. For every 100 females, there were 95.2 males. For every 100 females age 18 and over, there were 91.9 males.

The median income for a household in the town was $18,750, and the median income for a family was $31,087. Males had a median income of $27,045 versus $18,333 for females. The per capita income for the town was $13,234. About 19.2% of families and 24.4% of the population were below the poverty line, including 25.2% of those under age 18 and 38.9% of those age 65 or over.

== Economy ==
Tellico Plains' economy is fueled by the Cherohala Skyway and the Cherokee National Forest.

== Notable people ==
- Bill Ervin (1932–1996), racing driver
- Josh Graves (1928-2006), American bluegrass musician
- Ray Jenkins (1897–1980), defense attorney
- Ebenezer Johnson (1786–1849), first Mayor of Buffalo, New York
- Mike Stratton (1941–2020), American football player
- Harry Stratton (1910–1972)
- Jill Wagner, actress
- Moytoy of Tellico (1687–1741)

== Schools ==
Monroe County Schools operates public schools.

- Tellico Plains High School
- Tellico Plains Junior High School
- Tellico Plains Elementary School
- Monroe County Christian Academy

Areas outside of Tellico Plains with Tellico Plains mailing addresses are served by:

- Rural Vale Elementary School
- Coker Creek Elementary School, Coker Creek
