= Unaka Range =

Mountain range in North Carolina and Tennessee, United States

Coordinates: 36°6′10″N 82°21′47″W

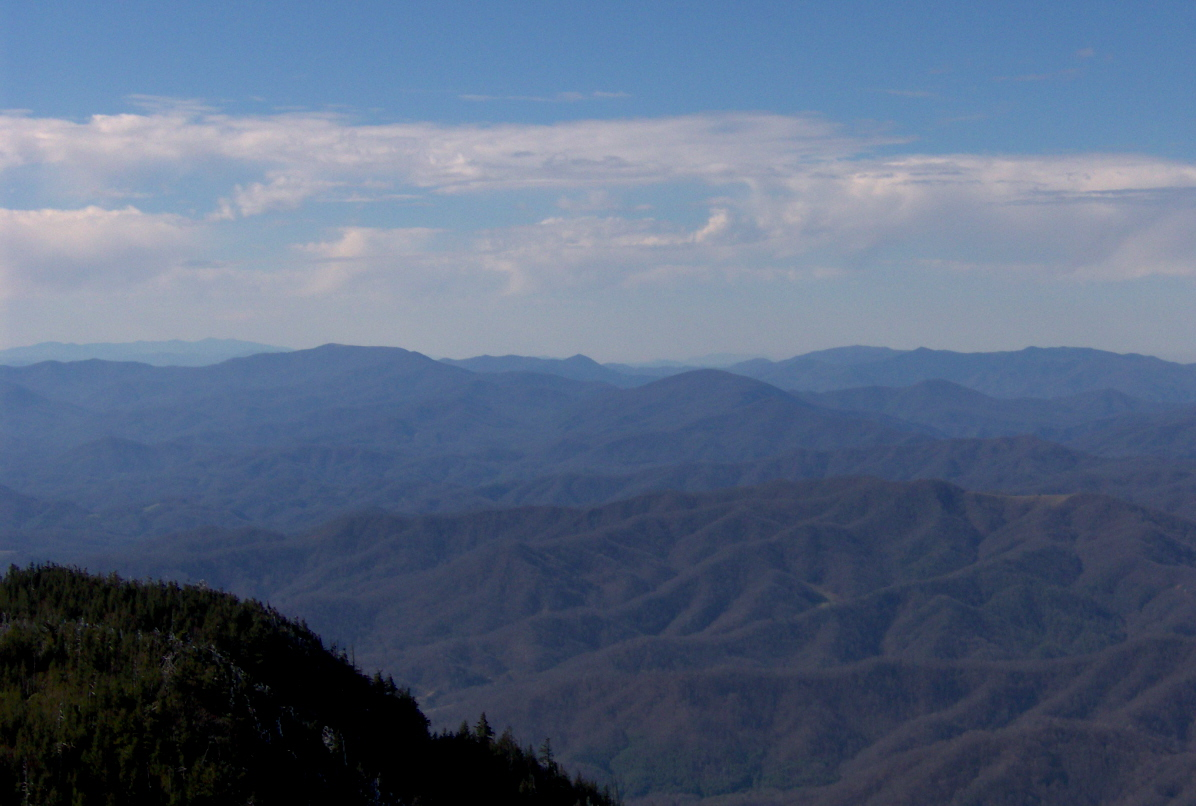
The Unaka Mountains

The Unaka Range is a mountain range on the border of Tennessee and North Carolina, in the southeastern United States. It is a subrange of the Appalachian Mountains and is part of the Blue Ridge Mountains physiographic province. The Unakas stretch approximately from the Nolichucky River in the south to the Watauga River in the north.

== Geology, geography and history ==
The Unakas include the prominent Roan Highlands, where several summits rise above 6,000 feet. The Iron Mountains border the Unakas to the north, and the Bald Mountains border the Unakas opposite the Nolichucky to the south. The name unaka is rooted in the Cherokee term unega, meaning "white". Common lore is that 1 in 4 trees in the Unaka Range were American Chestnut trees prior to the great Chestnut Blight. Because the chestnut had long white blossoms, the Unaka Mountains turned white in color during the spring blossoming of the chestnut trees. They were called the White mountains by the local Cherokee.

The Cherokee National Forest and the Pisgah National Forest protect large sections of the Unaka Mountains. The Appalachian Trail traverses the Unaka crest.

In some geological and historical sources, the term "Unaka Range" is used to identify the entire crest of the Appalachian Mountains along the Tennessee-North Carolina border, including the Unakas, the Great Smoky Mountains, the Bald Mountains, the Unicoi Mountains, and the mountains in the Big Frog Wilderness and Little Frog Mountain Wilderness. The range also extends into Georgia, where it is known as the Cohutta Mountains which when combined with the Big Frog Wilderness, this creates one of the largest patches of roadless wilderness areas east of the Mississippi River.

Unakite was first discovered in the Unaka Range, and was named after it.

== Unaka Mountain Wilderness ==
Established in 1986 by the U.S. Congress, the Unaka Mountain Wilderness is part of the National Wilderness Preservation System. The 4,472 acre wilderness area is managed by the United States Forest Service.

== Notable peaks ==
The highest point in the Unaka Range is Roan High Knob, which rises to an elevation of 6,285 feet (1,916 m).

| Peak Name | Elevation (ft) | Land | North Carolina | Tennessee counties | Prominence | Isolation |
|---|---|---|---|---|---|---|
| Roan High Knob | 6,285 | Cherokee/Pisgah | Mitchell | Carter | 3,485 | 18.81 |
| Roan High Bluff | 6,178 | Pisgah | Mitchell | | 187 | 1.54 |
| Cloudland Mountain | 6,267 | Cherokee/Pisgah | Mitchell | Carter | | |
| Grassy Ridge Bald | 6,189 | Pisgah | Avery, Mitchell | | 688 | 2.35 |
| Round Bald | 5,807 | Cherokee/Pisgah | Mitchell | Carter | | |
| Jane Bald | 5,807 | Cherokee/Pisgah | Mitchell | Carter | | |
| Hump Mountain | 5,587 | Pisgah | Avery | | | |
| Little Yellow Mountain | 5,504 | Pisgah | Avery, Mitchell | | | |
| Hawk Mountain | 5,443 | Pisgah | Mitchell | | | |
| Big Yellow Mountain | 5,440 | Pisgah | Avery | | | |
