= Big Frog Mountain =

Mountain in Tennessee and Georgia, United States

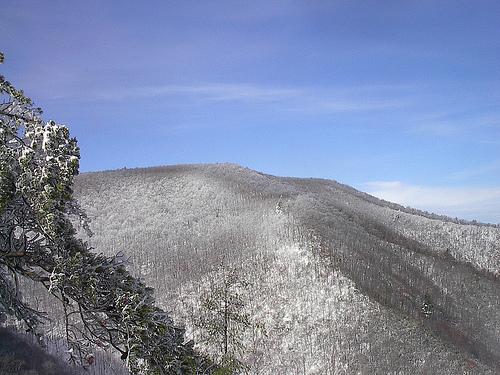
- Big Frog Mountain in the winter from the Licklog Ridge Trail in Big Frog Wilderness.

Highest point
- Elevation: 4,224 ft (1,287 m)
- Prominence: 2,480 ft (760 m)
- Coordinates: 34°59′58″N 84°31′46″W

Geography
- Location within Tennessee
- Location: Polk County, Tennessee, Fannin County, Georgia, United States
- Parent range: Blue Ridge Mountains

Big Frog Mountain is a mountain located primarily in southeastern Tennessee in the Big Frog Wilderness, within the Cherokee National Forest. It is located within the Blue Ridge Mountains, part of the Appalachian Mountains. At an elevation of 4,224 feet (1,287 m), there is no higher point west of Big Frog Mountain until the Big Bend in Texas or the Black Hills of South Dakota.

== Geography ==
Most of Big Frog Mountain, including its summit, is located in Polk County, Tennessee, which is also the highest point in that county. Part of the mountain south of the summit is located in Fannin County, Georgia. It is located on the divide between the Tennessee and Coosa basins. A network of trails allow hikers to explore the mountain, which gains its distinctive name by, according to some, looking somewhat like a frog in profile. It has also been speculated that the local place name "Cohutta" derived from a Cherokee word meaning "Big Frog"

Big Frog Mountain has a long, narrow, and flat top rising gently to a maximum height of 4,224 feet (1,287 m). Large patches of rhododendron can be found on the western part of the mountaintop.
