= Bald River Gorge Wilderness =

Protected area in Tennessee, United States

- IUCN category Ib (wilderness area)
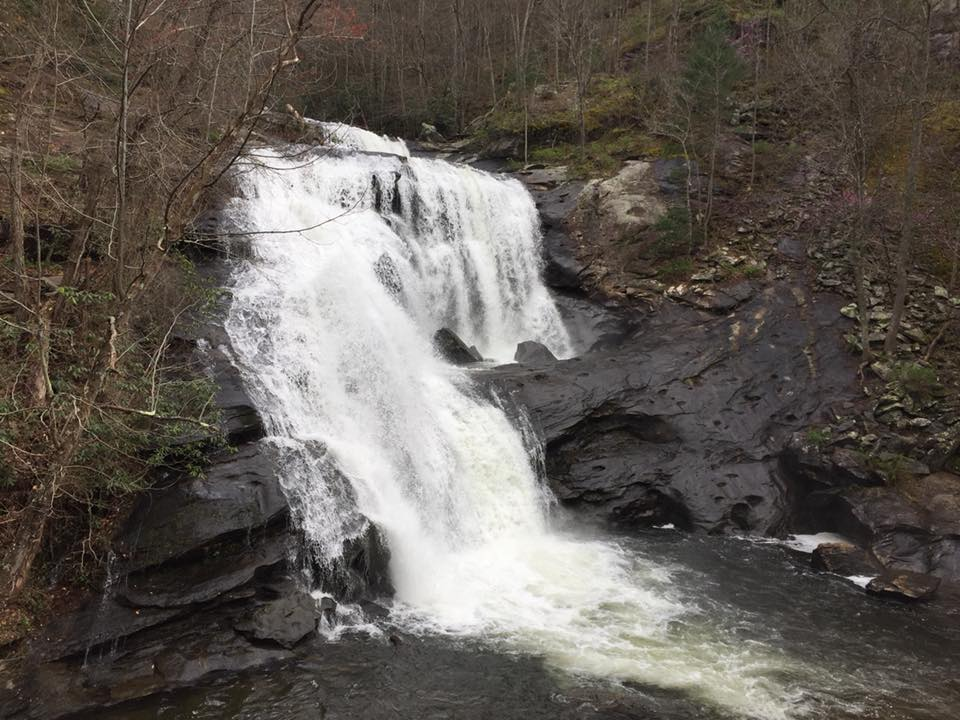
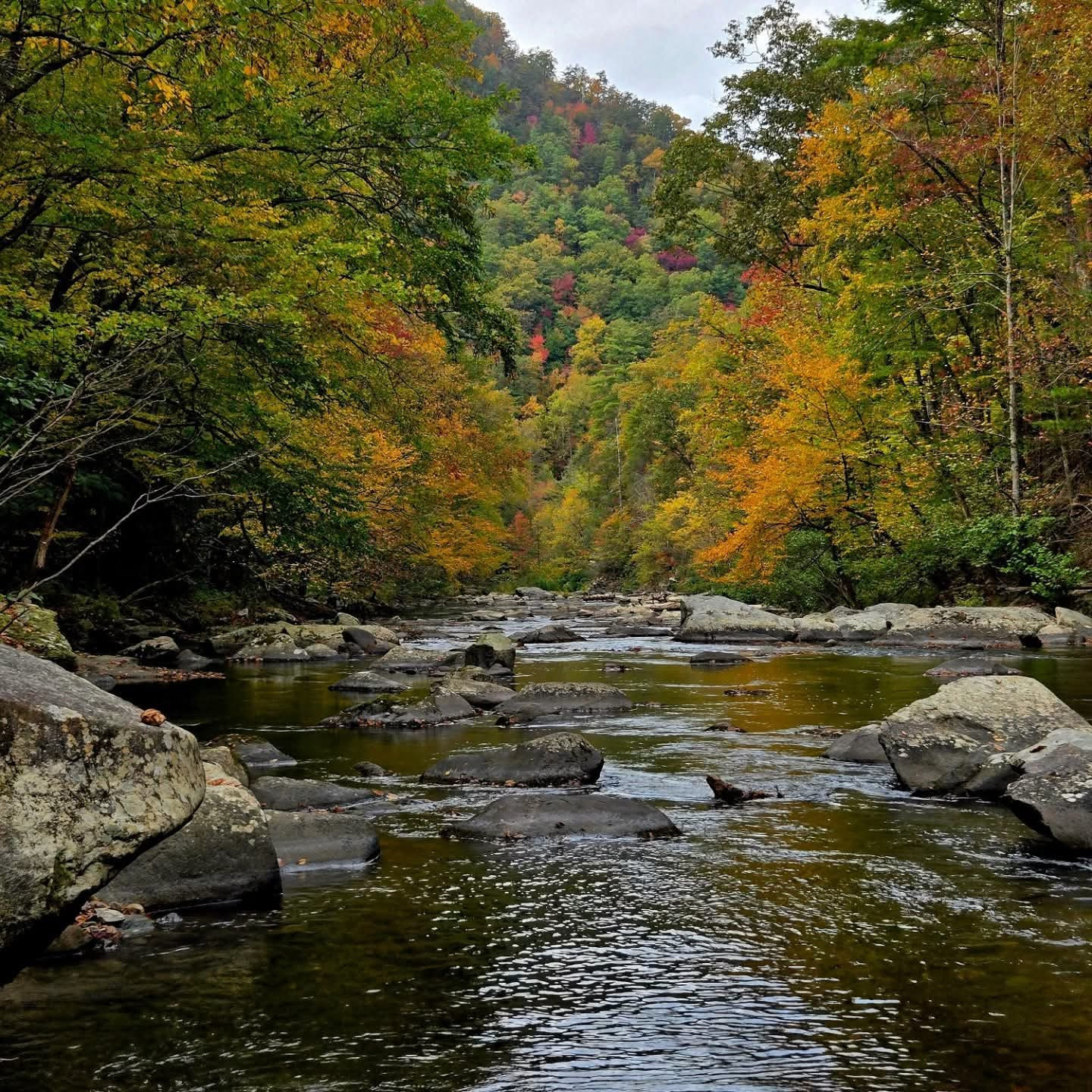
- Bald River Falls Bald River Gorge stream Bald River Falls

- Location within Tennessee Location within the United States
- Location: Monroe County, Tennessee
- Nearest city: Madisonville, Tennessee
- Coordinates: 35.30722°N 84.17222°W
- Area: 3,721 ha (14.37 sq mi)
- Designated: 1984
- Operator: United States Forest Service

Bald River Gorge Wilderness is a 3,721-acre (15 km^{2}) wilderness area of Cherokee National Forest that lies within Monroe County in the U.S. state of Tennessee, designated in 1984. Its elevation is 2,642 feet (805 m) above sea level. It is administered by the United States Forest Service.
