= Yellow Mountain (Montana) =

Mountain in the state of Montana

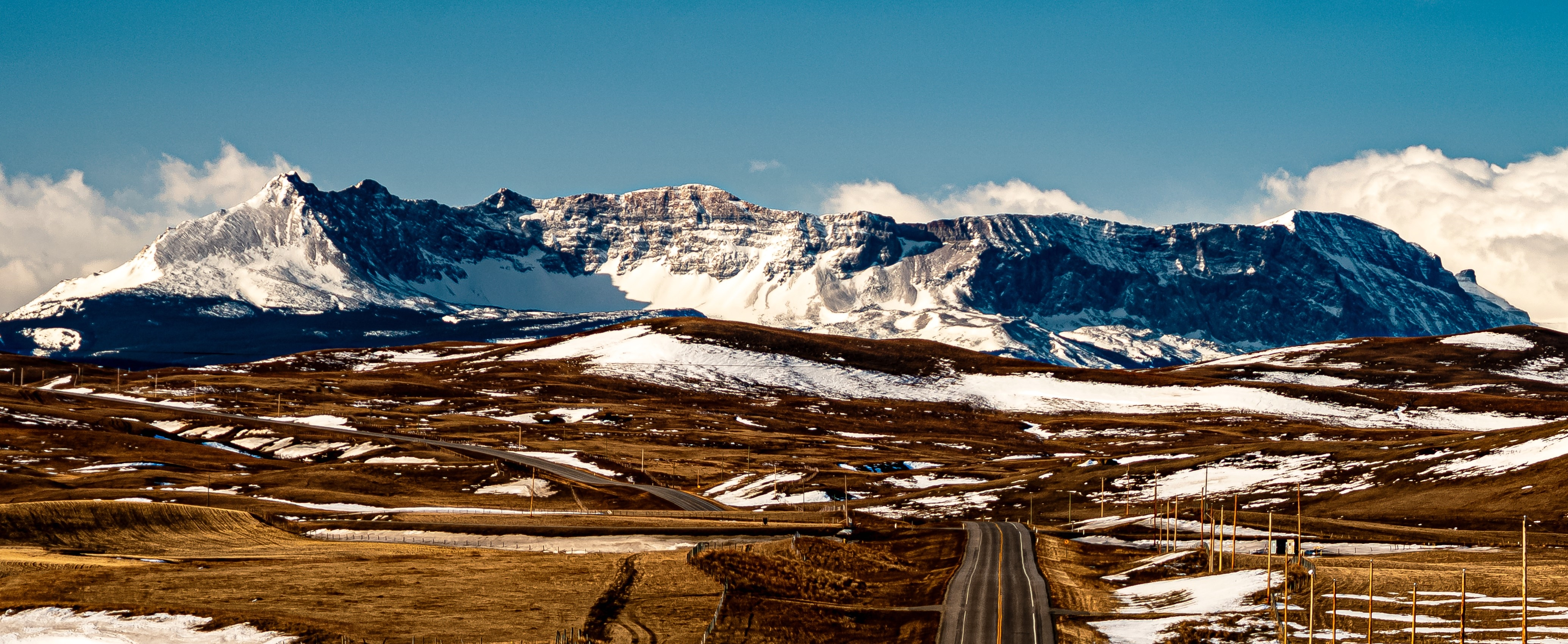
- North aspect

Highest point
- Elevation: 8,971 ft (2,734 m)
- Prominence: 1,006 ft (307 m)
- Coordinates: 48°52′54″N 113°38′15″W

Geography
- Location within Montana Location within the United States
- Location: Glacier County, Montana, U.S.
- Parent range: Lewis Range
- Topo map(s): USGS Chief Mountain, MT

Yellow Mountain (8,971 feet (2,734 m)) is located in the Lewis Range, Glacier National Park in the U.S. state of Montana. Yellow Mountain forms a high ridge and connects Sherburne Peak in the east to Seward Mountain to the west.

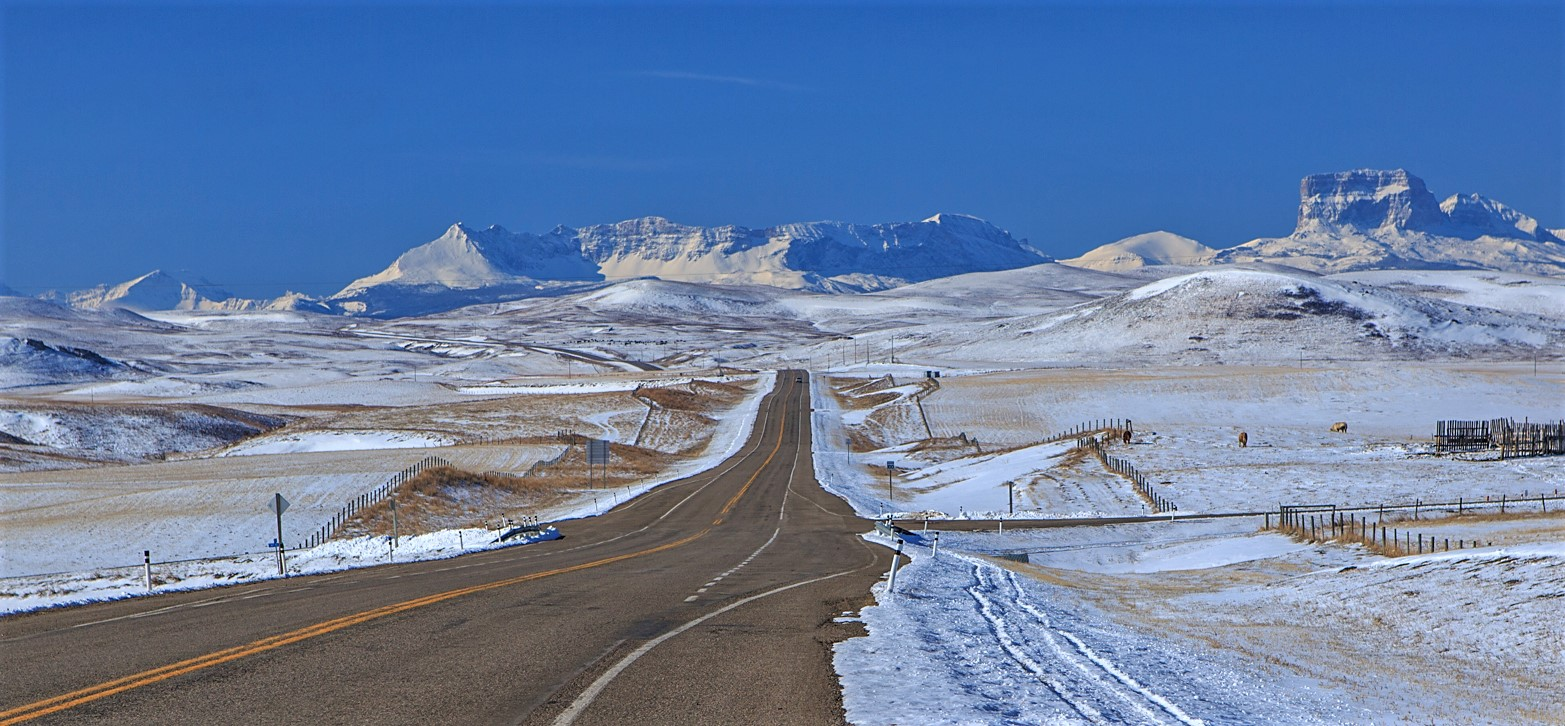
Yellow Mountain is centered. Chief Mountain to the right. Camera is pointed south.

== See also ==
- Mountains and mountain ranges of Glacier National Park (U.S.)
