= Big Frog Wilderness =

Protected area in southeast Tennessee

- IUCN category Ib (wilderness area)
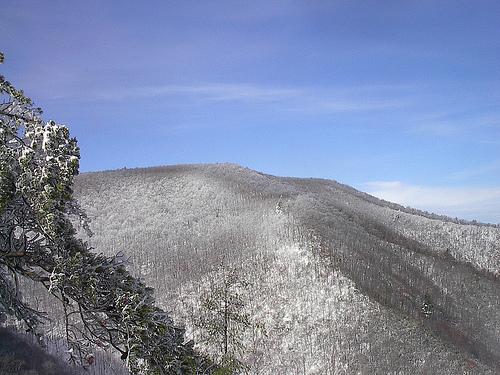

- Location within the United States
- Location: Polk County, Tennessee / Fannin County, Georgia, USA
- Nearest city: McCaysville, Georgia
- Coordinates: 34°59′37″N 84°32′30″W
- Area: 8,082 acres (33 km^{2})
- Established: 1984
- Governing body: U.S. Forest Service

The Big Frog Wilderness was designated in 1984 and currently consists of 8,082 acres (32.71 km^{2}). Approximately 89 acres (360,000 m^{2}) are located in Georgia in the Chattahoochee National Forest and approximately 7,993 acres (32 km^{2}) are located in Tennessee in the Cherokee National Forest. The Wilderness is managed by the United States Forest Service in Tennessee and is part of the National Wilderness Preservation System.

The highest elevation in the Big Frog Wilderness is the 4,224-foot (1,287 m) peak of Big Frog Mountain in Tennessee. Although not a high mountain, Big Frog seems to dominate the Wilderness because it stands alone. The Wilderness borders the Cohutta Wilderness, which is located in Georgia. The Georgia portion of the Big Frog Wilderness is the smallest wilderness area in Georgia.

== See also ==
- List of U.S. Wilderness Areas
- Wilderness Act
