= Big Yellow Mountain =

Mountain in North Carolina, United States

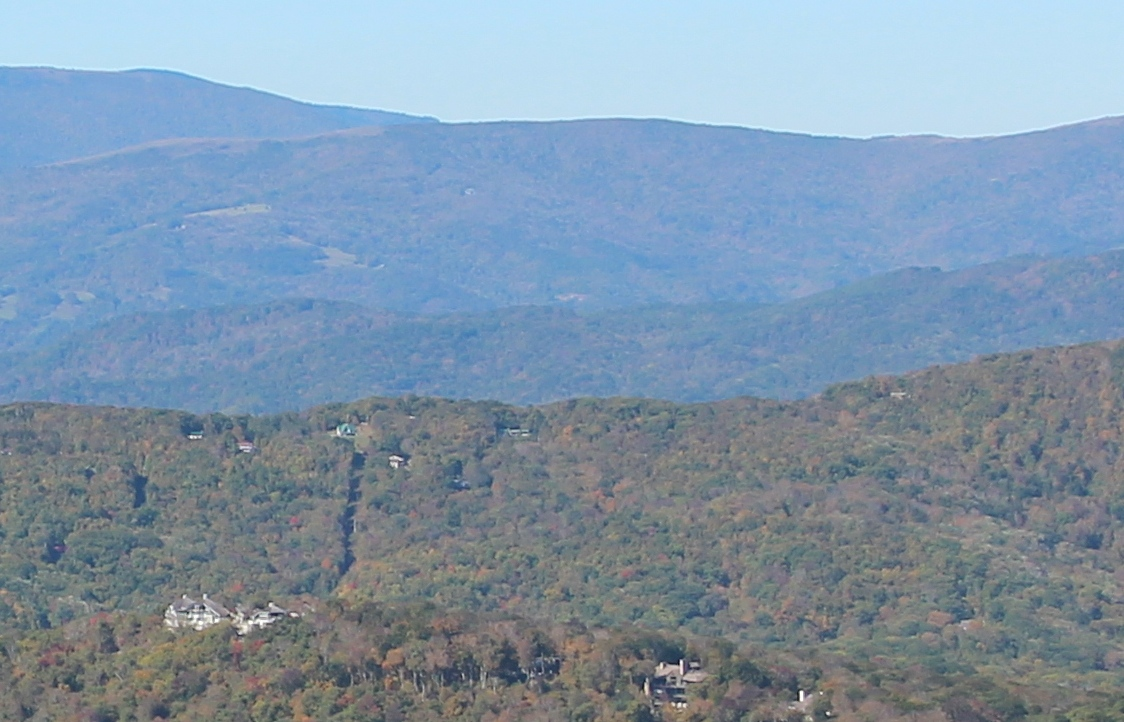
- Big Yellow Mountain seen from Grandfather Mountain

Highest point
- Elevation: 5,443 ft (1,659 m)
- Prominence: 240 ft (73 m)
- Coordinates: 36°06′36″N 82°01′37″W

Geography
- Location within North Carolina
- Location: Avery County, North Carolina, U.S.
- Parent range: Unaka Mountains; Blue Ridge Mountains
- Topo map: USGS Carvers Gap

Big Yellow Mountain is a mountain in the North Carolina High Country and wholly in the Pisgah National Forest. Its elevation reaches 5,443 feet (1,659 m). The mountain generates feeder streams for the North Toe River.

Though named Big Yellow Mountain, it is actually 64 ft (20 m) lower than nearby Little Yellow Mountain.

== See also ==
- List of mountains in North Carolina
