= Grassy Ridge Bald =

Mountain in North Carolina, US

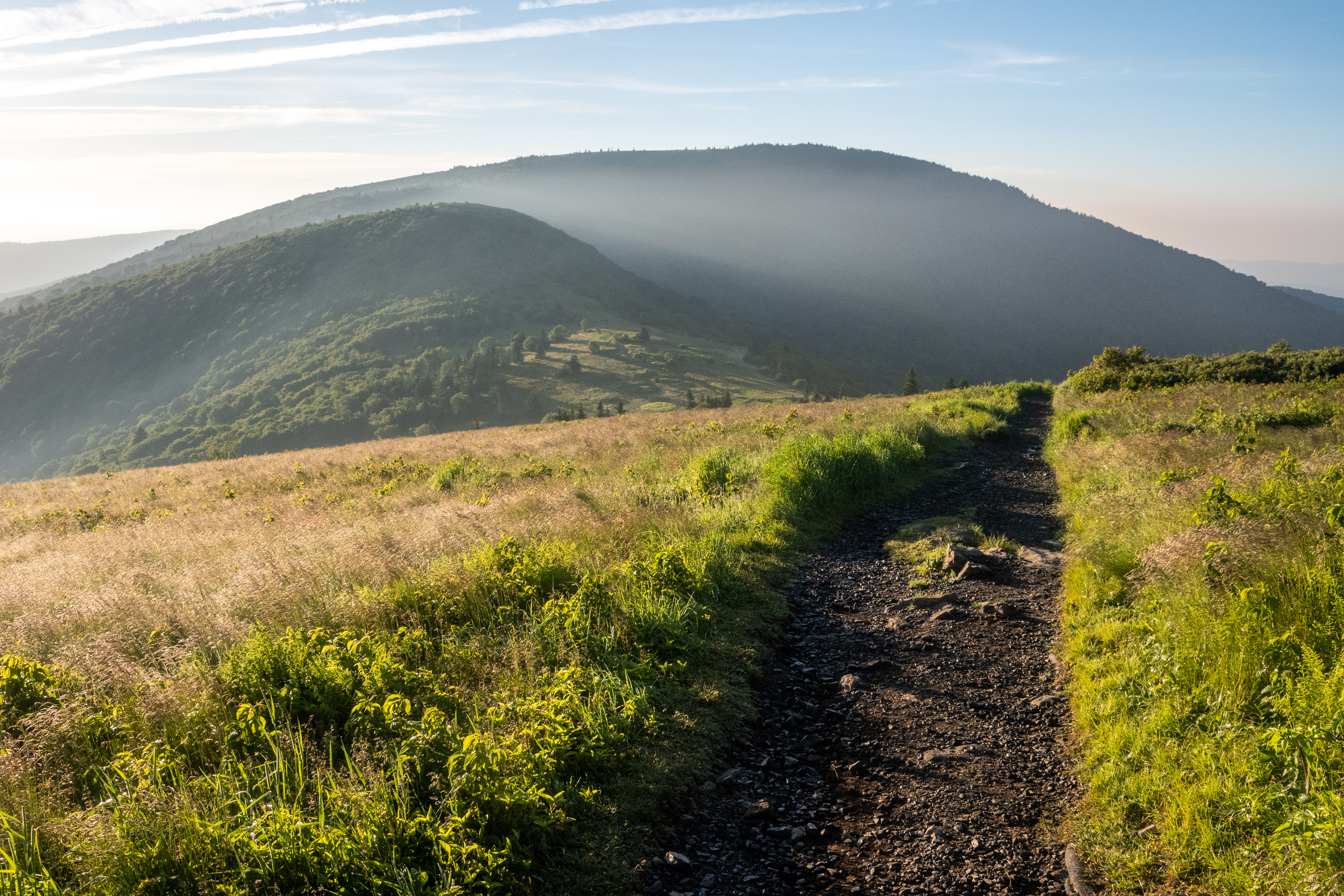
- Grassy Ridge Bald viewed from the Appalachian Trail on Round Bald

Highest point
- Elevation: 6,184 ft (1,885 m)
- Prominence: 688 ft (210 m)
- Parent peak: Roan High Knob
- Coordinates: 36°05′59″N 82°04′49″W

Geography
- Location: Avery & Mitchell counties North Carolina, U.S.
- Parent range: Unaka Mountains; Blue Ridge Mountains
- Topo map: USGS Carvers Gap

Climbing
- Easiest route: Hike

Grassy Ridge Bald is a bald mountain in North Carolina and is part of the Roan Highlands, within the Pisgah National Forest. Its elevation reaches 6,184 feet (1,885 m) and it lies on the boundary between Avery County, North Carolina (its highest point) and Mitchell County, North Carolina. The mountain forms feeder streams for the North Toe River.

== See also ==
- List of mountains in North Carolina
