= Little Yellow Mountain (North Carolina) =

Mountain in North Carolina, United States

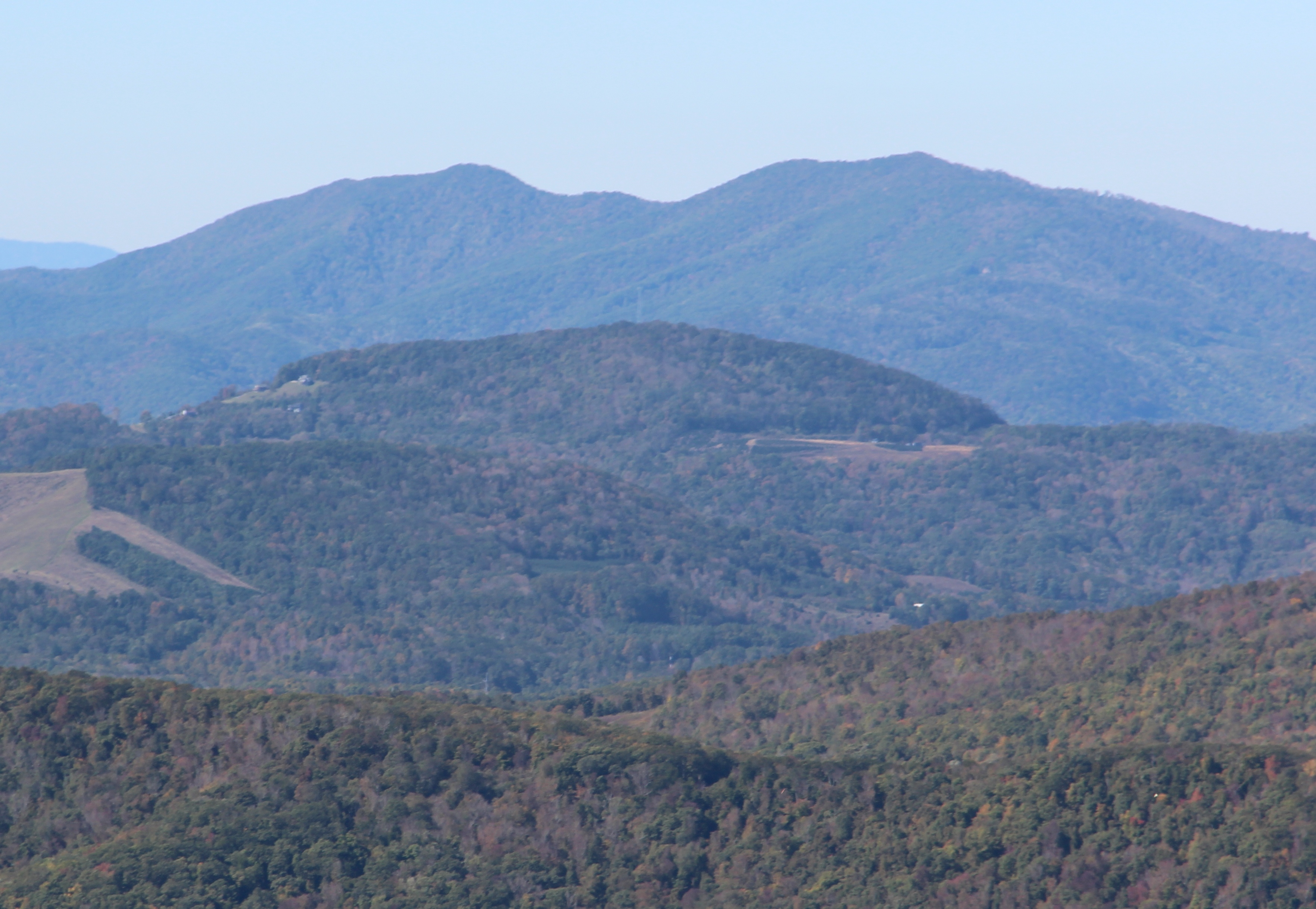
- Hawk Mountain (left) and Little Yellow Mountain (right) seen from Grandfather Mountain

Highest point
- Elevation: 5,504 ft (1,678 m)
- Prominence: 651 ft (198 m)
- Coordinates: 36°03′55″N 82°04′07″W

Geography
- Location within North Carolina
- Location: Avery / Mitchell counties, North Carolina, U.S.
- Parent range: Unaka Mountains; Blue Ridge Mountains
- Topo map: USGS Carvers Gap

Little Yellow Mountain is a mountain in the North Carolina High Country and wholly in the Pisgah National Forest. Its elevation reaches 5,504 ft (1,678 m), it is on the border between Avery and Mitchell counties. The mountain generates feeder streams for the North Toe River.

Though named Little Yellow Mountain, it is actually 64 ft (20 m) taller than nearby Big Yellow Mountain.

On December 3, 2009, the Nature Conservancy announced the acquisition of 466 acres (1.89 km^{2}) at the summit of Little Yellow Mountain. The future goal is to transfer the land to the North Carolina State Parks System, becoming part of the Yellow Mountain State Natural Area.

== Macon County ==
There is also a Little Yellow Mountain in Macon County, North Carolina with an elevation of 4,249 ft (1,295 m).

== See also ==
- List of mountains in North Carolina
