= Cherokee National Forest =

National forest in Tennessee and North Carolina, U.S.

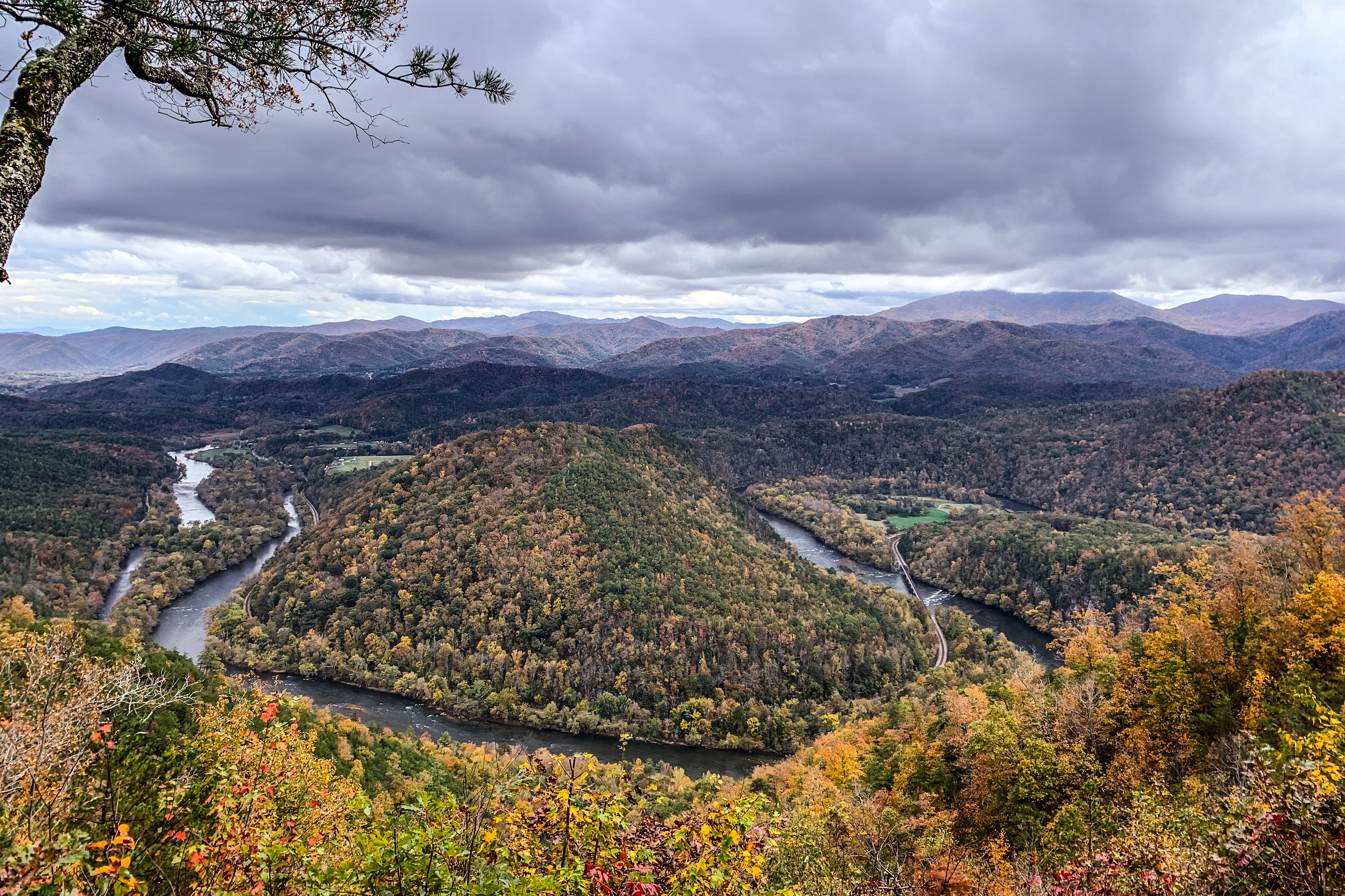
- Chimney Rocks overlooking the French Broad River in Cherokee National Forest

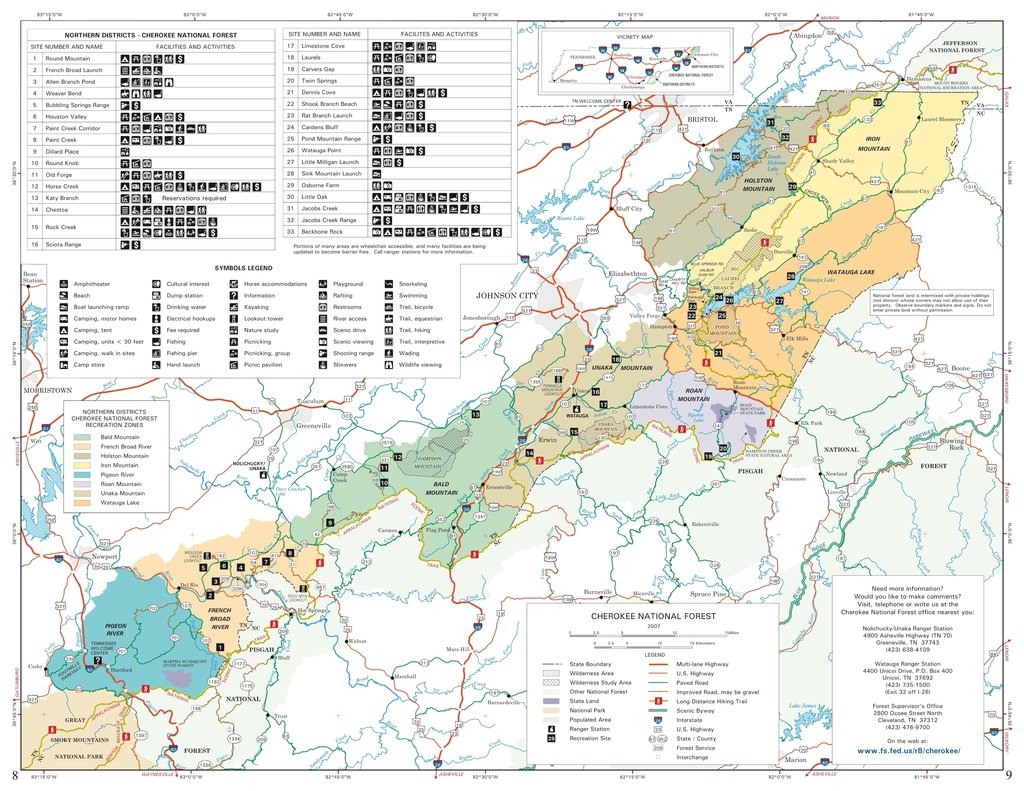
- United States Forest Service issued map of Cherokee National Forest
- Location: Polk, Monroe, Carter, Unicoi, Cocke, Johnson, Greene, Sullivan, Washington and McMinn counties in Tennessee, and Ashe County, North Carolina, United States
- Nearest city: Elizabethton, Johnson City, Newport
- Coordinates: 36°29′N 82°05′W
- Area: 655,598 acres (2,653.11 km^{2})
- Established: June 14, 1920
- Visitors: 2,875,000 (in 2017)
- Governing body: United States Forest Service (USFS)
- Website: Cherokee National Forest

The Cherokee National Forest is a United States National Forest located in the U.S. states of Tennessee and North Carolina that was created on June 14, 1920. The forest is maintained and managed by the United States Forest Service. It encompasses an estimated area of 655,598 acres (2,653.11 km^{2}).

== Location ==
The Cherokee National Forest headquarters are located in Cleveland, Tennessee. The Cherokee National Forest mostly lies within eastern Tennessee, along the border with North Carolina, and comprises nearly the entire border area except for sections within the Great Smoky Mountains National Park and the Copper Basin. The Cherokee National Forest has two separate sections: a northern region to the northeast of the Great Smoky Mountains National Park and a southern section to the southwest of the Smokies. The southern section comprises much of the Unicoi Mountains.

The Cherokee National Forest contains such notable sites as the Ocoee River (site of the 1996 Olympic whitewater events); 150 miles (240 km) of the Appalachian Trail; Citico Creek Wilderness; Big Frog Mountain within Big Frog Wilderness, and surrounds both the Tennessee Valley Authority Watauga Reservoir and Wilbur Reservoir.

The forest is located in parts of ten counties in Tennessee and one county in North Carolina. In descending order of forestland area they are Polk, Monroe, Carter, Unicoi, Cocke, Johnson, Greene, Sullivan, Washington and McMinn counties in Tennessee and Ashe County in North Carolina.

== Wildlife ==
The forest is home to mammalian species such as black bear, raccoon, coyote, skunk, opossum, beaver, two species of squirrel, bobcat, chipmunk, river otter, two species of fox, woodchuck, and white-tailed deer.

Birdwatchers commonly view species of juncos, mourning doves, chimney swifts, eastern phoebes, barn swallows, blue jays, indigo buntings, cardinals, towhees, sparrows, chickadees, and warblers. Raptors include turkey vultures, hawks, eagles, and peregrine falcons.

Reptiles include timber rattlesnake, northern copperhead, eastern box turtle, common snapping turtle, and southeastern five-lined skink. Amphibians of frogs, toads, and salamanders are all common residents. Notable species of salamander include Jordan's salamander and hellbender.

== Recreation ==
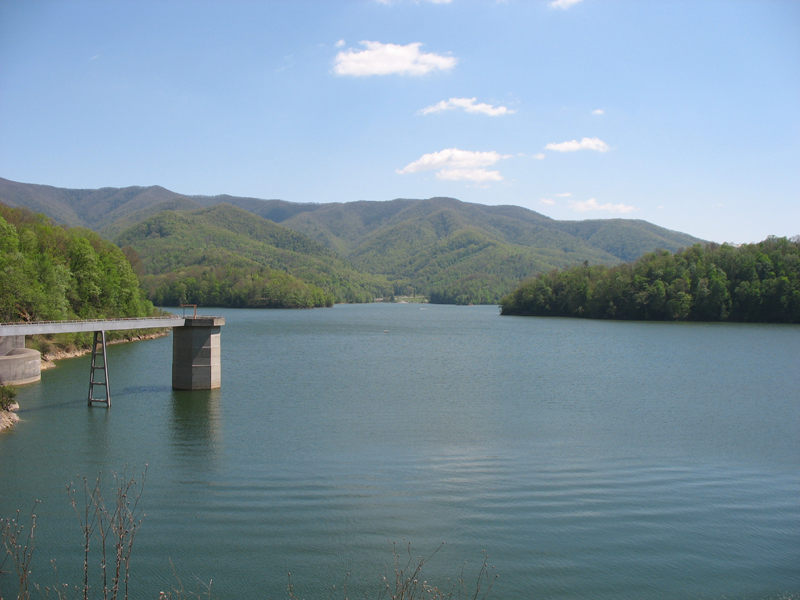
The Cherokee National Forest at Watauga Lake.

Recreation opportunities in the Cherokee National Forest are diverse. The forest's fast-flowing rivers support trout fishing. Rainbow trout are stocked in many streams and rivers. Brook trout and brown trout are also present. Bass, bluegill and crappie are found in the forest's lakes, which are also open to wind surfing, water skiing and boating.

Trails criss-cross the forest. In addition to the Appalachian Trail, these include the John Muir Recreation trail, other hiking trails, and some trails designed for equestrian use. Bicycle trails are being developed. Camping is available in RV campgrounds and tent-only camping areas, and primitive tent camping is allowed throughout much of the forest.

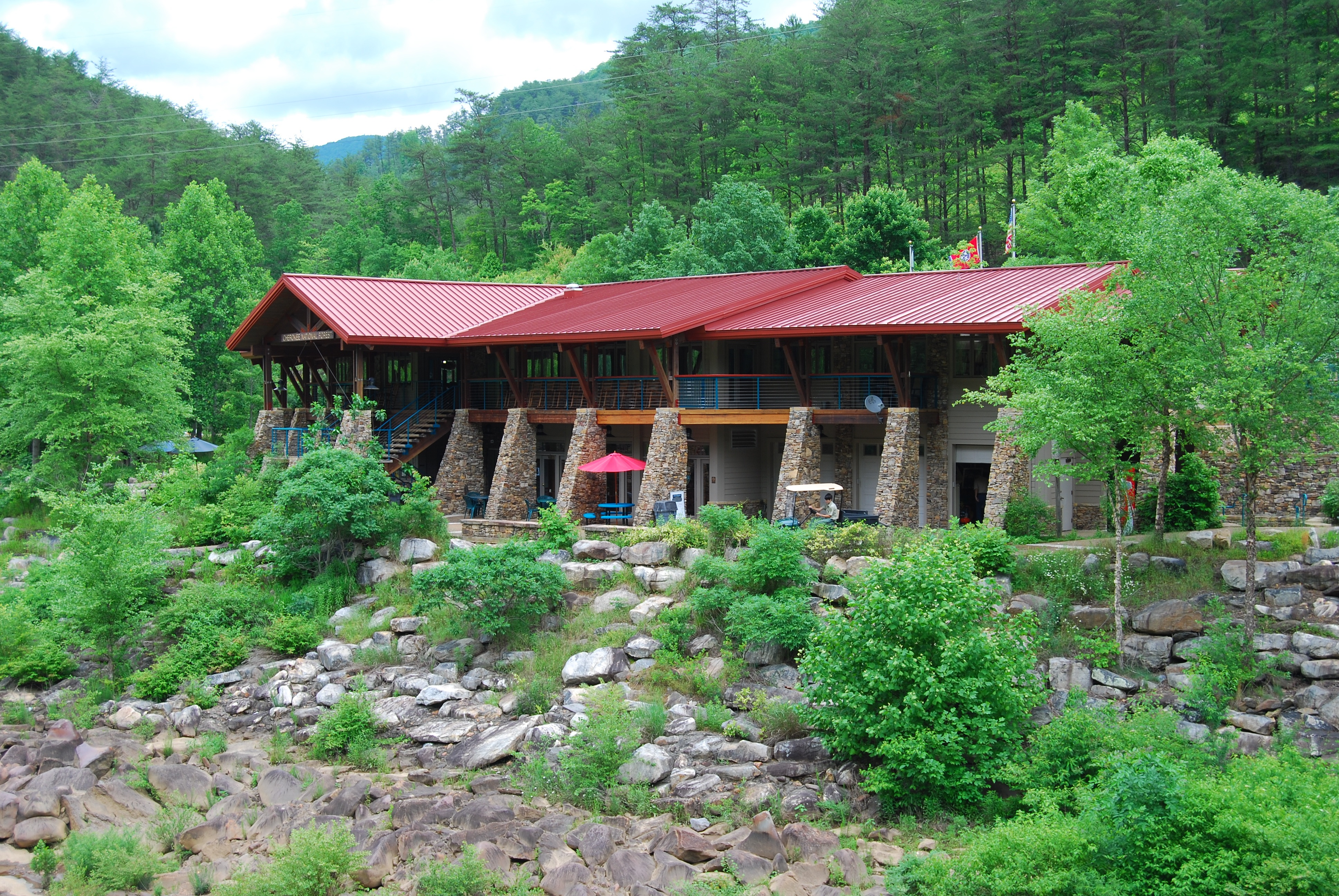
Ocoee Whitewater Center from the 1996 Summer Olympics, now operated by the U.S. Forest Service in support of hiking, mountain biking, conferences, weddings, and receptions

== Wilderness areas ==
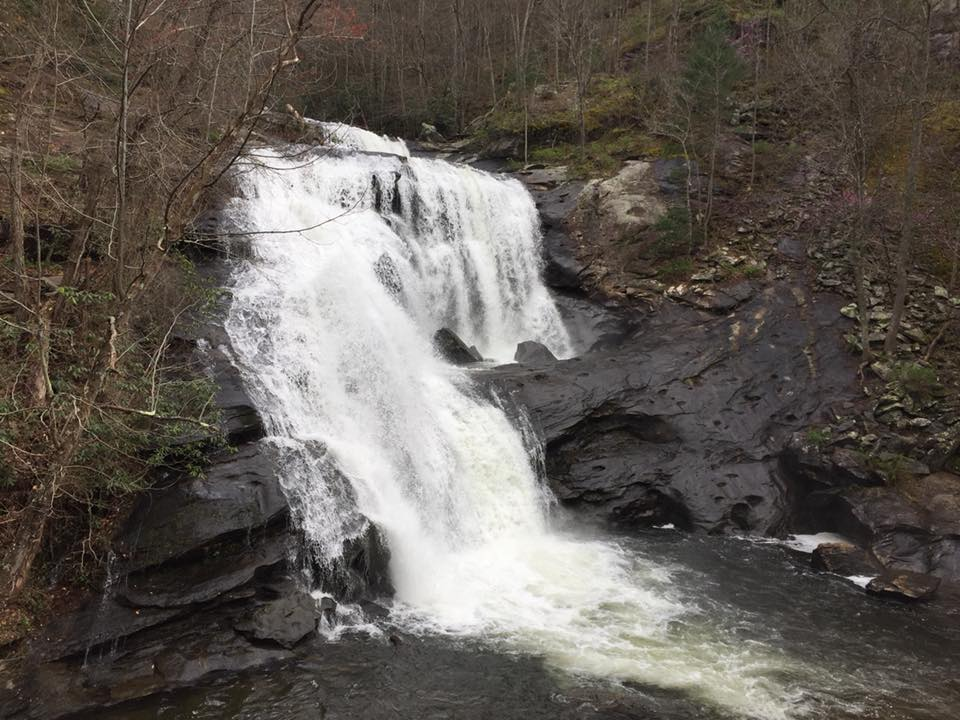
Bald River Falls

There are eleven official wilderness areas in Cherokee National Forest, which are all part of the National Wilderness Preservation System. Three of these extend into neighboring National Forests (and also into neighboring states, where the forest changes names):

- Bald River Gorge Wilderness
- Big Frog Wilderness (Cherokee NF in Tennessee and Chattahoochee NF in Georgia)
- Big Laurel Branch Wilderness
- Citico Creek Wilderness
- Cohutta Wilderness (Chattahoochee NF in Georgia and Cherokee NF in Tennessee)
- Gee Creek Wilderness
- Joyce Kilmer-Slickrock Wilderness (Nantahala NF in North Carolina and Cherokee NF in Tennessee)
- Little Frog Mountain Wilderness
- Pond Mountain Wilderness
- Sampson Mountain Wilderness
- Unaka Mountain Wilderness

== See also ==
- List of national forests of the United States
- Bald River
- Tennessee State Route 67
- Watauga River
