= Commercial Building (disambiguation) =

A commercial building is a building used for commercial purposes. It may also refer to:

- Commercial Building (South Bend, Indiana)
- Commercial Building (Alexandria, Louisiana)
- Commercial Building (Natchez, Mississippi)
- Commercial Building at 32 West Bridge Street, Catskill, New York
- Commercial Building at 500 North Tryon Street, Charlotte, North Carolina
- Commercial Building (Dayton, Ohio)
- Commercial Building (Elyria, Ohio)
- Governor's Inn, also known as the "Commercial Building"
- Commercial Building at 4113 Guadalupe Street, Austin, Texas
