= Eastover =

Eastover may refer to:

== Places in the United Kingdom ==
- Eastover, Somerset, an area of Bridgwater

== Places in the United States ==
- Eastover Surry County, Virginia
- Eastover (Manalapan, Florida)
- Eastover Country Club, New Orleans, LA
- Eastover, North Carolina
- Eastover (Salisbury, North Carolina), listed on the National Register of Historic Places in Rowan County, North Carolina
- Eastover, South Carolina
