= First National Bank of Charlotte =

First National Bank of Charlotte was a bank located in Charlotte, North Carolina from 1865 until 1930.

== Early history ==
In 1853, John Wilkes, the son of Admiral Charles Wilkes, moved to Charlotte to supervise his family's mining and milling business. He served under the Confederacy during the Civil War, but he was pardoned by President Andrew Johnson and Secretary of State William Seward. Soon after the end of the war, Wilkes started the first national bank in the South after the war. By December 15, 1865, Wilkes had received $500,000 in U.S. bonds. The same year, First National Bank became the only North Carolina bank printing National Bank Notes.

This bank played a major role in Charlotte's growth, as did the city's railroad access to other areas. Rufus Y. McAden, founder of the mills and mill village that became McAdenville, succeeded Wilkes as bank president in 1867. Robert M. Oates became president in 1891, and McAden's son Henry M. McAden served as president from 1907 until the bank's failure in 1930.

== Later years ==
Rufus McAden and his family actually lived in the bank's three-story building on South Tryon Street. His son demolished the building in 1925 and chose Louis Asbury, a leading Charlotte architect who had designed Henry's Myers Park home in 1916, to design what became the second tallest building in the state. The opening of the 250-foot, 21-story building, built at a cost of $1.8 million, was announced September 9, 1927, and The Charlotte News proclaimed Charlotte's strength as a banking center.

Later in 1927, the Federal Reserve opened its branch office on the building's nineteenth floor. This showed Charlotte appeared likely to become a major banking center. However, three years after it opened, the building was only 30 percent occupied. The bank would not rent to just anyone, unlike the nearby Johnston Building.

== Failure ==
On December 4, 1930, First National Bank announced it was closed. One reason given for the bank's failure was the ambitious building program, combined with the inability to make money from the new skyscraper. At the time, First National had only $1.6 million in deposits, the least of seven commercial banks in the city.
