= Louis H. Asbury =

American architect (1877–1975)

Louis H. Asbury (1877–1975) was an American architect, a leading architect of Charlotte, North Carolina. He is asserted to be the "first professionally trained, fulltime architect in North Carolina who was born and practiced in the state."

A number of his works are listed on the U.S. National Register of Historic Places.

== Works ==
- 112 Tryon Plaza
- First National Bank of Charlotte
- Cedar Grove Lutheran Church, 1220 Cedar Grove Rd., Batesburg-Leesville, South Carolina (Asbury, Louis H.), NRHP-listed
- Cliffside Public School, 1 N. Main St., Cliffside, North Carolina (Asbury, Louis Humbert Sr.), NRHP-listed
- Commercial Building at 500 North Tryon Street, 500 N. Tryon St., Charlotte, North Carolina (Asbury, Louis), NRHP-listed
- Cool Springs High School, 382 W. Main St., Forest City, North Carolina (Asbury, Louis Humbert), NRHP-listed
- One or more works in Kenworth Historic District (Boundary Increase), roughly along Fifth St. SE, Fifth Ave. SE, third Avenue Dr. SE, and Second Ave. SE, Hickory, North Carolina (Asbury, Louis), NRHP-listed
- Thomas Marcellus Denning House, Albemarle, North Carolina (Asbury, Louis H.), NRHP-listed
- Eastover, Salisbury, North Carolina (Asbury, Louis H.), NRHP-listed
- Bishop John C. Kilgo House, 2100 The Plaza, Charlotte, North Carolina (Asbury, Louis H.), NRHP-listed
- Lenoir Grammar School, 506 Harper St., Lenoir, North Carolina (Asbury, Louis), NRHP-listed
- One or more works in Main Street Historic District, roughly bounded by Taylor, Court, Washington and W. Third Sts., Rutherfordton, North Carolina (Asbury, Louis H.), NRHP-listed
- Mecklenburg County Courthouse, E. Trade, Alexander, and E. 4th Sts., Charlotte, North Carolina (Asbury, Louis H.), NRHP-listed
- One or more works in Mount Pleasant Historic District, roughly W. and E. Franklin between N. Halifax and C and N and N. and S. Main Sts. between Boston and Broad Sts., Mount Pleasant, North Carolina (Asbury, Louis H.), NRHP-listed
- One or more works in North Union Street Historic District, roughly bounded by Peachtree Ave. NW, Church St. N, Cobran Ave. SW, and Georgia St. NW and Spring St. N, Concord, North Carolina (Asbury, Louis H.), NRHP-listed
- Rutherford County Courthouse, Main St. between 2nd and 3rd Sts., Rutherfordton, North Carolina (Asbury, Louis H.), NRHP-listed
- St. Philip's Episcopal Church, 317 E. Main St., Brevard, North Carolina (Asbury, Louis Humbert), NRHP-listed
- One or more works in Stonewall Jackson Training School Historic District, SR 1157, Concord, North Carolina (Asbury, Louis H.), NRHP-listed
- One or more works in Myers Park Historic District, roughly bounded by NC 16, E and W Queens Rd., and Lillington Ave., Charlotte, North Carolina, NRHP-listed
- One or more works in Wesley Heights Historic District, bounded by W. Morehead St., Woodruff Pl., Lela Ave., CSX RR tracks, Tuckaseegee Rd., W. Trade St. and S. Summit Ave., Charlotte, North Carolina (Asbury, Louis), NRHP-listed
- One or more works in West Main Street Historic District, 121 Cool Springs Dr., 343-499 W. Maine St., 121 Memorial Dr., Forest City, North Carolina (Asbury, Louis Humbert), NRHP-listed

== See also ==
- Fraternal Order of Eagles Building, 220 E. Marshall St., Richmond, Virginia (Asbury and Whitehurst), NRHP-listed
- Jackson Ward Historic District, 400 blocks 1st, 2nd, & 3rd Sts., 106-108 E. Marshall, 411-413 N. Adams St., Richmond, Virginia (Asbury and Whitehurst), NRHP-listed
