= East Main Street Historic District (Brevard, North Carolina) =

Historic district in North Carolina, United States

- U.S. National Register of Historic Places
- U.S. Historic district
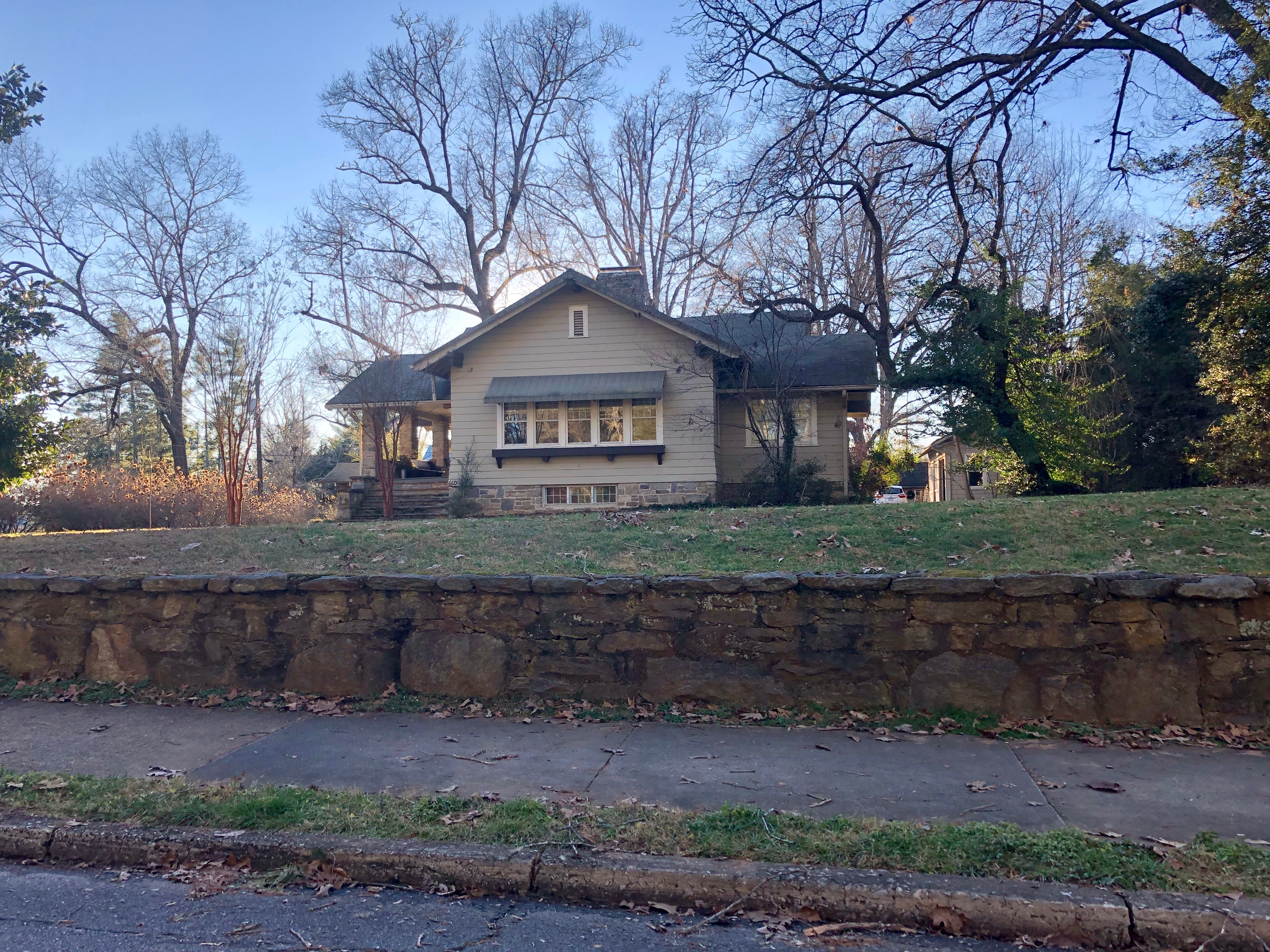
- Carrier-Plummer House, 2019

- Location within North Carolina Location within the United States
- Location: 249-683 and 768 East Main St.; 6-7 Rice St.; St. Phillip's Ln.; 1-60 Woodside Dr.; and 33 Deacon Ln., Brevard, North Carolina
- Coordinates: 35°14′5″N 82°44′13″W
- Area: 47 acres (19 ha)
- Architect: Henry I. Gaines, et al.
- Architectural style: Bungalow/craftsman, Colonial Revival
- MPS: Transylvania County MPS
- NRHP reference No.: 09000638
- Added to NRHP: August 20, 2009

East Main Street Historic District is a national historic district located at Brevard, Transylvania County, North Carolina. It encompasses 14 contributing buildings, 1 contributing structure, and 1 contributing site in a predominantly residential section of Brevard. The district developed between about 1900 and 1959 and includes notable examples of Colonial Revival and Bungalow / American Craftsman style architecture. Located in the district are the separately listed St. Philip's Episcopal Church, Silvermont, William Breese, Jr., House, Charles E. Orr House, Royal and Louise Morrow House, and Max and Claire Brombacher House. Other notable buildings include the Lankford-Cleveland House (c. 1858, 1900), Brevard-Davidson River Presbyterian Church (1956, 1965, 1996), White House (c. 1900), Wyke-Barclay House (1905), and Carrier-Plummer House (1914).

It was listed on the National Register of Historic Places in 2009.

== Gallery ==
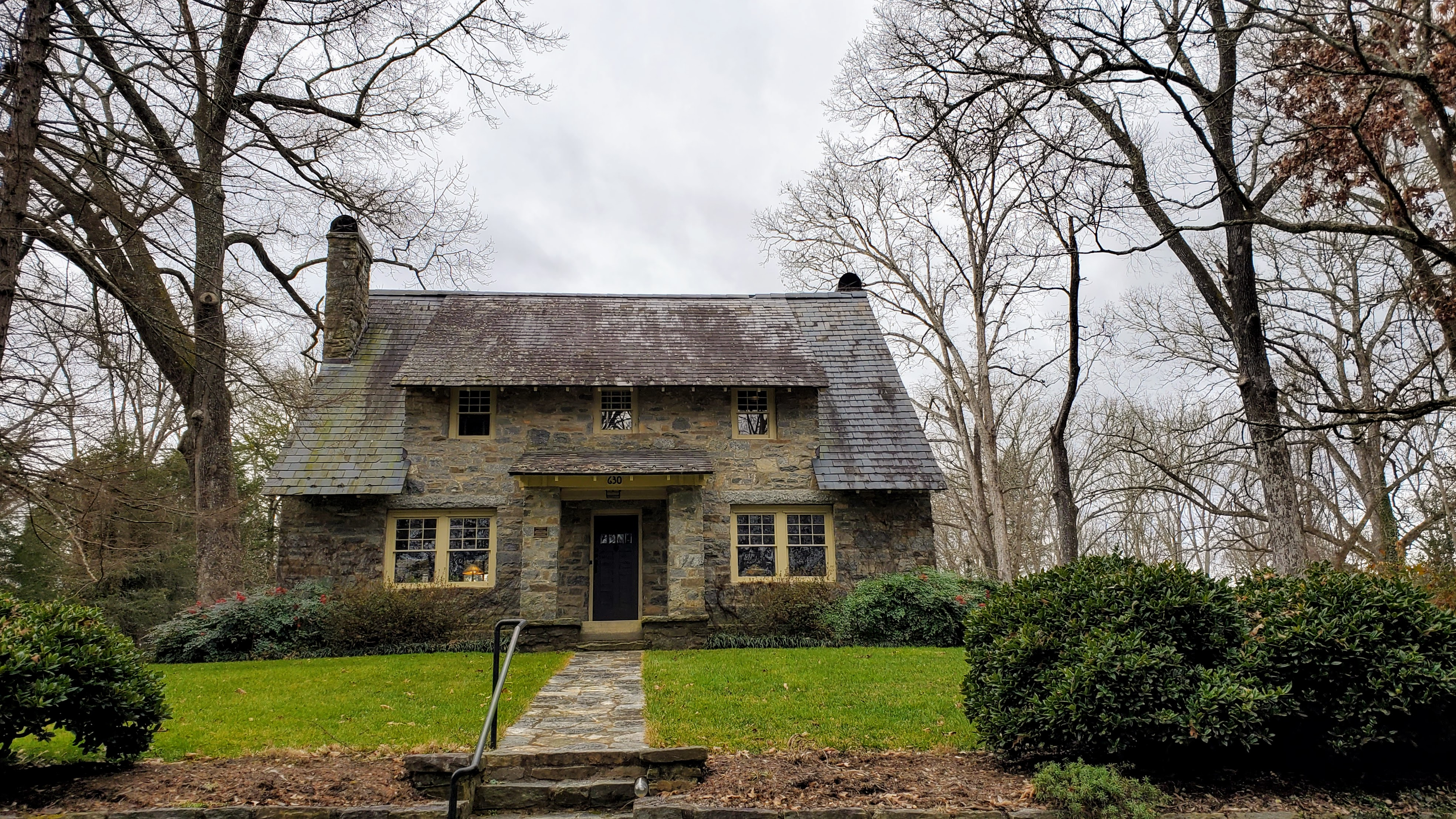
Royal and Louise Morrow House, 2021

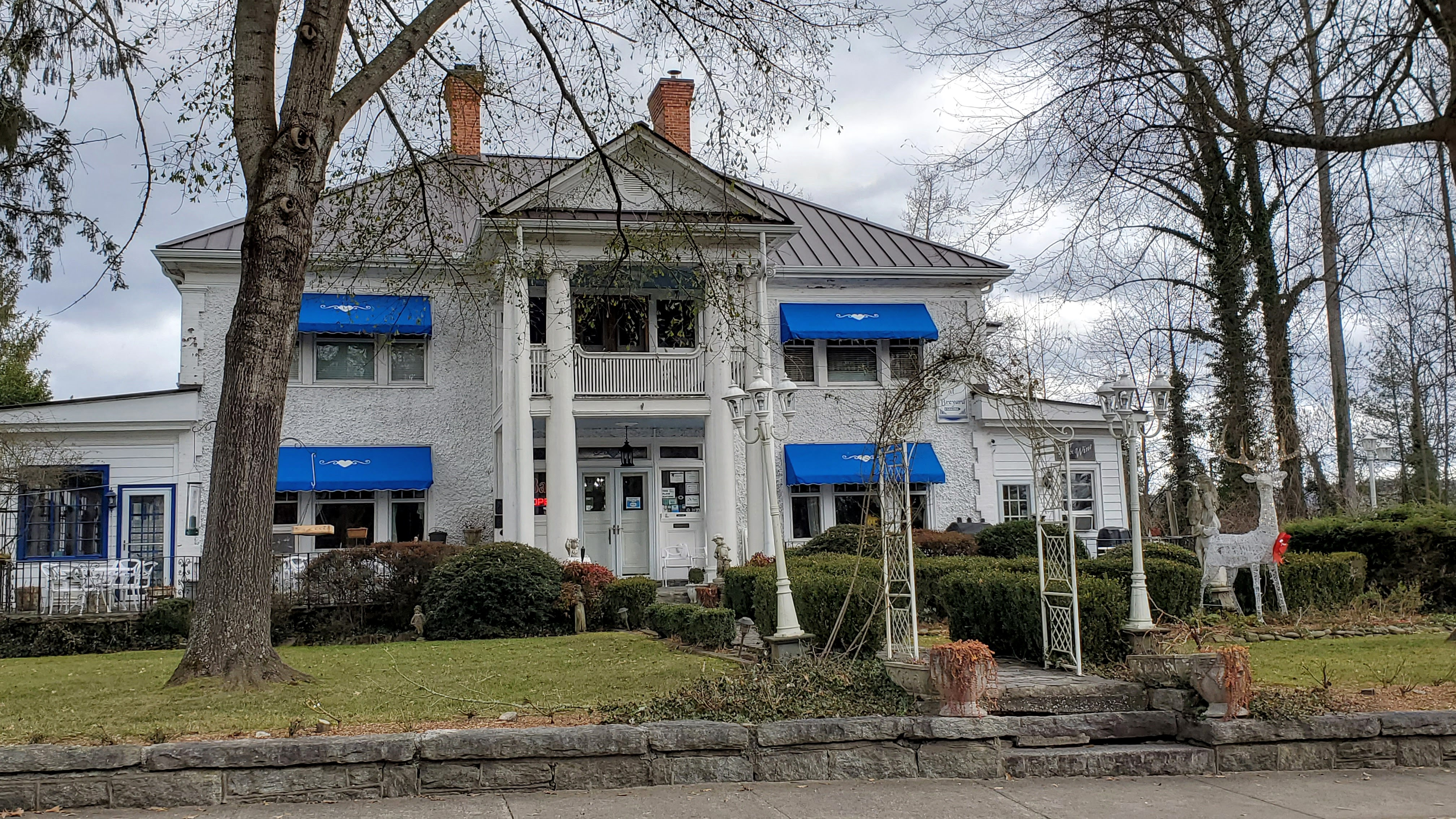
William Breese Jr. House, 2021

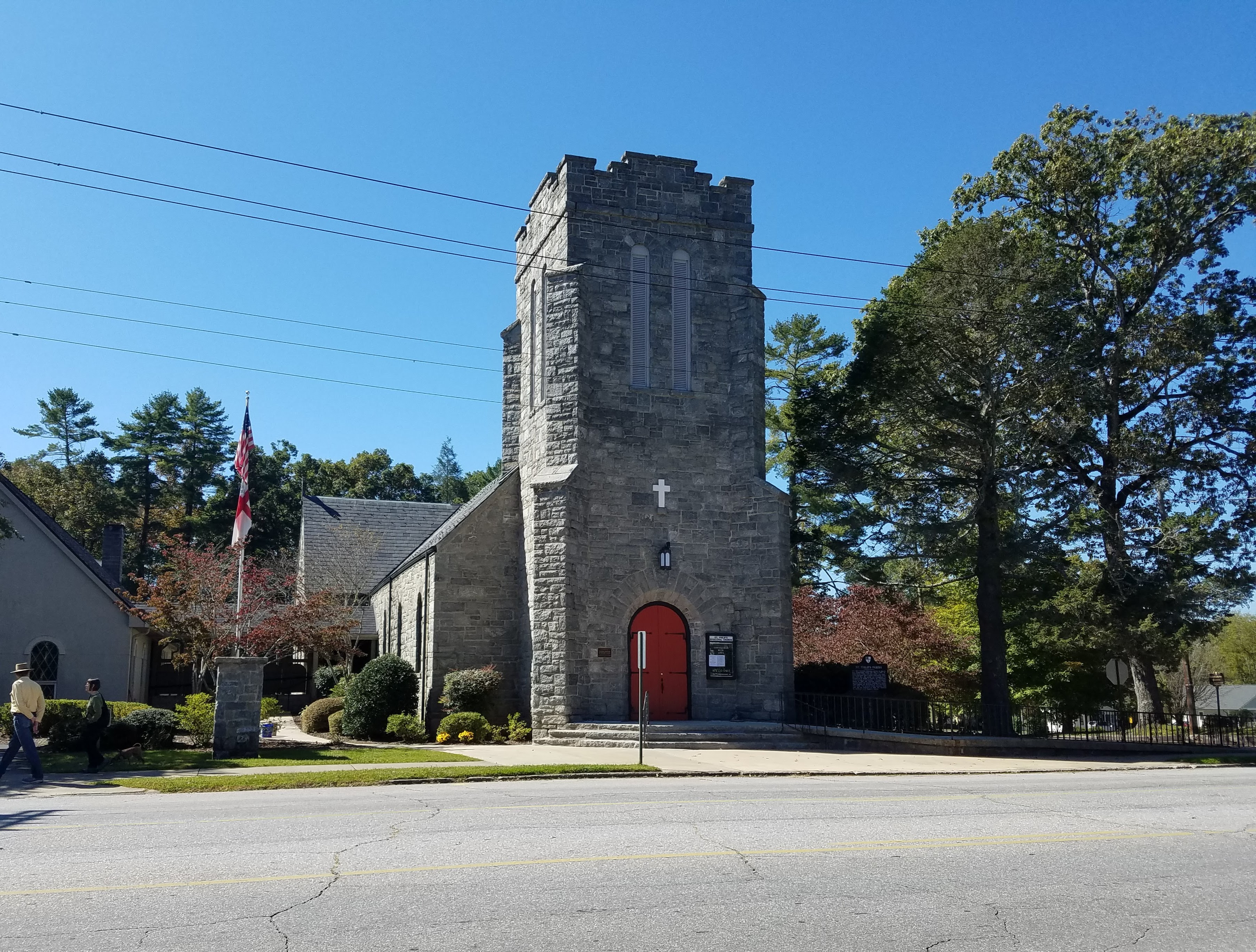
St. Philips Episcopal Church, 2020

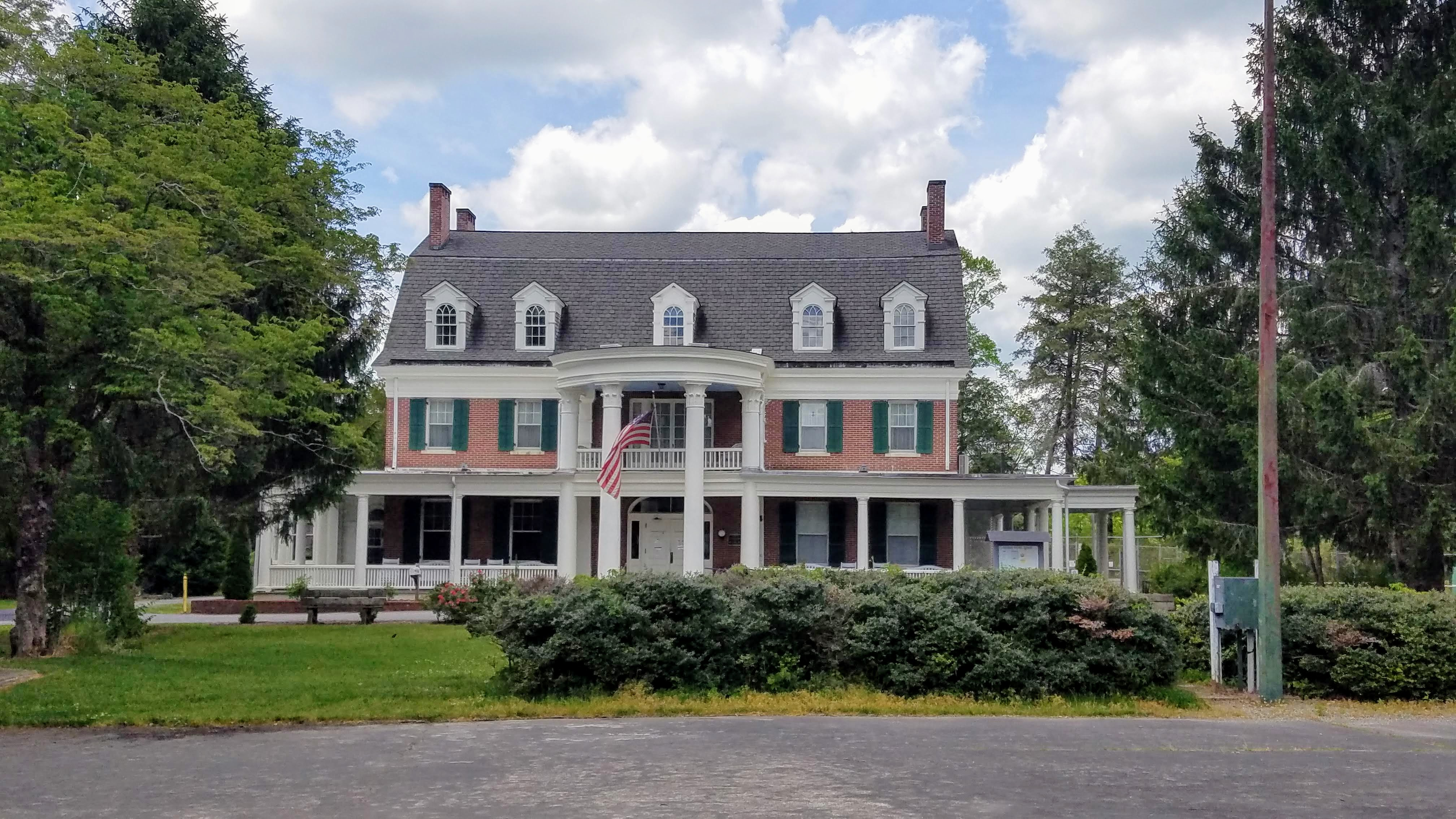
Silvermont, 2020

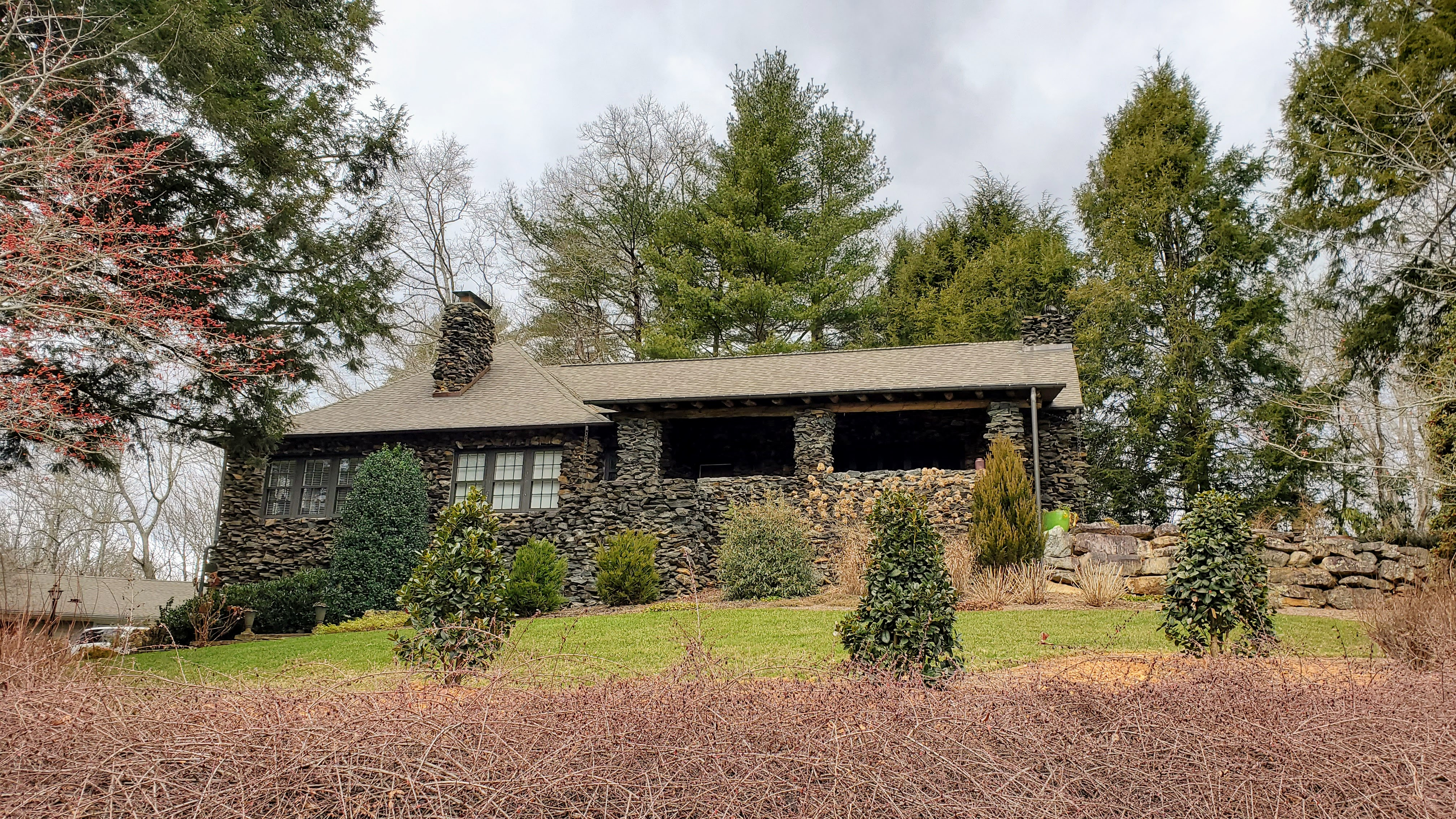
Max and Claire Brombacher House, 2021

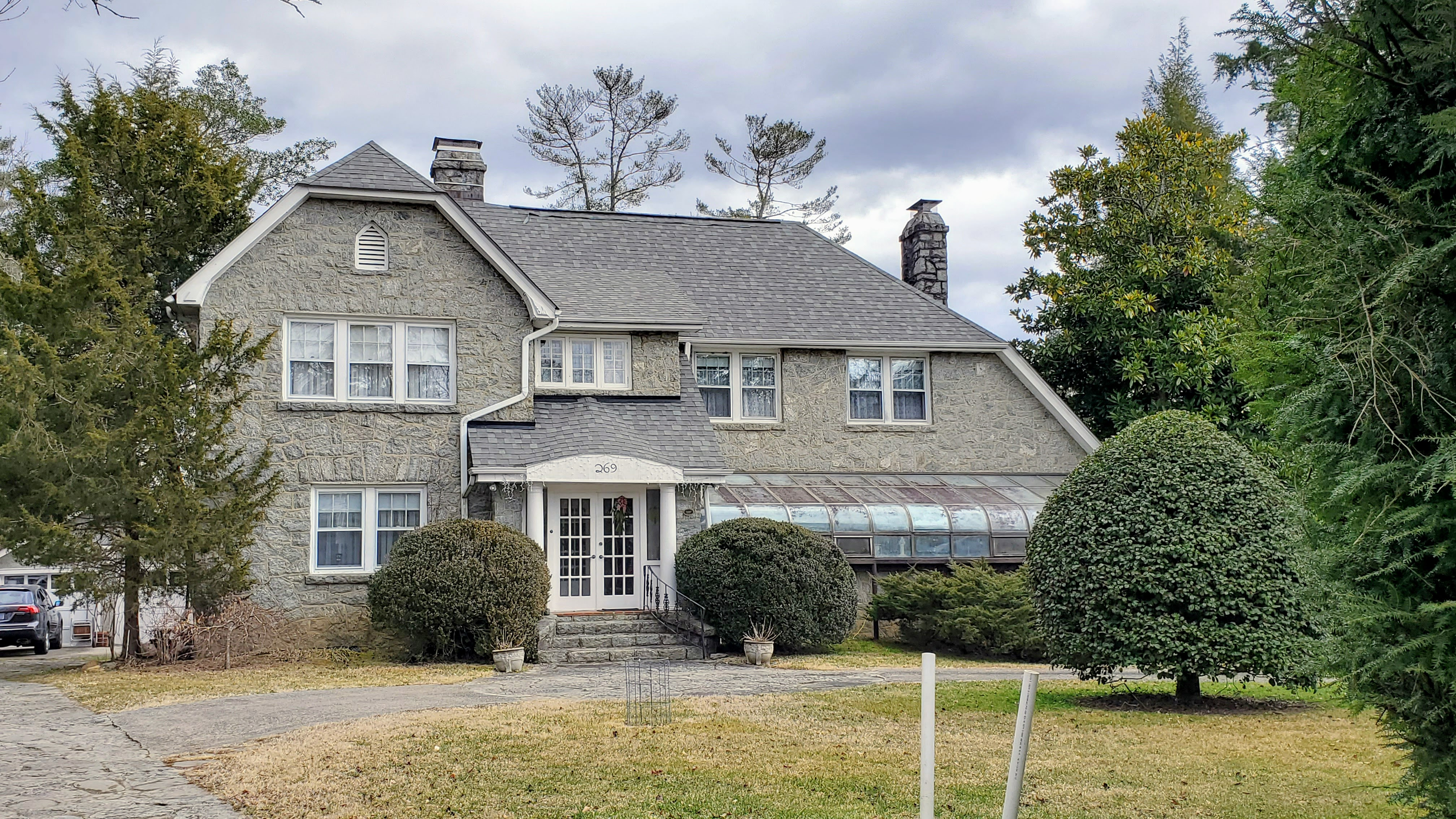
Charles E. Orr House, 2021
