= Rutherford County Courthouse =

Rutherford County Courthouse may refer to:

- Rutherford County Courthouse (North Carolina), listed on the National Register of Historic Places (NRHP) in North Carolina
- Rutherford County Courthouse (Tennessee), listed on the NRHP in Tennessee
