= Main Street Historic District (Rutherfordton, North Carolina) =

Historic district in North Carolina, United States

- U.S. National Register of Historic Places
- U.S. Historic district
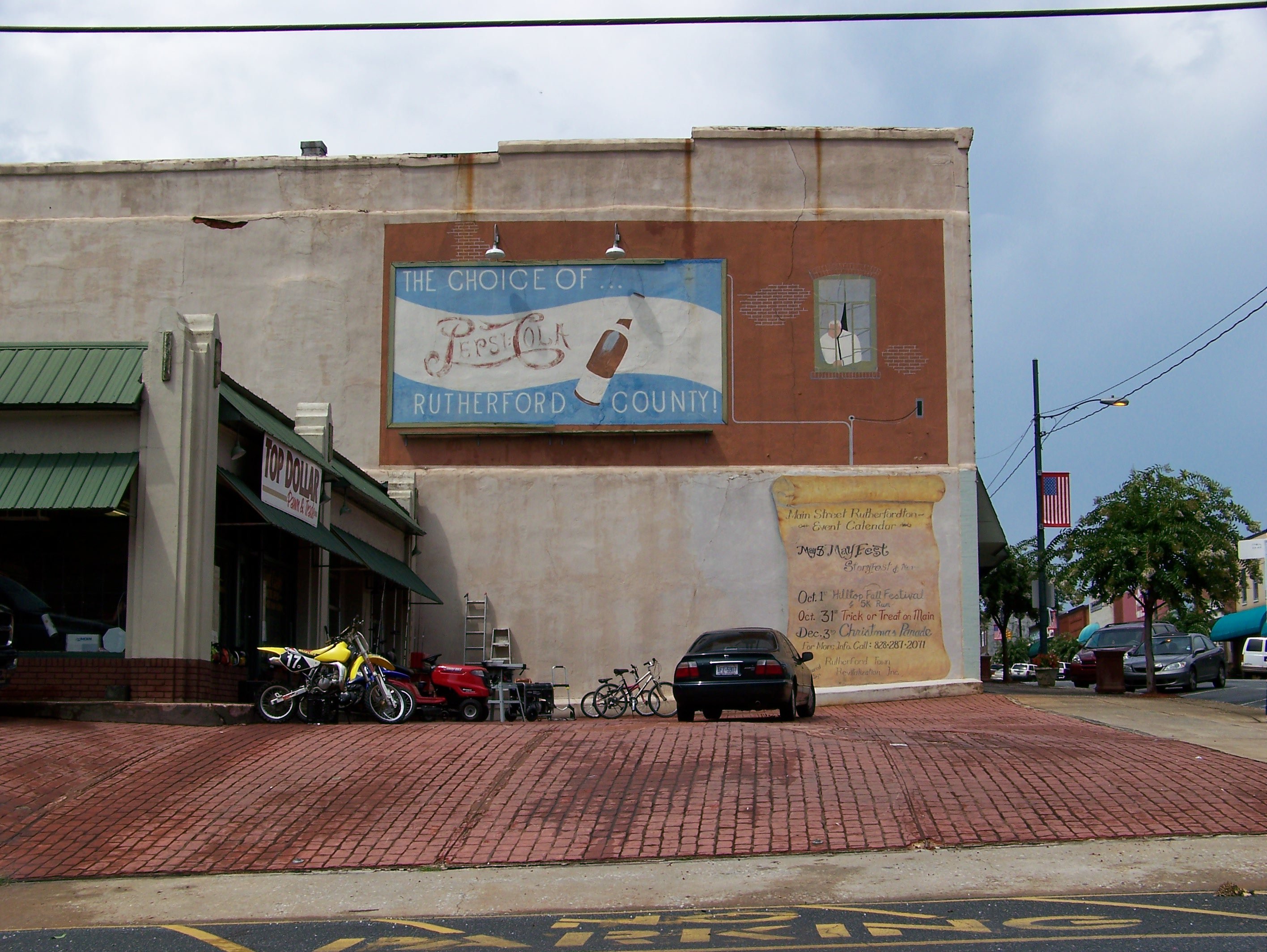
- Downtown Rutherfordton, July 2012

- Location within North Carolina Location within the United States
- Location: Roughly bounded by Taylor, Court, Washington and W. Third Sts., Rutherfordton, North Carolina
- Coordinates: 35°22′04″N 81°57′27″W
- Area: 10.8 acres (4.4 ha)
- Built: 1925
- Architect: Louis H. Asbury; Milburn, Heister & Company
- Architectural style: Colonial Revival, Classical Revival, Early Commercial
- NRHP reference No.: 95001419
- Added to NRHP: December 7, 1995

Main Street Historic District is a national historic district located at Rutherfordton, Rutherford County, North Carolina. It encompasses 43 contributing buildings and 1 contributing object in the central business district of Rutherfordton. The district developed from about 1898 to 1945, and includes notable examples of Classical Revival and Colonial Revival style architecture. Located in the district is the separately listed Rutherford County Courthouse designed by Louis H. Asbury (1877-1975). Other notable contributing buildings include the U.S. Post Office (1931), the Norris Public Library (1933), (former) Rutherford County Jail, Commercial National Bank, Keeter Hardware Company Building, Geer Commercial Building, Southern Hotel Company Building, Geer-Warlick Motor Company Building, and City Hall (1925) designed by Milburn, Heister & Company.

It was added to the National Register of Historic Places in 1995.

== Gallery ==
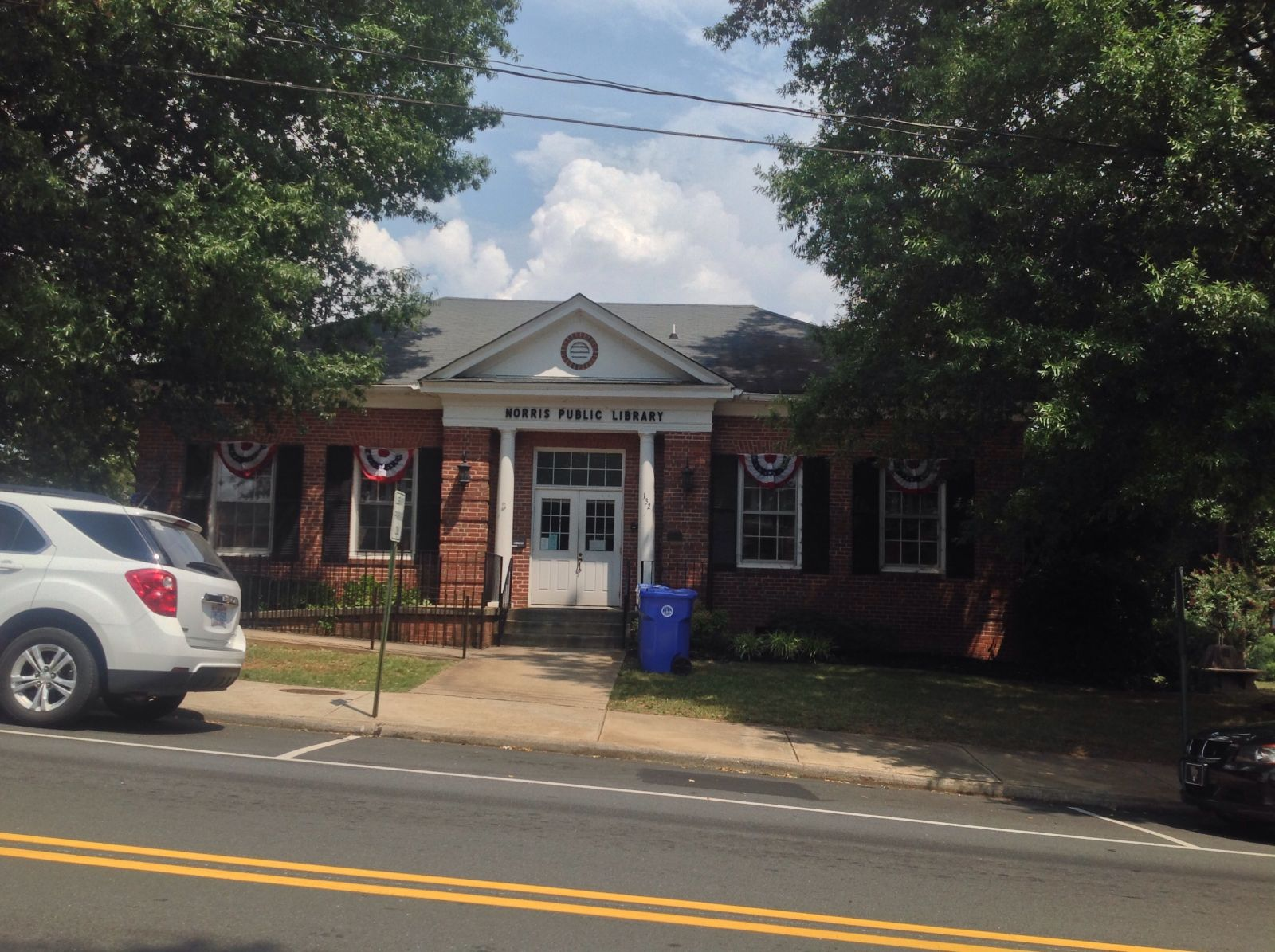
Norris Public Library, 2016

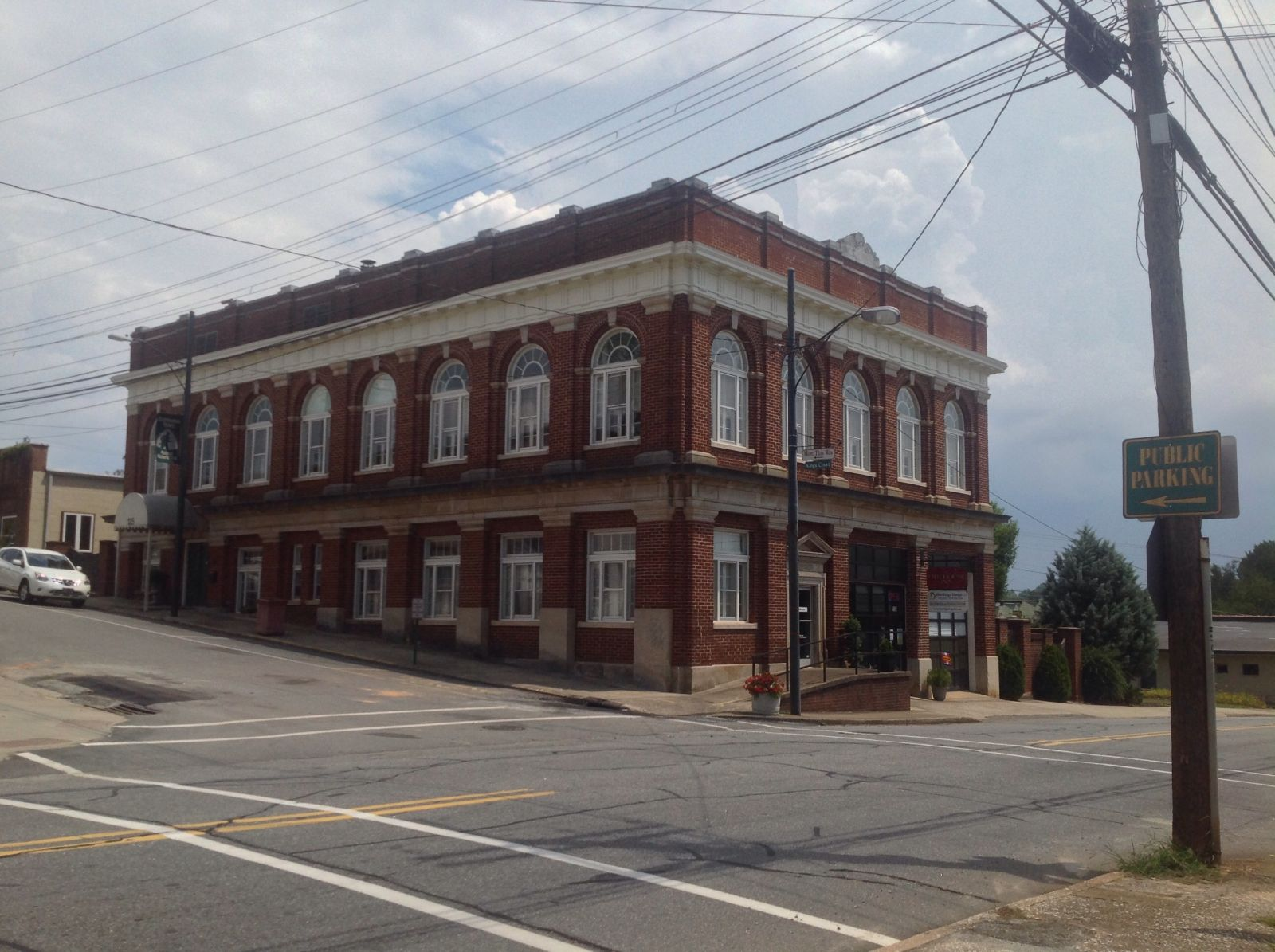
Old City Hall, 2016

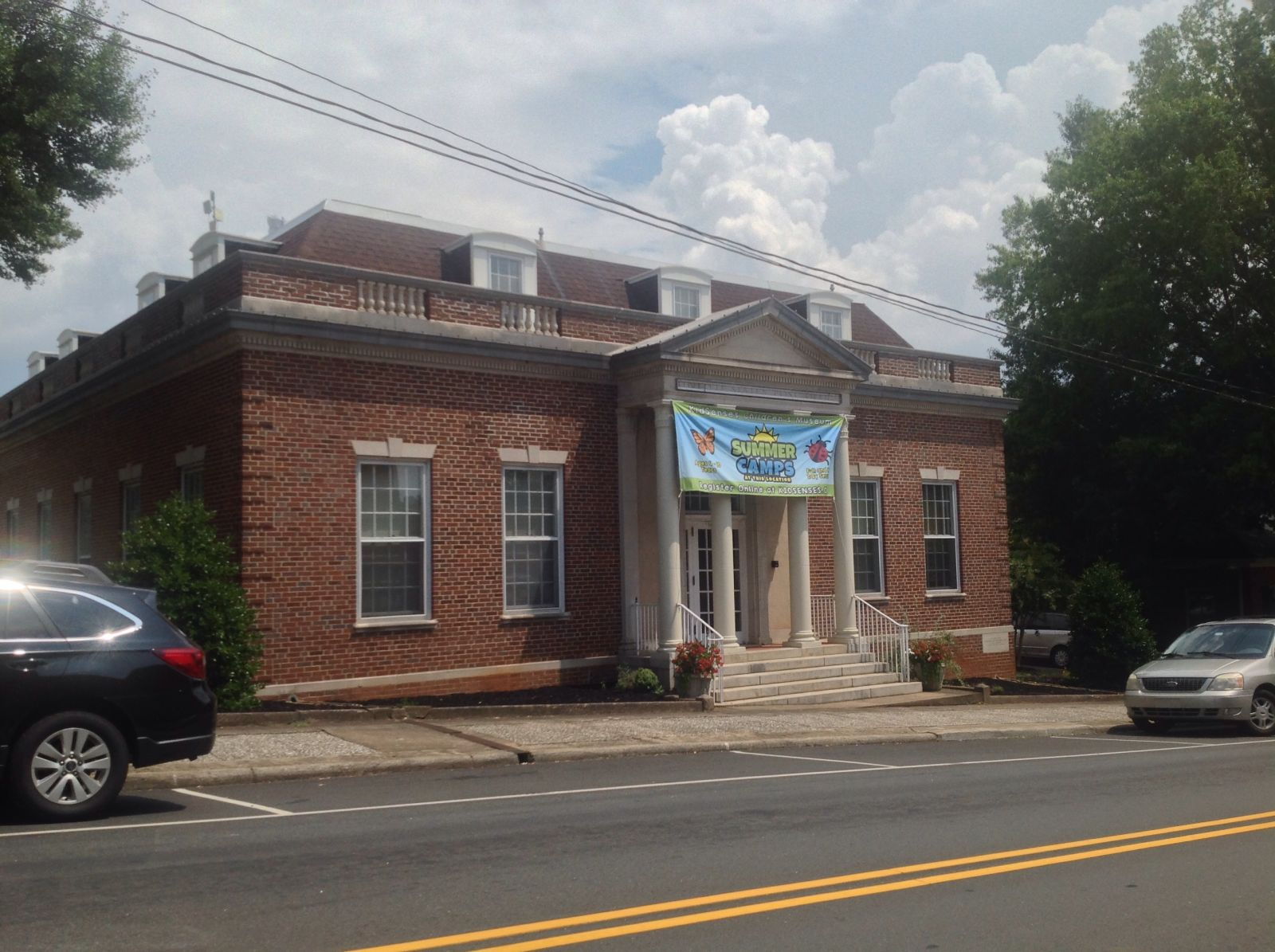
Old Post Office, 2016
