= Fraternal Order of Eagles Building (Richmond, Virginia) =

Historic building in Virginia, US

- U.S. National Register of Historic Places
- Virginia Landmarks Register
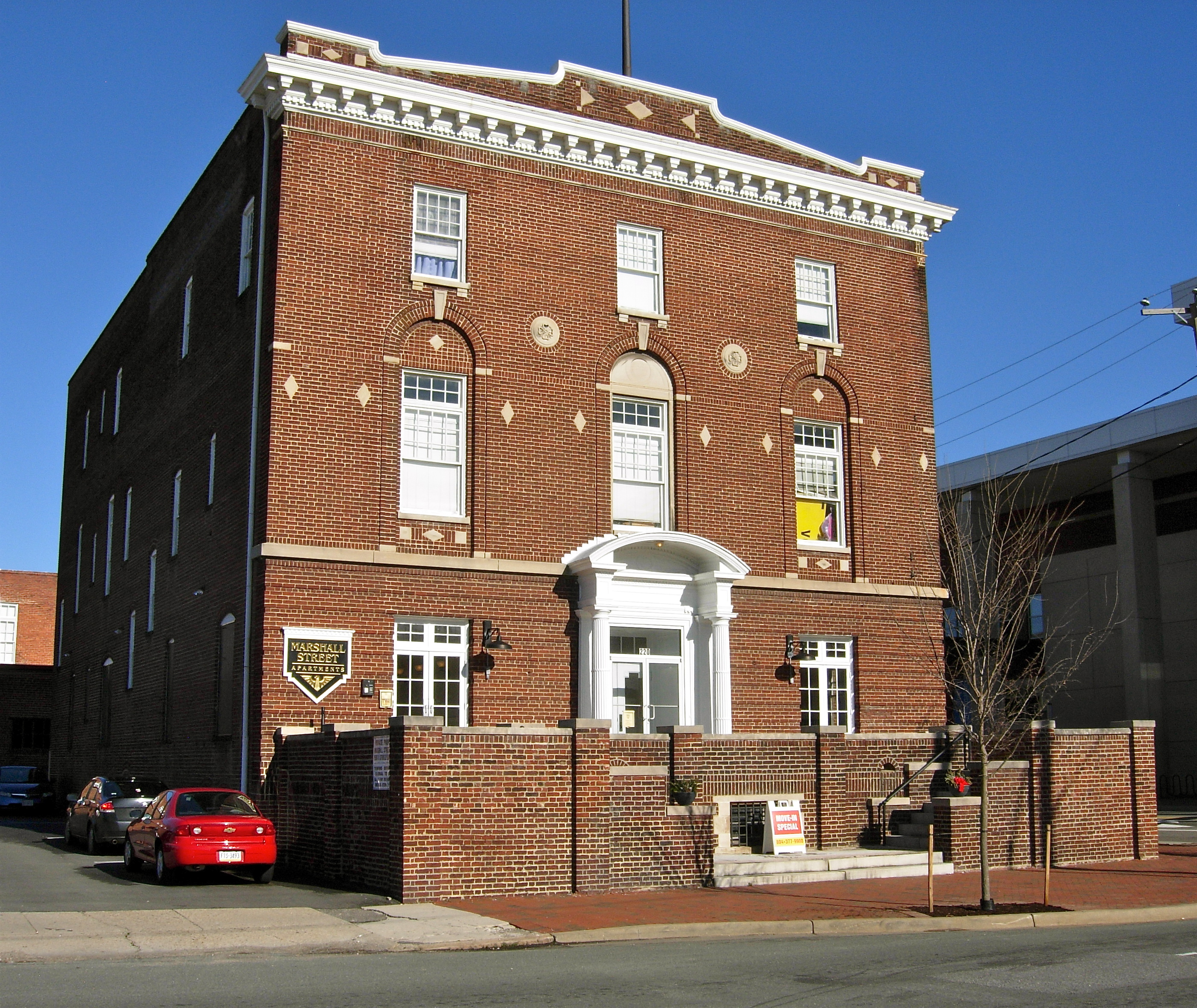
- Fraternal Order of Eagles Building, January 2012

- Location within Virginia Location within the United States
- Location: 220 E. Marshall St., Richmond, Virginia
- Coordinates: 37°32′49″N 77°26′20″W
- Area: less than one acre
- Built: 1914
- Architect: Asbury and Whitehurst
- Architectural style: Classical Revival
- NRHP reference No.: 06000346
- VLR No.: 127-5885

Significant dates
- Added to NRHP: May 3, 2006
- Designated VLR: March 8, 2006

The Fraternal Order of Eagles Building is a historic Fraternal Order of Eagles clubhouse located in Richmond, Virginia. It was built in 1914, and is a three-story, three bay by six bay, rectangular brick building in the Neoclassical Revival style. In 2005, the building was renovated into apartments with a commercial space in the basement.

It was listed on the National Register of Historic Places in 2006.
