= St. Philip's Episcopal Church (Brevard, North Carolina) =

Historic church in North Carolina, United States

- U.S. National Register of Historic Places
- U.S. Historic district – Contributing property
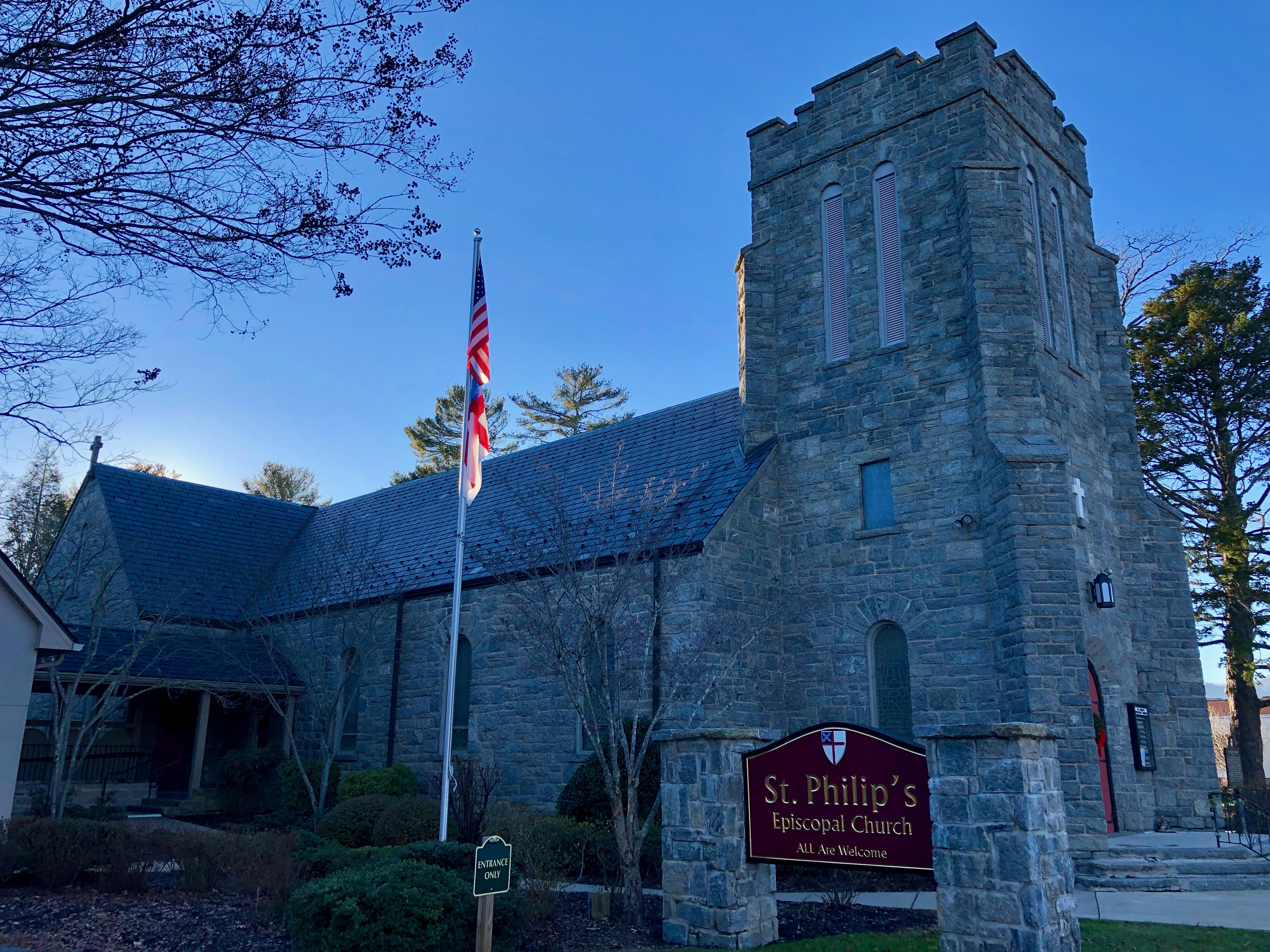
- St. Philip's Episcopal Church, January 2019

- Location within North Carolina Location within the United States
- Location: 256 E. Main St., Brevard, North Carolina
- Coordinates: 35°13′54″N 82°43′51″W
- Area: less than one acre
- Built: 1926
- Built by: Kilpatrick, Marshall
- Architect: Asbury, Louis Humbert
- Architectural style: Normanesque Revival
- MPS: Transylvania County MPS
- NRHP reference No.: 97001594
- Added to NRHP: December 30, 1997

St. Philip's Episcopal Church is a historic Episcopal church located at 256 E. Main Street in Brevard, Transylvania County, North Carolina. It was designed by architect Louis Humbert Asbury and built in 1926. It is a tall one-story, Normanesque Revival style stone structure on a nave plan, with a narthex/tower on the main elevation and a chancel on the rear. It has a two-story bell tower and stained glass windows.

It was added to the National Register of Historic Places in 1997. It is located in the East Main Street Historic District.
