= Mecklenburg County Courthouse (North Carolina) =

- Old Mecklenburg County Courthouse
- U.S. National Register of Historic Places
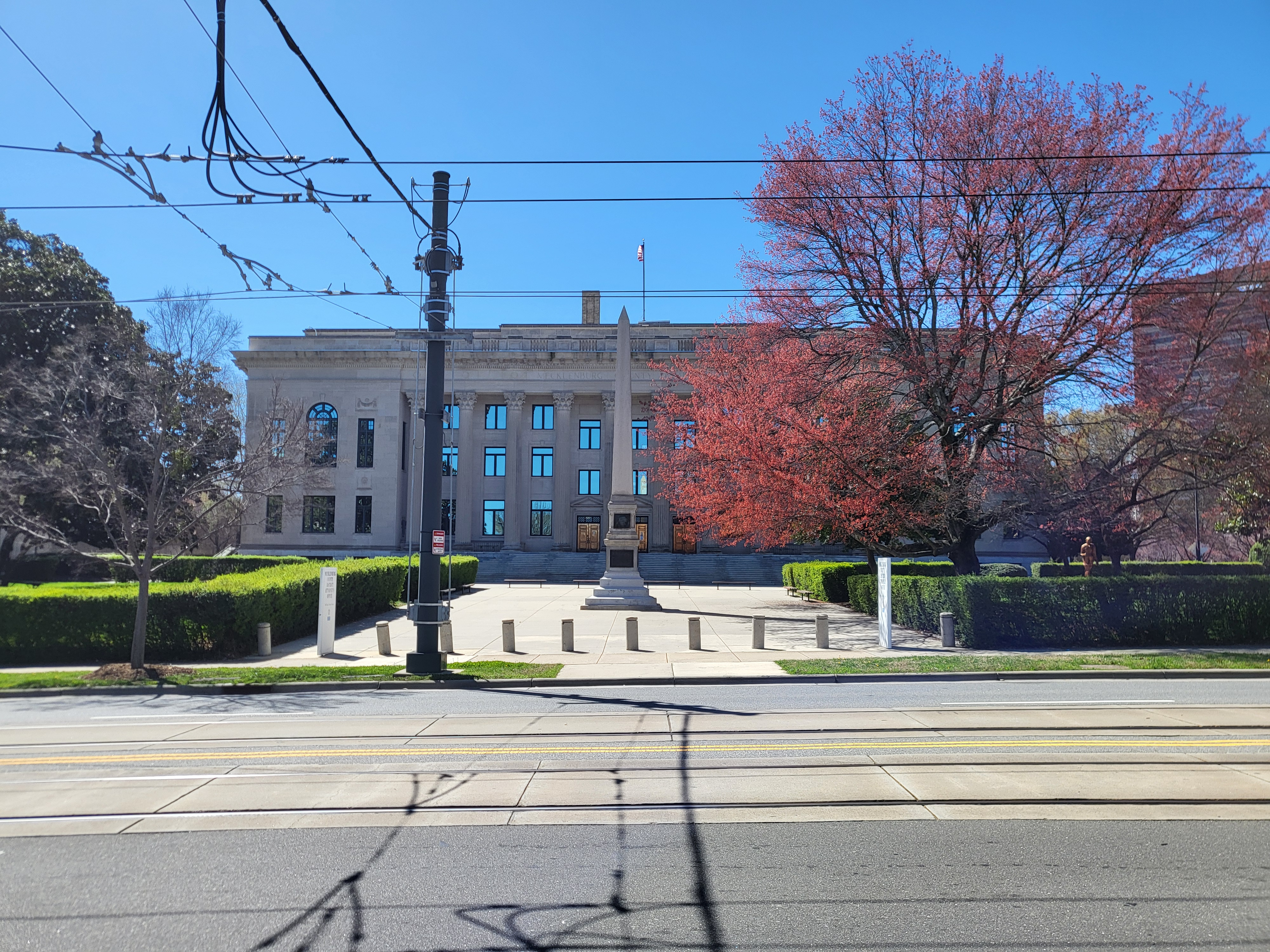
- Old Mecklenburg County Courthouse March 2024

- Location within North Carolina Location within the United States
- Interactive map showing the location of Mecklenburg County Courthouse
- Location: E. Trade, Alexander, and E. 4th Sts., Charlotte, North Carolina
- Coordinates: 35°13′16″N 80°50′15″W
- Area: 3 acres (1.2 ha)
- Built: 1925-1928
- Architect: Asbury, Louis H.
- Architectural style: Classical Revival
- MPS: North Carolina County Courthouses TR
- NRHP reference No.: 79001734
- Added to NRHP: May 10, 1979

Mecklenburg County Courthouse is a historic courthouse building located at Charlotte, Mecklenburg County, North Carolina, United States. It was designed by architect Louis H. Asbury and built between 1925 and 1928. It is four-story, rectangular, Neoclassical building sheathed in limestone. The structure is a three-part composition with a decastyle Corinthian order portico on the front facade. The rear elevation has a tetrastyle portico sheltering the three-center bays and Corinthian pilasters.

It was listed on the National Register of Historic Places in 1979.
