= Royal and Louise Morrow House =

Historic house in North Carolina, United States

- U.S. National Register of Historic Places
- U.S. Historic district – Contributing property
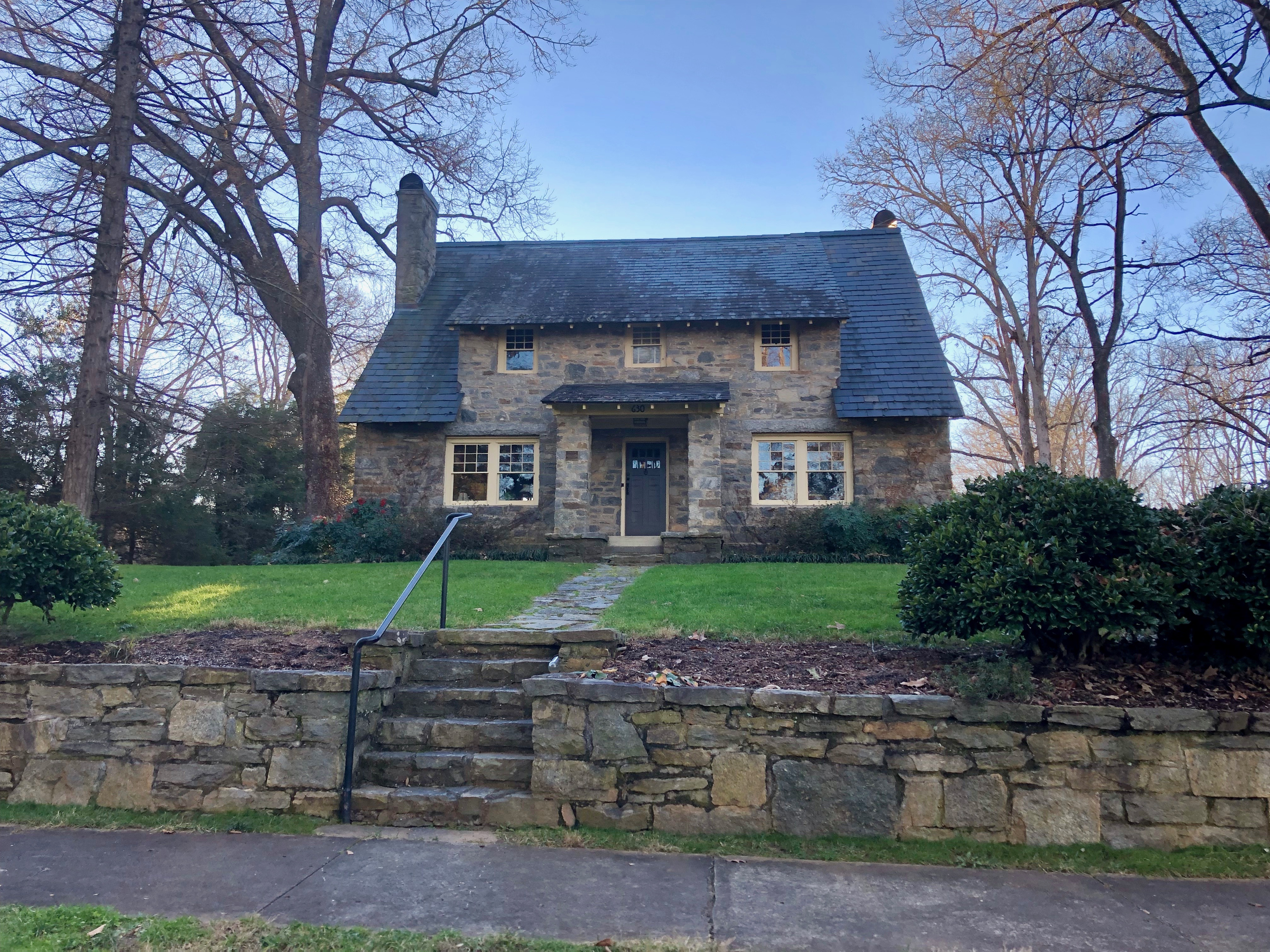
- Royal and Louise Morrow House, January 2019

- Location within North Carolina Location within the United States
- Location: 630 E. Main St., Brevard, North Carolina
- Coordinates: 35°13′36″N 82°43′40″W
- Area: less than one acre
- Built: 1915
- Architect: Kilpatrick, R.P.
- Architectural style: Bungalow/American craftsman
- MPS: Transylvania County MPS
- NRHP reference No.: 06001107
- Added to NRHP: December 6, 2006

Royal and Louise Morrow House, also known as Stone Cottage, is a historic home located at Brevard, Transylvania County, North Carolina. It was built in 1915, and is a 1 1/2-story, Bungalow / American Craftsman style stone dwelling. It has a steep, side-gable roof and three-bay wall dormers. Also on the property is a contributing garage.

It was listed on the National Register of Historic Places in 2006. It is located in the East Main Street Historic District.
