= Cool Springs High School =

Historic school building in North Carolina, United States

- U.S. National Register of Historic Places
- U.S. Historic district – Contributing property
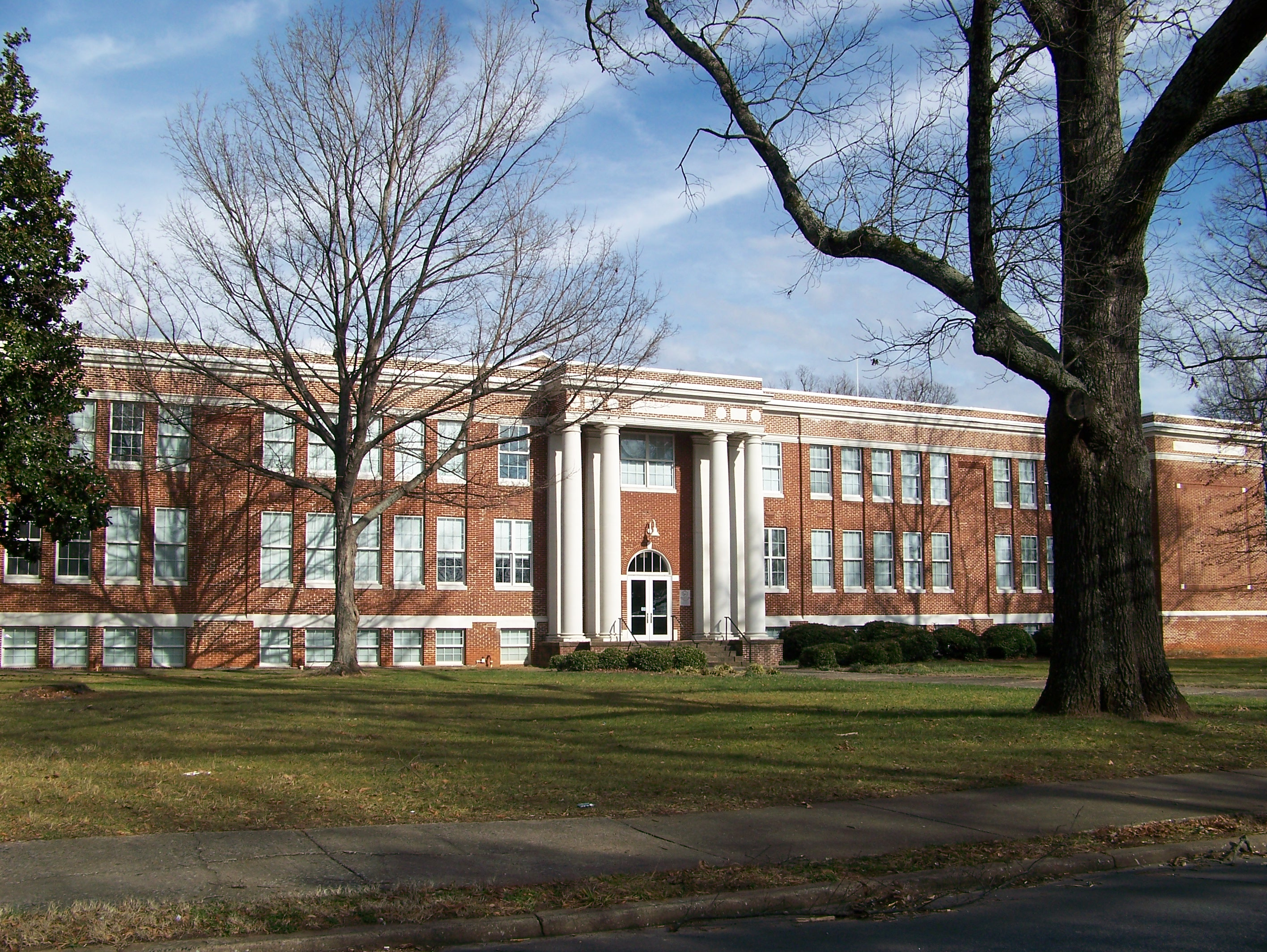
- Cool Springs High School, January 2013

- Location within North Carolina Location within the United States
- Location: 382 W. Main St., Forest City, North Carolina
- Coordinates: 35°20′19″N 81°51′58″W
- Area: 2.4 acres (0.97 ha)
- Built: 1924
- Built by: Kistler, H.A.
- Architect: Asbury, Louis Humbert
- Architectural style: Classical Revival
- NRHP reference No.: 99000813
- Added to NRHP: July 8, 1999

Cool Springs High School is a historic high school building located at Forest City, Rutherford County, North Carolina. It was designed by architect Louis H. Asbury (1877-1975) and built in 1924. It is a two-story on basement, "T"-plan, Classical Revival-style red brick building. The front facade features a shallow four-column Tuscan order portico with echoing pilasters. In May 1998 it ceased to be used for instructional purposes.

It was added to the National Register of Historic Places in 1999. It is located in the West Main Street Historic District.

Note: There was also a historic Cool Spring High School in Cool Springs Township, Iredell County, North Carolina.
