= William Breese Jr. House =

Historic house in North Carolina, United States

- U.S. National Register of Historic Places
- U.S. Historic district – Contributing property
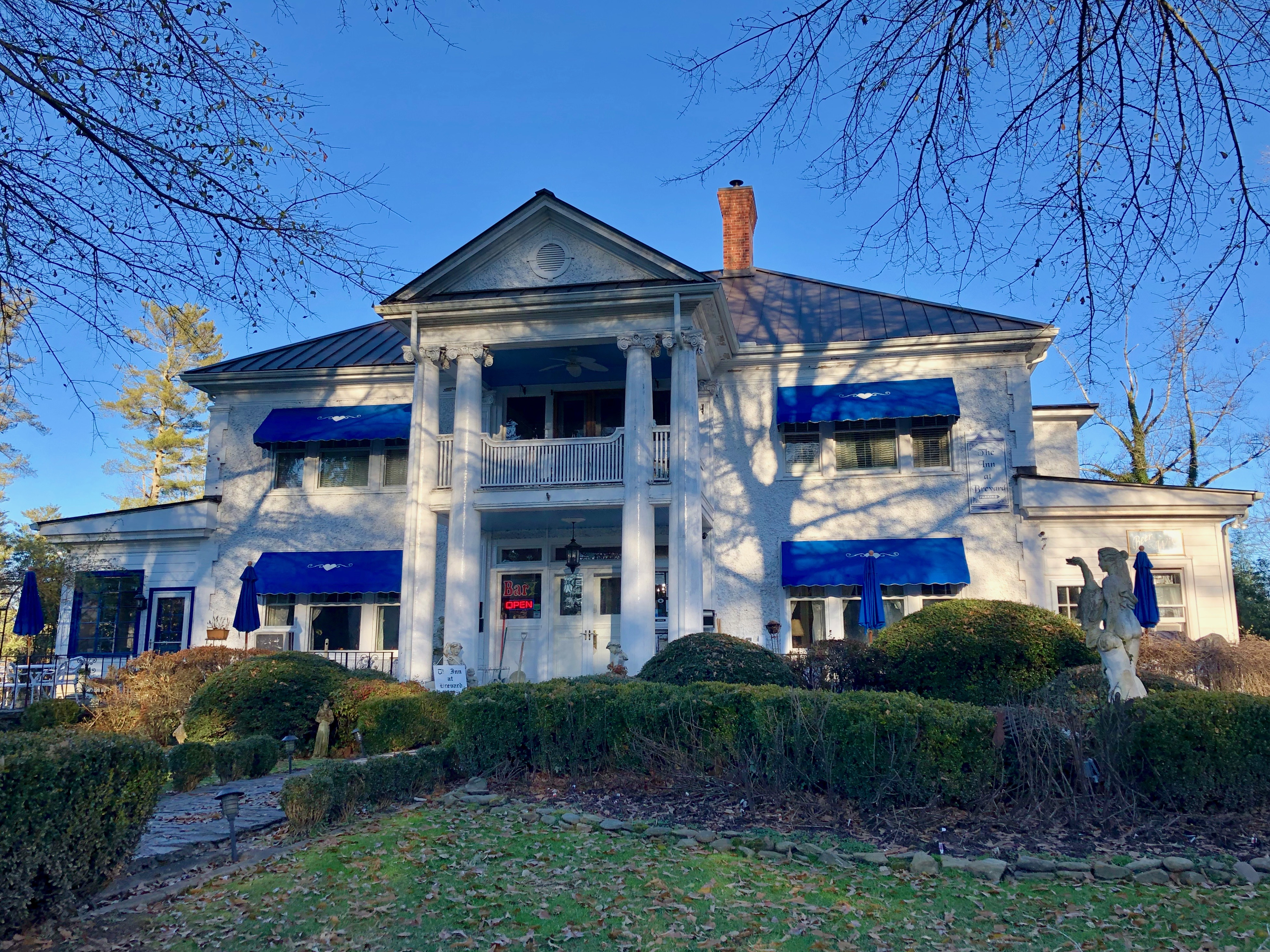
- William Breese, Jr. House, January 2019

- Location within North Carolina Location within the United States
- Location: 401 E. Main St., Brevard, North Carolina
- Coordinates: 35°13′58″N 82°43′54″W
- Area: 1 acre (0.40 ha)
- Built: 1902
- Architectural style: Classical Revival
- NRHP reference No.: 83001920
- Added to NRHP: June 23, 1983

William Breese Jr. House, also known as the Colonial Inn and the Inn at Brevard, is a historic home located at Brevard, Transylvania County, North Carolina. It was built about 1902, and is a two-story, Classical Revival style frame dwelling with a pebbledash finish and hipped roof. It has a two-story rear ell and features a central, two-story Ionic order entrance portico. It was converted for use as an inn and restaurant around 1955.

It was listed on the National Register of Historic Places in 1983. It is located in the East Main Street Historic District.

Numerous changes have accompanied the building's conversion to a restaurant and inn.

On the second floor a wall was removed from between the south rooms creating a large meeting roo~. On the ground floor the doorway to the original dining room has been enlarged. One fireplace has been closed off. Most of the building's ceilings have received facing materials such as acoustical tile. However, the institutional kitchen manages to function out of the original kitchen space and overall the original character of the building has not been seriously compromised.

The Colonial Inn remains one of Brevard's examples of turn of the century architecture. Through its use of the local pebbledash to execute the familiar Neo-classical Revival design, it makes a strong statement about propriety in turn of the century western North Carolina.
