= Silvermont (Brevard, North Carolina) =

Historic house in North Carolina, United States

- U.S. National Register of Historic Places
- U.S. Historic district – Contributing property
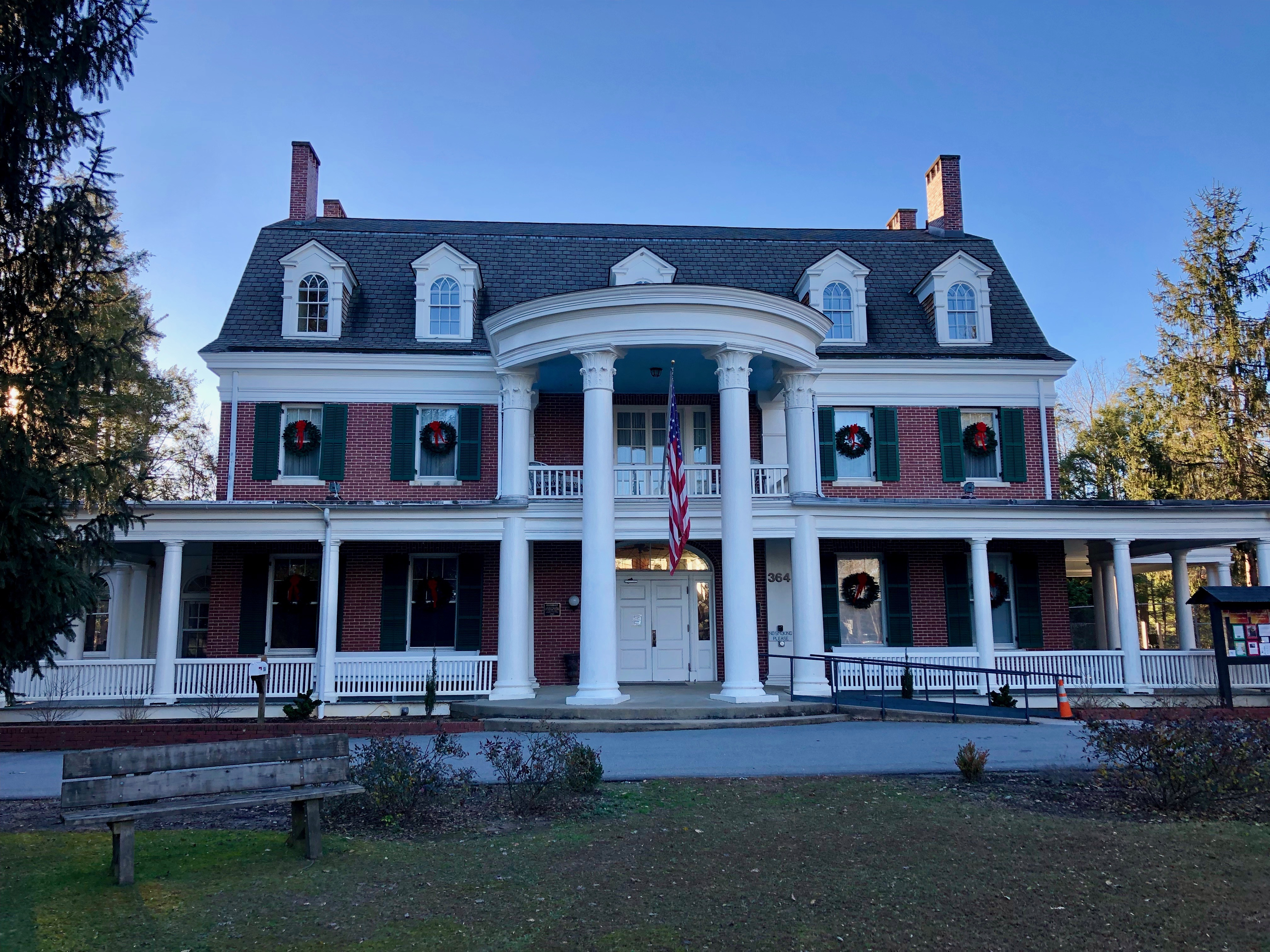
- Silvermont, January 2019

- Location within North Carolina Location within the United States
- Location: E. Main St., Brevard, North Carolina
- Coordinates: 35°13′44″N 82°43′47″W
- Area: 8.5 acres (3.4 ha)
- Built: 1916-1917
- Architectural style: Colonial Revival
- NRHP reference No.: 81000427
- Added to NRHP: July 9, 1981

Silvermont is a historic home located at Brevard, Transylvania County, North Carolina. It was built in 1916–1917, and is a two-story, five-bay, Colonial Revival style brick dwelling with a gambrel roof. Also on the property is a one-story, stone veneer cottage. It has a rear ell, two-story front portico supported by columns with Corinthian order capitals, one-story wraparound porch, porte cochere, and sunroom. The house and grounds were donated to Transylvania County in 1972, and serve as a public recreation center.

It was listed on the National Register of Historic Places in 1981. It is located in the East Main Street Historic District.
