= West Main Street Historic District (Forest City, North Carolina) =

Historic district in North Carolina, United States

- U.S. National Register of Historic Places
- U.S. Historic district
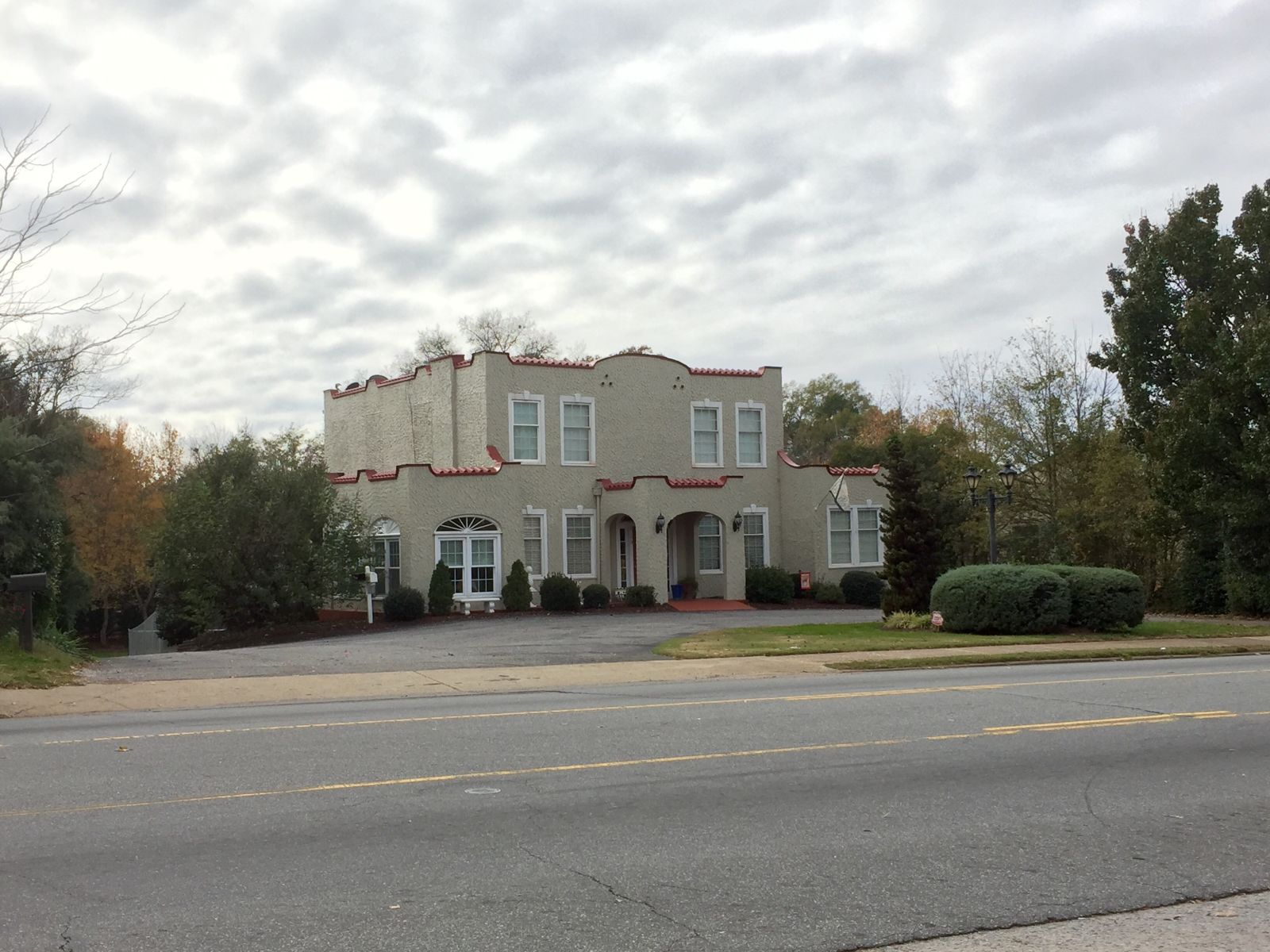
- McMurry-Bodie House, 2015

- Location within North Carolina Location within the United States
- Location: 121 Cool Springs Dr., 343-499 W. Maine St., 121 Memorial Dr., Forest City, North Carolina
- Coordinates: 35°20′20″N 81°52′16″W
- Area: 27 acres (11 ha)
- Built: 1867
- Architect: Asbury, Louis Humbert; Harrill, Chivous Gilmer
- Architectural style: Bungalow/craftsman, Colonial Revival
- NRHP reference No.: 06001142
- Added to NRHP: December 20, 2006

West Main Street Historic District is a national historic district located at Forest City, Rutherford County, North Carolina. It encompasses 27 contributing buildings, 1 contributing site, and 1 contributing object in a predominantly residential section of Forest City. The district developed after 1867, and includes notable examples of Colonial Revival and Bungalow / American Craftsman style architecture. Located in the district is the separately listed Cool Springs High School designed by Louis H. Asbury (1877-1975). Other notable contributing resources include the Cool Springs Cemetery (est. 1867), First Presbyterian Church (1940), the Cool Springs Gymnasium (1958), Lovelace-Ragin House (1928), Harrill-Wilkins House (1925), Frank B. and Mae Bridges Wilkins House (c. 1910), McDaniel House (1913), Biggerstaff-Griffin House (1925), and McMurry-Bodie House (1928).

It was added to the National Register of Historic Places in 2006.

== Gallery ==
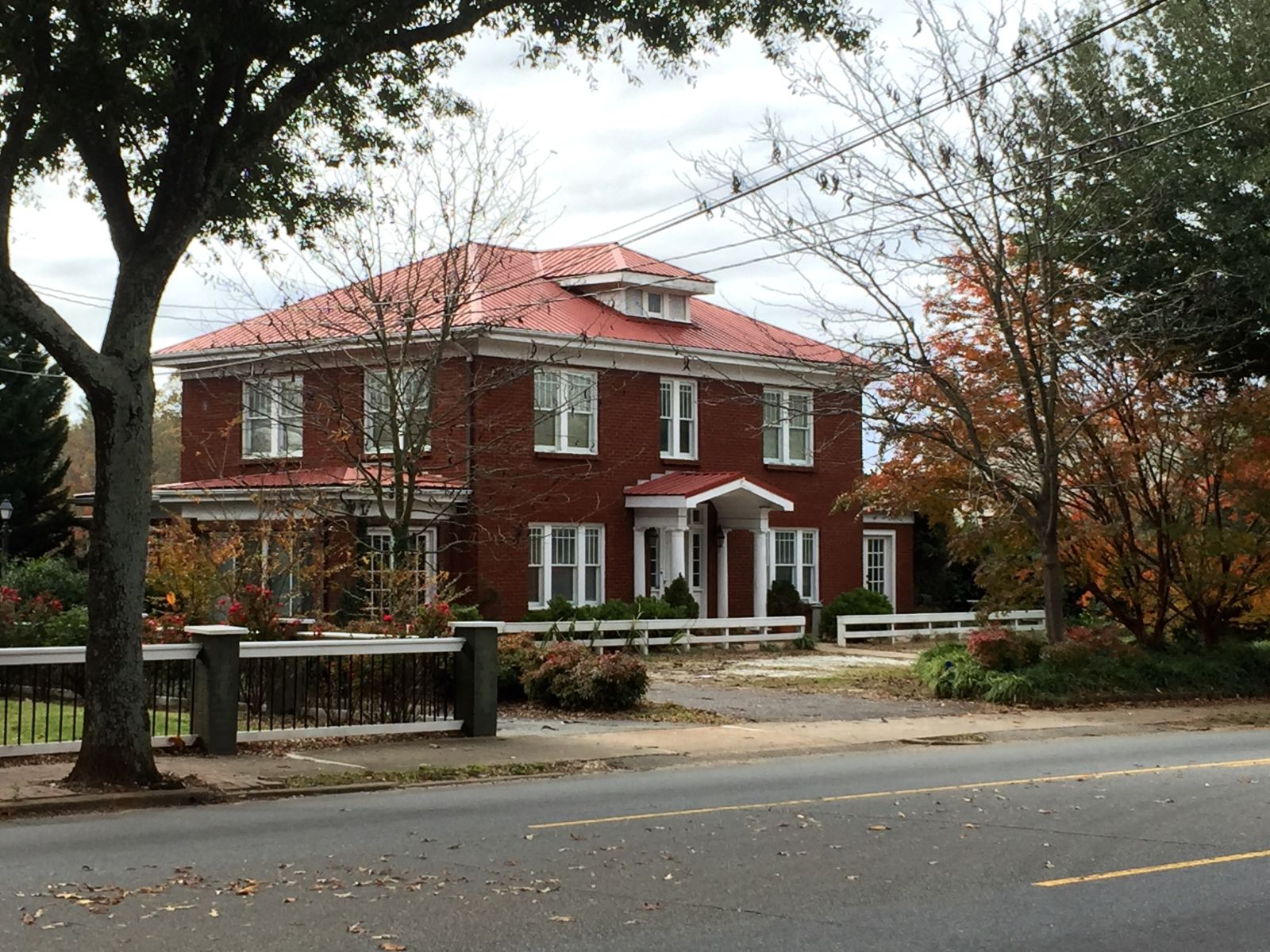
Charles S. and Mary Hemphill House, 2015

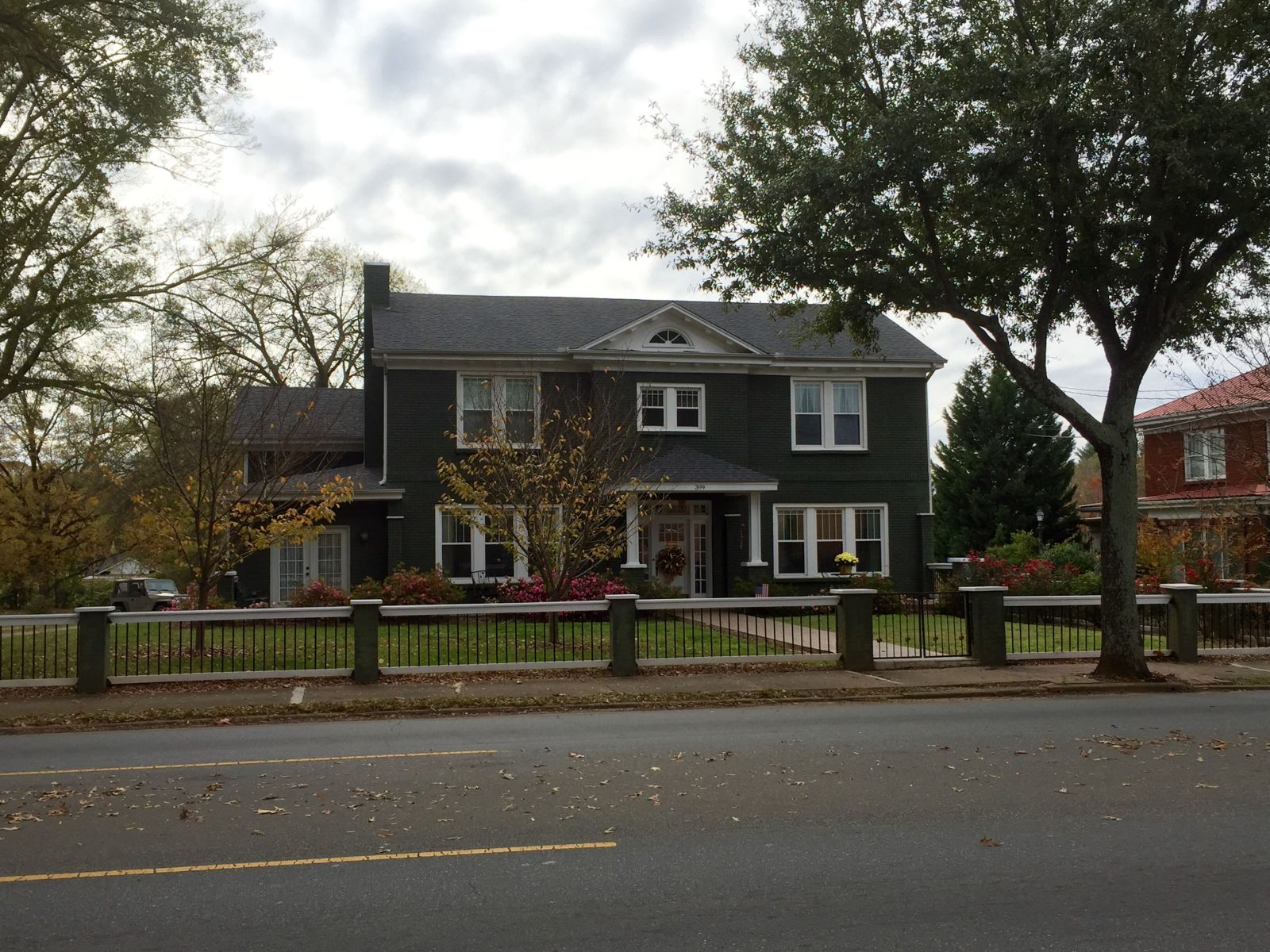
Biggerstaff-Griffin House, 2015

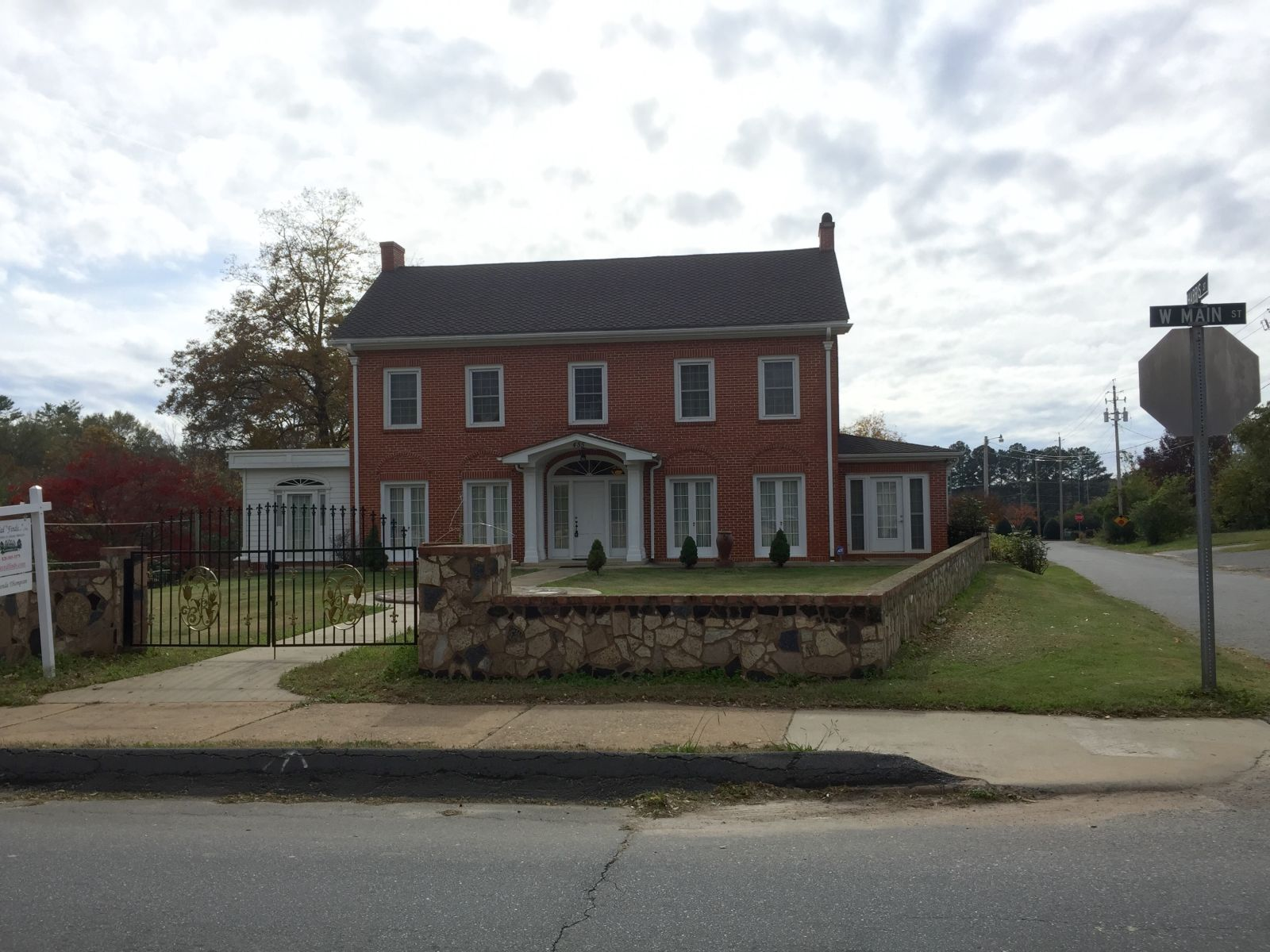
Amos C. and May B. Duncan House, 2015
