= Cedar Grove Lutheran Church =

Historic church in South Carolina, United States

- U.S. National Register of Historic Places
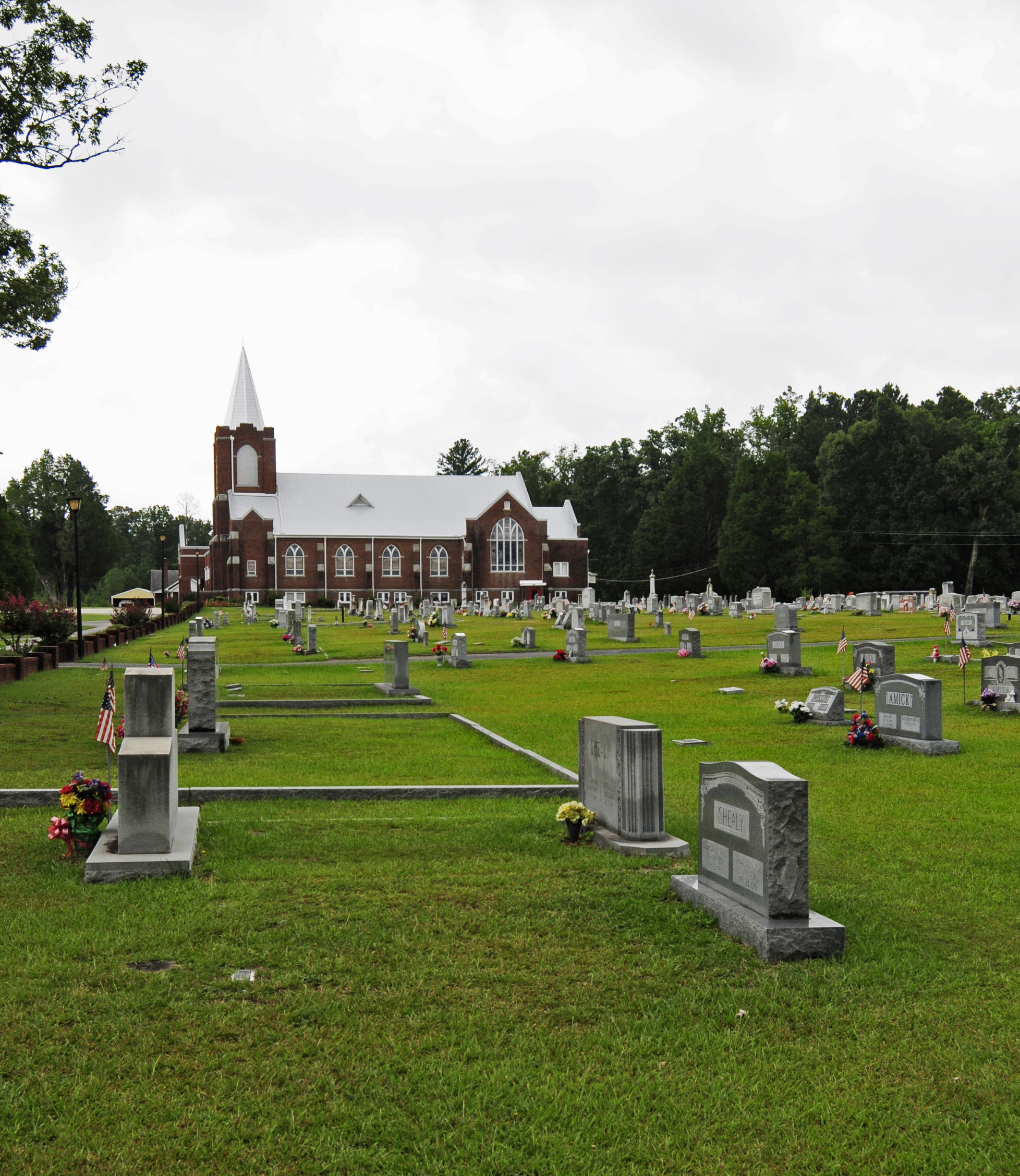
- Cedar Grove Lutheran Church, August 2012

- Location within South Carolina Location within the United States
- Location: 1220 Cedar Grove Rd., Batesburg-Leesville, South Carolina
- Coordinates: 33°59′13″N 81°27′35″W
- Area: 2 acres (0.81 ha)
- Built: c. 1926-1927
- Architect: Asbury, Louis H.
- Architectural style: Late Gothic Revival
- NRHP reference No.: 10000922
- Added to NRHP: November 17, 2010

Cedar Grove Lutheran Church is a historic Lutheran Church located at Batesburg-Leesville, Lexington County, South Carolina. It was designed by architect Louis H. Asbury built in 1926–1927. It is a Late Gothic Revival style brick building. It features a crenelated belfry topped by a multi-faceted metal shingle-clad spire.

It was listed on the National Register of Historic Places in 2010.
