= Charles E. Orr House =

Historic house in North Carolina, United States

- U.S. National Register of Historic Places
- U.S. Historic district – Contributing property
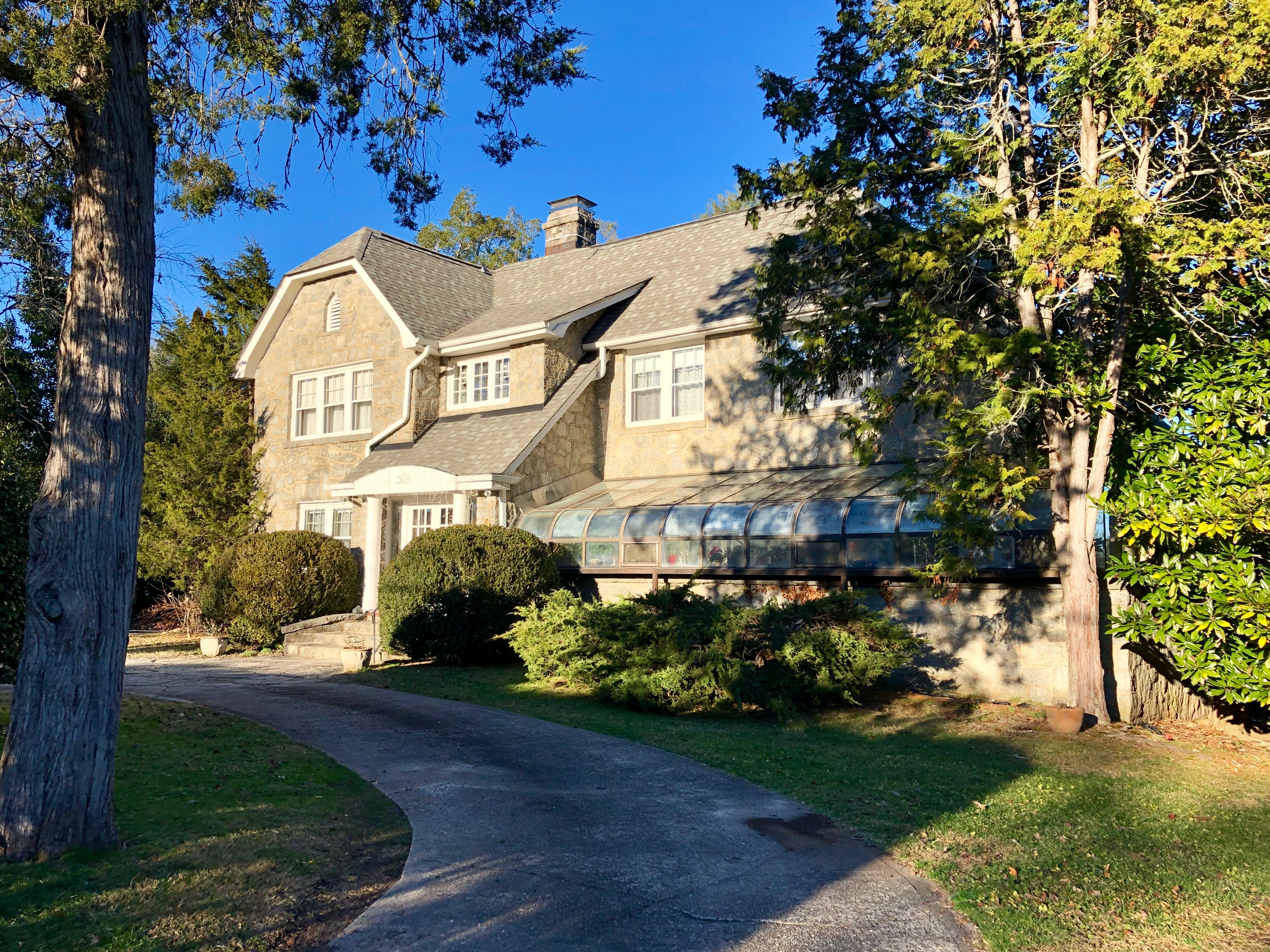
- Charles E. Orr House, January 2019

- Location within North Carolina Location within the United States
- Location: 269 E. Main St., Brevard, North Carolina
- Coordinates: 35°13′54″N 82°43′46″W
- Area: 1 acre (0.40 ha)
- Built: 1926
- Architectural style: Tudor Revival
- MPS: Transylvania County MPS
- NRHP reference No.: 06001108
- Added to NRHP: December 6, 2006

Charles E. Orr House is a historic home located at Brevard, Transylvania County, North Carolina. It was built in 1926, and is a two-story, Tudor Revival style dwelling of uncoursed rock-faced granite. It has a combination hip and clipped gable roof. Also on the property is a one-story, stone veneer cottage.

It was listed on the National Register of Historic Places in 2006. It is located in the East Main Street Historic District.
