= Commercial Building at 32 West Bridge Street =

Historic commercial building in New York, United States

- U.S. National Register of Historic Places
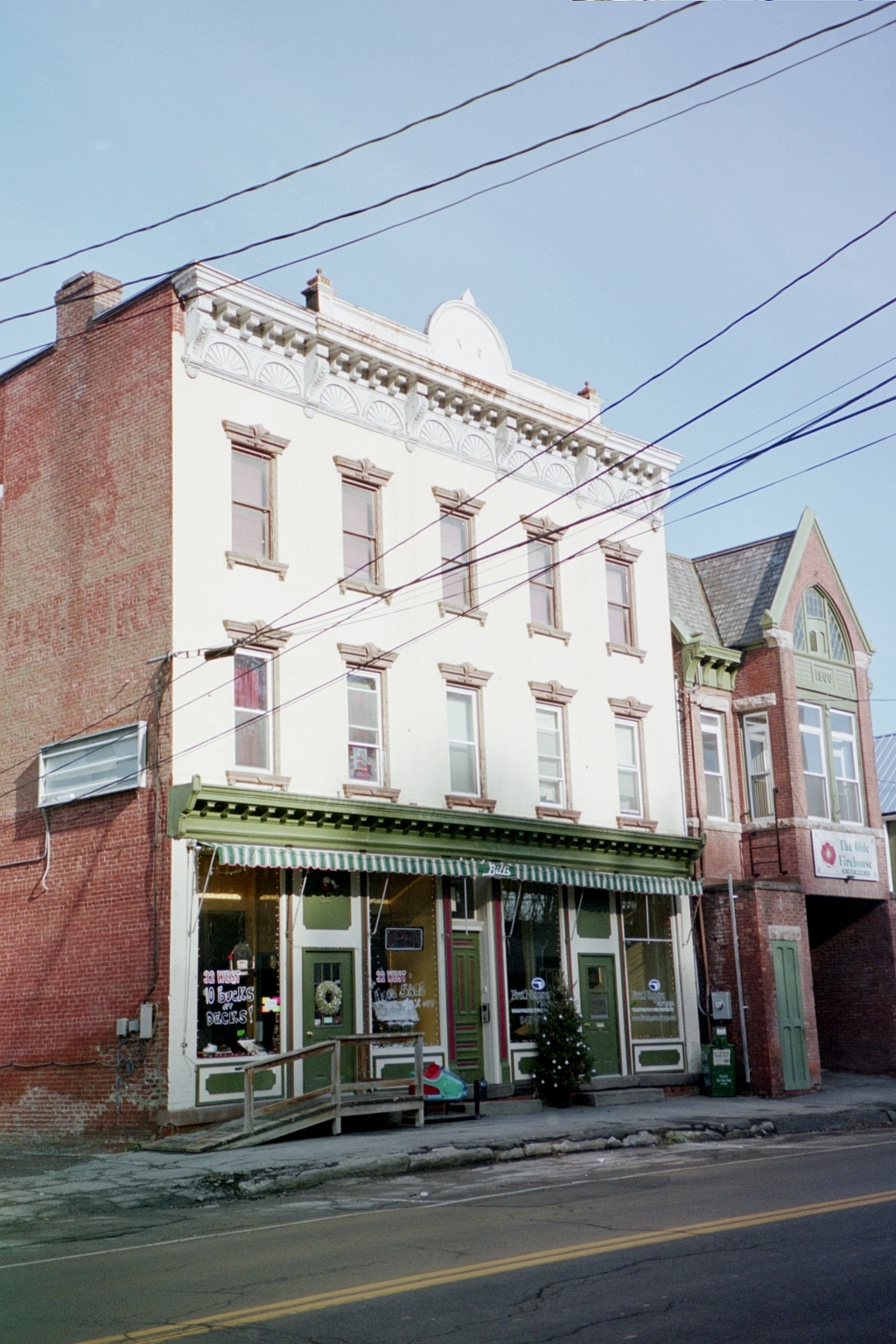

- Location within New York
- Location: Catskill, New York
- Coordinates: 42°13′1″N 73°52′12″W
- Built: 1890
- Architectural style: Italianate
- NRHP reference No.: 95000961
- Added to NRHP: August 10, 1995

The 32 West Bridge Street is a historic commercial building located in Catskill, New York, United States. It was completed in 1890, and is significant as a largely intact example of the Italianate architecture of that period. It was added to the National Register of Historic Places on August 10, 1995.
