= 112 Tryon Plaza =

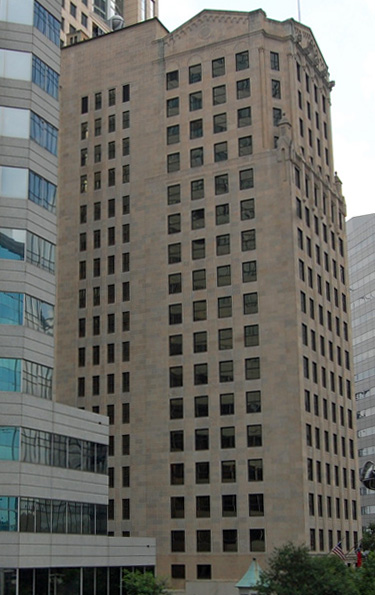
- Interactive map of the 112 Tryon Plaza area

General information
- Type: Office
- Location: 112 South Tryon Street; Charlotte, North Carolina
- Coordinates: 35.227°N 80.8438°W
- Completed: 1927
- Owner: Simpson Organization

Height
- Roof: 280 feet (85 m)

Technical details
- Floor count: 22
- Floor area: 151,815 sq ft (14,104.1 m^{2})

Design and construction
- Architects: Louis H. Asbury (1927); Odell Associates (1982)
- Structural engineer: Lockwood, Greene & Company (1927)

Other information
- Public transit access: Tryon Street

112 Tryon Plaza is a 280 feet (85 m) 22-story high-rise in Charlotte, North Carolina. It was the second tallest building in North Carolina when completed in 1927, and the tallest building in Charlotte for about 35 more years. It is currently the 21st tallest building in the city. Located on "The Square" at the corner of Trade St. and Tryon St. adjacent to a pocket park, this building has a premiere location in Uptown Charlotte, also known as Charlotte center city. In 2006 it was sold for $12 million to the Simpson Organization.

== History ==
In 1925, First National Bank president Henry McAden hired prominent Charlotte architect Louis H. Asbury, who had designed a home for him in 1916 in Myers Park. Engineering firm Lockwood, Greene & Company worked with Asbury.

The $1.8 million building opened September 9, 1927. Soon, the Charlotte branch of the Federal Reserve located on the nineteenth floor. First National Bank did not make enough of an effort to secure tenants, and the building was only 30 percent occupied in late 1930. This helped lead to the bank's failure on December 4 of that year.

By 1934, new owners had doubled the building's occupancy, and the Federal Reserve branch took over the lower floors. In 1942, the building's name changed to The Liberty Life Building. The Federal Reserve had moved to its own building by this time.

In 1964, the name changed again, to The Baugh Building. A modern facade was added. By 1976, the Bank of North Carolina Building, as it was being called, was half empty.

In 1982 SYNCO Inc. spent $11 million on renovations, including the entrances, and adding a 20-story addition in back, with Odell Associates the architectural firm.

On December 17, 2007, the Charlotte City Council designated the First National Bank Building as a historic landmark.

In 2007, the building was converted to an office condominium and renamed to simply Tryon Plaza. Numerous improvements were made to the building by the developer including a complete facade renovation; a restoration of the original bank board room which features wood paneled walls, a ceiling with ornate plaster carvings, and a stained glass window; the addition of a multi-room conference center with a catering kitchen; the addition of a full gym facility with locker rooms, steam rooms, and a spa services room; and the addition of storage units on the lower level. Valet parking and a full service concierge have been added to complete the full service offering of this boutique office condominium.

== See also ==
- List of tallest buildings in Charlotte

== External sources ==
- Emporis
- Skyscraperpage
- Charlotte Business Journal
- TryonPlazaBrochure
- Survey and Research Report for First National Bank Building for Historic Landmark Designation by Charlotte-Mecklenburg Historic Landmarks Commission

Preceded by Johnston Building	Tallest Building in Charlotte; 1926–1961; 85 m	Succeeded by 200 South Tryon
