= Bishop John C. Kilgo House =

Historic house in North Carolina, United States

- U.S. National Register of Historic Places
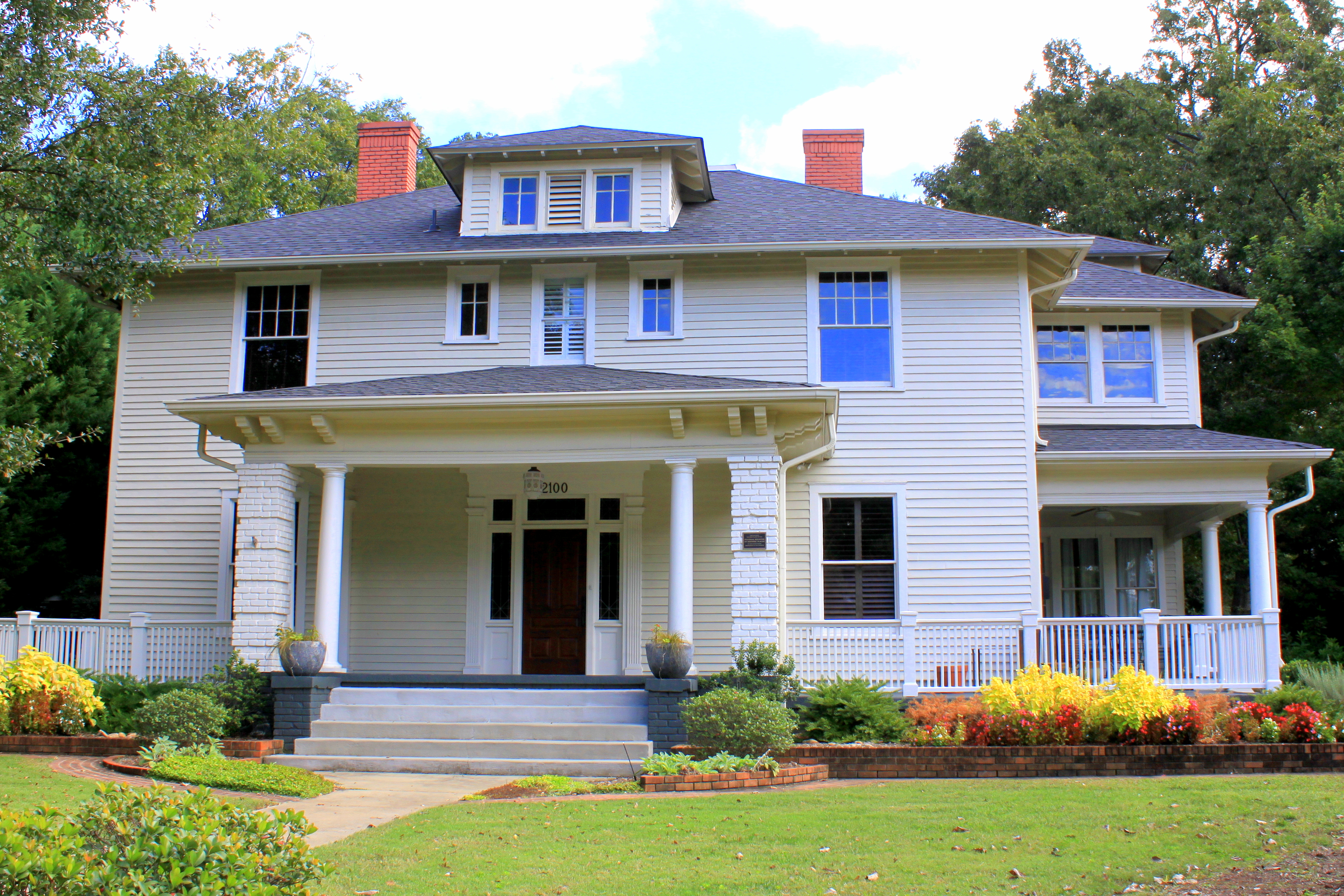

- Location within North Carolina Location within the United States
- Location: 2100 The Plaza, Charlotte, North Carolina
- Coordinates: 35°13′47″N 80°48′31″W
- Area: 0.4 acres (0.16 ha)
- Built: 1915
- Architect: Asbury, Louis H.
- Architectural style: Colonial Revival, Bungalow/craftsman
- NRHP reference No.: 08001364
- Added to NRHP: January 22, 2009

Bishop John C. Kilgo House is a historic home located at Charlotte, Mecklenburg County, North Carolina. It was built in 1915, and is a two-story, three-bay, frame dwelling with Colonial Revival and Bungalow / American Craftsman design elements. It has a hipped roof, cubic main block with a later, 1950s rear, two-story, two-bay, gable-roofed addition. The front facade features a center bay, one-story entry porch with Tuscan order columns. It was built for Bishop John C. Kilgo (1861–1922), bishop of the Methodist Episcopal Church, South.

It was listed on the National Register of Historic Places in 2009.
