= Rutherford County Courthouse (North Carolina) =

- U.S. National Register of Historic Places
- U.S. Historic district – Contributing property
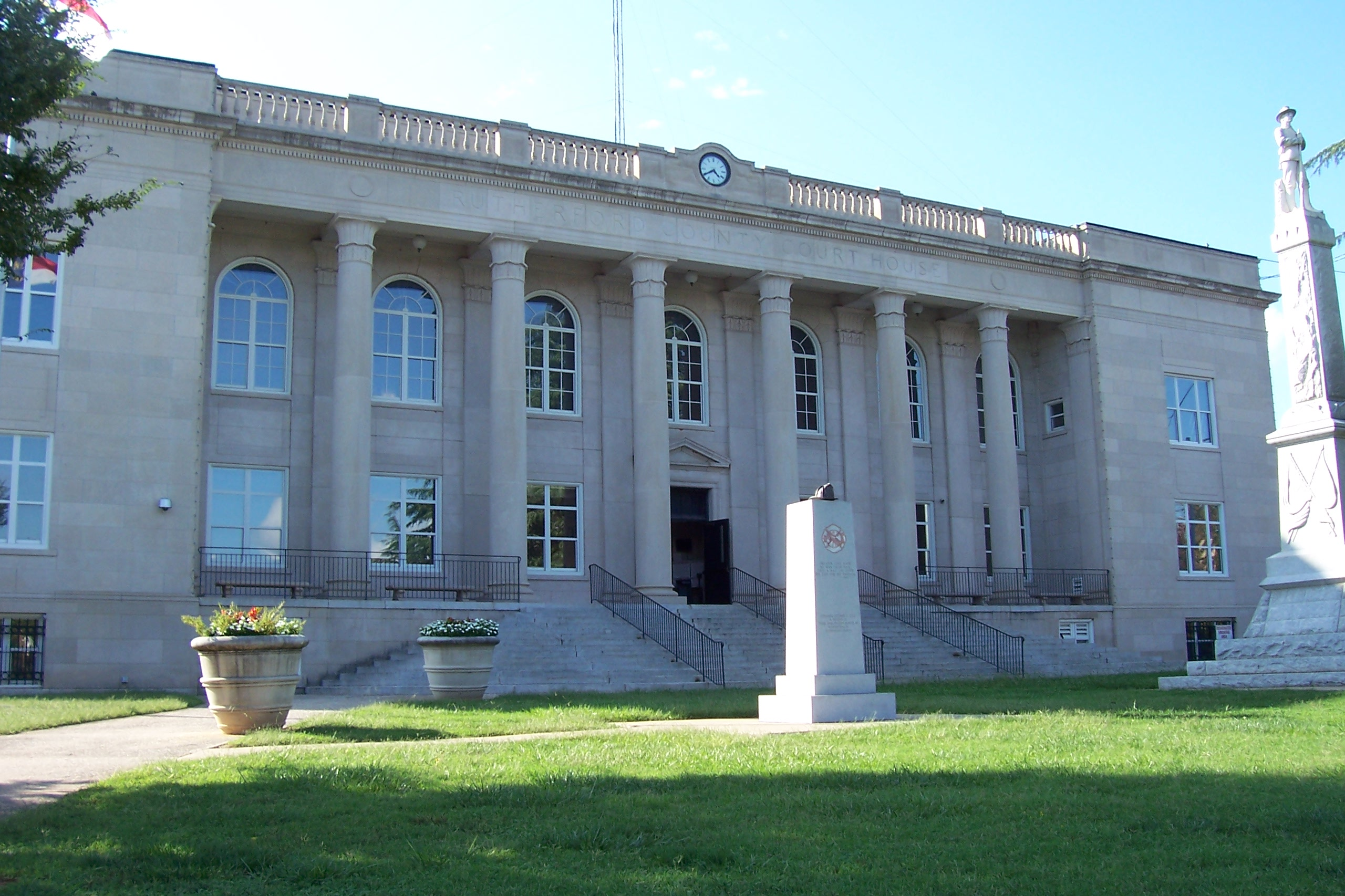
- Rutherford County Courthouse, September 2011

- Location within North Carolina Location within the United States
- Location: Main St. between 2nd and 3rd Sts., Rutherfordton, North Carolina
- Coordinates: 35°22′3″N 81°57′28″W
- Area: 1.5 acres (0.61 ha)
- Built: 1925
- Architect: Louis H. Asbury
- Architectural style: Renaissance Revival
- MPS: North Carolina County Courthouses TR
- NRHP reference No.: 79001749
- Added to NRHP: May 10, 1979

Rutherford County Courthouse is a historic courthouse located at Rutherfordton, Rutherford County, North Carolina. It was designed by architect Louis H. Asbury and built in 1925–1926. It is a two-story, Renaissance Revival style building faced with a smooth stone veneer. The front facade features an octopus style portico in antis.

It was added to the National Register of Historic Places in 1979. It is located in the Main Street Historic District.
