= Governor's Inn =

- U.S. National Register of Historic Places
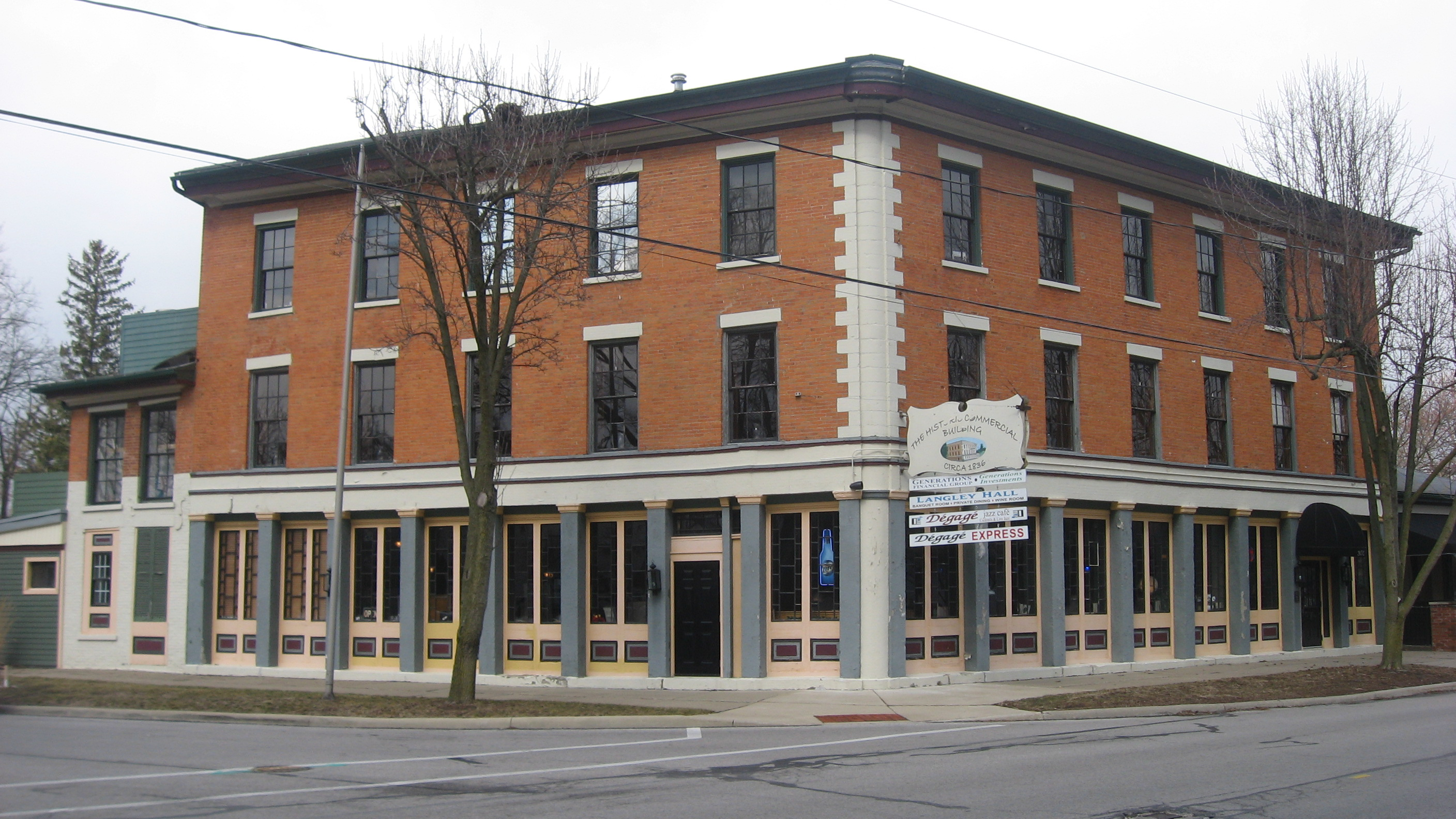
- Southern side and front

- Location within Ohio Location within the United States
- Location: 301 River Rd., Maumee, Ohio
- Coordinates: 41°33′52″N 83°38′46″W
- Area: 1 acre (0.40 ha)
- Built: 1836
- NRHP reference No.: 74001557
- Added to NRHP: October 18, 1974

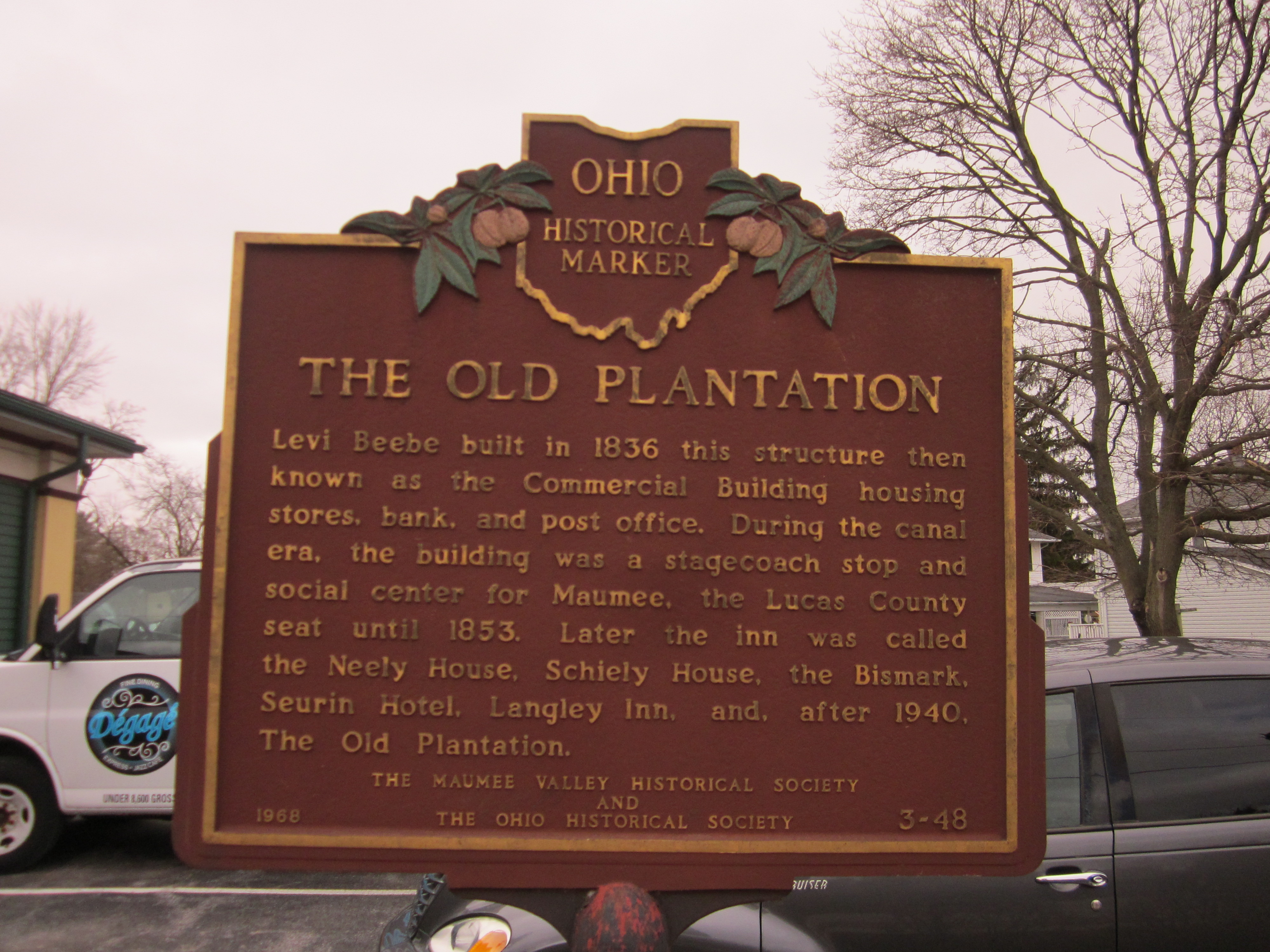
Historic Plaque at the Governor's Inn

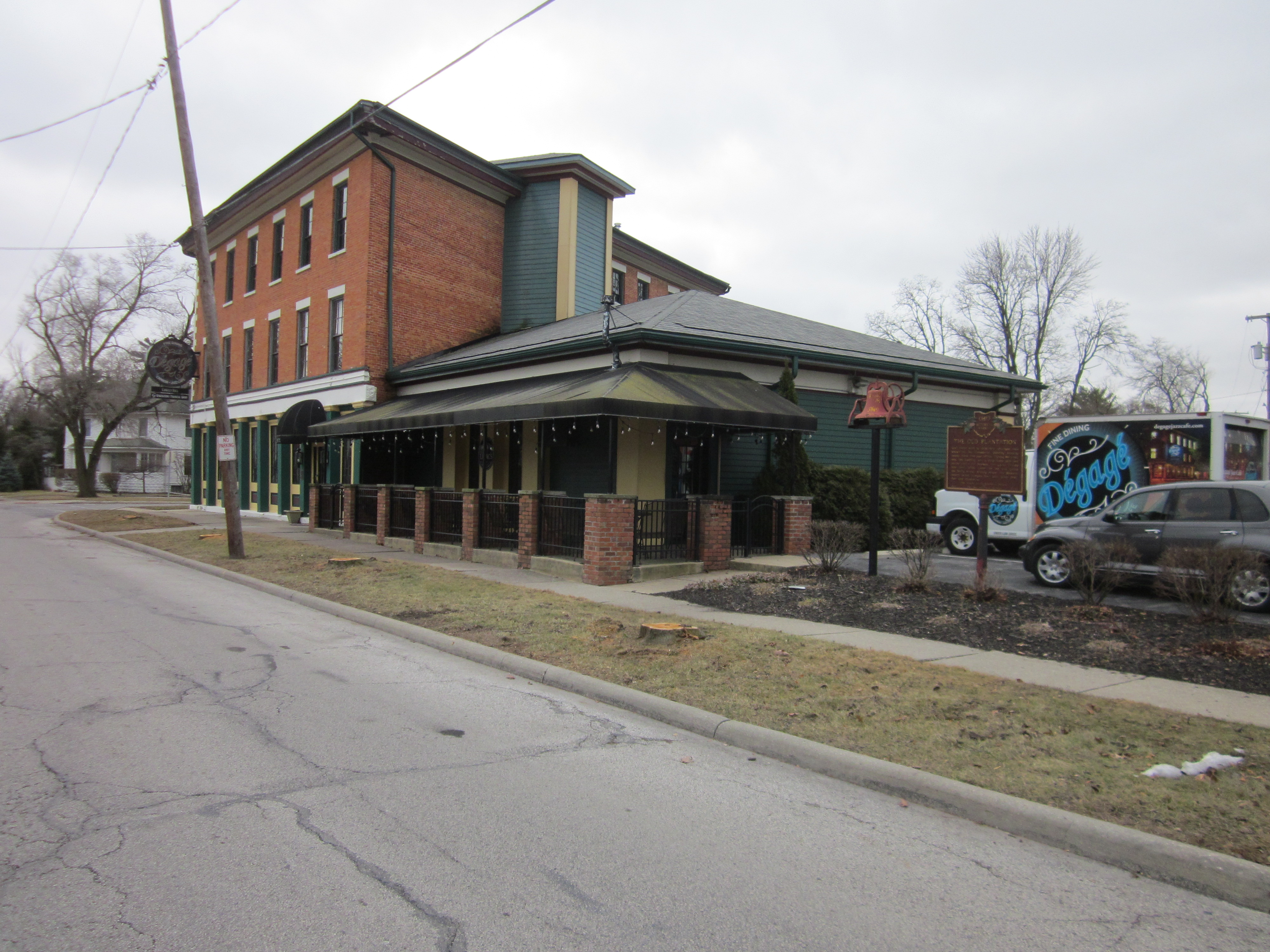

Governor's Inn is a historic inn at Maumee, Ohio, United States. It was built in 1836 by Levi Beebe. Before it served as an inn, the building was named the Commercial Building and held local stores and a post office. When the Miami and Erie Canal opened, it became a lodge for canal and stagecoach travelers. The inn went by many names before the Governor's Inn, including the Neely House, the Eagle, the Schieley House, the Bismark, the Seurin Hotel, the Langley Inn, and the Old Plantation Inn. It is now home to a whisky bar.

In 1974, the Governor's Inn was listed on the National Register of Historic Places, qualifying because of its historically significant architecture. It was the fifth place in Maumee to receive this designation.
