= Max and Claire Brombacher House =

Historic house in North Carolina, United States

- U.S. National Register of Historic Places
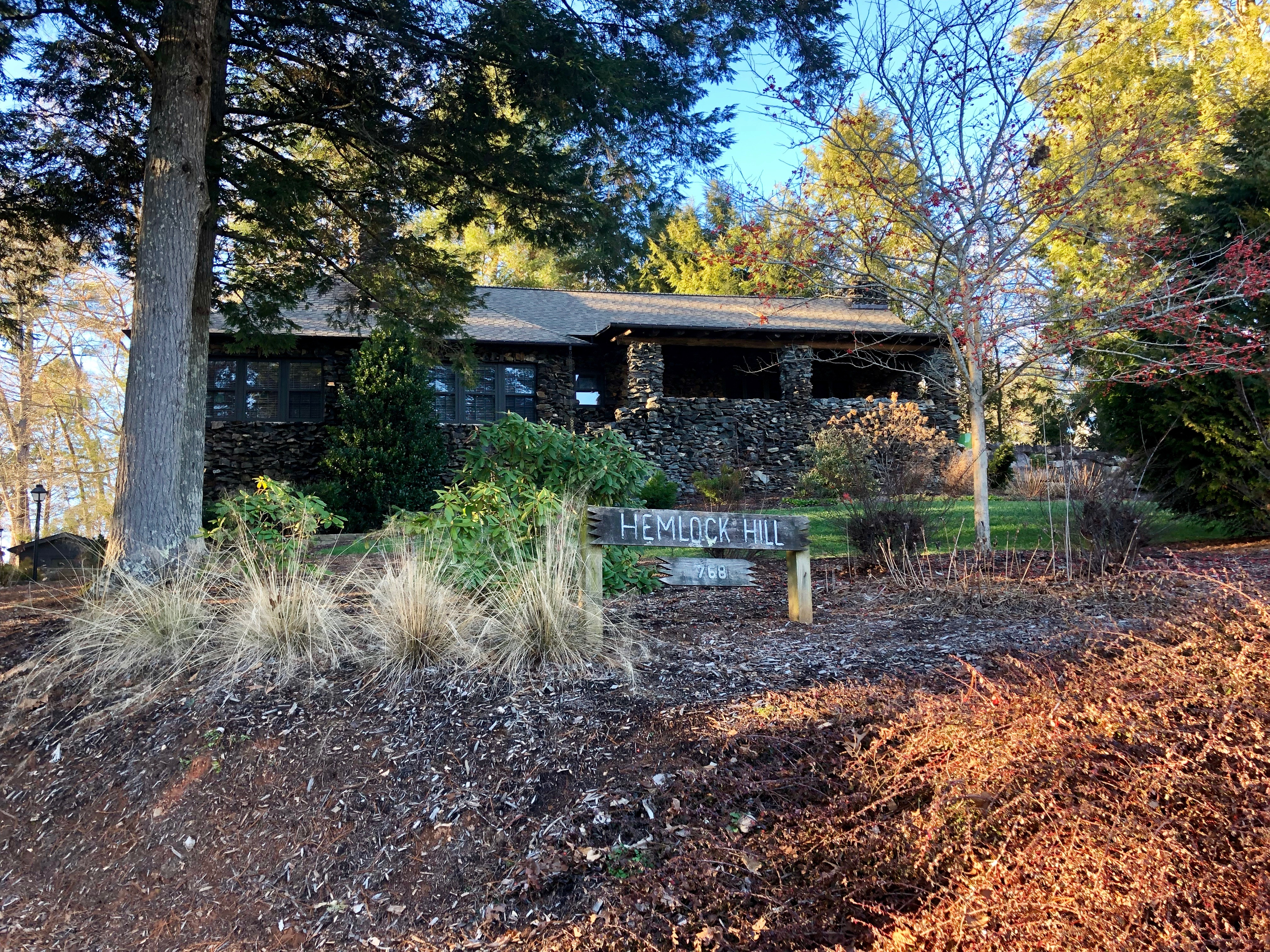

- Location within North Carolina Location within the United States
- Location: 768 E. Main St., Brevard, North Carolina
- Coordinates: 35°13′31″N 82°43′42″W
- Area: less than one acre
- Built: 1940
- Built by: Wright, William Benjamin; et al.
- Architectural style: rustic
- NRHP reference No.: 01001111
- Added to NRHP: October 15, 2001

Max and Claire Brombacher House, also known as Hemlock Hill, is a historic home located at Brevard, Transylvania County, North Carolina. It was built in 1940, and is a one-story, rectangular, Rustic style stone dwelling. It has a pyramidal roof over the south block and a side-gable over the north wing. It was constructed of irregular, jagged-edge stones by local stonemasons.

It was listed on the National Register of Historic Places in 2001.
