= Eastover (Salisbury, North Carolina) =

Historic house in North Carolina, United States

- U.S. National Register of Historic Places
- Location within North Carolina Location within the United States
- Location: 5510 S. Main St., Salisbury, North Carolina
- Coordinates: 35°36′31″N 80°32′28″W
- Area: 25.12 acres (10.17 ha)
- Built: 1934-1935
- Architect: Asbury, Louis H.
- Architectural style: Tudor Revival, Craftsman
- NRHP reference No.: 10001176
- Added to NRHP: January 24, 2011

Eastover is a historic estate located at Salisbury, Rowan County, North Carolina. The mansion was designed by architect Louis H. Asbury (1877-1975) in 1934, and built between 1934 and 1935. It is a 2 1/2-story, Tudor Revival-style brick dwelling with decorative half-timbering with stucco fields and a dull red terra cotta tile roof. Other contributing resources are the estate grounds, entrance gate (c. 1935), and one-story frame American Craftsman-style well-house.

It was added to the National Register of Historic Places in 2011.
