= Commercial Building at 500 North Tryon Street =

Historic building in North Carolina, US

- U.S. National Register of Historic Places
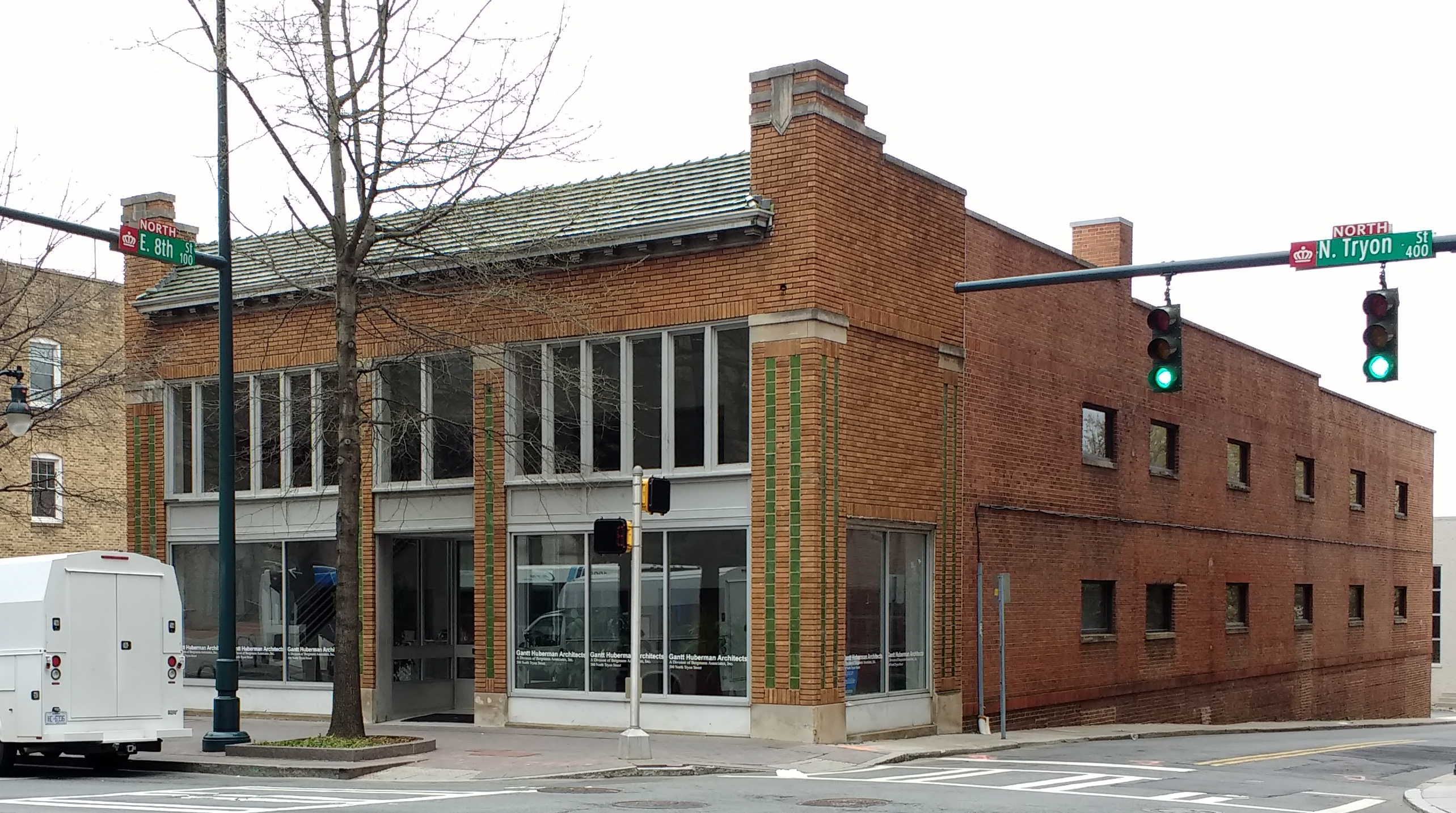

- Location within North Carolina Location within the United States
- Location: 500 N. Tryon St. Charlotte, North Carolina
- Coordinates: 35°13′48″N 80°50′18″W
- Area: 0.5 acres (0.20 ha)
- Built: 1921
- Architect: Asbury, Louis
- Architectural style: Commercial
- NRHP reference No.: 92001615
- Added to NRHP: November 20, 1992

Commercial Building at 500 North Tryon Street is a historic commercial building located at Charlotte, Mecklenburg County, North Carolina. It was designed by architect Louis H. Asbury and built in 1921. It is a two-story with full basement, rectangular building with load-bearing brick walls. It measures approximately 46 feet in width and 146 feet in depth. The building originally housed an automobile dealership.

It was added to the National Register of Historic Places in 1992.
