= National Register of Historic Places listings in Transylvania County, North Carolina =

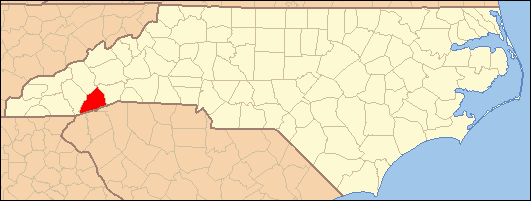

This list includes properties and districts listed on the National Register of Historic Places in Transylvania County, North Carolina. Click the "Map of all coordinates" link to the right to view an online map of all properties and districts with latitude and longitude coordinates in the table below.

== Current listings ==
This National Park Service list is complete through NPS recent listings posted May 15, 2026.

	Name on the Register	Image	Date listed	Location	City or town	Description
1	E. M. Backus Lodge	E. M. Backus Lodge	June 9, 1988 (#88000689)	Cold Mountain Gap Rd. 35°09′38″N 82°59′51″W	Lake Toxaway	Extends into Jackson County
2	Biltmore Forest School	Biltmore Forest School	November 19, 1974 (#74001377)	NW of Brevard off U.S. 276 in Pisgah National Forest; 35°21′04″N 82°46′52″W	Brevard	
3	Blue Ridge Parkway	Blue Ridge Parkway	December 13, 2024 (#100011353)	Blue Ridge Parkway through Virginia and North Carolina; 35°19′00″N 82°51′28″W	Brevard vicinity	
4	William Breese Jr. House	William Breese Jr. House	June 23, 1983 (#83001920)	401 E. Main St. 35°13′53″N 82°43′45″W	Brevard	
5	Brevard College Stone Fence and Gate	Brevard College Stone Fence and Gate	December 21, 1993 (#93001436)	Jct. of N. Broad St. and French Broad Ave., NW corner 35°14′12″N 82°43′55″W	Brevard	
6	Max and Claire Brombacher House	Max and Claire Brombacher House	October 15, 2001 (#01001111)	571 E. Main St. 35°13′30″N 82°43′43″W	Brevard	
7	William Deaver House	William Deaver House	August 13, 1979 (#79001755)	N of Pisgah Forest on NC 280; 35°16′34″N 82°42′07″W	Pisgah Forest	
8	East Main Street Historic District	East Main Street Historic District	August 20, 2009 (#09000638)	249-683 and 768 East Main St.; 6-7 Rice St.; St. Phillip's Ln.; 1-60 Woodside Dr.; and 33 Deacon Ln. 35°13′45″N 82°43′42″W	Brevard	
9	Flem Galloway House	Flem Galloway House	February 24, 1995 (#95000137)	NC 1388 W side, 2 miles S of jct. with NC 1129; 35°09′17″N 82°48′41″W	Calvert	
10	Godfrey-Barnette House	Godfrey-Barnette House	December 30, 1993 (#93001437)	503 S. Broad St. 35°13′37″N 82°44′15″W	Brevard	
11	William H. Grogan House	William H. Grogan House	September 10, 2008 (#08000890)	24 Warren La. 35°13′38″N 82°43′15″W	Brevard	
12	Hanckel-Barclay House	Hanckel-Barclay House	December 9, 1999 (#99001495)	0.8 miles W of Jct. NC 1114 and US 276; 35°11′41″N 82°43′53″W	Brevard	Boundary increased on July 20, 2000
13	Hillmont	Hillmont	October 16, 1986 (#86002871)	W side of Lake Toxaway 3 miles N of US 64; 35°08′27″N 82°57′10″W	Lake Toxaway	
14	Lake Toxaway Methodist Church	Lake Toxaway Methodist Church	February 18, 1994 (#94000033)	Cold Mountain Rd. N side, 0.1 miles NW of jct. with NC 281; 35°08′22″N 82°55′59″W	Lake Toxaway	
15	Main Street Historic District	Main Street Historic District	September 6, 2002 (#02000945)	Roughly bounded by Gaston St., England St., Probart St., and Jordan St. 35°13′59″N 82°44′04″W	Brevard	
16	McMinn Building	McMinn Building	February 18, 1994 (#94000034)	2-6 W. Main St. 35°14′02″N 82°44′04″W	Brevard	
17	Morgan's Mill		August 16, 1979 (#79001753)	SW of Brevard on SR 1331; 35°10′17″N 82°48′41″W	Brevard	
18	Royal and Louise Morrow House	Royal and Louise Morrow House	December 6, 2006 (#06001107)	630 E. Main St. 35°13′36″N 82°43′40″W	Brevard	
19	Charles E. Orr House	Charles E. Orr House	December 6, 2006 (#06001108)	269 E. Main St. 35°13′54″N 82°43′46″W	Brevard	
20	Elizur and Ann Patton House		May 21, 2026 (#100013050)	1699 Old Hendersonville Highway; 35°15′16″N 82°41′58″W	Brevard	
21	St. Philip's Episcopal Church	St. Philip's Episcopal Church	December 30, 1997 (#97001594)	317 E. Main St. 35°13′54″N 82°43′51″W	Brevard	
22	Dillard B. and Georgia Sewell House	Dillard B. and Georgia Sewell House	April 15, 2015 (#15000164)	64 Clipper Ln. 35°15′36″N 82°36′15″W	Penrose	Extends into Henderson County
23	Silvermont	Silvermont	July 9, 1981 (#81000427)	E. Main St. 35°13′44″N 82°43′47″W	Brevard	
24	Transylvania County Courthouse	Transylvania County Courthouse	May 10, 1979 (#79001754)	N. Broad and E. Main St. 35°14′01″N 82°44′01″W	Brevard	

== See also ==
- Biltmore Estate
- Biltmore Village
- National Register of Historic Places listings in North Carolina
- List of National Historic Landmarks in North Carolina
