= WHLC =

Radio station in Highlands, North Carolina

- Highlands, North Carolina; United States
- Broadcast area: Greenville/Spartanburg/Asheville market
- Frequency: 104.5 MHz
- Branding: WHLC FM 104.5

Programming
- Format: Easy listening

Ownership
- Owner: Charisma Radio Corp.

History
- First air date: 1993
- Call sign meaning: Highlands, Cashiers or Carolinas

Technical information
- Licensing authority: FCC
- Facility ID: 10351
- Class: A
- ERP: 460 watts
- HAAT: 353 m (1,158 ft)
- Transmitter coordinates: 35°3′40.00″N 83°11′5.00″W
- Translator: See below

Links
- Public license information: Public file; LMS
- Webcast: Listen Live
- Website: whlc.com

WHLC FM 104.5 is a radio station covering a small area where Georgia and the Carolinas meet. Owned by Charisma Radio Corp. (Wanda and Chuck Cooper) and based in Highlands, North Carolina (also its city of license), its studios are just north of the historic downtown on the Cashiers Road (U.S. 64). The transmitter is nearby, and operates at 460 watts effective radiated power. The station went on the air in mid-1993.

According to FCC maps, WHLC covers the southwestern half of Macon County (including Franklin), the southern half of Jackson County (including Cashiers) to the east, the southwestern corner of Transylvania County (as far as Lake Toxaway) further east, the far northwestern tip of South Carolina (as far south as Walhalla) to the south and southeast, and the eastern half of Rabun County, Georgia (out to Clayton) to the southwest. According to the station's own map, coverage extends much further to the south and southeast, covering the greater Greenville area.

WHLC plays easy listening music dating back to the 1950s, including instrumental versions of soft rock tunes, with a target audience of over-35 listeners. It is the only full-service station licensed to Highlands, although the town's location on a high plateau allows people to receive other stations from Asheville, and as far away as northeastern metro Atlanta. Also licensed to Highlands is W277CU, which retransmits WFQS from Western North Carolina Public Radio in Asheville.

== Translators ==
As of February 2014, WHLC has one broadcast translator station on air, also located in Highlands. The initial permit (November 1996) had callsign W279AH on 103.7, then W277AL on 103.3 (May 2001), from a different location than the main station on the southwest edge of the Highlands city limit. It obtained a construction permit at the same location to change to 95.7, lower the antenna by about 10 meters, and increase to 75 watts. (This superseded an application to stay at the original height but at 25 watts.) The new callsign, W239AN, was issued in July 2007. It then became W293BX on 106.5, granted in late 2011 and licensed in early 2012 (trading channels with W239CB on 95.7 in nearby Cashiers). It is unclear why this station is necessary or even useful, since it is now on the same tower as the main station.

Call sign	Frequency	City of license	FID	ERP (W)	HAAT	Class	FCC info
W239CB	95.7 FM	Cashiers, North Carolina	142620	250	404 m (1,325 ft)	D	LMS
W249CY	97.7 FM	Lake Toxaway, North Carolina	142647	9	538.8 m (1,768 ft)	D	LMS
W245DS	98.9 FM	Franklin, North Carolina	142796	40	−138.4 m (−454 ft)	D	LMS

In 2003, Charisma also made applications for 106.5 in Cashiers, 97.1 in Lake Toxaway, 99.1 in Franklin, and 105.3 in "Scaly" (Scaly Mountain) in North Carolina, and for 94.9 in Easley and 101.7 in Greenville, South Carolina. The FCC took a decade to approve these, with Scaly and Cashiers approved in May 2013, and Toxaway and Franklin in early January 2014. Prior to FCC approval, the applications for the Highlands and Cashiers stations swapped frequencies, while Franklin was amended to go down by one channel. The applications for the two stations in South Carolina were never approved.
