= Toxaway =

Toxaway may refer to:

- The Toxaway River, a river in North Carolina and South Carolina in the United States
- Lake Toxaway, a lake in North Carolina in the United States
- Toxaway Lake (Idaho)
- Lake Toxaway, North Carolina, a community in Transylvania County, North Carolina, in the United States
- Lake Toxaway Methodist Church, an historic church in Lake Toxaway, North Carolina, in the United States
- The Keowee-Toxaway State Natural Area, a state park in Pickens County, South Carolina, in the United States
- USS Toxaway (SP-743), a United States Navy patrol boat in commission from 1917 to 1918
