= Lake Toxaway (disambiguation) =

Lake Toxaway may mean:

== Lakes ==
- Lake Toxaway, a reservoir in Transylvania County, North Carolina
- Toxaway Lake (Idaho), a glacial lake in Custer County, Idaho

== Communities ==
- Lake Toxaway, North Carolina, an unincorporated community in Transylvania County, North Carolina
