= Dillard B. and Georgia Sewell House =

Historic house in North Carolina, United States

- U.S. National Register of Historic Places
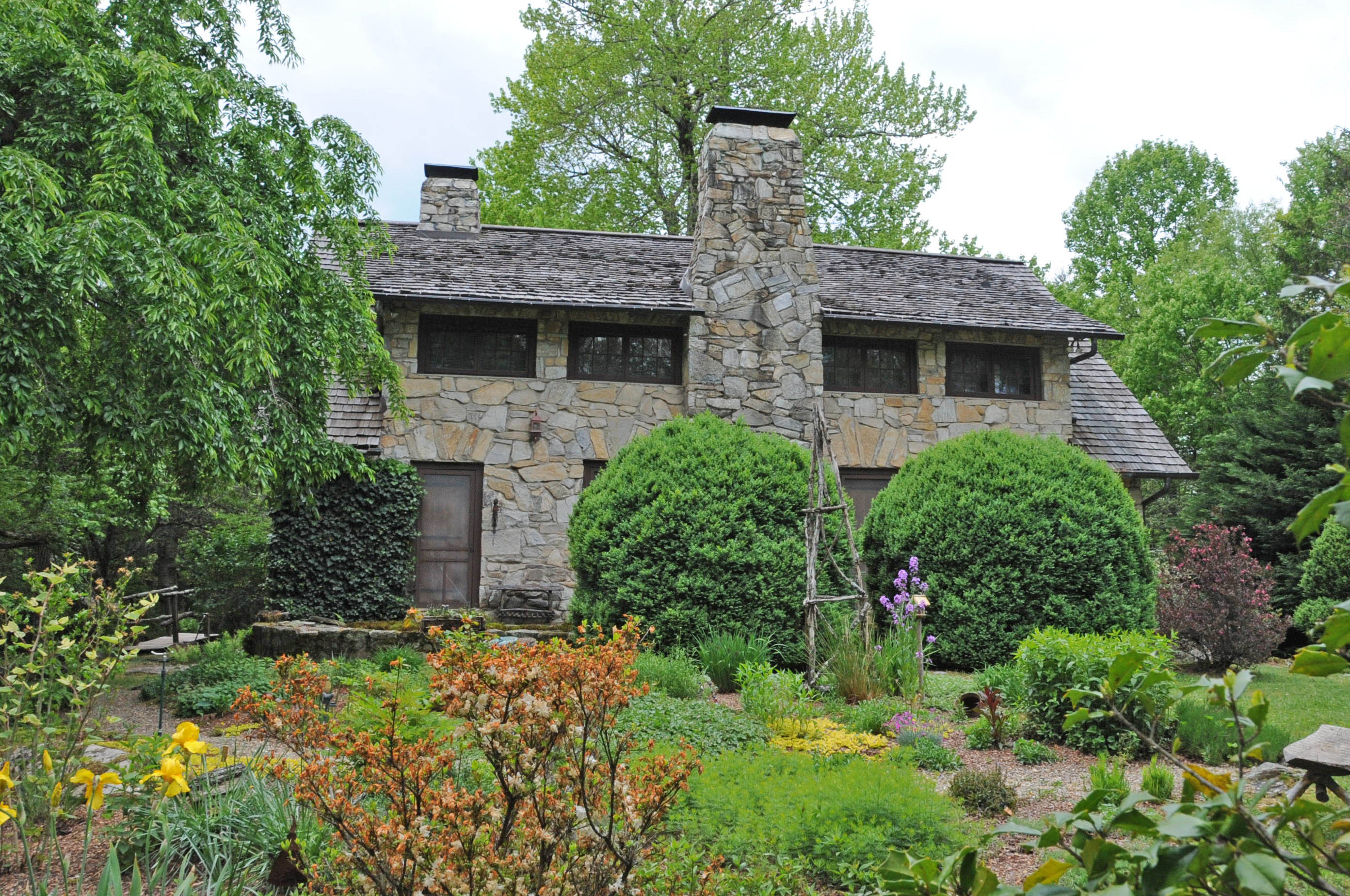

- Location within North Carolina Location within the United States
- Location: 64 Clipper Ln., Penrose, North Carolina
- Coordinates: 35°15′36″N 82°36′15″W
- Area: 9 acres (3.6 ha)
- Built: 1924
- Architectural style: Rustic Revival
- NRHP reference No.: 15000164
- Added to NRHP: April 15, 2015

The Dillard B. and Georgia Sewell House is a historic summer house at 64 Clipper Lane in western Henderson County, North Carolina. It is a 1 1/2-story rustic stone structure, with a wood shake roof and a full-width porch fronting a stone patio. It is located southeast of Penrose, atop Jeter Mountain on a 9-acre (3.6 ha) parcel straddling the county line between Henderson and Transylvania Counties. The house was built in 1924 for Dillard Sewell, an insurance company executive from Charleston, South Carolina, and his wife Georgia. It is a well-preserved example of Rustic Revival architecture.

The property was listed on the National Register of Historic Places in April 2015.

== See also ==
- National Register of Historic Places listings in Henderson County, North Carolina
- National Register of Historic Places listings in Transylvania County, North Carolina
