= Barnett House =

Barnett House may refer to:

- Barnett-Attwood House, New Edinburg, Arkansas, listed on the National Register of Historic Places listings in Cass County, Arkansas
- Tupper-Barnett House, Washington, Georgia, listed on the NRHP in Georgia
- Ida B. Wells-Barnett House, Chicago, Illinois, listed on the NRHP in Illinois
- Thompson Barnett House, Logansport, Indiana, listed on the National Register of Historic Places listings in Cass County, Indiana
- Barnett-Seawright-Wilson House, Delphi, Indiana, listed on the National Register of Historic Places listings in Carroll County, Indiana
- Godfrey-Barnette House, Brevard, North Carolina, listed on the National Register of Historic Places in Transylvania County, North Carolina
- Barnett-Criss House, Cambridge, Ohio, listed on the NRHP in Ohio
- William Barnett House, Alleghany Springs, Virginia, listed on the National Register of Historic Places in Montgomery County, Virginia
- Barnett House (Elliston, Virginia), listed on the National Register of Historic Places in Montgomery County, Virginia
- Alonzo and Louise Barnett House, Spokane, Washington, listed on the National Register of Historic Places in Spokane County, Washington
