= William Deaver House =

Historic house in North Carolina, United States

- U.S. National Register of Historic Places
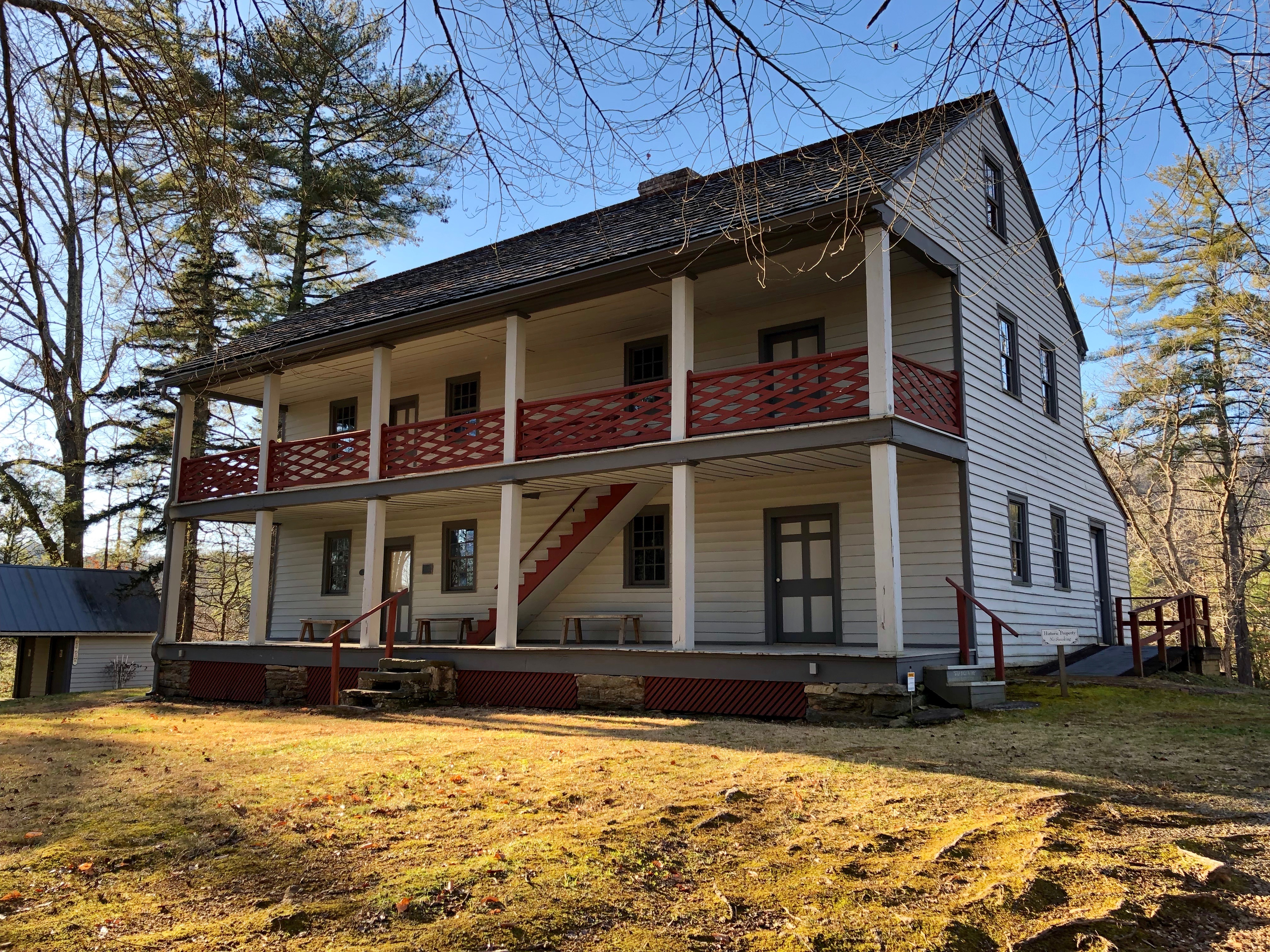
- William Deaver House, January 2019

- Location within North Carolina Location within the United States
- Location: N of Pisgah Forest on NC 280, near Pisgah Forest, North Carolina
- Coordinates: 35°16′34″N 82°42′7″W
- Area: 2.3 acres (0.93 ha)
- Built: c. 1832
- Architectural style: Georgian, Retarditaire Georgian
- NRHP reference No.: 79001755
- Added to NRHP: August 13, 1979

William Deaver House is a historic home located near Pisgah Forest, Transylvania County, North Carolina. It was built about 1832, and is a two-story, heavy timber frame Georgian style dwelling. It is sheathed in weatherboard and has a gable roof. The front facade features a double-gallery engaged porch.

It was listed on the National Register of Historic Places in 1979.
