= Hillmont (Lake Toxaway, North Carolina) =

Historic house in North Carolina, United States

- U.S. National Register of Historic Places
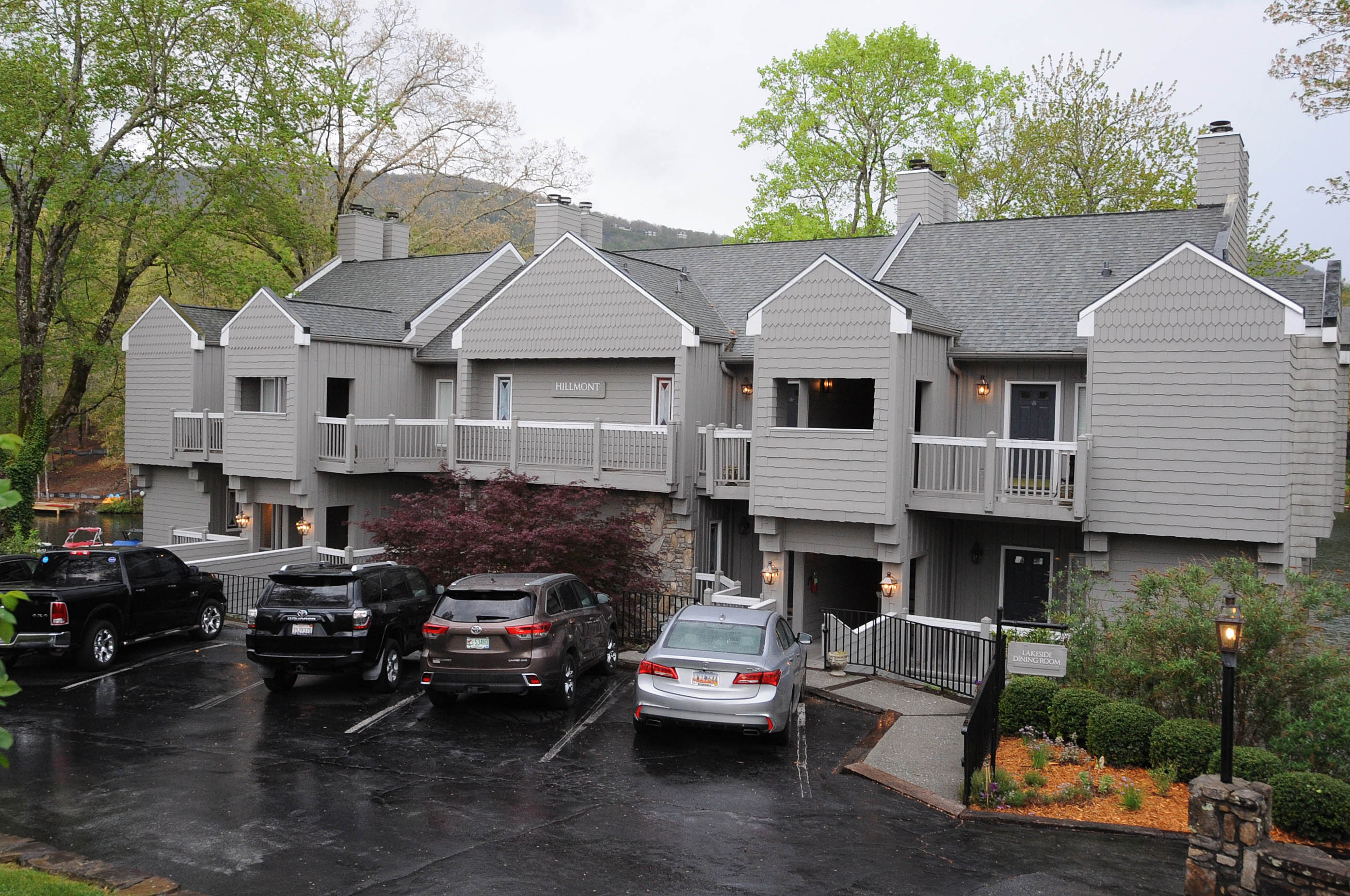

- Location within North Carolina Location within the United States
- Location: W side of Lake Toxaway 3 mi. N of US 64, Lake Toxaway, North Carolina
- Coordinates: 35°8′27″N 82°57′10″W
- Area: 2 acres (0.81 ha)
- Built: 1915
- NRHP reference No.: 86002871
- Added to NRHP: October 16, 1986

Hillmont, also known as the Armstrong-Moltz House and Greystone Inn, is a historic home located at Lake Toxaway, Transylvania County, North Carolina. It was built about 1915, and is a large 2 1/2-story, board and batten sheathed square block with two rambling stone additions. It features flower boxes on all windows, balconies, and casement windows, which give an impression of Swiss-chalet design. It was rehabilitated as the Greystone Inn in the mid-1980s.

It was listed on the National Register of Historic Places in 1986.

After closing in 2015, the Greystone Inn was purchased by Geoff and Shannon Ellis in 2017. The new owners renovated the Greystone Inn during the winter and spring of 2018 to bring the inn back to its former glory, and reopened the inn to the public in May 2018. The Greystone Inn is open year-round with 30 guest rooms, a lakeside restaurant, and a full-service spa.
