= Barclay House =

Barclay House may refer to:

- Barclay Farm House, Cherry Hill, New Jersey
- Hanckel-Barclay House, Brevard, North Carolina
- Barclay–Klum House, Ashland, Oregon, listed on the National Register of Historic Places
- Dr. Forbes Barclay House, Oregon City, Oregon
- Barclay House (Bedford, Pennsylvania)
- Barclay House (West Chester, Pennsylvania)
- Barclay-Bryan House, Temple, Texas, listed on the National Register of Historic Places
- Barclays House, Poole, England
