= E. M. Backus Lodge =

Historic house in North Carolina, United States

- U.S. National Register of Historic Places
- U.S. Historic district
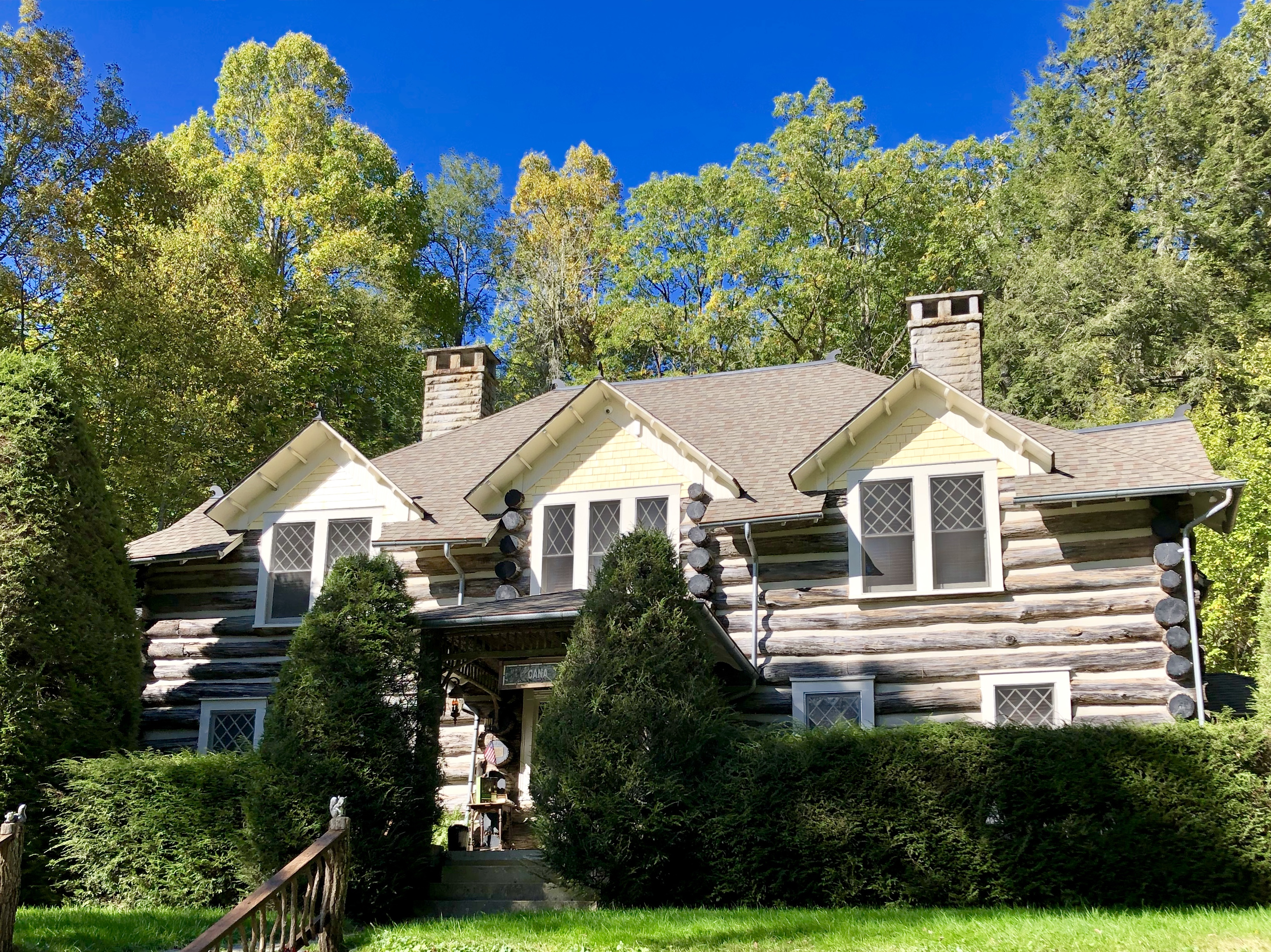
- Front of the Edward M. Backus Lodge

- Location within North Carolina Location within the United States
- Location: Cold Mountain Gap Rd., near Lake Toxaway, North Carolina
- Coordinates: 35°09′38″N 82°59′51″W
- Area: 20.6 acres (8.3 ha)
- Built: 1908
- Architectural style: Rustic log
- NRHP reference No.: 88000689
- Added to NRHP: June 9, 1988

E. M. Backus Lodge, also known as Camp Toxaway, The Cold Mountain Lodge and Canaan Land Christian Retreat , is a historic hunting lodge and national historic district located near Lake Toxaway, Jackson County and Transylvania County, North Carolina. The lodge was built about 1903, and is a 2-story, double-pile house of chestnut logs. The lodge contains eight rooms on two floors, each grouped around a central hall. Also on the property are the contributing log stable (1908, 1922), caretaker's cottage (1908, 1922), guest cottage (c. 1922), barn (c. 1922), and Davis Cottage (c. 1922). The site was the former hunting lodge of Thomas Edison, Henry Ford and Harvey Firestone. The camp became an exclusive girls' camp, Camp Toxaway, in 1922, and a religious and educational retreat in 1955 known as Canaan Land. The estate was bought by George and Nancy Corbett of Florida in 1986 and is still operated by the Corbett family.

It was listed on the National Register of Historic Places in 1988.
