= McMinn Building =

Historic building in North Carolina, US

- U.S. National Register of Historic Places
- U.S. Historic district – Contributing property
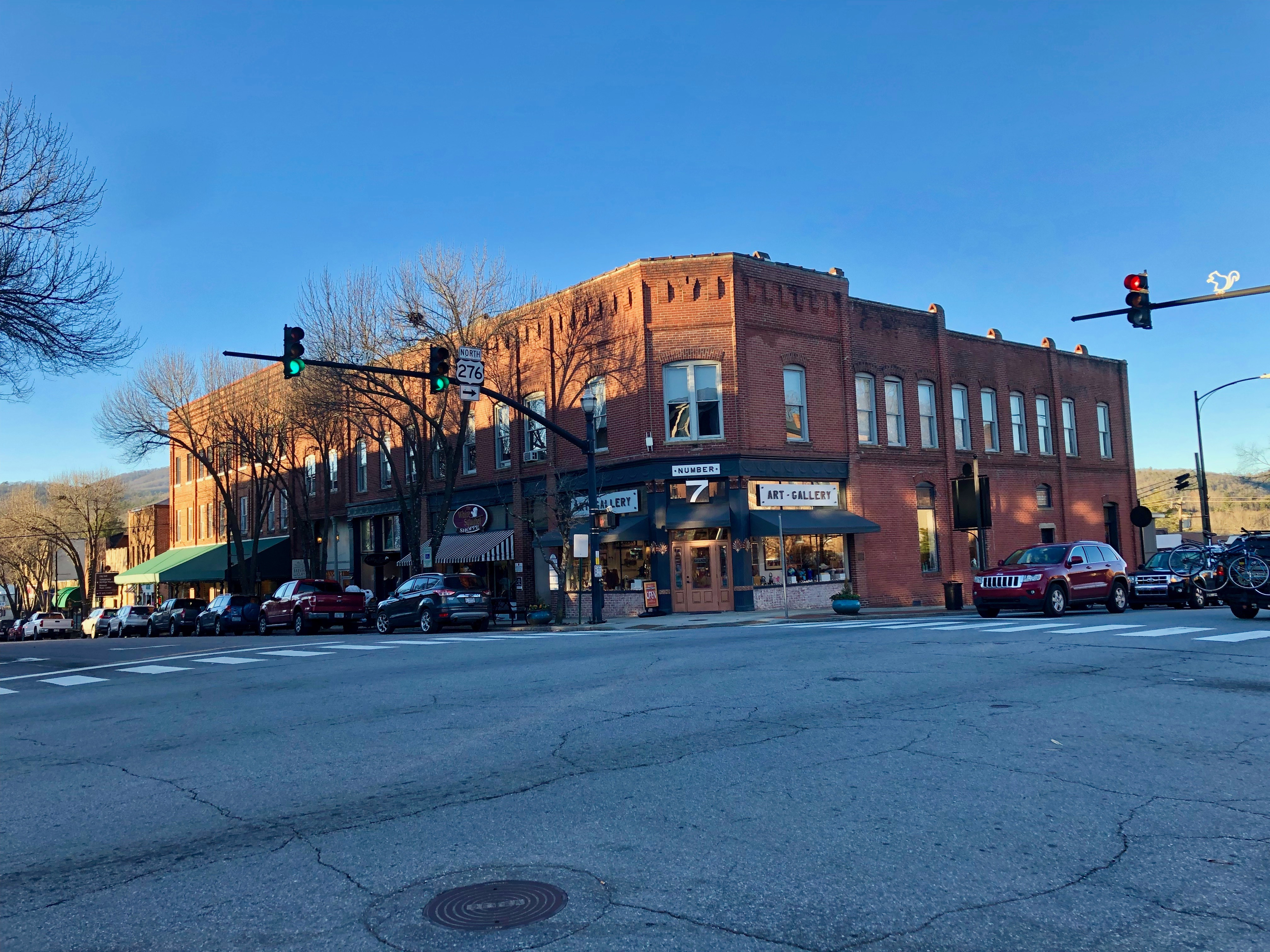
- McMinn Building, January 2019

- Location within North Carolina Location within the United States
- Location: 2-6 W. Main St., Brevard, North Carolina
- Coordinates: 35°14′2″N 82°44′4″W
- Area: less than one acre
- Built: 1899
- Architectural style: Italianate
- MPS: Transylvania County MPS
- NRHP reference No.: 94000034
- Added to NRHP: February 18, 1994

McMinn Building is a historic commercial building located at Brevard, Transylvania County, North Carolina. It was built in 1899, and is a two-story, rectangular brick building with robust decorative brickwork in the Italianate style. It has three storefronts on the first floor, and offices on the second arranged in a U-shaped plan.

It was listed on the National Register of Historic Places in 1994. It is located in the Main Street Historic District.
