= Transylvania Regional Hospital =

Hospital in North Carolina, United States

- Mission Health System

Geography
- Location: Brevard, North Carolina, United States
- Coordinates: 35.2561°N 82.7122°W

Organization
- Network: Mission Health System

History
- Former name: Transylvania Community Hospital
- Opened: 1933

Links
- Website: missionhealth.org/transylvania/
- Lists: Hospitals in North Carolina

Transylvania Regional Hospital (TRH), formerly known as Transylvania Community Hospital, is a Joint Commission on Accreditation of Healthcare Organizations accredited 94-bed community hospital. It was formed in 1933 and is located between downtown Brevard and the entrance to Pisgah National Forest in Transylvania County, North Carolina. It is operated by Mission Health System.
