= Main Street Historic District (Brevard, North Carolina) =

Historic district in North Carolina, United States

- U.S. National Register of Historic Places
- U.S. Historic district
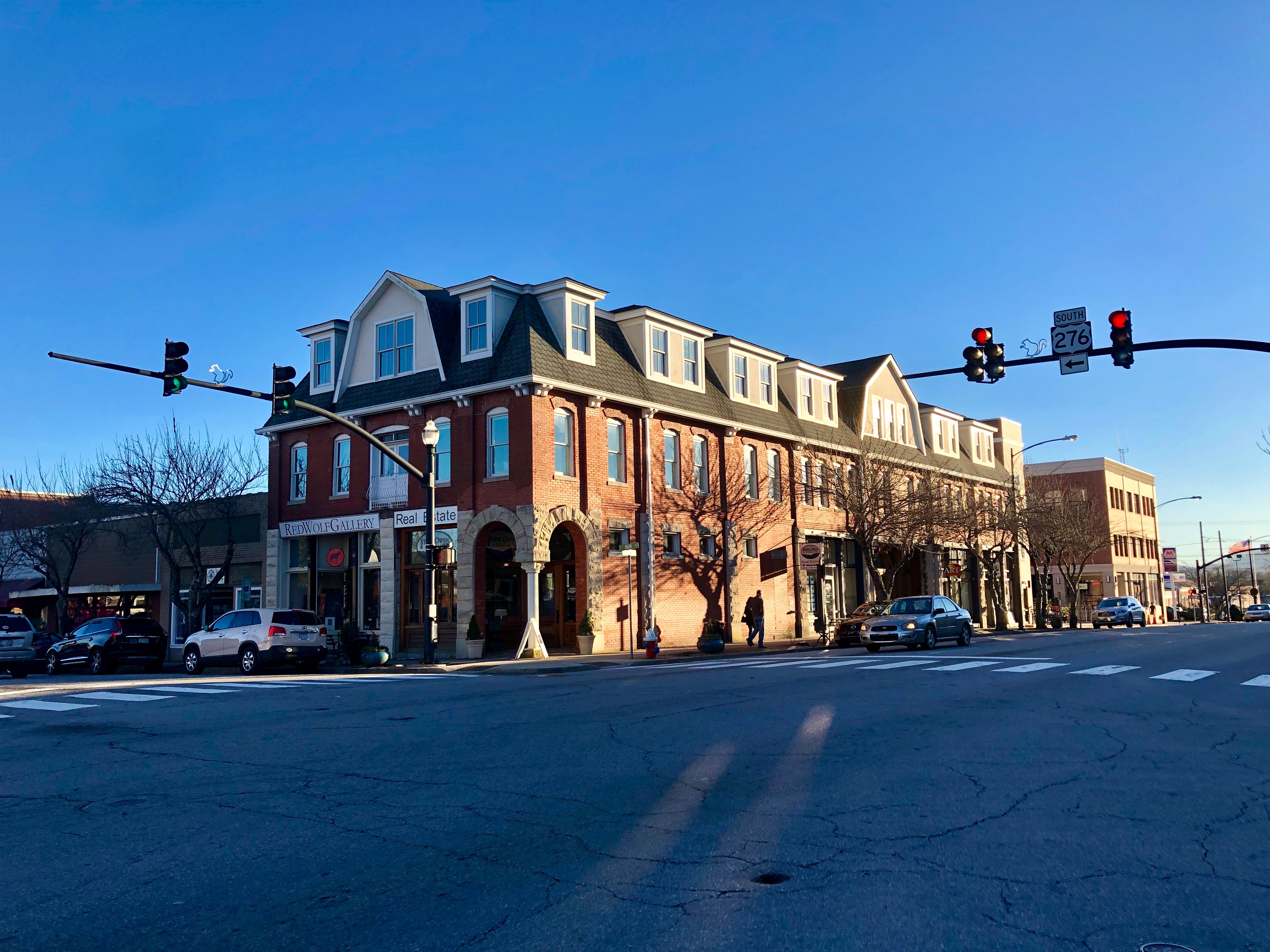
- Aethelwold Hotel Building, 2019

- Location within North Carolina Location within the United States
- Location: Roughly bounded by Gaston St., England St., Probart St., and Jordan St., Brevard, North Carolina
- Coordinates: 35°13′59″N 82°44′4″W
- Area: 13 acres (5.3 ha)
- Built: 1874
- Architect: Stillwell, Erle; Kilpatrick, Robert P.
- Architectural style: Early Commercial, Second Empire, Classical Revival, et al.
- MPS: Transylvania County MPS
- NRHP reference No.: 02000945
- Added to NRHP: September 6, 2002

Main Street Historic District is a national historic district located at Brevard, Transylvania County, North Carolina. It encompasses 32 contributing buildings in the central business district of Brevard. The district developed between about 1874 and 1952 and includes notable examples of Early Commercial, Second Empire, and Classical Revival style architecture. Located in the district are the separately listed McMinn Building and Transylvania County Courthouse. Other notable buildings include the Lowe Auto Company (c. 1928), Brevard Banking Company (1924), Brevard Drugs/Mull's Grocery (c. 1926), Brevard City Hall and Fire Station (1926), Plummer's Department Store (1911), Brevard Banking Company (1924) designed by Erle Stillwell, Co-ed Theater (1939), Pearlman's (1952), Aethelwold Hotel (1905, c. 1960), and City Market (c. 1905, 1940s).

It was listed on the National Register of Historic Places in 2002.

== Gallery ==
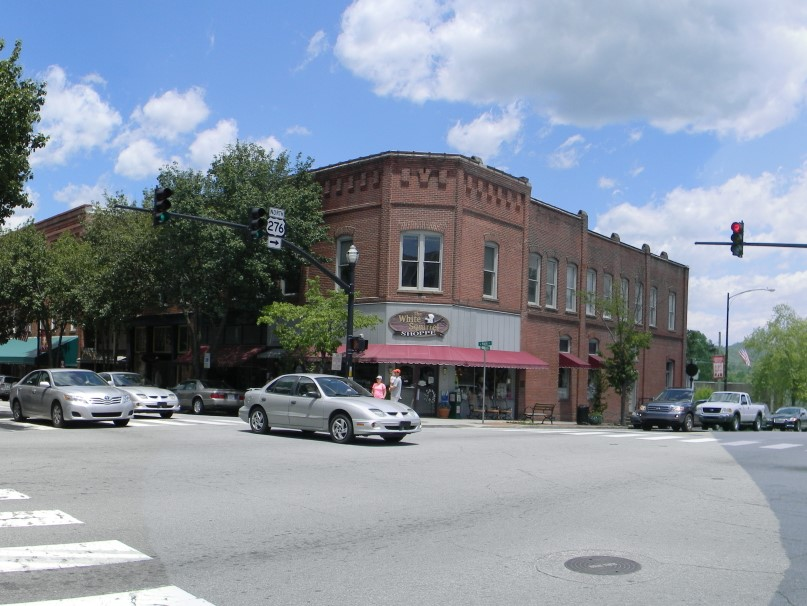
McMinn Building, 2012

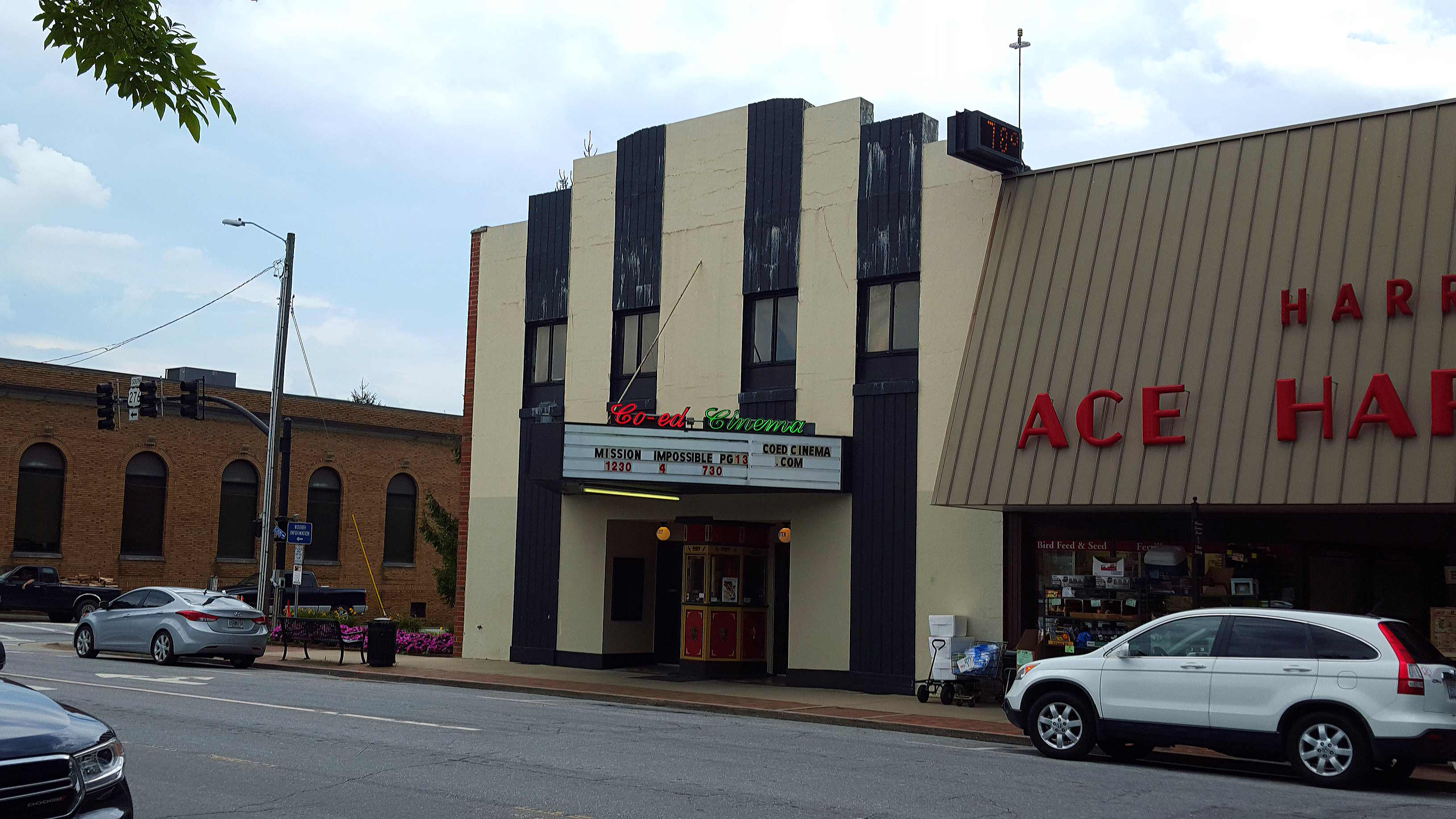
Co-Ed Theater, 2015

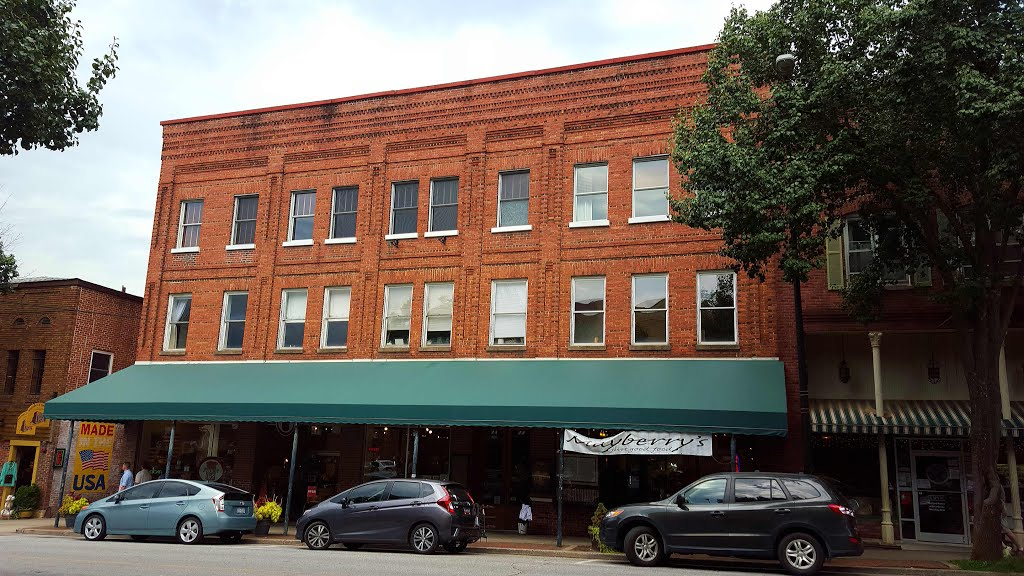
Plummer's Department Store, 2015

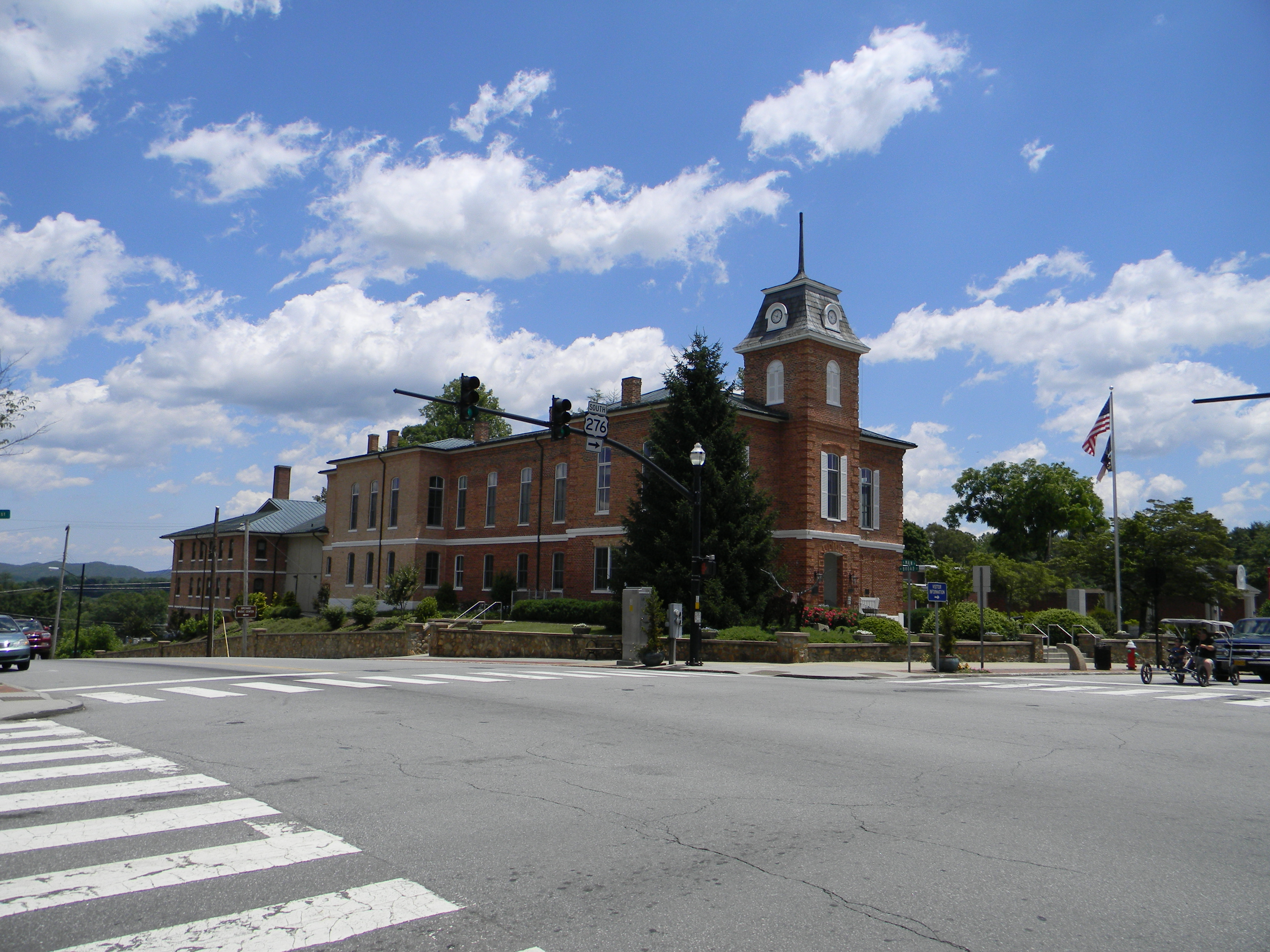
Transylvania County Courthouse, 2012
