= Flem Galloway House =

Historic house in North Carolina, United States

- U.S. National Register of Historic Places
- U.S. Historic district
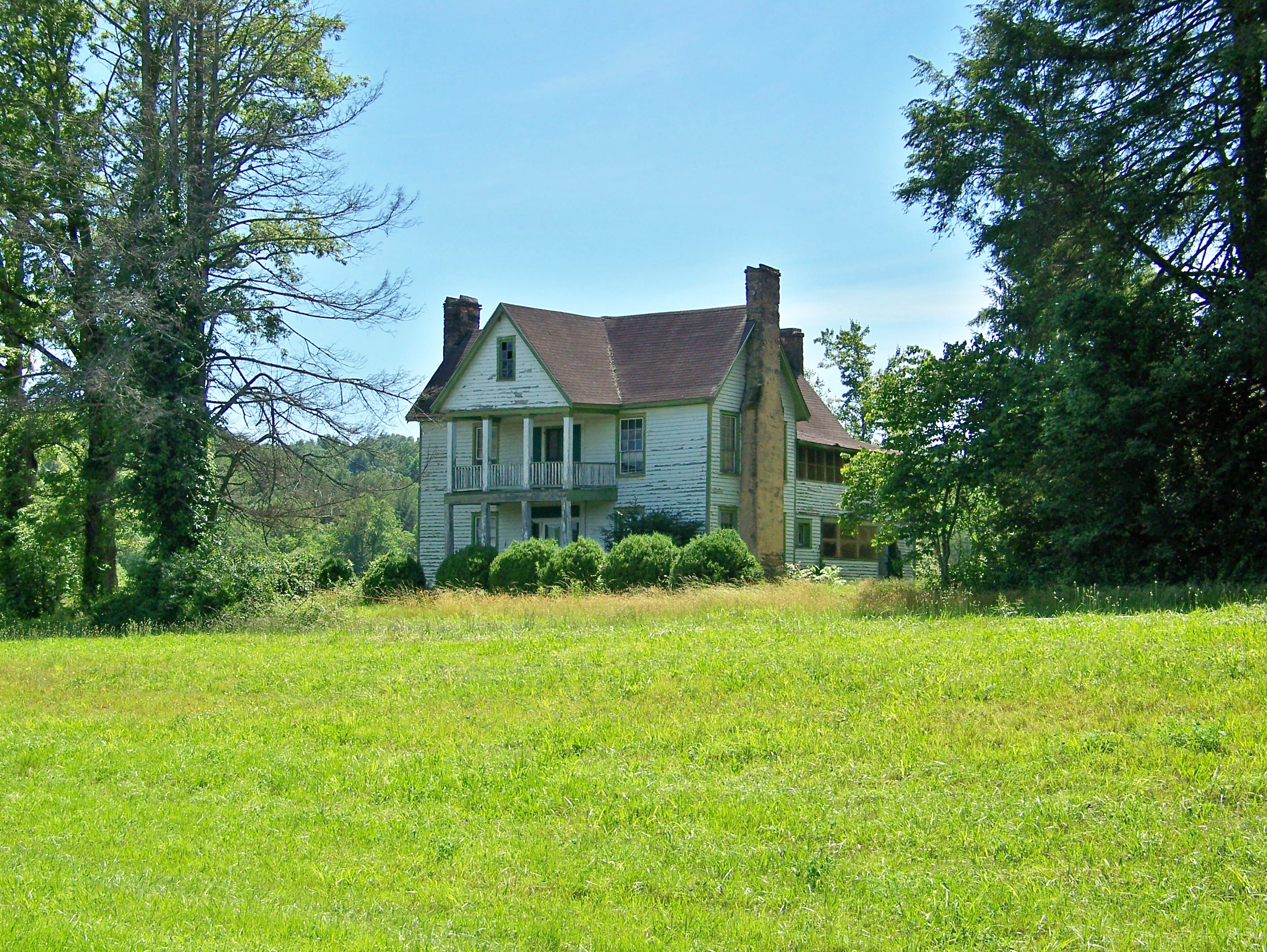
- Flem Galloway House, June 2013

- Location within North Carolina Location within the United States
- Location: NC 1388 W side, 2 miles S of jct. with NC 1129, near Calvert, North Carolina
- Coordinates: 35°9′17″N 82°48′41″W
- Area: 1.3 acres (0.53 ha)
- Built: 1878
- Built by: Orr, Joshua
- Architect: Galloway, John Flemming
- Architectural style: I-House
- MPS: Transylvania County MPS
- NRHP reference No.: 95000137
- Added to NRHP: February 24, 1995

Flem Galloway House is a historic home and national historic district located near Calvert, Transylvania County, North Carolina. It was built in 1878, and is a two-story, heavy timber frame I-house, with a two-story rear ell. It is sheathed in weatherboard and has a gable roof. The front facade features a two-tiered, center-bay, cross-gabled porch. Also on the property is a contributing 1 1/2-story smokehouse.

It was listed on the National Register of Historic Places in 1995.
