= Mission Health =

Hospital system in Asheville, North Carolina, U.S.

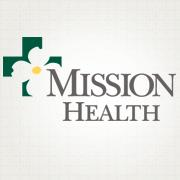
- Type: Subsidiary
- Founded: 1885; 141 years ago
- Headquarters: Asheville, North Carolina
- Parent: HCA Healthcare
- Website: missionhealth.org

Mission Health is an American healthcare company based in Asheville, North Carolina, United States. It serves much of western North Carolina. A sale to HCA Healthcare became final on February 1, 2019, in which it was sold as a nonprofit to a for-profit company. The proceeds went to a nonprofit foundation, the Dogwood Health Trust, which plans to distribute annual grants focused on healthcare.

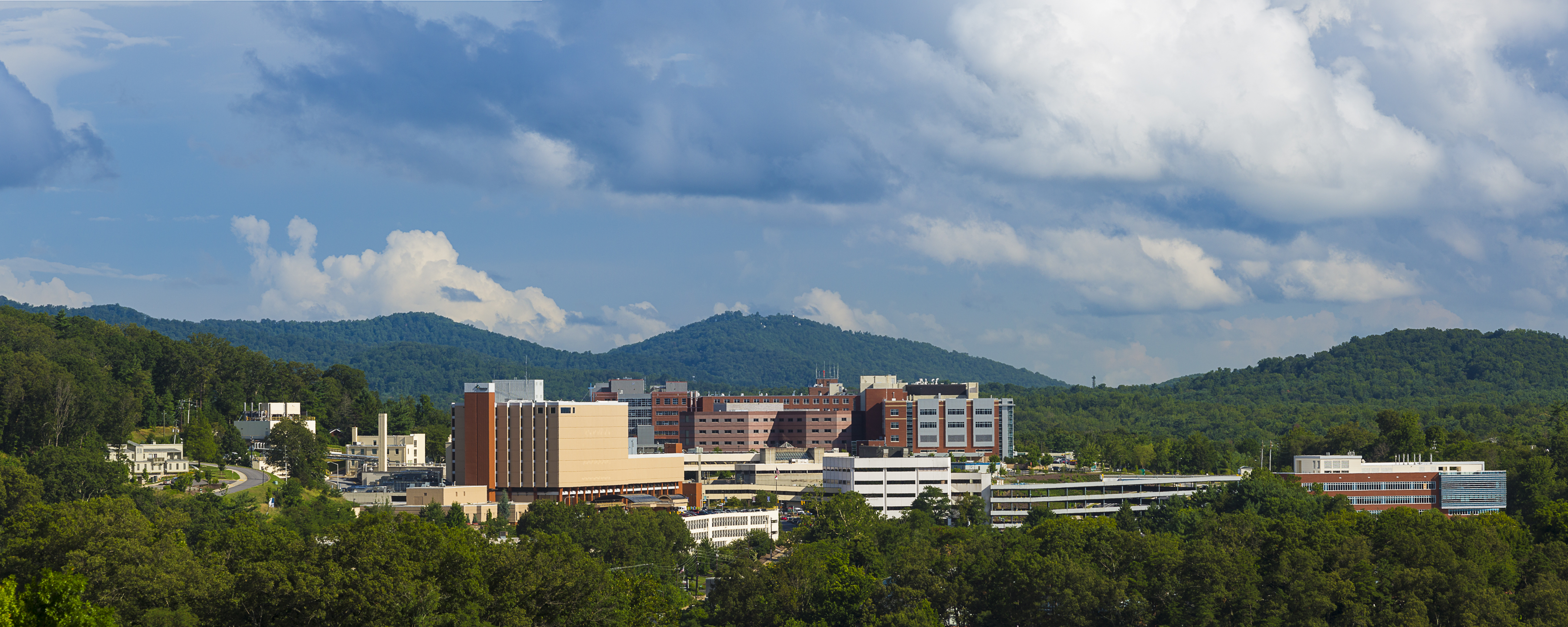
Mission Health in Asheville

Mission Health, which traces its roots in the region back to 1885, operates six hospitals, numerous outpatient and surgery centers, home health provider CarePartners, and the region's only dedicated Level I trauma center. Its medical staff consists of more than 1,000 physicians and is certified in more than 50 medical specialties and sub-specialties. Mission Health has seven Centers of Excellence: Cancer, Heart, Neurosciences, Orthopedics, Trauma, Women's Health, and Mission Children's Hospital, the region's only children's hospital.

Mission Hospital, located in Asheville, is the system's flagship hospital and is licensed for 815 beds. It is the regional referral center for tertiary and quaternary care. Other Mission Health member hospitals include Angel Medical Center in Franklin, Blue Ridge Regional Hospital in Spruce Pine, Highlands-Cashiers Hospital in Highlands, McDowell Hospital in Marion and Transylvania Regional Hospital in Brevard.

Mission Health has lobbied to prevent the construction of competing hospitals.

== History ==
Mission Hospital traces its roots to 1885, when a group of women calling themselves "The Little Flower Mission" saw a need for a hospital in Asheville that would care for those in need, regardless of their ability to pay. They raised funds by selling flowers on the streets of the city, started their hospital in a rented five-room house on what is now Biltmore Avenue near Hilliard Avenue, and expanded and relocated four times in the next seven years. By 1940, there were five small general hospitals in the city, but medical professionals had begun to see the need for a major medical center for western North Carolina. In 1947, Mission Hospital merged with Biltmore Hospital, a facility that was established in 1896 by the All Soul's Parish. A new hospital was constructed on land donated by George Vanderbilt, a facility that was renamed Memorial Mission Hospital.

Over time, Memorial Mission Hospital absorbed Victoria Hospital (formerly called Norburn Hospital, founded in 1928) and the Asheville Colored Hospital (founded in 1943).

Memorial Mission Medical Center and St. Joseph's Hospital established an organizational partnership in 1996 and formally merged in 1998 as Mission-St. Joseph's Health System.

=== St. Joseph's Hospital ===
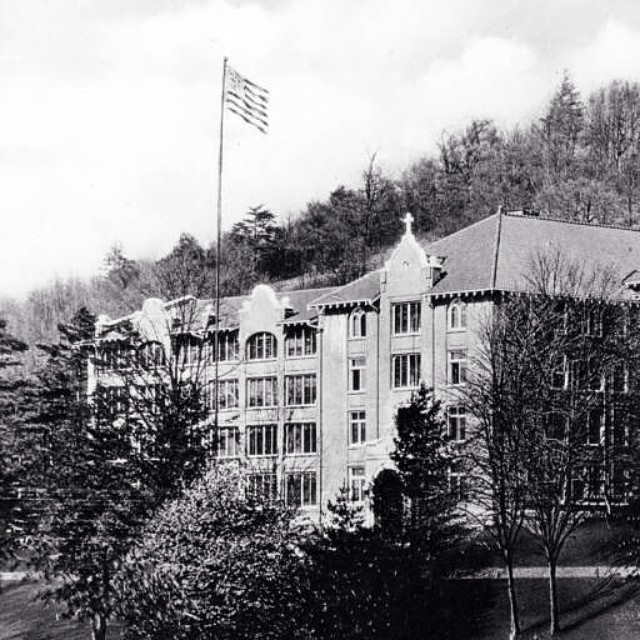
St. Joseph's Hospital, circa 1920

St. Joseph's Hospital was established by the Sisters of Mercy in 1900 as a sanatorium for the treatment of tuberculosis. It functioned out of a house on French Broad Avenue and was moved to Starnes Street before the sisters purchased what became its permanent location in 1909, at that time a large house belonging to William Wallace McDowell, a Confederate major who established a militia from Western North Carolina during the Civil War. The hospital expanded its services and facilities over the years and was declared a general hospital in 1939. After numerous expansions, a more modern facility was built in 1974.

=== Memorial Mission Hospital ===
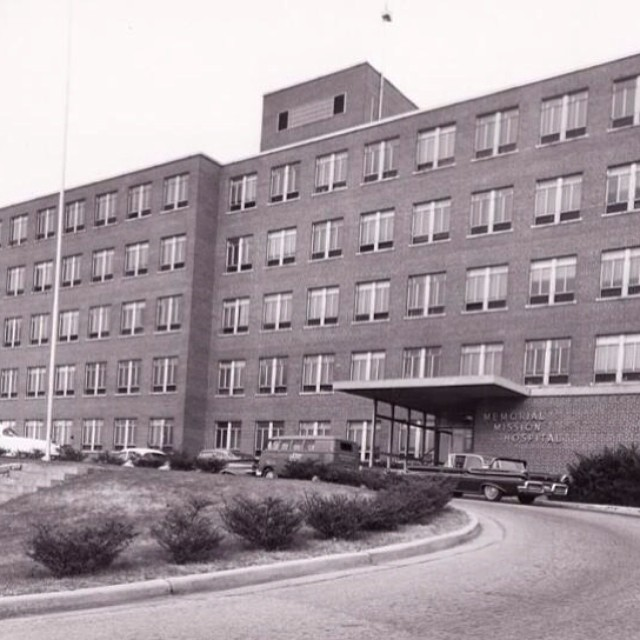
Memorial Mission Hospital, Circa 1950

After the consolidation of the smaller hospitals and the merger of Mission and Memorial Hospitals, Memorial Mission Hospital began operations with the hospitals on Reed Street and Woodfin Street in Asheville North Carolina. In 1951, the Biltmore Hospital facility was closed and construction began on a new hospital on Biltmore Avenue, across the street from St. Joseph's, and was dedicated in March 1954. As technology advanced and medical procedures were becoming very complicated and expensive, Memorial Mission began looking towards St. Joseph's in the hopes of combining operations. In 1995, Memorial Mission established its trauma program as a Level II center.

=== Becoming Mission Health ===
Following Memorial Mission's purchase of St. Joseph's from the Sisters of Mercy in 1998, Memorial Mission acquired McDowell Hospital in Marion and Blue Ridge Community Hospital in Spruce Pine. Mission Health was the state's sixth-largest health system and the western North Carolina’s only not-for-profit, independent community hospital system governed and managed exclusively in western North Carolina.

=== Purchase by HCA ===
The $1.5 billion sale of Mission Health to the for-profit HCA Healthcare, announced in March 2018, was completed on February 1, 2019.

Since the purchase was finalized, there has been a stark rise in the number of complaints from patients and staff alike regarding the hospital – including, but not limited to, long wait times in the emergency department, chronic understaffing, broken equipment, unsanitary conditions, patients lying in feces for extended periods of time, medication administration being delayed for hours at a time, nurses taking on twice their normal workload, and doctors leaving due to pay disputes.

The Centers for Medicare & Medicaid Services has given Mission its most severe sanction, "immediate jeopardy," at least four times since the hospital was acquired by HCA. As recently as 2026, state investigators found false documentation, "systemic staffing failures," an "unsafe environment," two deaths, patient privacy violations, "systemic and recurring" noncompliance with federal standards, and failure to isolate infectious diseases. If concerns go unaddressed, Mission could lose access to Medicaid and Medicare funding.

== Current operations ==
Mission Hospital is a general medical and surgical facility and teaching hospital that serves the people of Asheville, Buncombe County, and much of Western North Carolina from three locations: Mission Hospital, Mission Hospital-St. Joseph's campus and Mission Children's Hospital with more than 50 specialties.

Mission Hospital serves 18 counties of western North Carolina with six hospitals, one post-acute care rehab hospital, more than 100 physician practices, and five walk-in urgent care locations.

In 2020, Mission Hospital achieved Magnet recognition from the American Nurses Credentialing Center. That made it the only Magnet-recognized medical center in western North Carolina. The hospital was re-certified in 2025. As of 2025, Mission is the only hospital in North Carolina to be included on Healthgrades' list of America's Best Hospitals. The medical center has made the list every year since 2016. In 2025, Mission Hospital ranked among the top ten hospitals in the state according to U.S. News & World Report Best Hospitals Rankings. It was the only hospital in western North Carolina to place on the list. In 2026, Mission Hospital became recognized as a Level I trauma center, up from its Level II standing.
