= Lake Toxaway Methodist Church =

Historic church in North Carolina, United States

- U.S. National Register of Historic Places
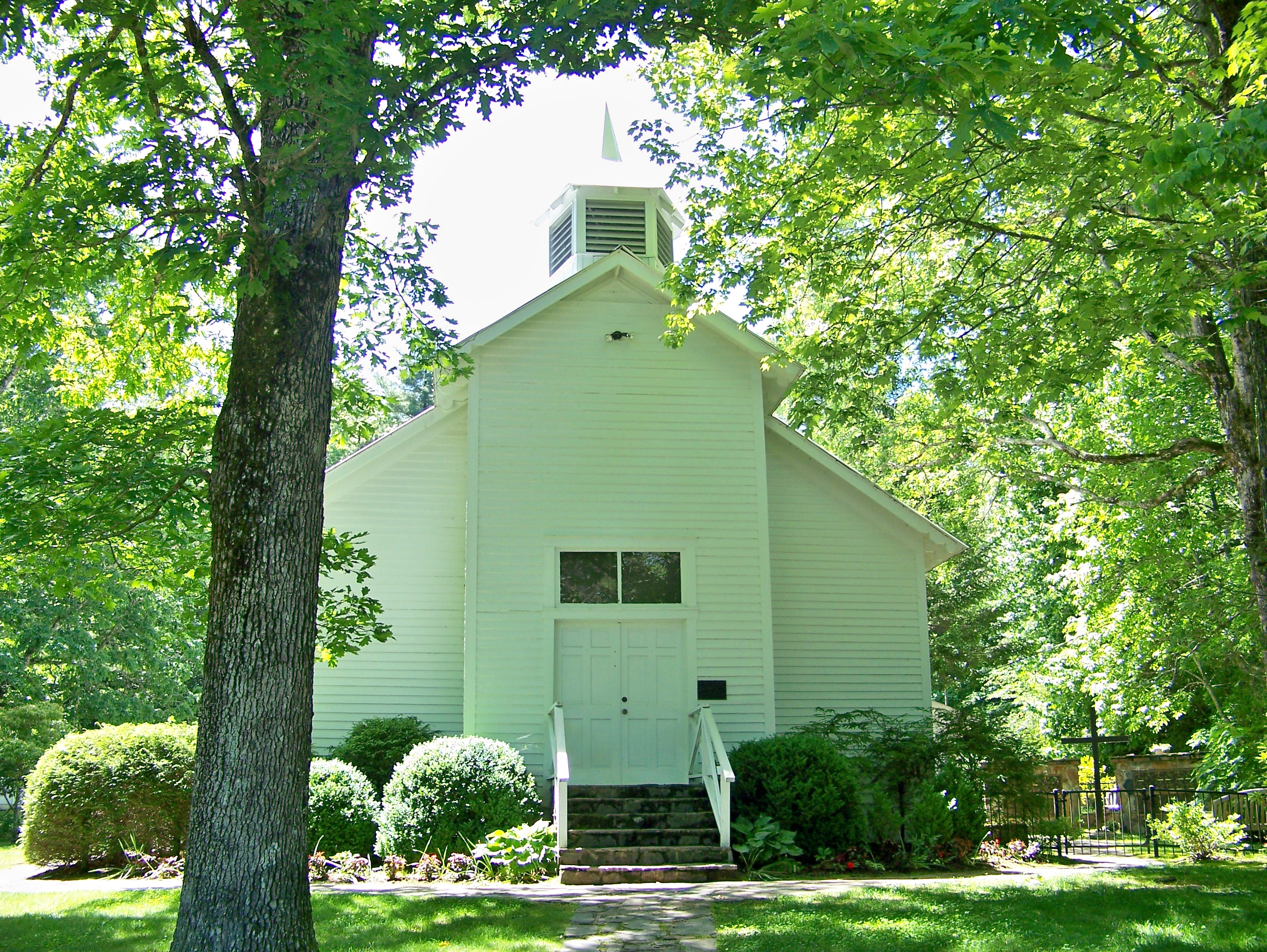

- Location within North Carolina Location within the United States
- Location: Cold Mountain Rd. N side, 0.1 mi. NW of jct. with NC 281, Lake Toxaway, North Carolina
- Coordinates: 35°8′22″N 82°55′59″W
- Area: 1 acre (0.40 ha)
- Built: 1912
- Architectural style: Late Gothic Revival
- NRHP reference No.: 94000033
- Added to NRHP: February 18, 1994

Lake Toxaway Methodist Church, also known as Methodist Episcopal Church South, is a historic Methodist church on Cold Mountain Road on the north side, 0.1 miles norwest of the junction with NC 281 in Lake Toxaway, Transylvania County, North Carolina. It was built in 1912, and is a small one-story, Late Gothic Revival style frame structure. It has a six-sided louvered bell tower and a tin roof.

It was added to the National Register of Historic Places in 1994.
