= Morgan's Mill =

- U.S. National Register of Historic Places
- Location within North Carolina Location within the United States
- Location: SW of Brevard on SR 1331, near Brevard, North Carolina
- Coordinates: 35°10′17″N 82°48′41″W
- Area: 1.5 acres (0.61 ha)
- Built: 1855
- NRHP reference No.: 79001753
- Added to NRHP: August 16, 1979

Morgan's Mill is a historic grist mill located near Brevard, Transylvania County, North Carolina. The original section was built about 1855. It consists of the original mid-19th century heavy frame portion, a late-19th century balloon frame addition, and the final mid-20th century shed/porch section.

It was listed on the National Register of Historic Places in 1979.
