= Blantyre, North Carolina =

- Unincorporated community
- Location within North Carolina Location within the United States
- Coordinates: 35°18′0.41″N 82°37′33″W
- Country: United States
- State: North Carolina
- County: Transylvania
- Elevation: 2,087 ft (636 m)
- Time zone: UTC-5 (Central (CST))
  - Summer (DST): UTC-4 (EDT)
- Area codes: 828
- GNIS feature ID: 1019217

Blantyre is an unincorporated community in Transylvania County, in the U.S. state of North Carolina. The community is located within the Asheville metropolitan area.

== History ==
In September 2004, the French Broad River, which flows through Blantyre, caused flooding to reach 25 ft (7.6 m) during Hurricane Frances.
