= Transylvania County Courthouse =

Historic courthouse in North Carolina, US

- U.S. National Register of Historic Places
- U.S. Historic district – Contributing property
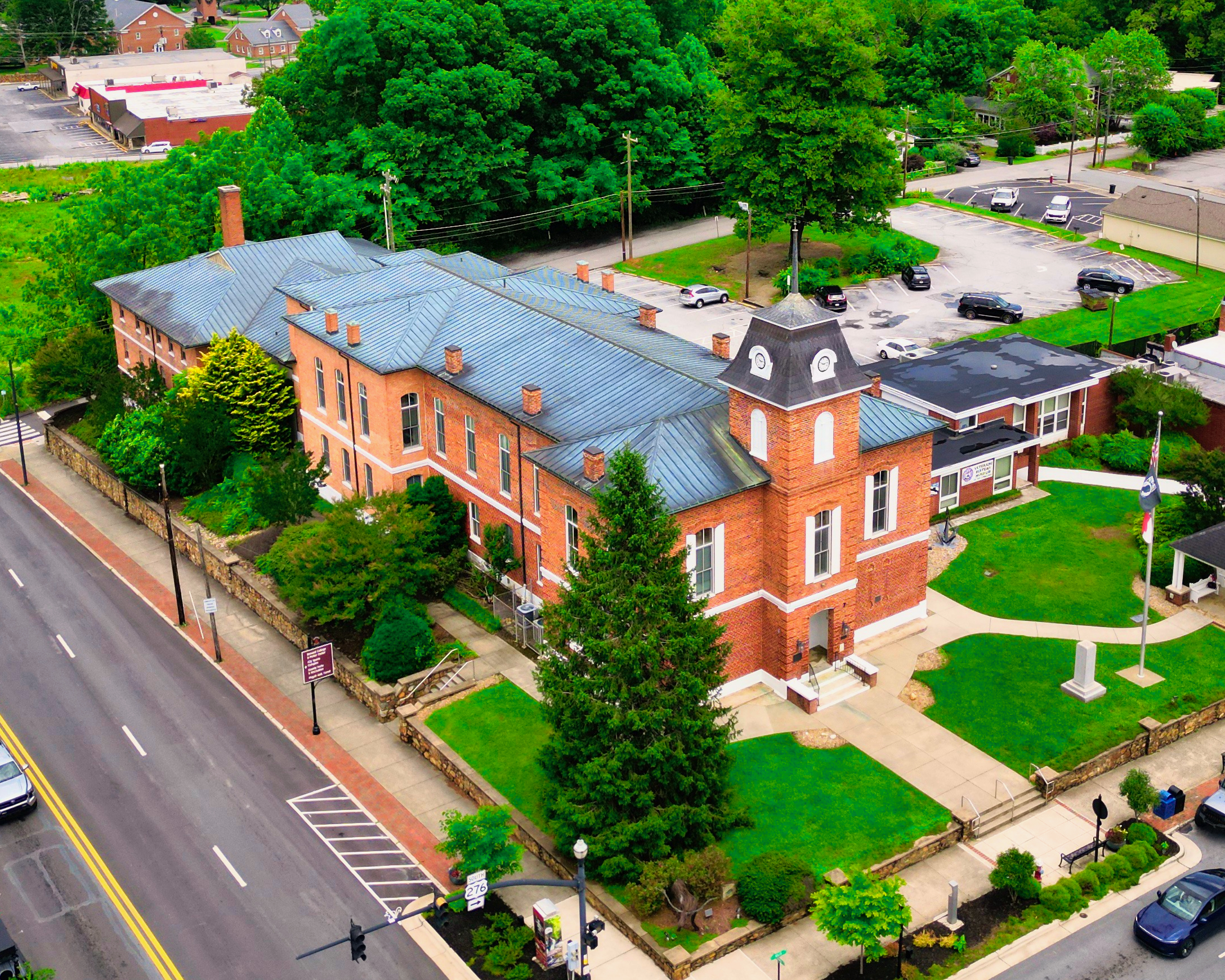
- Transylvania County Courthouse, 2026

- Location within North Carolina Location within the United States
- Location: N. Broad and E. Main St., Brevard, North Carolina
- Coordinates: 35°14′1″N 82°44′1″W
- Area: 1 acre (0.40 ha)
- Built: 1872
- Built by: Davis, Thomas
- Architectural style: Italianate
- MPS: North Carolina County Courthouses TR
- NRHP reference No.: 79001754
- Added to NRHP: May 10, 1979

Transylvania County Courthouse is a historic courthouse building located at Brevard, Transylvania County, North Carolina. It was built in 1873, and is a two-story, "T"-plan Italianate-style brick building with a hipped roof. It has a rear addition built in the early-20th century. The front facade features a projecting three-story tower topped by a concave mansard roof.

It was listed on the National Register of Historic Places in 1979. It is located in the Main Street Historic District.
