= Godfrey-Barnette House =

Historic house in North Carolina, United States

- U.S. National Register of Historic Places
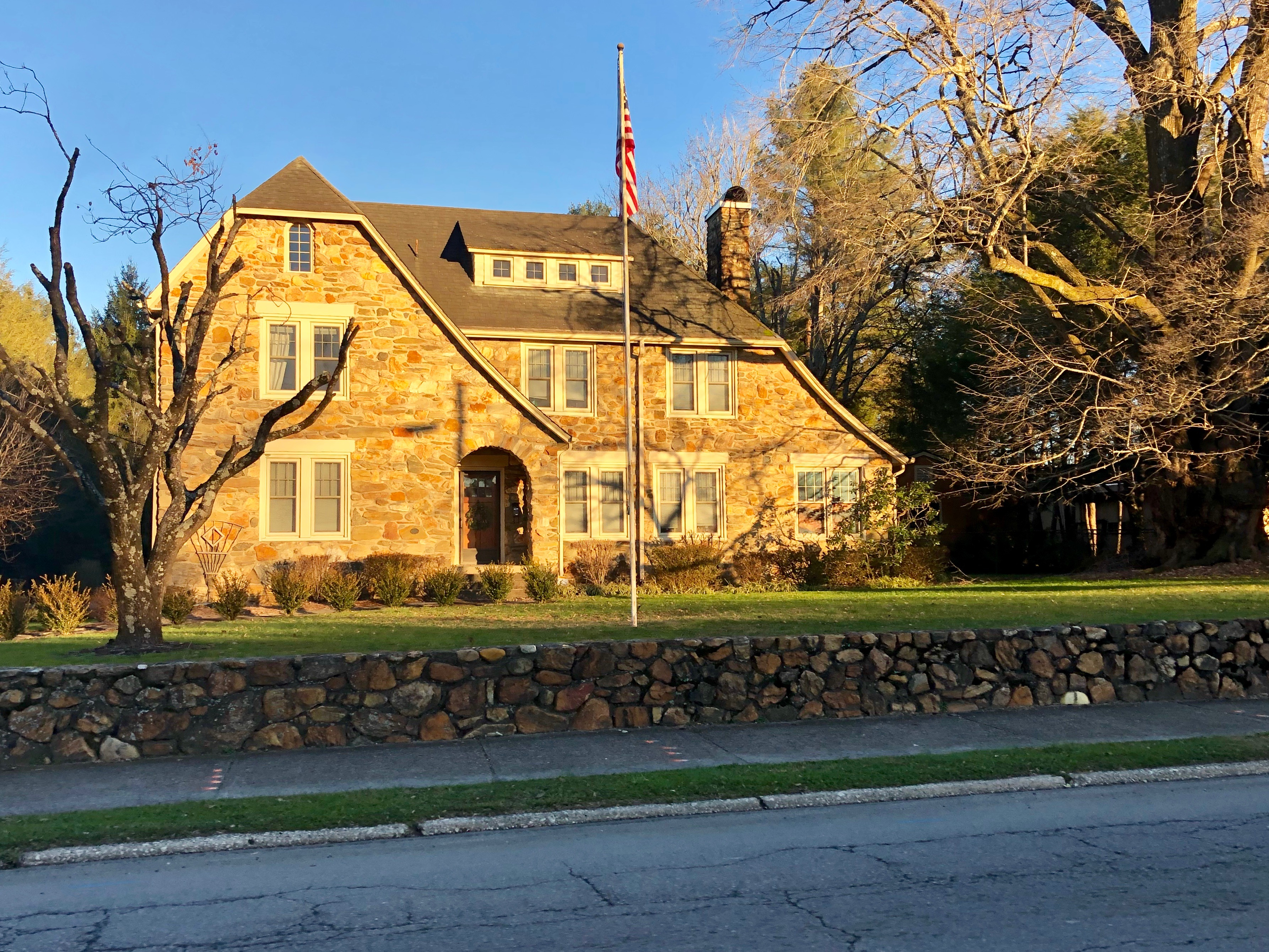
- Godfrey-Barnette House, January 2019

- Location within North Carolina Location within the United States
- Location: 503 S. Broad St., Brevard, North Carolina
- Coordinates: 35°13′37″N 82°44′15″W
- Area: 1 acre (0.40 ha)
- Built: c. 1918
- Architectural style: Late 19th And 20th Century Revivals, English Manorial
- MPS: Transylvania County MPS
- NRHP reference No.: 93001437
- Added to NRHP: December 30, 1993

Godfrey-Barnette House is a historic home located at Brevard, Transylvania County, North Carolina. It was built about 1918, and is a 2 1/2-story, five-bay, English Manorial Revival style stone dwelling with a modified T-plan. It has a clipped gable roof, porch, and sun room. Also on the property is a contributing stone fence.

It was listed on the National Register of Historic Places in 1993.
