= Hanckel-Barclay House =

Historic house in North Carolina, United States

- U.S. National Register of Historic Places
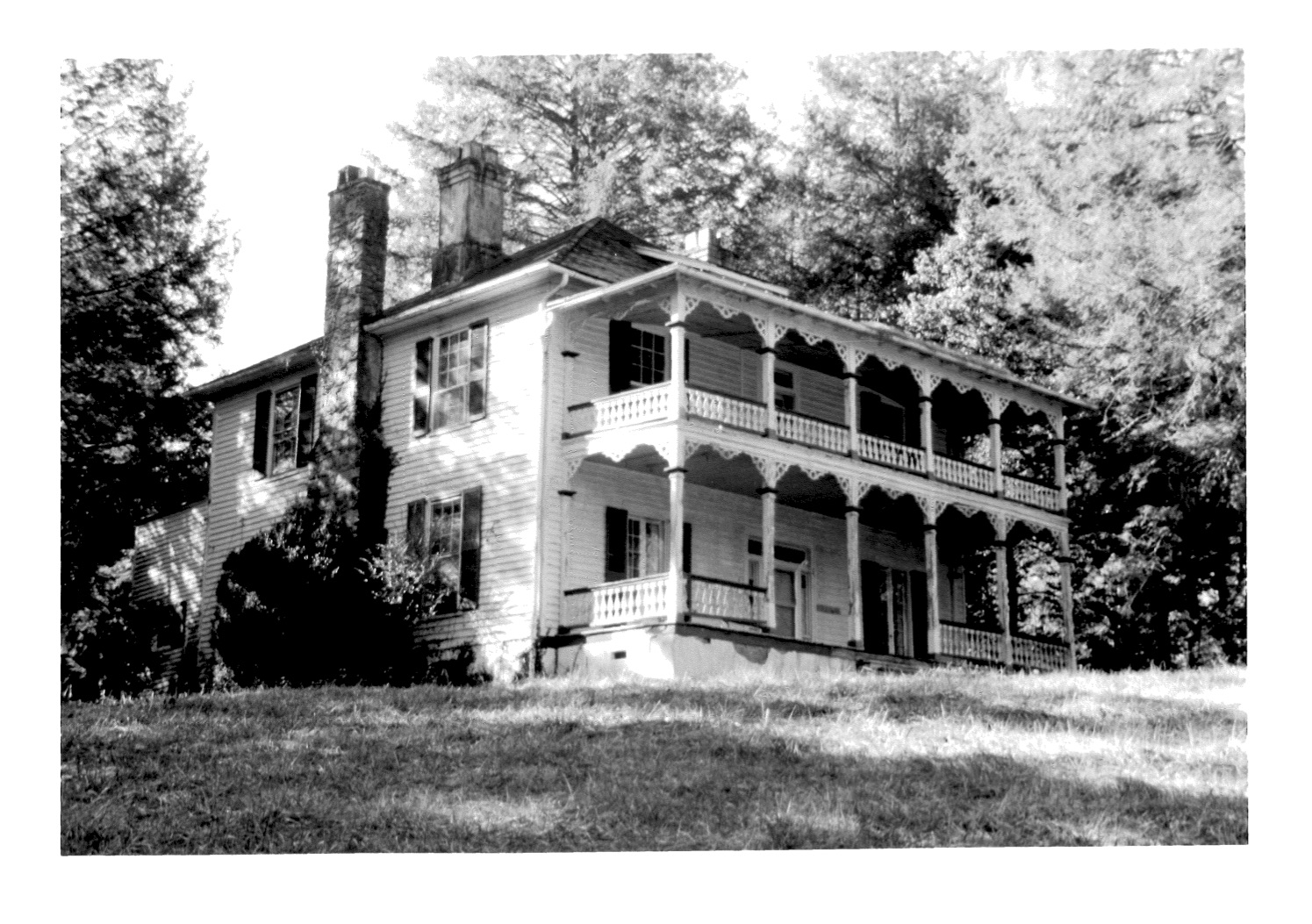

- Location within North Carolina Location within the United States
- Location: 0.8 miles W of Jct. NC 1114 and US 276, near Brevard, North Carolina
- Coordinates: 35°11′41″N 82°43′53″W
- Area: 22 acres (8.9 ha)
- Built: c. 1856
- Architectural style: Greek Revival
- MPS: Transylvania County MPS
- NRHP reference No.: 99001495, 00000825 (Boundary Increase)
- Added to NRHP: December 9, 1999, July 20, 2000 (Boundary Increase)

The Hanckel-Barclay House, also known as Chestnut Hill, is a historic house in the Dunn's Rock community near Brevard, Transylvania County, North Carolina, bordered by the French Broad River and US Highway 276. The house was listed on the National Register of Historic Places in 1999.

Built about 1856, the house is a two-story, double pile, Greek Revival style frame dwelling with a pyramidal roof. It is sheathed in weatherboard and features a two-tiered, hip-roof, full-facade porch. The property includes a root cellar (c. 1909), a garage (c. 1940), two storage sheds (c. 1910s-1920s, 1930s), a horse barn and a corn crib (c. 1910s-1920s).

The house was built as a summer residence for the Rev. James Stuart Hanckel (1817-1892), who was born into a wealthy Charleston family and who, in 1839, followed his father into the Episcopal priesthood. By 1860 Hanckel had eight children, and a spacious home was considered appropriate for a family of this size and social status. In Transylvania County, Hanckel helped establish a new—though short-lived—congregation, St. Paul's in the Valley (1856-1864); but in 1864, he moved to Charlottesville, Virginia, where he served as rector of Christ Episcopal Church until his death in 1892.

The Hanckel family sold the house in 1875 to Jesse and Hester Hollis, who held it until 1890, when a mortgage company foreclosed on the property. Thomas Claghorn Gower (1822-1894), former mayor of Greenville, South Carolina, bought the property in 1891 but then drowned in the French Broad River in 1894. His widow sold the property to Hampton E. Tener (1836-1910) in 1900.

After two quick transfers, the house and surrounding land was sold in 1909 to Joseph K. Barclay (1864-1938), a banker from Greensburg, Pennsylvania. Barclay's wife, Melusina "Mel" Corry Brunot Barclay (1870-1959) had "an avid interest in horticulture" and planted many "rare trees and flowering shrubs." The house remained in the Barclay family until 1996, and a number of support structures were built during the Barclay tenure. After being vacant for 10 years, the house was purchased and restored by Neil and Rosalie Morris.
