= Pisgah Forest, North Carolina =

Pisgah Forest
- Unincorporated community
- Location within the state of North Carolina
- Coordinates: 35°15′15″N 82°42′0″W
- Country: United States
- State: North Carolina
- County: Transylvania
- Elevation: 2,100 ft (640 m)
- Time zone: UTC−5 (Eastern (EST))
  - Summer (DST): UTC−4 (EDT)
- ZIP codes: 28768
- Area code: 828
- GNIS feature ID: 1021989

Not to be confused with Pisgah National Forest.

Pisgah Forest is an unincorporated community in Transylvania County, North Carolina, United States. It sits at an elevation of 2100 feet (640 m) along U.S. Route 64, northeast of Brevard. It is approximately a 30-minute drive from the Asheville Regional Airport. The community lies in an area noted for its many waterfalls and white squirrels. Pisgah Forest is a popular retirement area, at least partly because of the many hiking trails and trout streams of the nearby Pisgah National Forest and the DuPont State Forest.

== Climate ==
Climate data for Pisgah Forest, North Carolina (1981–2010 normals), (Note: Mean monthly maxima and minima (i.e. the expected highest and lowest temperature readings at any point during the year or given month) calculated based on data at said location from 1981 to 2010.)
Month	Jan	Feb	Mar	Apr	May	Jun	Jul	Aug	Sep	Oct	Nov	Dec	Year
Mean daily maximum °F (°C)	49.5 (9.7)	52.8 (11.6)	60.2 (15.7)	68.7 (20.4)	75.5 (24.2)	81.9 (27.7)	84.7 (29.3)	83.6 (28.7)	78.1 (25.6)	70 (21)	61.2 (16.2)	51.6 (10.9)	68.2 (20.1)
Mean daily minimum °F (°C)	24.4 (−4.2)	27.1 (−2.7)	32.5 (0.3)	39.7 (4.3)	48.3 (9.1)	56.6 (13.7)	60.5 (15.8)	60.1 (15.6)	53.3 (11.8)	41.7 (5.4)	32.7 (0.4)	26.3 (−3.2)	41.9 (5.5)
Average precipitation inches (mm)	5.45 (138)	5.29 (134)	5.48 (139)	4.36 (111)	4.73 (120)	5.46 (139)	5.53 (140)	5.71 (145)	5.16 (131)	4.15 (105)	5.18 (132)	5.23 (133)	61.73 (1,568)
Average snowfall inches (cm)	2.9 (7.4)	1.9 (4.8)	0.5 (1.3)	0.1 (0.25)	0 (0)	0 (0)	0 (0)	0 (0)	0 (0)	0 (0)	0.1 (0.25)	0.6 (1.5)	6.1 (15)
Source: xmACIS2 (Monthly Climate Normals)
