= Penrose, North Carolina =

- Unincorporated community
- Location within North Carolina Location within the United States
- Coordinates: 35°16′20″N 82°38′20″W
- Country: United States
- State: North Carolina
- County: Transylvania
- Elevation: 2,106 ft (642 m)
- Time zone: UTC-5 (Eastern (EST))
  - Summer (DST): UTC-4 (EDT)
- ZIP code: 28766
- Area code: 828
- GNIS feature ID: 1021865

Penrose is an unincorporated community in Transylvania County, North Carolina, United States. Penrose is located on U.S. Route 64 6 miles (9.7 km) east-northeast of Brevard. Penrose has a post office with ZIP code 28766.
