= Lake Toxaway =

Lake of the United States of America

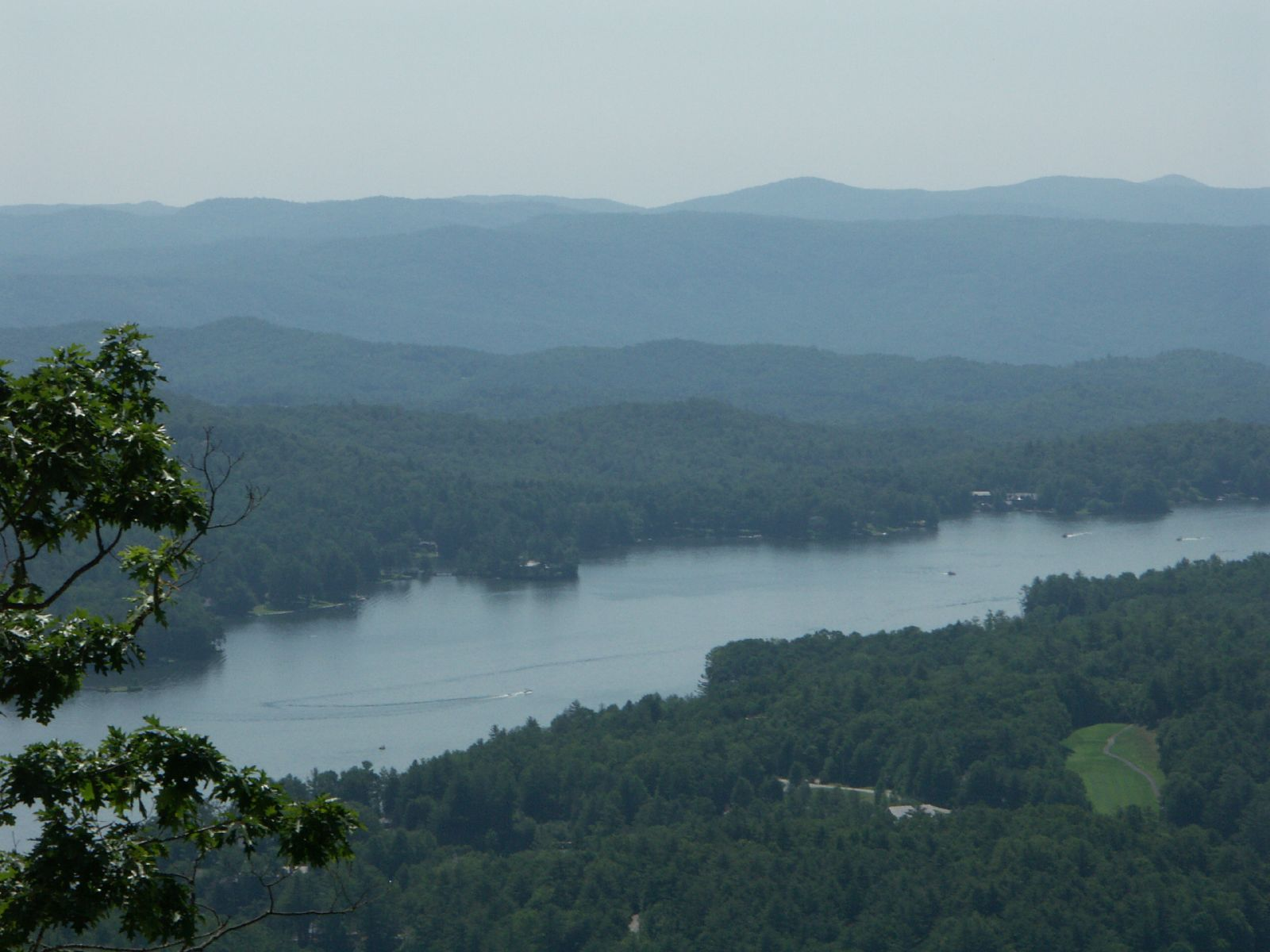

- Location within North Carolina Location within the United States
- Location: Transylvania County, North Carolina
- Coordinates: 35°08′04″N 82°56′27″W
- Type: artificial lake
- Basin countries: United States
- Surface area: 640 acres (260 ha)
- Max. depth: 60 ft (18 m)
- Shore length^{1}: 14 mi (23 km)
- Surface elevation: 2,956 ft (901 m)
- ^{1} Shore length is not a well-defined measure.

Lake Toxaway is the largest privately held lake in North Carolina. The lake, developed by the Lake Toxaway Company, is man-made and covers 640 acres (2.6 km^{2}) 60 feet (18 m), and the shoreline is 14 miles (23 km). Water sources for the lake include multiple free-flowing mountain streams with the Toxaway River being the main source. The lake flows out onto Toxaway Falls and then continues down the Toxaway River. The main road through the Lake Toxaway area is U.S. Highway 64, a typical winding mountain road with tight turns. Lake Toxaway history encompasses two distinct time periods. The first era which began in 1890 ended with the collapse of the earthen dam in 1916. In 1960 the second era began when the Lake Toxaway Company purchased the land and rebuilt the lake.

== History ==
In 1890, E.H. Jennings came to Transylvania County, North Carolina from Pennsylvania and established several businesses, one of which was the Toxaway Company. Lake Toxaway was filled originally in 1902 by E. H. Jennings, who visited what is now Lake Toxaway in the 1890s and saw that the area held great potential. The area became known as the "Switzerland of America" and encompassed several fabulous resorts created by Jennings such as the Fairfield Inn, The Sapphire Inn, the Lodge, the Franklin Hotel and the Toxaway Inn. The resorts could not have been developed if Southern Railway had not built a rail system from Asheville, which, incidentally, was the steepest railroad system in the United States. The arrival of the railroad coincided with the creation of the Lake and the opening of the Toxaway Inn in 1903. The Lake and the Inn were magnificent achievements for their time. Lake Toxaway was the first artificial lake built in the Appalachian Mountains, the earthen dam was 500 feet (150 m) long, 60 feet (18 m) high and 20 feet (6.1 m) wide at the top.

The Toxaway Inn accommodated 500 guests paying $17.50 and more per week. It rose five stories above the lake, more than 40 species of wood were cut from the property and used for the woodwork. Within the inn were many modern conveniences: central heat, electrical engineering, private indoor plumbing, long-distance telephones, and elevators. French chefs prepared the finest cuisine. Guests were served in a dining room adorned with imported crystal and dinnerware, sterling silver and fine linens. Amenities included a ballroom with a large orchestra for dancing, a billiard parlor, bowling alley, bar, gazebo for outdoor concerts, boating, swimming, fishing, golf, tennis, horseback riding and hunting. The lavish style of the Inn attracted the rich and famous from its opening in 1903. Frequent guests included Henry Ford, Harvey Firestone, the Vanderbilt family, John D. Rockefeller, James Buchanan Duke, R. J. Reynolds and Thomas Edison.

On August 13, 1916 after severe flooding, which deluged the Toxaway River with 24 inches (610 mm) of rain in 24 hours, the dam, which had not been engineered with a water level control, gave way under the stress and sent more than 5 billion US gallons (19,000,000 m^{3}) of water crashing over the falls into South Carolina. The only casualty of this disaster was the death of a mule. Toxaway Falls still shows the trauma of the dam burst, its granite rock exposed for a great distance down the falls.

The Toxaway Inn itself survived the flood, but the loss of the Lake was its demise. The Inn stood empty for over 33 years and was demolished in 1947.

== Climate ==
Lake Toxaway has a subtropical highland climate (Cfb) with warm summers and moderately cold winters. Lake Toxaway has the highest average annual amount of precipitation in North Carolina, averaging 96 inches (2,400 mm) of rainfall per year and it is part of the Appalachian temperate rainforest.

Climate data for LAKE TOXAWAY 2 SW, NC (1991–2020 normals)
| Month | Jan | Feb | Mar | Apr | May | Jun | Jul | Aug | Sep | Oct | Nov | Dec | Year |
|---|---|---|---|---|---|---|---|---|---|---|---|---|---|
| Mean daily maximum °F (°C) | 46.1 (7.8) | 49.7 (9.8) | 56.9 (13.8) | 66.6 (19.2) | 72.7 (22.6) | 76.4 (24.7) | 78.7 (25.9) | 77.0 (25.0) | 72.7 (22.6) | 64.5 (18.1) | 56.5 (13.6) | 48.6 (9.2) | 63.9 (17.7) |
| Daily mean °F (°C) | 36.8 (2.7) | 39.6 (4.2) | 45.9 (7.7) | 54.3 (12.4) | 62.0 (16.7) | 67.9 (19.9) | 70.7 (21.5) | 69.5 (20.8) | 64.5 (18.1) | 54.8 (12.7) | 46.1 (7.8) | 39.6 (4.2) | 54.3 (12.4) |
| Mean daily minimum °F (°C) | 27.5 (−2.5) | 29.5 (−1.4) | 34.8 (1.6) | 42.1 (5.6) | 51.3 (10.7) | 59.5 (15.3) | 62.7 (17.1) | 61.9 (16.6) | 56.3 (13.5) | 45.2 (7.3) | 35.7 (2.1) | 30.6 (−0.8) | 44.7 (7.1) |
| Average precipitation inches (mm) | 8.70 (221) | 7.06 (179) | 7.84 (199) | 7.35 (187) | 6.96 (177) | 7.77 (197) | 9.35 (237) | 8.94 (227) | 9.42 (239) | 6.65 (169) | 7.73 (196) | 8.57 (218) | 96.34 (2,447) |
| Average snowfall inches (cm) | 3.3 (8.4) | 2.8 (7.1) | 2.0 (5.1) | 0.0 (0.0) | 0.0 (0.0) | 0.0 (0.0) | 0.0 (0.0) | 0.0 (0.0) | 0.0 (0.0) | 0.0 (0.0) | 0.2 (0.51) | 3.3 (8.4) | 11.6 (29) |
| Average precipitation days (≥ 0.01 in) | 10.5 | 9.4 | 11.5 | 11.4 | 11.6 | 14.6 | 16.3 | 14.4 | 10.1 | 9.0 | 9.0 | 10.6 | 138.4 |
| Average snowy days (≥ 0.1 in) | 1.5 | 1.4 | 0.8 | 0.0 | 0.0 | 0.0 | 0.0 | 0.0 | 0.0 | 0.0 | 0.2 | 0.9 | 4.8 |
Source: NOAA

== Modern era ==
A group of investors headed by R.D. Heinitsh, Sr., bought the 9,000-acre (36 km^{2}) tract that once surrounded the original start of the 20th-century resort. This group of investors started the Lake Toxaway Company and began the project of restoring the 640-area lake. Heinitsh cleared the entire area where the lake had once existed. He then rebuilt the dam and restored the lake to its original level of 3,010 feet (920 m) above sea level. This started the modern era of development. In 1963 Heinitsh built a golf course and the Lake Toxaway Country Club was formed. The Lake Toxaway Country Club includes a Kris Spence 18 hole, par 71 golf course and it was completed in 2008. The course plays up to 6,418 yards, has Bentgrass greens and fairways with Bluegrass roughs. A Tom Fazio Learning Center is also located on the property and is part of the Lake Toxaway Country Club. The Tom Fazio Learning Center which opened in 2003 is a 20-acre (81,000 m^{2}) facility. The Lake Toxaway Country Club also includes five Har-Tru fast dry tennis courts and several championship bentgrass croquet courts.

Today, Lake Toxaway is still the largest private lake in North Carolina and is surrounded by Hawk Mountain, Panthertail Mountain, Cold Mountain, and Mt. Toxaway along with several wilderness areas totaling over 10,000 adjoining acres (40 km^{2}). Popular recreational activities include fishing, swimming, boating, skiing and sailing.

A $7.1 million clubhouse renovation was completed in 2018, resulting in the 2018 Golden Fork Club award from Golf Inc. Magazine. A Phase II Lake Club improvement was completed in 2020 and included a pool, outside Grille with dining pavilion, and activities building.

== The Greystone Inn ==
Around 1910, the Armstrong family from Savannah stayed at the Toxaway Inn and decided to build a summer home in Lake Toxaway. In 1913, Lucy Camp Armstrong, assisted by eleven servants, pitched a tent with a hardwood floor on the knoll of a short, oak dotted peninsula jutting into Lake Toxaway. Her husband George F. Armstrong had proposed that she camp out on the location she had selected for a summer home to be sure she liked it.

Mrs. Armstrong's six-level residence completed in 1915 replicated the architectural details of a Swiss mountain cottage; casement windows, flower boxes, balconies embellished with small triangular cutouts. Stepped brackets supported the balconies and gable roof and the foundation and surrounding walkways were of native stone.

Although the Toxaway Inn never reopened following the dam burst of 1916, the Armstrongs did not desert their retreat. George Armstrong died in an automobile accident in the 1920s but Lucy Armstrong continued to summer in the mountains. Between 1915 and 1932, a generous kitchen, freestanding library, stables, and a swimming pool were added, converting the home into a year-round residence.

In the early 1930s, local businessman Carl Molz, a frequent visitor to the Armstrong home, called on Mrs. Armstrong and asked her to marry him. The couple were married seven months later. The couple lived at their mountain home until 1963, when Carl Moltz died. Mrs. Moltz, having lived in her Swiss-style home for 47 years, then sold the residence to R.D Heinitsh Sr., and moved to a smaller home she owned on Lake Toxaway where she lived until she died in 1971, at the age of ninety.

In 1984, Tim and Boo Boo Lovelace purchased the property and formed a business partnership with the Lake Toxaway Company to form the Greystone Inn. Following an extensive renovation, the mansion and the Lakeside Cottage were listed on the National Register of Historic Places, and the inn opened its doors on July 15, 1985. The Lovelaces eventually sold their portion of the business to the Lake Toxaway Company.

The Greystone Inn was the first country inn to receive AAA's Four-Diamond Award - the first year it opened and every year since.

The Greystone Inn was closed in 2015 and was purchased two years later by Geoff and Shannon Ellis in 2017. The new owners renovated the Greystone Inn during the winter and spring of 2018 to bring the inn back to its former glory, and reopened the doors to the public in May 2018. The Greystone Inn is open year-round with 30 guest rooms, a lakeside restaurant, and a full-service spa.

== Notable residents of Lake Toxaway ==
- Bernard Marcus, co-founder of The Home Depot
- Bolch family, owners of RaceTrac
- Douglas Ivester, former chairman and CEO of The Coca-Cola Company
- Tom Fazio, golf course architect
- Glen P. Robinson, founder of Scientific Atlanta
- Cliff Williams, member of AC/DC
- Ivan Allen Jr., businessman and politician
- Edward H. Inman, son of Hugh T. Inman and owner of Swan House (Atlanta)
- Victoria Jackson (entrepreneur) and Bill Guthy, owners of Guthy-Renker, Proactiv, and Victoria Jackson Cosmetics
- Lykes Family, one of the nation's largest landowners
- Gordon D. Giffin, former U.S. Ambassador to Canada, member of the Council on Foreign Relations and the Trilateral Commission, partner and Global Vice-Chair emeritus at Dentons US LLP
- Dana Deasy, former Chief Information Officer of Department of Defense (DoD CIO), JPMorgan Chase, General Motors North America, Tyco International, Siemens Americas, and member of CIO Hall of Fame
- Richard D. Clarke, four-star general and 12th commander of United States Special Operations Command
- Dennis P. Lockhart, economist and President of Federal Reserve Bank of Atlanta
