= Lake Toxaway, North Carolina =

Lake Toxaway
- Unincorporated community
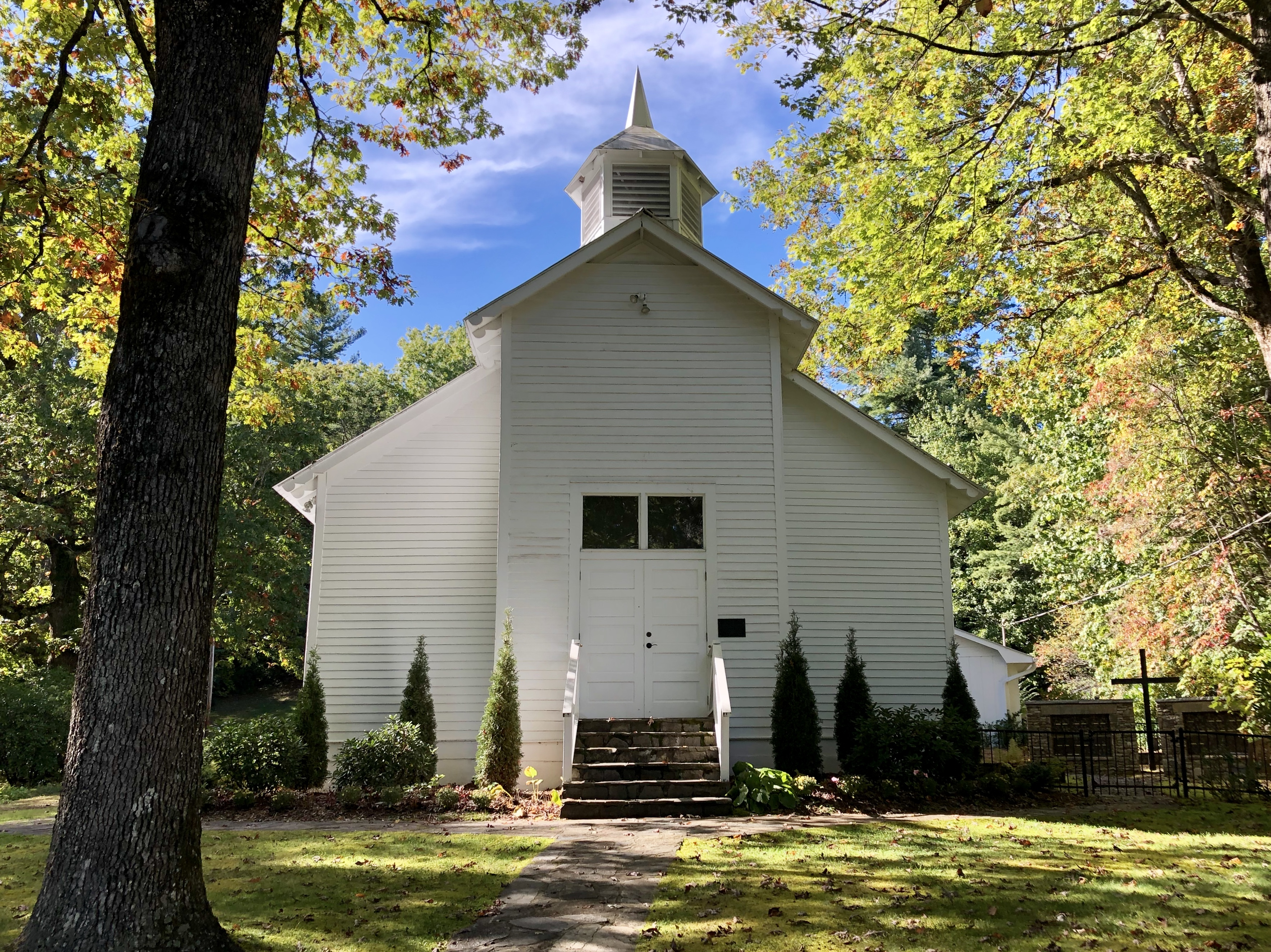
- Lake Toxaway Methodist Church

- Location within the state of North Carolina
- Coordinates: 35°07′56″N 82°56′02″W
- Country: United States
- State: North Carolina
- County: Transylvania
- Elevation: 2,979 ft (908 m)
- Time zone: UTC-5 (Eastern (EST))
  - Summer (DST): UTC-4 (EDT)
- ZIP code: 28747
- GNIS feature ID: 1021081

Lake Toxaway is an unincorporated community in western Transylvania County, North Carolina on U.S. Route 64, and North Carolina Highway 281.

== National Register of Historic Places ==
The E. M. Backus Lodge, known as Canaan Land, was listed on the National Register of Historic Places in 1988.
