= Transylvania County, North Carolina =

County in North Carolina, United States

- County
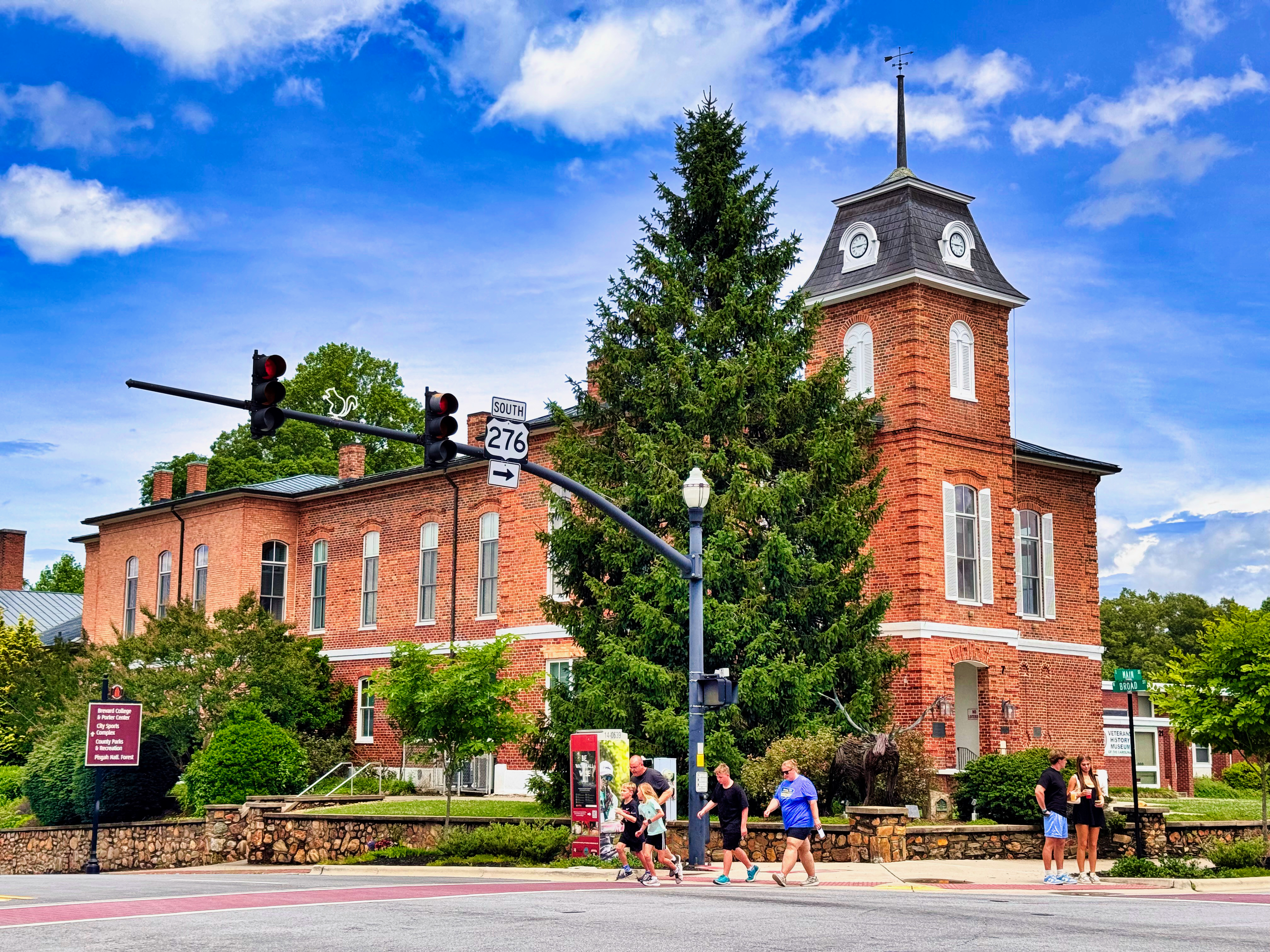
- Transylvania County Courthouse in Brevard

- Seal Logo
- Nickname: Land of Waterfalls
- Location within the U.S. state of North Carolina
- Coordinates: 35.21°N 82.82°W
- Country: United States
- State: North Carolina
- Founded: 1861
- Named for: Latin word meaning "Across the Woods"
- Seat: Brevard
- Largest community: Brevard

Area
  - Total: 380.33 sq mi (985.1 km^{2})
  - Land: 378.36 sq mi (979.9 km^{2})
  - Water: 1.97 sq mi (5.1 km^{2}) 0.52%

Population (2020)
  - Total: 32,986
  - Estimate (2025): 34,211 ▲
  - Density: 87.18/sq mi (33.66/km^{2})
- Time zone: UTC−5 (Eastern)
  - Summer (DST): UTC−4 (EDT)
- Congressional district: 11th
- Website: www.transylvaniacounty.org

Transylvania County is a county in the U.S. state of North Carolina. As of the 2020 census the population is 32,986. Its county seat is Brevard.

Transylvania County comprises the Brevard, NC Micropolitan Statistical Area, which is also included in the Asheville-Waynesville-Brevard, NC Combined Statistical Area.

== History ==
The North Carolina General Assembly apportioned Transylvania County on February 15, 1861, from lands previously attributed to neighboring Jackson and Henderson counties; it was named by representative Joseph P. Jordan. Until the early 20th century, the vast majority of Transylvania County residents subsisted through agriculture, growing staples such as potatoes and cabbage.

Beginning in the early 20th century, with Joseph Silversteen's Toxaway Tanning Co. in what was renamed as Rosman in 1905, a manufacturing economy began to develop in the county. It relied on timber and related products harvested from the Pisgah National Forest. In the 1930s, Harry Straus opened a paper mill in the Pisgah Forest area; by the mid-20th century, Straus's Ecusta Paper manufacturing site provided jobs to over 3,000 local residents. During the peak industrial years of the 1950s, DuPont had a factory in the county, employing nearly 1,000 more residents.

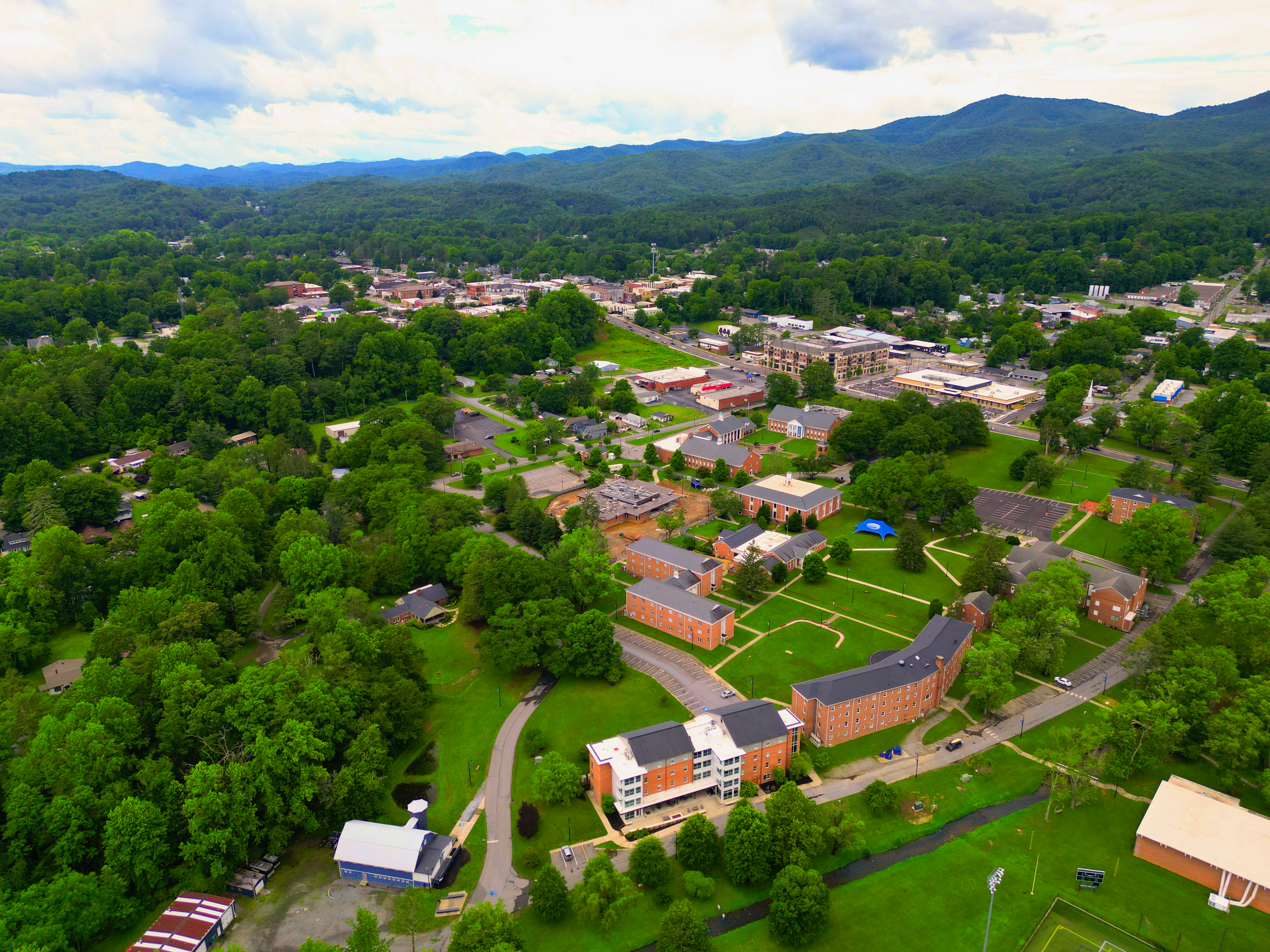
Brevard College campus

In the following decades, Brevard College and its namesake town each grew at dramatic rates. The Brevard Music Center and its summer Brevard Music Festival began to attract musicians and enthusiasts from around the country to Transylvania County.

Since the late 20th century, Transylvania County's economy has changed. Many of the manufacturing operations went defunct or moved offshore for cheap labor, including Ecusta and DuPont. Since then, the county has worked to reshape its economy around the growing summer and winter tourism industry in Appalachia.

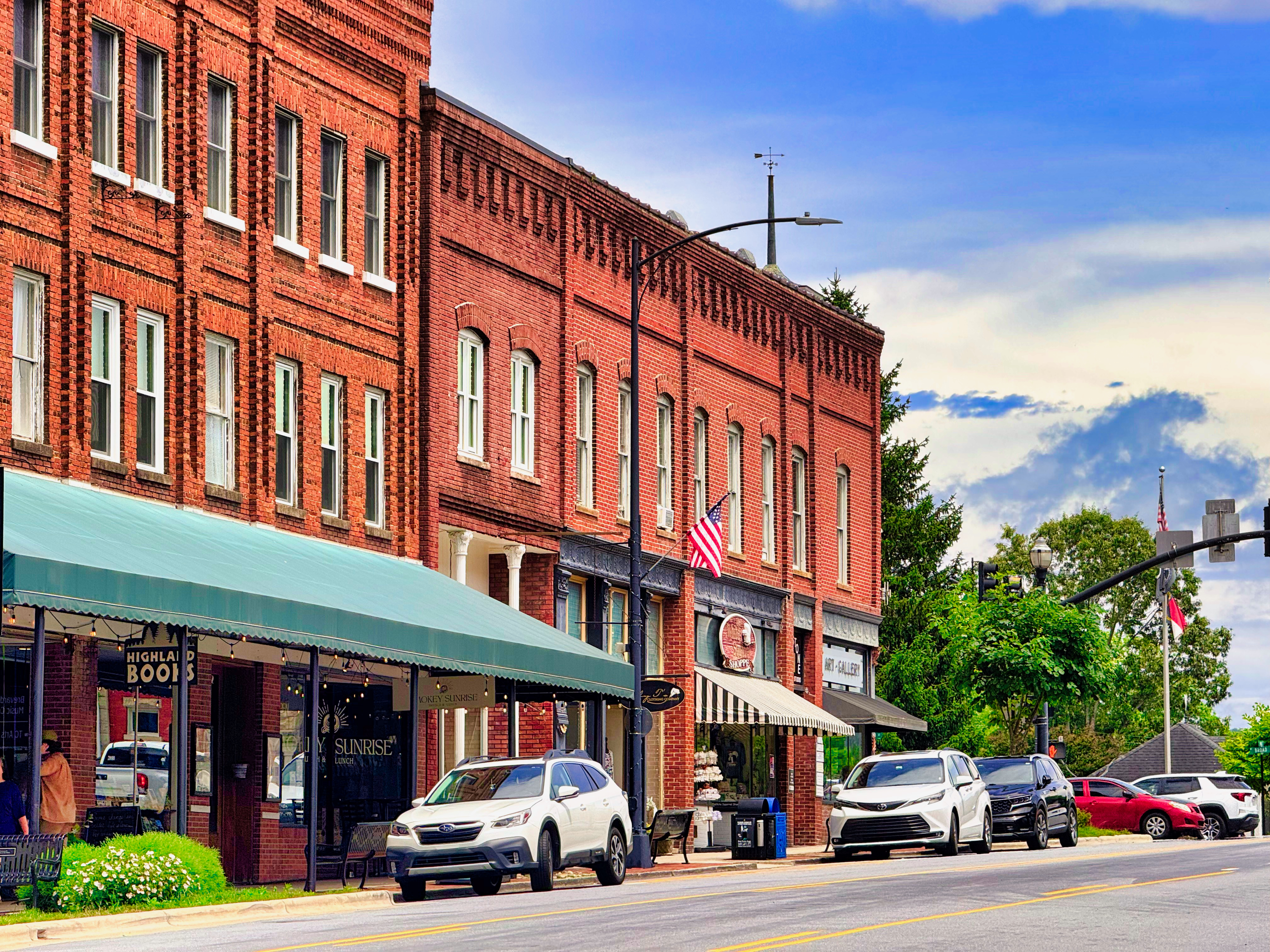
Downtown Brevard

== Geography ==
Interactive map of Transylvania County

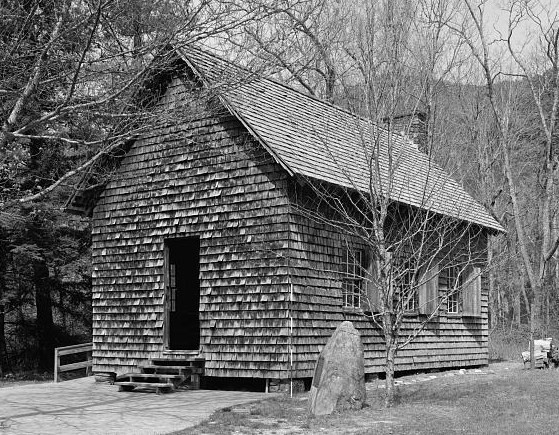
The Biltmore School of Forestry, founded in 1898, was the nation's first forestry school.

According to the U.S. Census Bureau, the county has an area of 380.33 square miles (985.1 km^{2}), of which 378.36 square miles (979.9 km^{2}) is land and 1.97 square miles (5.1 km^{2}) (0.52%) water.

Transylvania County contains the primary headwaters of the French Broad River, locally called North Fork, West Fork, East Fork, and Middle Fork. Since the county's northern and western boundaries follow mountain ridges, all these tributaries originate from sources in the county. The French Broad flows primarily east and northward through the county into Henderson County.

The county's northern border follows the ridge line proximate to the Blue Ridge Parkway, and the southern border mostly follows the Eastern Continental Divide, from the border of Henderson County and South Carolina, westward to near US 178 and Jackson County. The headwaters of Lake Toxaway lie south of the Eastern Continental Divide, becoming the Toxaway River, descending rapidly through Gorges State Park and into Lake Jocassee on the county's southern edge. This area, known as the Cane Brake, is difficult to access from North Carolina due to the steep slope of the trails in Gorges State Park, but can be reached more easily via the Foothills Trail from South Carolina.

Transylvania County is known as the "Land of Waterfalls", due to it having over 250 waterfalls. This is due to a combination of its high precipitation and location on the Blue Ridge Escarpment. Notable waterfalls in the county include Looking Glass Falls, Moore Cove Falls, Rainbow Falls, and Whitewater Falls, the tallest waterfall east of the Mississippi. It receives over 90 inches (2,300 mm) of rain annually due to orographic lift, making it the state's wettest county. (Buncombe County, 30 miles (48 km) northeast, is the driest, as it sits in Transylvania County's rain shadow.) The Blue Ridge Parkway traverses parts of the county, and has views of the Appalachian Mountains, which reach over 6,000 feet (1,800 m) elevation in the county.

=== National protected areas ===
- Blue Ridge Parkway (part)
- Nantahala National Forest (part)
- Pisgah National Forest (part)

=== State and local protected areas ===
- Biltmore Forest School
- Bracken Preserve
- Davidson River Recreational Area
- Dupont State Forest Game Land (part)
- DuPont State Recreational Forest (part)
- Gorges State Park
- Headwaters State Forest
- Headwaters State Forest Game Land
- Pisgah National Forest Game Land (part)
- Southern Highlands Reserve (part)
- Sycamore Flats Recreational Area
- Toxaway Game Land

=== Major water bodies ===
- Atagahi Lake
- Camp Creek Falls
- Cascade Lake
- Dupont Lake
- French Broad River
- Horsepasture River
- Kings Creek
- Lake Jocassee
- Lake Julia
- Lake Toxaway
- Lake Wanteska
- Little River
- North Fork French Broad River
- Shoal Creek
- South Fork Flat Creek
- Thunder Lake
- Thompson River
- Ticoa Lake
- Toxaway Creek

=== Adjacent counties ===
- Henderson County – east
- Greenville County, South Carolina – southeast
- Pickens County, South Carolina – south
- Oconee County, South Carolina – southwest
- Jackson County – west
- Haywood County – northwest
- Buncombe County – northeast

=== Major highways ===
- US 64
- US 64 Bus.
- US 178
- US 276
- NC 215
- NC 280
- NC 281
- Blue Ridge Parkway

== Demographics ==
Historical population
Census	Pop.	Note	%±
1870	3,536		—
1880	5,340		51.0%
1890	5,881		10.1%
1900	6,620		12.6%
1910	7,191		8.6%
1920	9,303		29.4%
1930	9,589		3.1%
1940	12,241		27.7%
1950	15,194		24.1%
1960	16,372		7.8%
1970	19,713		20.4%
1980	23,417		18.8%
1990	25,520		9.0%
2000	29,334		14.9%
2010	33,090		12.8%
2020	32,986		−0.3%
2025 (est.)	34,211	▲	3.7%
U.S. Decennial Census; 1790–1960 1900–1990; 1990–2000 2010 2020

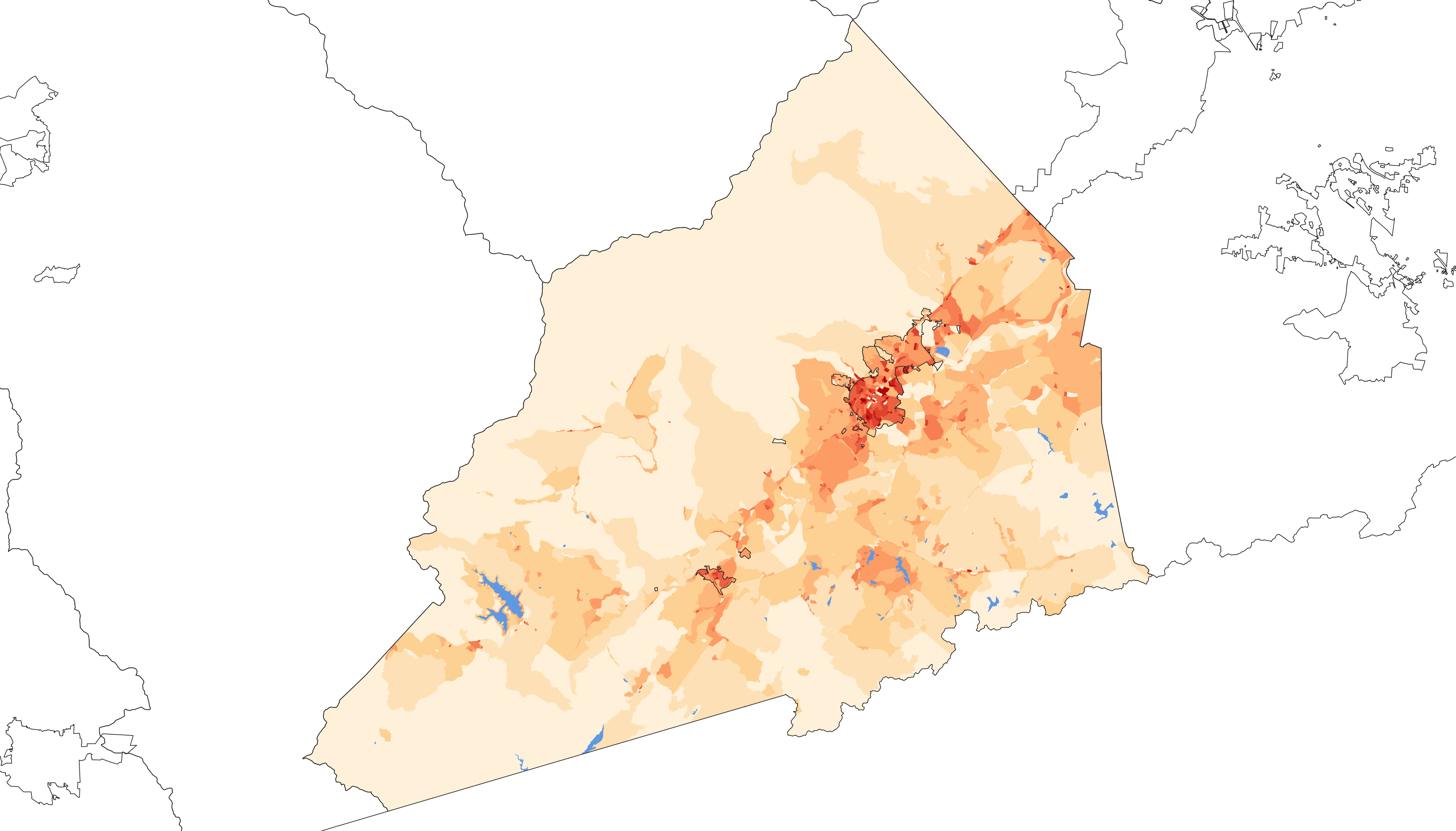
2020 population density of Transylvania County NC by census block

=== 2020 census ===
As of the 2020 census, the county had 32,986 people and 9,978 families, and the median age was 50.4 years.

17.2% of residents were under the age of 18 and 29.9% of residents were 65 years of age or older; for every 100 females there were 92.8 males, and for every 100 females age 18 and over there were 90.5 males.

The racial makeup of the county was 87.8% White, 3.1% Black or African American, 0.4% American Indian and Alaska Native, 0.5% Asian, 0.1% Native Hawaiian and Pacific Islander, 2.6% from some other race, and 5.5% from two or more races. Hispanic or Latino residents of any race comprised 5.1% of the population.

39.6% of residents lived in urban areas, while 60.4% lived in rural areas.

Of the 14,385 households, 22.0% had children under the age of 18 living in them. Of all households, 50.5% were married-couple households, 16.7% were households with a male householder and no spouse or partner present, and 27.2% were households with a female householder and no spouse or partner present. About 29.9% of all households were made up of individuals and 16.6% had someone living alone who was 65 years of age or older.

There were 19,025 housing units, of which 24.4% were vacant. Among occupied housing units, 75.0% were owner-occupied and 25.0% were renter-occupied. The homeowner vacancy rate was 2.0% and the rental vacancy rate was 8.0%.

=== Racial and ethnic composition ===
Transylvania County, North Carolina – Racial and ethnic composition Note: the US Census treats Hispanic/Latino as an ethnic category. This table excludes Latinos from the racial categories and assigns them to a separate category. Hispanics/Latinos may be of any race.
Race / Ethnicity (NH = Non-Hispanic)	Pop 1980	Pop 1990	Pop 2000	Pop 2010	Pop 2020	% 1980	% 1990	% 2000	% 2010	% 2020
White alone (NH)	21,981	24,004	27,305	30,049	28,542	93.87%	94.06%	93.08%	90.81%	86.53%
Black or African American alone (NH)	1,236	1,185	1,228	1,279	1,027	5.28%	4.64%	4.19%	3.87%	3.11%
Native American or Alaska Native alone (NH)	31	78	76	93	102	0.13%	0.31%	0.26%	0.28%	0.31%
Asian alone (NH)	54	98	111	143	173	0.23%	0.38%	0.38%	0.43%	0.52%
Native Hawaiian or Pacific Islander alone (NH)	x	x	7	8	22	x	x	0.02%	0.02%	0.07%
Other race alone (NH)	19	1	13	33	115	0.08%	0.00%	0.04%	0.10%	0.35%
Mixed race or Multiracial (NH)	x	x	296	521	1,307	x	x	1.01%	1.57%	3.96%
Hispanic or Latino (any race)	96	154	298	964	1,698	0.41%	0.60%	1.02%	2.91%	5.15%
Total	23,417	25,520	29,334	33,090	32,986	100.00%	100.00%	100.00%	100.00%	100.00%

=== 2010 census ===
At the 2010 census, there were 33,090 people, 14,394 households, and 8,660 families residing in the county. The population density was 83 people per square mile (32 people/km^{2}). There were 15,553 housing units at an average density of 41 units per square mile (16 units/km^{2}). The racial makeup of the county was 92.4% White, 3.9% Black or African American, 0.3% Native American, 0.4% Asian, and 1.12% from two or more races. 2.9% of the population were Hispanic or Latino of any race.

There were 12,320 households, out of which 25.10% had children under the age of 18 living with them, 58.60% were married couples living together, 8.70% had a female householder with no husband present, and 29.70% were non-families. 26.10% of all households were made up of individuals, and 12.40% had someone living alone who was 65 years of age or older. The average household size was 2.30 and the average family size was 2.74.

In the county, the population was spread out, with 20.40% under the age of 18, 8.20% from 18 to 24, 23.10% from 25 to 44, 26.90% from 45 to 64, and 21.40% who were 65 years of age or older. The median age was 44 years. For every 100 females there were 92.70 males. For every 100 females age 18 and over, there were 89.50 males.

The median income for a household in the county was $38,587, and the median income for a family was $45,579. Males had a median income of $31,743 versus $21,191 for females. The per capita income for the county was $20,767. About 6.60% of families and 9.50% of the population were below the poverty line, including 11.80% of those under age 18 and 7.00% of those age 65 or over.

== Government and politics ==
Transylvania is a solidly Republican county in federal elections, although less so than most of Appalachia. No Democratic presidential nominee has carried Transylvania County since Jimmy Carter did so in 1976. In 2024, Democratic gubernatorial candidate Josh Stein flipped the county, marking the first time a democratic gubernatorial candidate had won the county in 20 years.

United States presidential election results for Transylvania County, North Carolina
Year	Republican		Democratic		Third party(ies)	
Year	No.	%	No.	%	No.	%
1912	107	8.39%	631	49.45%	538	42.16%
1916	841	50.60%	821	49.40%	0	0.00%
1920	1,680	52.14%	1,542	47.86%	0	0.00%
1924	1,814	50.22%	1,776	49.17%	22	0.61%
1928	2,165	55.70%	1,722	44.30%	0	0.00%
1932	1,671	39.63%	2,523	59.84%	22	0.52%
1936	2,001	41.29%	2,845	58.71%	0	0.00%
1940	2,019	37.87%	3,312	62.13%	0	0.00%
1944	2,251	42.71%	3,019	57.29%	0	0.00%
1948	2,861	46.42%	2,975	48.27%	327	5.31%
1952	4,047	52.64%	3,641	47.36%	0	0.00%
1956	3,901	53.18%	3,435	46.82%	0	0.00%
1960	4,221	55.47%	3,388	44.53%	0	0.00%
1964	3,547	44.17%	4,483	55.83%	0	0.00%
1968	4,033	46.85%	2,210	25.67%	2,365	27.47%
1972	5,860	69.73%	2,321	27.62%	223	2.65%
1976	4,089	46.51%	4,636	52.74%	66	0.75%
1980	4,826	52.60%	4,008	43.68%	341	3.72%
1984	6,956	64.91%	3,733	34.83%	28	0.26%
1988	7,009	61.86%	4,280	37.78%	41	0.36%
1992	5,984	45.55%	5,120	38.97%	2,033	15.48%
1996	6,734	52.29%	4,842	37.60%	1,301	10.10%
2000	9,011	63.35%	5,044	35.46%	170	1.20%
2004	9,386	60.21%	6,097	39.11%	105	0.67%
2008	9,401	55.60%	7,275	43.02%	233	1.38%
2012	9,634	57.47%	6,826	40.72%	303	1.81%
2016	10,520	58.87%	6,558	36.70%	791	4.43%
2020	11,636	57.03%	8,444	41.38%	324	1.59%
2024	11,492	55.30%	8,972	43.18%	316	1.52%

Transylvania County has a council-manager form of government, with a five-member Board of Commissioners elected at large. The Commissioners hire and supervise a separate County Manager. The current County Manager is Jaime Laughter. The current members of the Board of Commissioners are Teresa McCall (chair), Larry Chapman (vice chair), Jason Chappell, Jake Dalton, and Chase McKelvey.

Transylvania Regional Hospital (TRH) was formed in 1933 with the mission to serve the community's health care needs. A 94-bed facility fully accredited by the Joint Commission on Accreditation of Healthcare Organizations (JCAHO), it has more than 120 active, consulting and courtesy physicians representing a full spectrum of specialties.

Transylvania County is a member of the Land-of-Sky Regional Council of governments.

The current mayor of Brevard is Maureen Copelof. The current mayor of Rosman is Brian Shelton.

== Points of interest ==
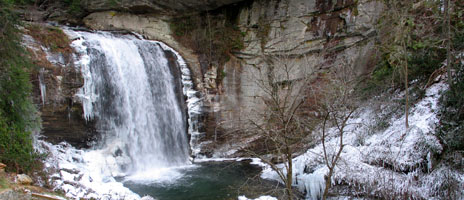
Looking Glass Falls

- Biltmore Forest School, first school of forestry in North America
- Blue Ridge Community College, Transylvania campus
- Blue Ridge Parkway
- Brevard College
- Brevard Little Theater
- Brevard Music Center
- DuPont State Forest
- Gorges State Park
- Lake Toxaway
- Looking Glass Falls
- Nantahala National Forest
- Pisgah Astronomical Research Institute
- Pisgah National Forest
- Sliding Rock
- Transylvania Arts Council
- Transylvania County Schools
- Whitewater Falls, highest waterfall in North Carolina

== Communities ==
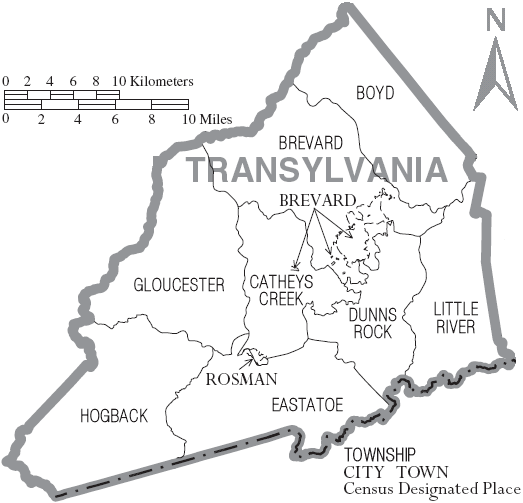
Map of Transylvania County with municipal and township labels

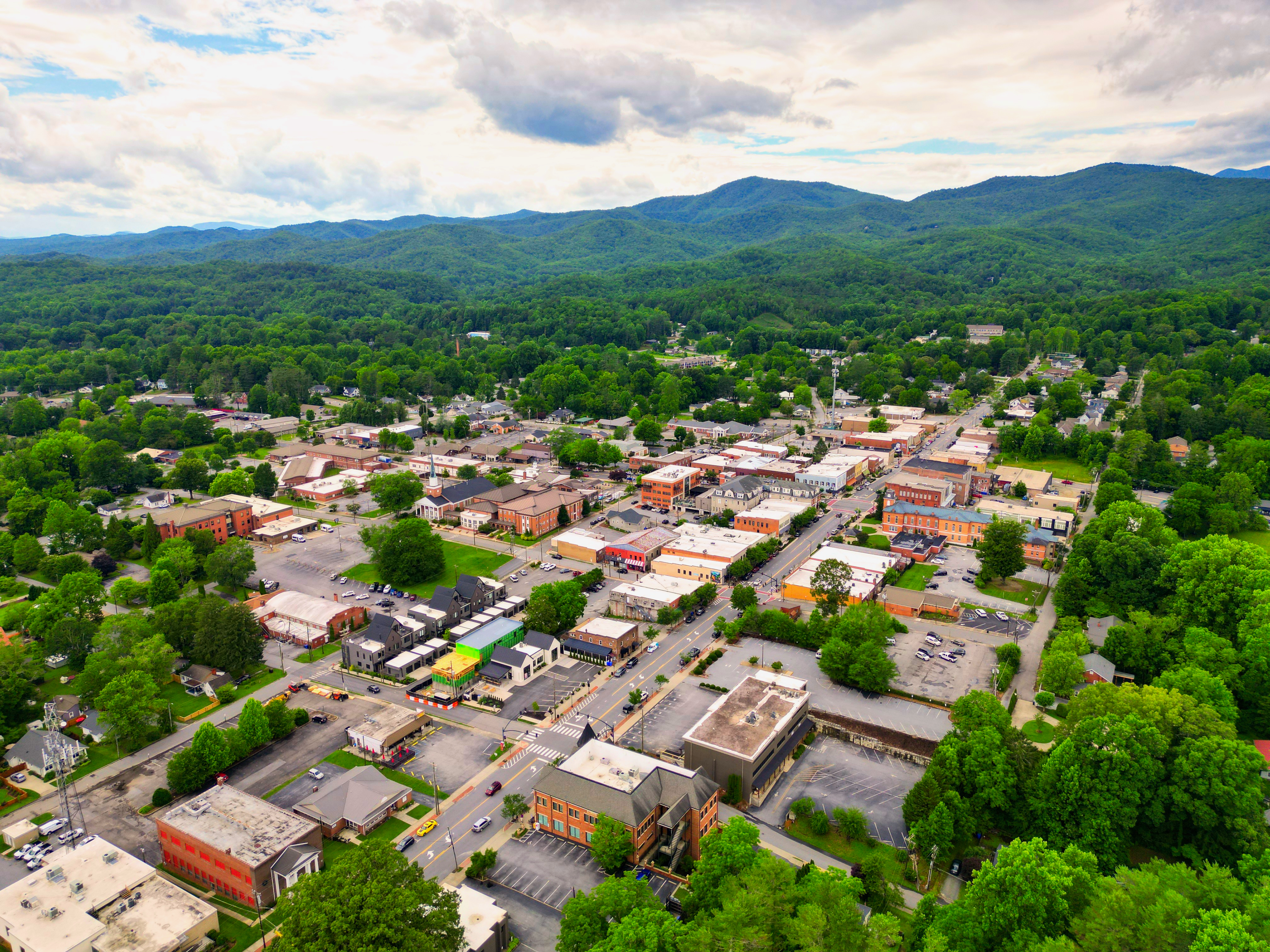
Aerial view of downtown Brevard

=== City ===
- Brevard (county seat and largest community)

=== Town ===
- Rosman

=== Townships ===
- Boyd
- Brevard
- Cathey's Creek
- Dunn's Rock
- Eastatoe
- Gloucester
- Hogback
- Little River

=== Unincorporated communities ===
- Balsam Grove
- Blantyre
- Cedar Mountain
- Lake Toxaway
- Penrose
- Pisgah Forest
- Sapphire

== See also ==
- Brevard High School
- List of counties in North Carolina
- National Register of Historic Places listings in Transylvania County, North Carolina
