= List of nature centers in North Carolina =

This is a list of nature centers and environmental education centers in the state of North Carolina.

To use the sortable tables: click on the icons at the top of each column to sort that column in alphabetical order; click again for reverse alphabetical order.

Name	Location	County	Region	Summary
Agapé Center for Environmental Education	Fuquay-Varina	Wake	Triangle	website, 624 acres, experiential learning about the environment for groups
Airlie Gardens	Wilmington	New Hanover	Eastern	67 acres, formal gardens with environmental education programs for youth and adults
Alligator River National Wildlife Refuge	Manteo	Dare	Eastern	Visitor center with exhibits about the ecosystem of the refuge, conservation, education programs
Annie Louise Wilkerson Nature Preserve	Raleigh	Wake	Triangle	website, 156 acres, operated by the City
Bald Head Island Conservancy	Bald Head Island	Brunswick	Eastern	Family adventure programs, summer camps, nature tours, turtle walks
Balsam Mountain Preserve	Sylva	Jackson		website, operated by the Balsam Mountain Trust, about 4,400 acres, nature center includes live animals, general public must have confirmed reservations to visit
Bass Lake Park	Holly Springs	Wake	Triangle	website, park features 100-acre lake stocked for fishing, nature center with native animal exhibits, operated by the City
Betsy-Jeff Penn 4-H Educational Center	Reidsville	Rockingham		website, almost 200 acres, research based educational experiences for schools and groups, summer camp
Blue Jay Point County Park	Raleigh	Wake	Triangle	website, 236 acres, operated by the County
Blue Planet Water Environmental Center	Huntersville	Mecklenburg	Charlotte area	website, hands-on educational center about water and wastewater, operated by Charlotte-Mecklenburg Utilities
Carolina Beach State Park	Carolina Beach	New Hanover	Eastern	761 acres, visitor center exhibits about the park's carnivorous plants
Carolina Raptor Center	Charlotte	Mecklenburg	Charlotte area	website, raptor rehabilitation center with exhibits
Centennial Campus Center for Wildlife Education	Raleigh	Wake	Triangle	website, headquarters of the North Carolina Wildlife Resources Commission, features wetland exhibits and overlook, exhibits about wildlife conservation in North Carolina
Clark Park Nature Center	Fayetteville	Cumberland	Eastern	website, 72 acres, operated by the City
Clemmons Educational State Forest	Clayton	Johnston	Eastern	Features Forestry Exhibit Center with interactive exhibits about the ecology of forests, soil, water, wildlife and the state's cultural history
Cool Springs Environmental Education Center	New Bern	Craven		website, 1,700 acres of forestland along the Neuse River, programs on forests and forestry, operated by Weyerhaeuser, requires appointment
Crowder District Park	Apex	Wake	Triangle	website, 33 acres, operated by the County
Dan Nicholas Park	Salisbury	Rowan	Charlotte area	website, operated by the County, park with wildlife, nature center, carousel, water park, small farm with animals, other family attractions
Discovery Place Nature	Charlotte	Mecklenburg	Charlotte area	Interactive nature exhibits and live animal displays of the Piedmont region, adjacent to 98-acre Freedom Park, operated by Discovery Place
Foothills Equestrian Nature Center	Tryon	Polk	Western	website, 384 acres
Frank Sharpe Jr. Wildlife Education Center	Greensboro	Guilford	Piedmont Triad	website, operated in 250-acre Bur-Mil Park
Goose Creek State Park	Washington	Beaufort	Eastern	1,327 acres, includes environmental education and visitor center with exhibits, a wet lab
Grandfather Mountain	Linville	Avery	Western	2,456 acres, part preserve and part state park, features nature museum, naturalist programs
Hanging Rock State Park	Danbury	Stokes	Piedmont Triad	7,049 acres, visitor center features hands-on exhibits about plants and animals, video, programs
Highlands Nature Center	Highlands	Macon	Western	website, open seasonally, exhibits about the biodiversity of the southern Appalachian region, operated by the Highlands Biological Foundation
Howell Woods	Four Oaks	Johnston	Eastern	website, 2,800 acre environmental learning center operated by Johnston Community College
Kaleideum North	Winston-Salem	Forsyth		Science museum and 15 acre environmental park
Kerr Lake State Recreation Area	Henderson	Vance	Triangle	50,000-acre man-made lake, Satterwhite Point visitor center features an exhibit hall, programs, also W. Kerr Scott Lake’s Environmental Education Center
Latta Plantation Nature Center and Preserve	Huntersville	Mecklenburg	Charlotte area	website, 1,351 acres, operated by the County
Lee Park Nature Center	Sanford	Lee	Eastern	website, 177 acres, operated by the County
McDowell Nature Center and Preserve	Charlotte	Mecklenburg	Charlotte area	website, 1,107 acres, operated by the County
Museum of Coastal Carolina	Ocean Isle Beach	Brunswick	Eastern	Natural history museum with dioramas and exhibits about the natural science, environment, and cultural history of the coastal region of the Carolinas
Museum of Life and Science	Durham	Durham	Triangle	84 acres, natural history and science museum with insectarium and live animals, 6 acres wetland with boardwalk and live native animals, a farmyard, railroad and more
Neuseway Nature Center and Planetarium	Kinston	Lenoir	Eastern	55 acres, includes touch tank, live native animals, Lenoir Memorial Hospital Health & Science Museum, planetarium and campgrounds
North Carolina Arboretum	Asheville	Buncombe	Western	434 acres, arboretum and botanical garden, 10 miles of hiking and biking trails, youth and adult nature programs
North Carolina Estuarium	Washington	Beaufort	Eastern	website, operated by the Partnership for the Sounds, ecology of North Carolina's estuaries, especially the Pamlico River, Tar River and Pamlico Sound
Oak Island Nature Center	Oak Island	Brunswick	Eastern	information, operated by the Town, open seasonally
Onslow County Environmental Education Center & Sneads Ferry Branch Library	Sneads Ferry	Onslow	Eastern	website, display of county ecology, geography, flora, and fauna inside the branch library
Outer Banks Center for Wildlife Education	Corolla	Currituck	Eastern	website, operated by the North Carolina Wildlife Resources Commission, located in Currituck Heritage Park, natural and cultural history of northeastern North Carolina, features aquarium, waterfowl decoy gallery
Piedmont Environmental Center	High Point	Guilford	Piedmont Triad	website, 376 acres, operated by the City, 11 miles of trails
Piedmont Wildlife Center	Durham	Durham	Triangle	Located at 82-acre Leigh Farm Park
Pisgah Center for Wildlife Education	Pisgah Forest	Transylvania	Western	website, located in Pisgah National Forest, operated by the North Carolina Wildlife Resources Commission, features trout hatchery
Prairie Ridge Ecostation	Raleigh	Wake	Triangle	45 acres, operated by the North Carolina Museum of Natural Sciences
Reedy Creek Nature Center and Preserve	Charlotte	Mecklenburg	Charlotte area	737 acres, operated by the County, over 10 miles of trails, features live, native animals, an exhibit hall, a classroom
Stevens Nature Center at Hemlock Bluffs Nature Preserve	Cary	Wake	Triangle	140 acres, operated by the Town
Sturgeon City	Jacksonville	Onslow	Eastern	website, restored wetlands around a former wastewater treatment plant, environmental and science programs
Sylvan Heights Bird Park	Scotland Neck	Halifax		website, 18-acre park features aviaries displaying birds from around the work, gardens, education about waterfowl, wildlife and wetland conservation
A Time for Science	Grifton	Pitt	Eastern	website, nature and science learning center located at the 200-acre Bray Hollow Conservancy
Walnut Creek Wetland Center	Raleigh	Wake	Triangle	website, 59 acres, operated by the City
Walter B Jones, Sr. Center for The Sounds	Columbia	Tyrrell	Eastern	Natural history of the Pocosin Lakes National Wildlife Refuge
Walter L. Stasavich Science and Nature Center	Greenville	Pitt	Eastern	website, operated by the City in 324-acre River Park North
Western North Carolina Nature Center	Asheville	Buncombe	Western	Operated by the City, 40-acre zoological park with animals and plants native to the Southern Appalachian region
Weymouth Woods-Sandhills Nature Preserve	Southern Pines	Moore	Sandhills	898 acres, state park and preserve with natural history museum and environmental education programs
William B. Umstead State Park	Raleigh	Wake	Triangle	5,439 acres, visitor center exhibits, education programs
White Deer Park and Nature Center	Garner	Wake	Triangle	website, 96 acres, operated by the Town
