= Myers Park (Charlotte) =

Historic district in North Carolina, USA

- Myers Park Historic District
- U.S. National Register of Historic Places
- U.S. Historic district
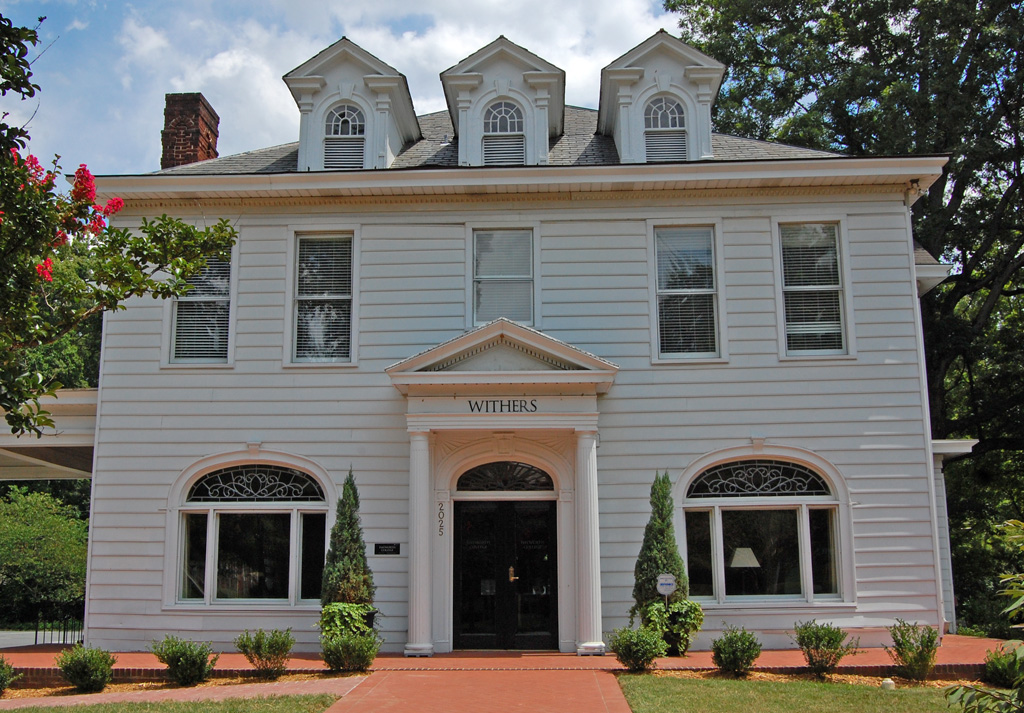
- Withers Building, Queens University campus, July 2007

- Location within North Carolina Location within the United States
- Location: Roughly bounded by NC 16, E and W Queens Rd., and Lillington Ave., Charlotte, North Carolina
- Coordinates: 35°11′33″N 80°49′59″W
- Area: 597 acres (242 ha)
- Architect: John Nolen; Earle Sumner Draper; Louis H. Asbury
- Architectural style: Colonial Revival, Bungalow/craftsman, Tudor Revival
- NRHP reference No.: 87000655
- Added to NRHP: August 10, 1987

Myers Park is a neighborhood and historic district in Charlotte, North Carolina, United States. Nearby neighborhoods include Dilworth and Sedgefield to the west, Eastover to the east, Uptown Charlotte to the north, and SouthPark and Foxcroft to the south. The Little Sugar Creek Greenway runs along the western edge of the neighborhood, adjacent to Freedom Park. Though its boundaries originally coincided with the boundaries of the 1,220-acre (4.9 km^{2}) John Spring Myers farm, the neighborhood, by 2008, comprised 2,200 acres (8.9 km^{2}) and had a population of 9,809. Myers Park is bounded by Queens Road to the north, Providence Road to the east, Sharon Road to the south, and Park Road to the west.

== Demographics ==
Of the 9,809 people living in Myers Park in 2008, 2,249 were under 18 years of age; approx. 1,511 were over 64 years of age. There were 4,643 housing units in Myers Park. In 2024, the median household income of 28207 (Myers Park's zip code) was $230,889. The average home value was $1,597,112.

== Culture ==
Myers Park is home to the "Booty Loop", a popular 2.85-mile walking, running, and cycling route. The route follows Queens Road to Selwyn Avenue, turns right down Queens Road West to Hopedale Avenue and then right back onto Queens Road, completing the loop. The cycling loop is also the original home to the 24 Hours of Booty annual charitable event, hosted by the 24 Foundation. The 24 hour fundraising event draws hundreds of cyclists and thousands of spectators each year.

The neighborhood's central location and wide, tree lined streets make it a popular choice to include in event routes for local charity runs and the Charlotte Marathon.

== Transportation ==
=== Mass transit ===
The following buses from the Charlotte Area Transit System (CATS) serve Myers Park and the surrounding neighborhoods:

- #6 (Kings Drive)
- #14 (Providence Road)
- #15 (Randolph Road)
- #18 (Selwyn Avenue)
- #19 (Park Road)
- #20 (Queens/Sharon Road)

=== Roads ===
Providence Road, Kings Drive, and Queens Road are major thoroughfares in Myers Park. The intersection of "Queens and Queens and Providence and Providence" in front of the Myers Park Library is well-known for being described as "non-sensical" and "horribly confusing" by those who have experienced it before. When traveling toward Uptown Charlotte on Providence Road, you actually have to turn right at the intersection to remain on Providence Road.

== Education and libraries ==
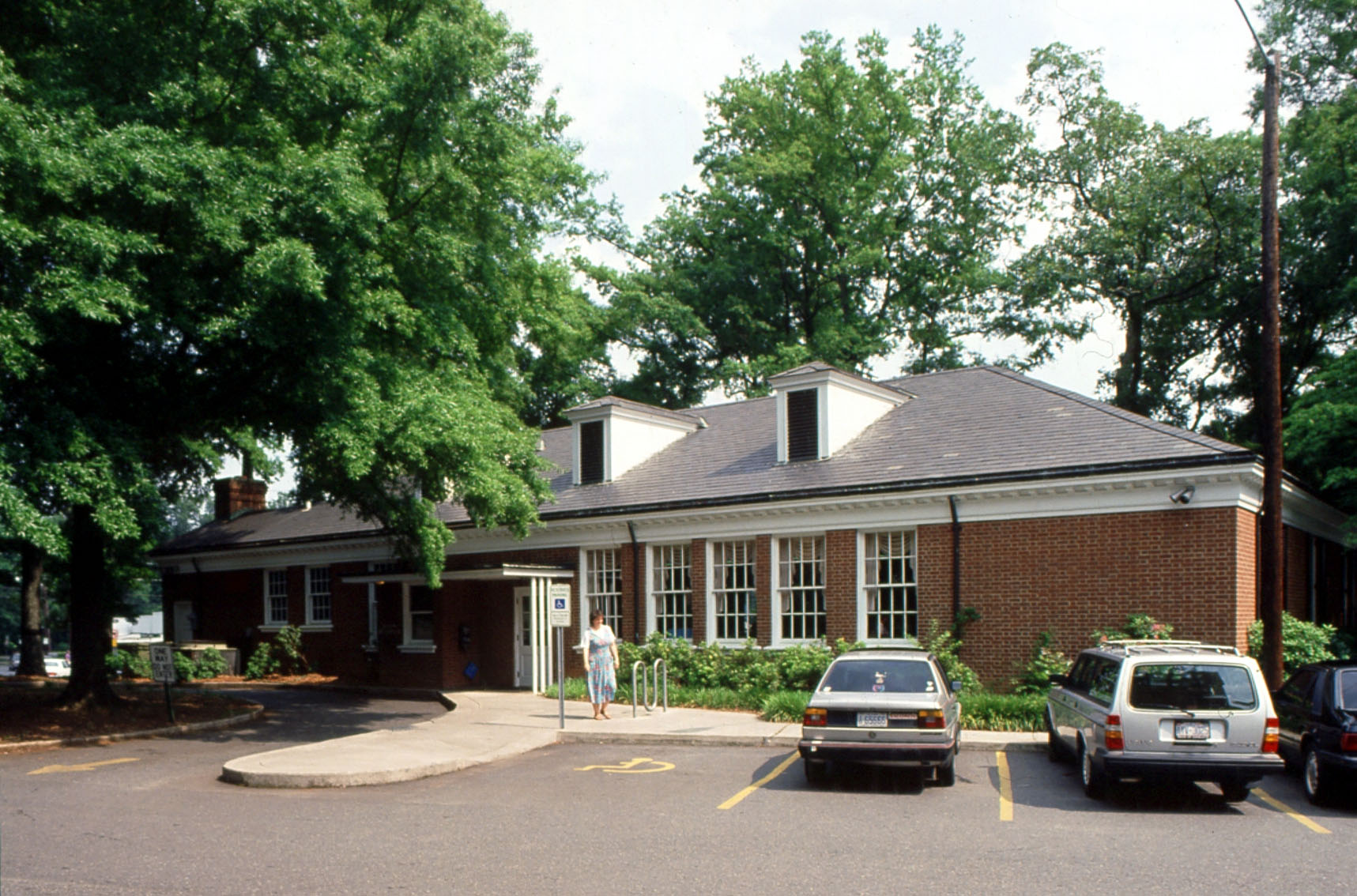
The Myers Park branch of the Public Library of Charlotte and Mecklenburg County

=== School system ===
Residents of Myers Park attend Charlotte-Mecklenburg Schools, including Myers Park High School, Alexander Graham Middle School, Myers Park Traditional Elementary School, and Selwyn Elementary School.

Myers Park is served by the Myers Park Branch of the Public Library of Charlotte and Mecklenburg County. The library is located at the corner of Queens Road and Providence Road.

== Historic district ==
The Myers Park Historic District is a national historic district encompassing 670 contributing buildings, four contributing sites, and contributing structures in Myers Park. It was developed after 1911 and includes notable examples of Bungalow / American Craftsman, Colonial Revival, and Tudor Revival style architecture. It was added to the National Register of Historic Places in 1995.

=== Notable historic structures ===
- Elizabeth Lawrence House and Garden (1949)
- H.M. McAden House (1917) designed by architect Louis H. Asbury
- J. Luther Snyder House (1920)
- John Jamison House (1912)
- Lambeth-Gossett House (1916)
- James Buchanan Duke House (1914)
- Country Club Rockledge (1914), former main building of Horner Military Academy
- Queens College campus, five buildings dating to 1916
- Myers Park Moravian Church (1924)
- Myers Park Presbyterian Church (1928)
- Myers Park United Methodist Church (1929)

=== Other sites of interest ===
- Christ Episcopal Church
- Little Church on the Lane – originally Myers Park Moravian Church
- Manor Theatre – one of Charlotte's oldest movie theatres, permanently closed in 2020
- Edgehill Park
- Theatre Charlotte – Charlotte's oldest arts organization and the state's longest running community theatre
- Wing Haven Gardens and Bird Sanctuary

== Notable residents ==
- James Buchanan Duke, American Tobacco Company founder and benefactor of Duke University
- Lauren Holt, actress and comedian
- Pat McCrory, politician, former Governor of North Carolina
- Ann McCrory, former First Lady of North Carolina
- Cameron A. Morrison, former Governor of North Carolina
- Angelia Lawrance Morrison Harris, former First Lady of North Carolina
- Sara Virginia Ecker Watts Morrison, former First Lady of North Carolina
- Russell M. Robinson II, lawyer
- Sally Dalton Robinson, philanthropist
- Josephine McDonald Yarbrough, writer and clubwoman
