= 1996 North Carolina Secretary of State election =

North Carolina election

- November 5, 1996
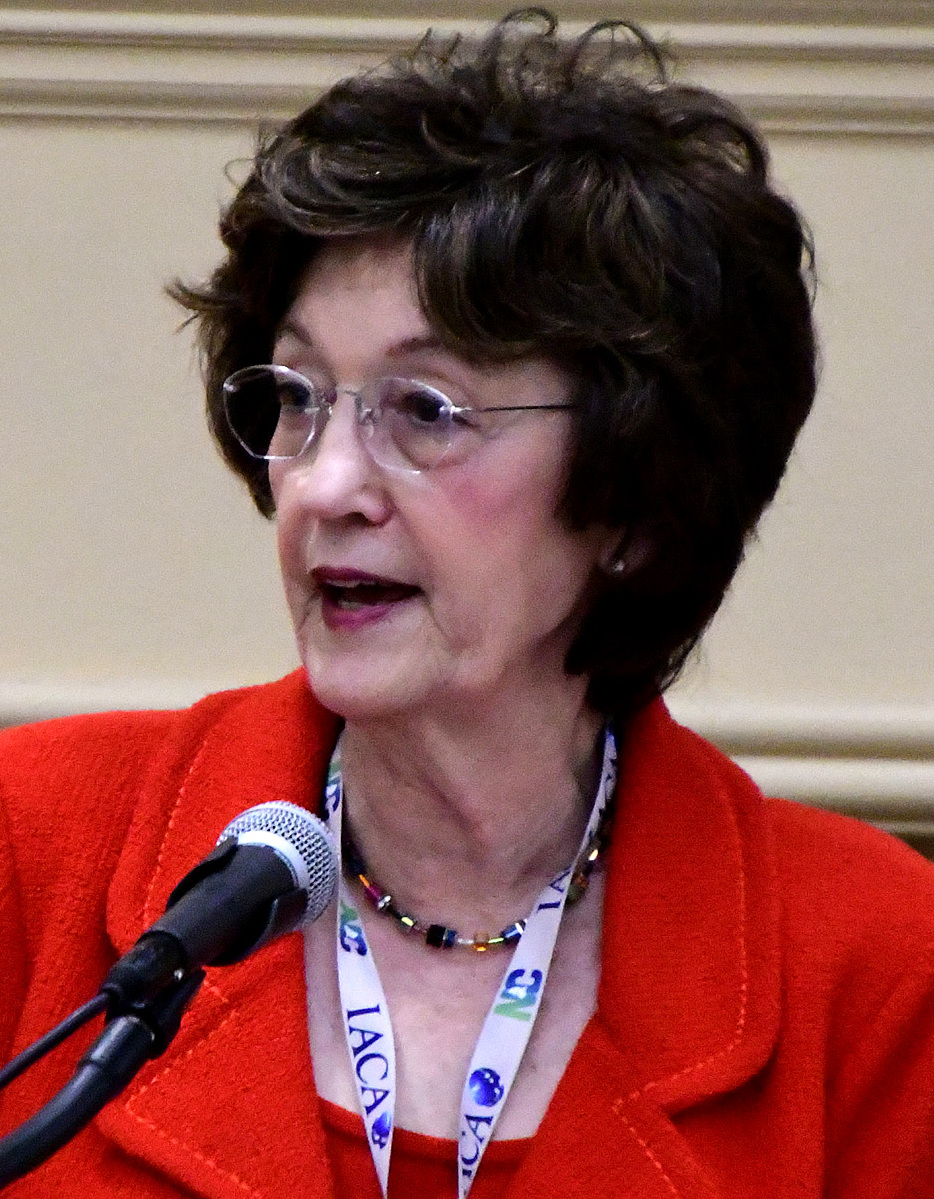

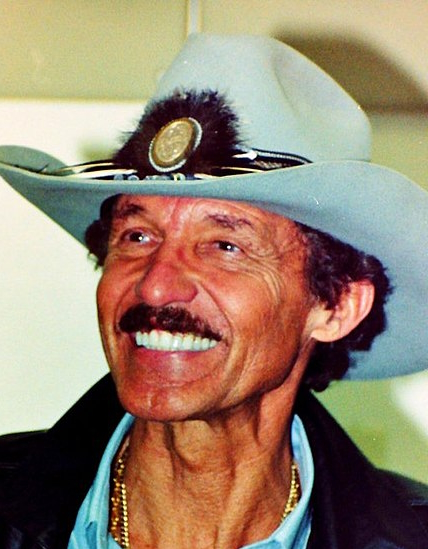
Nominee	Elaine Marshall	Richard Petty
Party	Democratic	Republican
Popular vote	1,333,994	1,126,701
Percentage	53.48%	45.17%
- County results Marshall: 50–60% 60–70% 70–80% 80–90% Petty: 40-50% 50–60% 60–70% 70–80%
Secretary of State before election
Rufus Edmisten
Democratic
Elected Secretary of State
Elaine Marshall
Democratic

The 1996 North Carolina Secretary of State election was held on November 5, concurrently with that year's U.S. presidential election, as well as elections for Governor, U.S. Senator, and Council of State. Attorney and former Democratic State Senator Elaine Marshall ran for the open Secretary of State position against stock car racer and former Randolph County commissioner known as "The King", Richard Petty. Marshall won the race.

== Background ==
Proceeding the election, State Auditor Ralph Campbell Jr. discovered that Secretary of State Rufus Edmisten had allegedly engaged in "unacceptable behavior" that included illegal procurement of a job for his friend, Rosemary McBryde, as well as his use of state employees for personal work, and circumvention of speeding laws with an undercover license plate. The auditor's 132-page report describing Edmisten's misconduct was sent to Attorney General Michael F. Easley. Effective March 31, 1996, Secretary of State Edmisten resigned from his post, seeking opportunities in the fields of law and business. In a press release, Edmisten stated, "I am satisfied that we have proved worthy of the public trust. Of course, my competent and hard-working staff deserves the credit."

North Carolina is considered to be the birthplace of NASCAR, and the state is still home to most race teams and drivers. Richard Petty, nicknamed "The King" for his success in the sport, won a record 200 NASCAR Cup Series race wins, as well as 7 NASCAR Cup Series championships, tied with Dale Earnhardt and Jimmie Johnson for the most. Not a complete political outsider, Petty had been County Commissioner in Randolph County for 16 years. Prior to Edmisten's resignation, Petty had been preparing to run against the incumbent Secretary of State, whom the press noted was also a NASCAR-loving "good ol' boy" with a similar political base to Petty. No Republican primary for Secretary of State was held, as "The King" ran uncontested for that party's nomination. Other Republicans on the ballot hoped to ride his coattails, such as future Insurance Commissioner Mike Causey, who said "I need to draw the Democrat vote, and I know he can do that."

== Democratic primary ==
=== Candidates ===
==== Nominee ====
- Elaine Marshall, attorney, former national secretary of Young Democrats of America (1977–1979), Harnett County Democratic Party Chair (1991–1992) and State Senator for North Carolina's 15th district (1993–1995)

==== Eliminated in runoff ====
- Valeria Lynch Lee, program officer for the Z. Smith Reynolds Foundation, founder and former general manager of WVSP public radio (1973–1985), and UNC Board of Governors member (1993–1995)

==== Eliminated in primary ====
- Brenda Pollard, former executive assistant to Secretary of State Thad Eure (1971–1989)
- Howard Kramer, lawyer and campaign operative for Robert Morgan (1974), Jimmy Carter (1976), Rufus Edmisten (1984), and Harry Payne (1992)
- Joyce Hill-Langston, retired Greensboro Housing Authority grants writer
- Mort Hurst, former Robersonville City Council member (1981-1989)

=== Primary results ===
Results by county: Marshall: 70-80% 60-70% 50-60% 40-50% 30-40% <30%; Lee: 50-60% 40-50% 30-40% <30%; Pollard: 30-40% <30%; Kramer: <30%; Langston: <30%; Hurst: <30%; Tie: Marshall and Kramer tied

Democratic primary results
Party	Candidate	Votes	%
Democratic	Elaine Marshall	130,520	27.13%
Democratic	Valeria Lynch Lee	98,581	20.49%
Democratic	Brenda Pollard	83,332	17.32%
Democratic	Howard Kramer	70,000	14.55%
Democratic	Joyce Hill-Langston	67,583	14.05%
Democratic	Mort Hurst	31,143	6.47%
Total votes		481,159	100.0%

=== Runoff results ===
Runoff results (2,378 of 2,522 precincts reporting)
Party	Candidate	Votes	%
Democratic	Elaine Marshall	68,258	60.48%
Democratic	Valeria Lynch Lee	44,601	39.52%
Total votes		112,859	100.0%

== General election ==
=== Campaign ===
Petty's campaign strategy mostly consisted of travelling across the state to connect with his many fans, signing autographs and asking for their votes. When his campaign bus rolled through rural North Carolina, stunned citizens like Connie Perry of Bunn reacted, "Nothing ever happens around here. That's the highlight of our life. Of course, I'm going to vote for him." Perry's coworker at the Silver Spring Grill, Rhonda Cox, "about squeezed his neck to death."

Elaine Marshall attacked Petty for refusing to put his racing businesses in a blind trust and for his comments about continuing to appear in commercials for Pepsi and STP as well as continuing to race stock cars if he won. Richard Petty took pride in his ethical fundraising practices, saying "the only people I'm going to owe anything to is the people who vote for me. I don't want to owe anyone nothing." He was reported as telling his campaign manager, Bill Colby, "don't promise anybody nothing and don't take any money from anybody who wants something."

==== Hit-and-run incident ====
On September 11, 1996, on his way home from Charlotte Motor Speedway, Richard Petty was brake-checked while tailgating another driver. The incident resulted in a damaged bumper and a $25 ticket, which was later raised to a $65 fine and license penalty for "following too close." Richard Petty said that "the Democrats have nothing to criticize me for except the dumb things I do to myself," and attacked the "Democrat-controlled state police" for making him "a political victim." The press reported on the incident as both a high-profile celebrity scandal and a question of Petty's readiness to serve in a statewide executive office. The event had an impact on some voters, as one woman interviewed by the Greensboro News & Record said, "how could he have any feeling for you and me when he hit-and-runs somebody?"

=== Results ===
Elaine Marshall underperformed against Governor Jim Hunt, but overperformed some Democratic incumbents such as State Auditor Ralph Campbell Jr. and Labor Commissioner Harry E. Payne Jr. Marshall's coalition, relative to other Democrats, was strongest in her home of Harnett County as well as urban areas like Durham, Chapel Hill, Winston-Salem, Greensboro, and Wilmington. Marshall did not win Republican-leaning western counties that Hunt and other Democrats won that year, such as Polk, Rutherford, Burke, McDowell and Watauga, demonstrating Petty's strength in that portion of the state. Petty also did well in parts of eastern North Carolina, winning Onslow County.

Results by county Marshall: 50–60% 60–70% 70–80% 80–90% Petty: 40-50% 50–60% 60–70% 70–80%

General election results
Party	Candidate	Votes	%
Democratic	Elaine Marshall	1,333,994	53.48
Republican	Richard Petty	1,126,701	45.17
Libertarian	Lewis Guignard	20,734	0.83
Natural Law	Stephen Richter	12,896	0.52
Turnout		2,494,325	

== Aftermath ==
=== Elaine Marshall ===
The first woman elected to a statewide executive office in North Carolina, Elaine Marshall has prioritized making it easier to do business in the state. Marshall was re-elected as Secretary of State of North Carolina every subsequent election including 2024. Mike Causey's plan to win Democrat votes with the help of Petty was a failure, as Democrats won every Council of State election in 1996, but Republican U.S. Senator Jesse Helms won re-election on the same ballot by a wide margin. He was the first of many North Carolina Republicans that Marshall has won statewide elections alongside.

=== Richard Petty ===
Following his landslide defeat, Richard Petty said "if I knew I was going to lose, I wouldn'ta run." He expressed frustration with the political world, saying "don't talk politics today... it'll be a couple years before I think about anything in politics again." He acknowledged the "bump" in traffic did not help his campaign and pinned the loss on his reputation, saying "people see me as Richard Petty, race-car driver, not as Richard Petty, politician." He pointed out that even in politics "we Pettys aren't complete losers", as his wife Lynda had won re-election to the Randolph County Board of Education. Petty has been criticized by some for electoral overconfidence, relying on his name recognition, and failing to make a coherent argument for why he should be the Secretary of State. Additionally, Petty himself pointed out that the traffic incident so close to the election may have reinforced the perception of him as a race car driver, not a steady-handed politician.

== See also ==
- 1996 North Carolina Council of State election
- 1996 United States presidential election in North Carolina
- 1996 United States Senate election in North Carolina
- 1996 United States House of Representatives elections in North Carolina
- 1996 North Carolina gubernatorial election
- 1996 North Carolina lieutenant gubernatorial election
- 1996 North Carolina judicial elections
