= Sally Dalton Robinson =

American philanthropist (born 1934)

- Born: 1934; Charlotte, North Carolina, U.S.
- Education: St. Mary's Junior College; Duke University
- Occupation: philanthropist
- Spouse: Russell M. Robinson, II
- Children: 3

Sally Dalton Robinson (born 1934) is an American philanthropist and civic leader. She was a key figure in the founding of the Levine Museum of the New South in Charlotte, North Carolina and served on the board of the Charlotte Symphony Orchestra, the Charlotte Mecklenburg Library, the Charlotte Nature Museum, the Charlotte Arts and Science Council, and the McColl Center for Art + Innovation. Robinson is an active member of the Junior League and the Episcopal Diocese of North Carolina. She was inducted into the North Carolina Women's Hall of Fame in 2009.

== Early life and education ==
Robinson was born in 1934 in Charlotte, North Carolina. She grew up in the Myers Park Neighborhood. Robinson's childhood years were during World War II, and her mother was very active in the War effort. Four of Robinson's brothers served in the military during the war. As a child, she witnessed German prisoners of war working on building railroads and bridges in Charlotte.

Robinson attended public schools in Charlotte before enrolling at St. Mary's Junior College in Raleigh, North Carolina. After finishing her studies at St. Mary's, she attended Duke University, where she was a member of Phi Beta Kappa, president of her sophomore class in the Woman's College, and graduated with a bachelor's degree in history.

== Philanthropic career ==
In 1958, Robinson joined the Junior League. She served as treasurer, nominating committee chairwoman, and secretary for the Junior League of Charlotte.

Robinson was a founding member of the Levine Museum of the New South and the St. Francis Jobs Program, the latter was later renamed as the BRIDGE Jobs Program. She served on the board of the Charlotte Symphony Orchestra, the Charlotte Arts Science Council, and the McColl Center for Art + Innovation. She also served on the boards of the Charlotte Mecklenburg Library and the Charlotte Nature Museum. She was also involved in various charitable, economic, and religious organizations and served on various boards and in programs at Duke University. Robinson volunteered for the Duke Alumni Admissions Advisory Committee and, from 1995 to 2005, served as the chair and a Trustee of the Duke Student Affairs Committee. She served on the committee that selected Richard H. Brodhead to serve as the university's president. Robinson serves on the board for the Duke Center for Documentary Studies and the Robertson Scholars Program and is the co-chair of the Duke Financial Aid Initiative Committee.

Robinson is a member of the North Carolina Humanities Council's Advisory Committee and serves on the board of the Foundation for the Carolinas, the President's Council of Central Piedmont Community College, the Women's Inter-cultural Exchange, MDC Inc., and the National Humanities Center.

She and her husband were active contributors with the Duke Endowment.

=== Awards and legacy ===
In 1988, Robinson was named Charlotte Woman of the Year. She was the recipient of the University of North Carolina at Charlotte's Distinguished Service Award and the Charlotte Arts and Science Council's Lifetime Commitment Award.

In 2004, the Robinson Hall for the Performing Arts at the University of North Carolina at Charlotte was dedicated in honor of Robinson and her husband. The Robinson Center for Civic Leadership is also named in their honor.

In 2009, she was inducted into the North Carolina Women's Hall of Fame.

In 2013, she and her husband were both recipients of the John Tyler Caldwell Award for the Humanities.

== Personal life ==
She is married to Russel M. Robinson II, a lawyer, founding partner of the law firm Robinson, Bradshaw & Hinson, P.A., and a grandson of William B. Rodman. She and her husband have three children.

She is a member of Christ Episcopal Church in Charlotte.
