= Midtown Park =

Midtown Park may refer to:

- Midtown Park (Charlotte, North Carolina), United States
- Midtown Park, a park in Midtown, Houston, United States
