= 1996 North Carolina Council of State election =

- November 5, 1996

All 10 members of the North Carolina Council of State
	Majority party	Minority party
Party	Democratic	Republican
Last election	10	0
Seats won	10	0
Seat change	Steady	Steady

Elections were held in North Carolina on November 5, 1996, to elect the Council of State. All the races were won by Democrats. All were incumbents except for Elaine Marshall, who won the post of Secretary of State, and Michael E. Ward, who was elected Superintendent of Public Instruction. Both Marshall and Ward succeeded fellow Democrats.

As of 2024, this is the last election where Democrats held all council offices.

== Governor ==
The 1996 North Carolina gubernatorial election was held on November 5, 1996. The general election was fought between the Democratic nominee, incumbent Governor Jim Hunt and the Republican nominee, state representative Robin Hayes. Hunt won by 56% to 43%, winning his fourth term as governor.

Gubernatorial results by county Hunt: 40–50% 50–60% 60–70% 70–80% Hayes: 40–50% 50–60% 60–70%

1996 North Carolina gubernatorial election
Party	Candidate	Votes	%	±%
Democratic	Jim Hunt (incumbent)	1,436,638	55.98	
Republican	Robin Hayes	1,097,053	42.75	
Libertarian	Scott D. Yost	17,559	0.68	
Natural Law	Julia Van Witt	14,792	0.58	
Turnout		2,566,042		
Democratic hold		Swing		

== Lieutenant Governor ==
Lieutenant gubernatorial results by county Wicker: 40–50% 50–60% 60–70% 70–80% 80–90% Arnold: 40–50% 50–60% 60–70%

1996 North Carolina lieutenant governor election
Party	Candidate	Votes	%	±%
Democratic	Dennis A. Wicker (incumbent)	1,500,206	54.50	
Republican	Steve Arnold	1,315,825	44.52	
Natural Law	John Dainotto	23,948	0.97	
Turnout		2,866,383		
Democratic hold		Swing		

== Attorney General ==
Results by county Easley: 50–60%; 60–70%; 70–80%; 80–90%; Edmunds: 50–60%; 60–70%

1996 North Carolina Attorney General election
Party	Candidate	Votes	%	±%
Democratic	Mike Easley (incumbent)	1,453,196	59.07	
Republican	Robert H. Edmunds Jr.	1,007,027	40.93	
Turnout		2,460,223		

== State Auditor ==
Results by county Campbell: 40–50%; 50–60%; 60–70%; 70–80%; Daly: 40–50%; 50–60%; 60–70%; 70–80%

1996 North Carolina State Auditor election
Party	Candidate	Votes	%	±%
Democratic	Ralph Campbell (incumbent)	1,184,665	49.92	
Republican	Jack Daly	1,129,050	47.58	
Libertarian	Robert Dorsey	40,835	1.72	
Natural Law	Theodore Janowski	18,643	0.79	
Turnout		2,373,193		

== Commissioner of Agriculture ==
Results by county Graham: 40–50%; 50–60%; 60–70%; 70–80%; 80–90%; Davidson: 40–50%; 50–60%; 60–70%

1996 North Carolina Commissioner of Agriculture election
Party	Candidate	Votes	%	±%
Democratic	James A. Graham (incumbent)	1,409,801	57.80	
Republican	Tom Davidson	980,224	40.18	
Natural Law	R. Gaines Steer	25,052	1.03	
Libertarian	Eugene Paczelt	24,217	0.99	
Turnout		2,439,294		

== Commissioner of Insurance ==
Results by county Long: 80-90% 70-80% 60-70% 50-60% 40-50% Causey: 60-70% 50-60% 40-50%

1996 North Carolina Commissioner of Insurance election
Party	Candidate	Votes	%	±%
Democratic	James E. Long (incumbent)	1,388,894	56.74	
Republican	Mike Causey	1,010,782	40.93	
Libertarian	Sean Haugh	26,258	1.07	
Natural Law	Stephen Wolfe	21,939	0.90	
Turnout		2,447,873		

== Commissioner of Labor ==
Results by county Payne: 40–50%; 50–60%; 60–70%; 70–80%; Walker: 40–50%; 50–60%; 60–70%

1996 North Carolina Commissioner of Labor election
Party	Candidate	Votes	%	±%
Democratic	Harry Payne (incumbent)	1,212,057	50.98	
Republican	Tracy Walker	1,082,537	45.53	
Natural Law	Mary Ann Cooke	58,342	2.45	
Libertarian	Seth Fehrs	24,574	1.03	
Turnout		2,377,510		

== Secretary of State ==
Secretary of state results by county Marshall: 50–60% 60–70% 70–80% 80–90% Petty: 40-50% 50–60% 60–70% 70–80%

1996 North Carolina Secretary of State election
Party	Candidate	Votes	%	±%
Democratic	Elaine Marshall	1,333,994	53.48	
Republican	Richard Petty	1,126,701	45.17	
Libertarian	Stephen Richter	20,734	0.83	
Natural Law	Lewis Guignard	12,896	0.52	
Turnout		2,494,325		

== Superintendent of Public Instruction ==
Results by county Ward: 40–50%; 50–60%; 60–70%; 70–80%; 80–90%; Robinson: 40–50%; 50–60%; 60–70%; 70–80%

1996 North Carolina Superintendent of Public Instruction election
Party	Candidate	Votes	%	±%
Democratic	Michael E. Ward	1,243,423	52.00	
Republican	Vernon Robinson	1,103,288	46.14	
Libertarian	Chris Spruyt	26,431	1.11	
Natural Law	Starr Von Stade	18,036	0.75	
Turnout		2,391,178		

== State Treasurer ==
State treasurer results by county. Boyles: 40-50% 50-60% 60-70% 70-80% Duncan: 40-50% 50-60% 60-70%

1996 North Carolina State Treasurer election
Party	Candidate	Votes	%	±%
Democratic	Harlan E. Boyles (incumbent)	1,219,594	50.62	
Republican	Ann Duncan	1,144,749	47.52	
Libertarian	Lewis Hunter	31,492	1.31	
Natural Law	Peter Lyda	13,251	0.55	
Turnout		2,409,086		

== See also ==
- 1996 North Carolina gubernatorial election
- 1996 North Carolina lieutenant gubernatorial election
- 1996 North Carolina Secretary of State election
