= Ruth Dial Woods =

American educator and activist (1937–2023)

- Born: Ruth Dial; May 22, 1937; Pembroke Township, Robeson County, North Carolina
- Died: June 8, 2023 (aged 86)
- Occupations: educator, activist

Ruth Dial Woods (May 22, 1937 – June 8, 2023) was an American educator and activist. A member of the Lumbee Tribe of North Carolina, she was the first woman to serve as the associate superintendent of the Robeson County Public Schools and to receive an at-large appointment to the University of North Carolina Board of Governors. After teaching in the public school system of Robeson County for 27 years, she joined the faculty at Fayetteville State University. In addition to her work as an educator, Woods was involved in the Civil Rights Movement, the Women's liberation movement, and the American Indian Movement. She has served as a community development consultant for the United States Department of Labor and as a consultant for the Lumbee Tribal Council for administration of tribal programs. The recipient of numerous awards and honors for her work in human rights and education, in 2011, she was inducted into the North Carolina Women's Hall of Fame. Woods died on June 8, 2023, at the age of 86.

== Early life and education ==
Ruth Dial was born in 1938 in Robeson County, North Carolina to Ruby (née Carter) and A. G. Dial. She grew up living on the farm of her maternal grandparents Rosella and John Carter. Both of her parents were educators and her family heritage was Lumbee. Dial attended the Indian school in Robeson County until 1948 or 1949 and then she moved to Johnson City, Tennessee when her mother enrolled in master's classes at East Tennessee State College. At the time, Native Americans were unable to enroll in higher education institutions in North Carolina. Dial continued her studies at the training school which was affiliated with East Tennessee State. After a semester, her mother transferred to Appalachian State Teacher's College in Boone, North Carolina, and Dial attended the training school attached to Appalachian. When her mother graduated, to Robeson County and Dial graduated from Pembroke High School in 1952. That fall she began attending Meredith College in Raleigh, but after 3 years of study, left in 1955 to marry James R. Roberts in Detroit, Michigan.

== Career ==
Dial's first employment was with a temporary service in the billing department. After her husband was injured in a car accident in 1958, she began working at Ford Motor Company. As he was hospitalized in North Carolina, Dial returned there in 1959 and began teaching in the public schools of Robeson County. In 1961, she returned to Meredith College to complete her bachelor's degree in English and Spanish the following year and then resumed teaching. In 1965, she left teaching and began working on community empowerment and development programs for minorities, rural areas, and women with the U.S. Department of Labor. Around the same time, she divorced and became involved in the civil rights movement, the women's movement, and the American Indian Movement. She became a founding member of the Lumbee Regional Development Association and worked with the tribal government to create programs to meet the educational, political and socio-economic needs of

In 1972, Dial married Noah Woods and returned to teaching in the public schools. Retiring from teaching in 1977, she was a delegate to the 1977 National Women's Conference, part of the events coordinated for International Women's Year. Woods later said that serving as a delegate to the conference was one of the "defining moments" of her life. That year she began working as the Director of Indian Education for the Robeson Public Schools and as a consultant, administrating the Recruitment of Minorities for Advancement in the Profession Project (Project REAP) for Fayetteville State University and the Z. Smith Reynolds Foundation. She also worked as a program consultant to the Lumbee Tribal Council administrating tribal programs. Simultaneously, she returned to school earning a master's degree from Pembroke State University and a Doctor of Education degree from South Carolina State University in school administration, which she completed in 1989.

Woods became the first woman appointed as the associate superintendent of the Robeson County Public schools in 1982. In 1985, she became the first woman to receive an at-large appointment to the University of North Carolina Board of Governors. In 1986 she was honored with a Distinguished Woman of North Carolina Award from the North Carolina Council on the Status of Women and in 1989 received the Human Relations Award from the North Carolina Association of Educators. The following year, she was presented with the Leo Reano Memorial Award from the National Education Association for her human and civil rights leadership for American Indians.

Woods returned to school in 1991, to pursue a PhD in Curriculum and Instruction at the University of North Carolina at Chapel Hill, which she completed in 2001. After nearly a decade of service on the Board of Governors, Woods was defeated in her re-election bid in 1993. She retired in 1997 from Fayetteville State University, where she had been an associate professor, and in 1999 was reelected to the Board of Governors of UNC. That year, she was honored as one of the 100 Outstanding Alumni, selected for Meredith College's centennial celebrations. In 2011, Woods was inducted into the North Carolina Women's Hall of Fame.
