= Piedmont Wildlife Center =

North Carolinian conservation non-profit

- Type: 501(c)(3) organization - Outdoor Education
- Founded: 2003
- Headquarters: Durham, North Carolina
- Area served: Triangle Area of North Carolina
- Key people: Executive Director - Nick DiColandrea
- Website: www.piedmontwildlifecenter.org

Piedmont Wildlife Center is a 501(c)3 non-profit environmental organization located in Durham, North Carolina, United States. The center conducts programs in nature education and wildlife conservation.

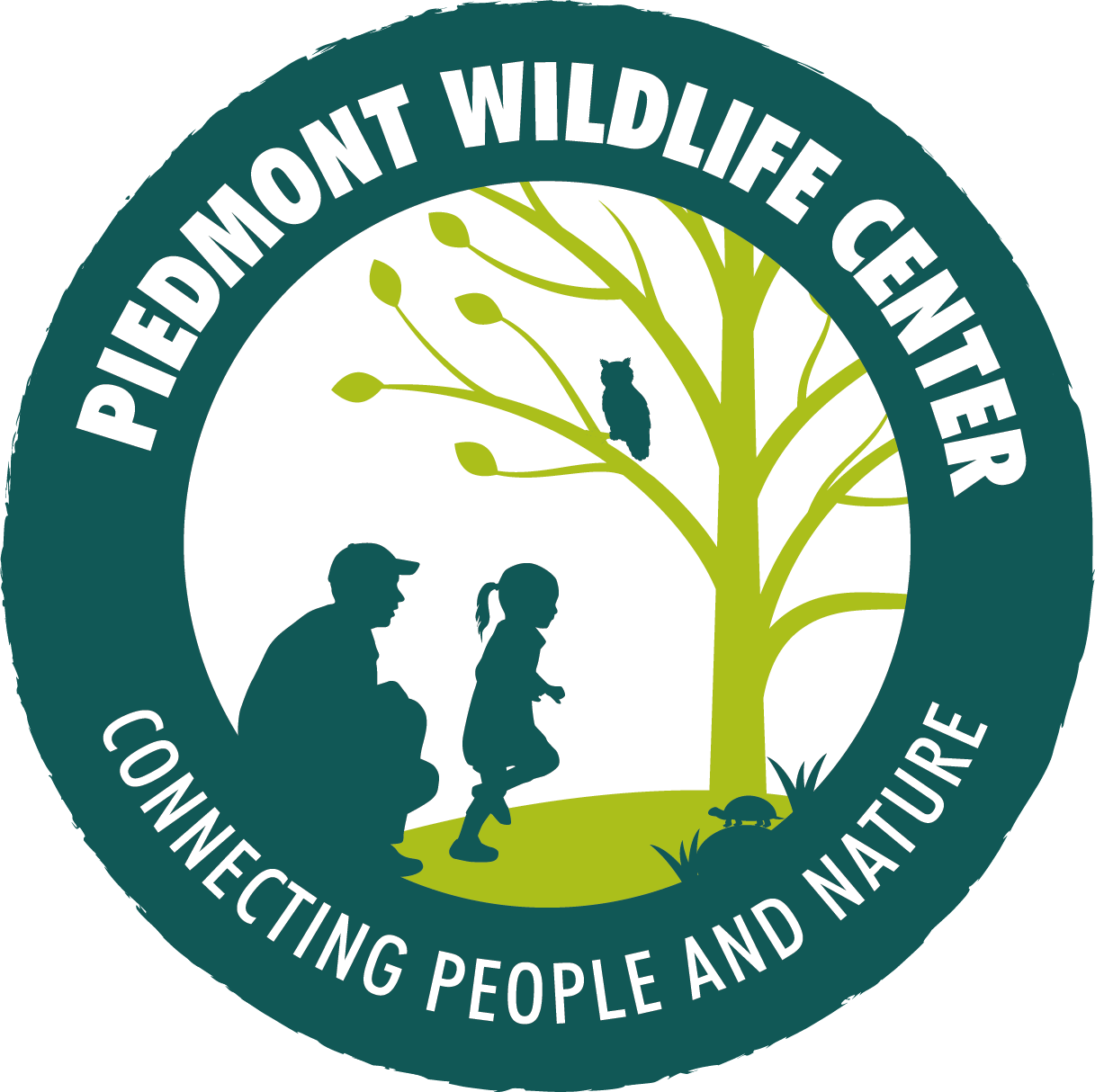

== Mission ==
Inspiring people to develop a positive lifelong connection with nature & encouraging active engagement in conservation. Piedmont Wildlife Center accomplishes this mission through a community-oriented approach to nature education, leadership development, and conservation science.

== Facility ==
The Piedmont Wildlife Center was founded in 2003, with its office located at Leigh Farm Park, an 82.8-acre city park in South Durham. The center itself is located in a log cabin at the end of Leigh Farm Road.

== Efforts ==
The Piedmont Wildlife Center's nature education programs reach adults, teens, and children in the Triangle Region of North Carolina. The programs feature hands-on experiences with a focus on primitive skills, field natural history, nature conservation, and community leadership. They are inspired by the tradition of Coyote Mentoring, established by the Eight Shields Institute. Piedmont Wildlife Center supports conservation projects with a goal of developing a greater understanding of the current state of biodiversity in the greater Piedmont area in order to conserve local species and habitats.

== Biological Inventory ==
Leigh Farm Park (home of PWC) is a critical biological buffer area that links a chain of ecosystems across the Piedmont region, maintaining a wildlife corridor across central North Carolina and beyond. The park and the surrounding North Carolina Wildlife Resources Commission (NCWRC) area include five habitat types: bottomland hardwood forest, upland hardwood forest, pine forest, forested wetlands, and fields.

Habitat fragmentation is a significant threat to wildlife. As a means of habitat protection, Piedmont Wildlife Center (PWC), associated scientists, and volunteers are currently surveying the biodiversity of Leigh Farm Park. Past survey methods have included animal tracking, the use of trail cameras, and GPS and GIS software. The goal of this ongoing inventory is to inform a more complete understanding of the current condition of diversity in the parklands—this information shapes the education and outreach programs PWC organizes in support of biodiversity in the greater Piedmont area.
