= Discovery Place Nature =

Coordinates: 35.1881°N 80.8437°W

Charlotte Museum of Nature
- Former name: Charlotte Nature Museum
- Established: 1951
- Location: 1658 Sterling Road, Charlotte, NC, United States
- Type: Children's Museum
- Website: Discovery Place Nature

Charlotte Museum of Nature, formerly Discovery Place Nature, formerly Charlotte Nature Museum, was located at 1658 Sterling Road in Charlotte, North Carolina. The Museum featured interactive nature exhibits and live animal displays, including a butterfly pavilion, live species, insects, and a variety of native North Carolina animals. The Museum offered many education programs for schools, parents and the public, and features a summer camp program. Daily programming included puppet shows and hands-on activities provide the opportunity for structured learning and informal play.

The museum was located adjacent to the 98-acre Freedom Park and the Little Sugar Creek Greenway.

The museum was closed and demolished in March of 2024 to make way for a new, modern museum.

Construction is underway at the same site for a new museum, slated to be open in 2026.

In early 2025, Discovery Place announced that the new museum will be called The Charlotte Museum of Nature.

The Charlotte Museum of Nature is part of the Discovery Place brand, an organization of museums in North Carolina that also includes Discovery Place Science, a hands-on science museum in uptown Charlotte, and Discovery Place Kids in Huntersville, NC and Rockingham, NC.
