= North Carolina Women's Hall of Fame =

The North Carolina Women's Hall of Fame is an initiative that emerged from the Governor's Conference for Women in 2009 to recognize women who have provided leadership in community service, their professions, or advocacy for women’s rights in North Carolina.

== History ==
The initiative was founded in 2009 during the annual Governor's Conference for Women. The conference, formed in 2006, to provide networking opportunities and discuss women's issues, created the initiative to annually recognize women who were North Carolina leaders as a part of the conference. The criteria for induction requires that the nominees had achieved recognition within North Carolina for community service, within their professions, or for their advocacy on women's rights and issues of concern to women.

== Inductees ==
North Carolina Women's Hall of Fame
Name	Image	Birth–Death	Year	Area of achievement
Marie Watters Colton		(1920–2018)	2009	First female Speaker Pro Tempore of the NC House
Valeria Lynch Lee		(1942–)	2009	African-American businesswoman and community leader
Sally Dalton Robinson		(1934–)	2009	Philanthropist and community volunteer
Mary Duke Biddle Trent Semans		(1920–2012)	2009	Philanthropist
Katie G. Dorsett		(1932–2020)	2010	Business leader and first African American woman to hold a NC Cabinet post
Helen Copenhaver Hanes		(1917–2013)	2010	Founder and supporter of NC arts organizations
Sandra P. Levine		(1942–)	2010	Jewish philanthropist
Betty Ray McCain		(1931–2022)	2010	Public servant and first woman named to the state’s Advisory Budget Committee
Patricia Timmons-Goodson		(1954–)	2010	First African-American woman to serve on the Supreme Court of North Carolina
Elisabeth G. Hair		(1920–2014)	2011	First woman to chair the Mecklenburg County, NC Board of County Commissioners and the first woman to chair the Board of Elections
Andrea L. Harris		(1948–2020)	2011	African-American minority business development leader
Sarah Parker		(1942–)	2011	27th Chief Justice of the North Carolina Supreme Court
Ruth Dial Woods		(1938–2023)	2011	Native American, Civil Rights and Women's right's advocate and educator
