= Helen Copenhaver Hanes =

Helen Greever Copenhaver "Copey" Hanes (October 2, 1917 – December 28, 2013) was an American promoter. She was the founder and supporter of several arts organizations across North Carolina. Hanes was a significant figure in the founding of the University of North Carolina School of the Arts. She was inducted into the North Carolina Women's Hall of Fame, and received several awards for her work.

== Biography ==
Hanes was born on October 2, 1917, in Marion, Virginia. She was the daughter of Lutheran minister, the Reverend Eldridge Copenhaver, who was the interim president of Marion College, and Margaret Greever Copenhaver. She had one sister. She went to study at Marion College for two years having resided on campus during the period her father was its president, before she travelled to Springfield, Ohio, to enroll at Wittenberg University. After she graduated from the college, Hanes went to University of North Carolina at Chapel Hill to study voice and drama; she later taught those subjects at Salem College and the city's academy. She met her future husband James Gordon Hanes Jr whom she married on August 30, 1941. They had three children, and moved to Wheeling, West Virginia, for a short period of time during World War II.

She spent her entire life as an adult dedicated to improving the reputations of the city of Winston-Salem and North Carolina. After moving to Winston-Salem, Hanes joined the Centenary United Methodist Church which she remained with for the rest of her life. Hanes assisted in establishing the Old Salem Museum and Gardens, the Winston-Salem Symphony, and the Arts Council of Winston-Salem and Forsyth County. She had been either a trustee or a board member for Salem College and Academy, the Moravian Music Foundation and the N.C. Museum of Arts located in the state capital Raleigh. Hanes was a significant figure in the establishment of the University of North Carolina School of the Arts, and along with several volunteers, helped to raise over $850,000 to allow the school to be based in Winston-Salem by making telephone calls to almost every number in the area. She donated an 1861 Civil War flag to the Historic Crab Orchard Museum in Tazewell, Virginia, and gave funds to construct a pleixglass cover that allowed the banner to be displayed.

She her husband worked to commission a sculpture of dancers for the Arts school. The pair assisted in the rebuilding of the school's sculpture studio which had been burned in a fire, and was named for the faulty emerita in the School of Design and Production Visual Arts Program Martha Dunigan. Hanes was a supporter of several agencies which included Habitat for Humanity and the Reynolda House Museum of American Art. She received an honorary degree from the University of North Carolina School of Arts in 2003, and was awarded the Giannini Society Award three years later. On November 9, 2010, she was inducted into the North Carolina Women's Hall of Fame in a ceremony held at the Raleigh Convection Center. She died on December 28, 2013, at the Kate B. Reynolds Hospice Home in Winston-Salem. On the morning of December 31, a memorial service was held at Centenary United Methodist Church in her honor.

== Legacy ==
Thomas S. Kenan III, the trustee and founder of the University of North Carolina School of the Arts described Hanes as "one of a kind" and "irreplaceable". After her death, an honor called the Helen C. Hanes Friend of Education Award was created, and is bestowed to individuals who have contributed to the field of education in an important way.
