= 1992 North Carolina lieutenant gubernatorial election =

- November 3, 1992
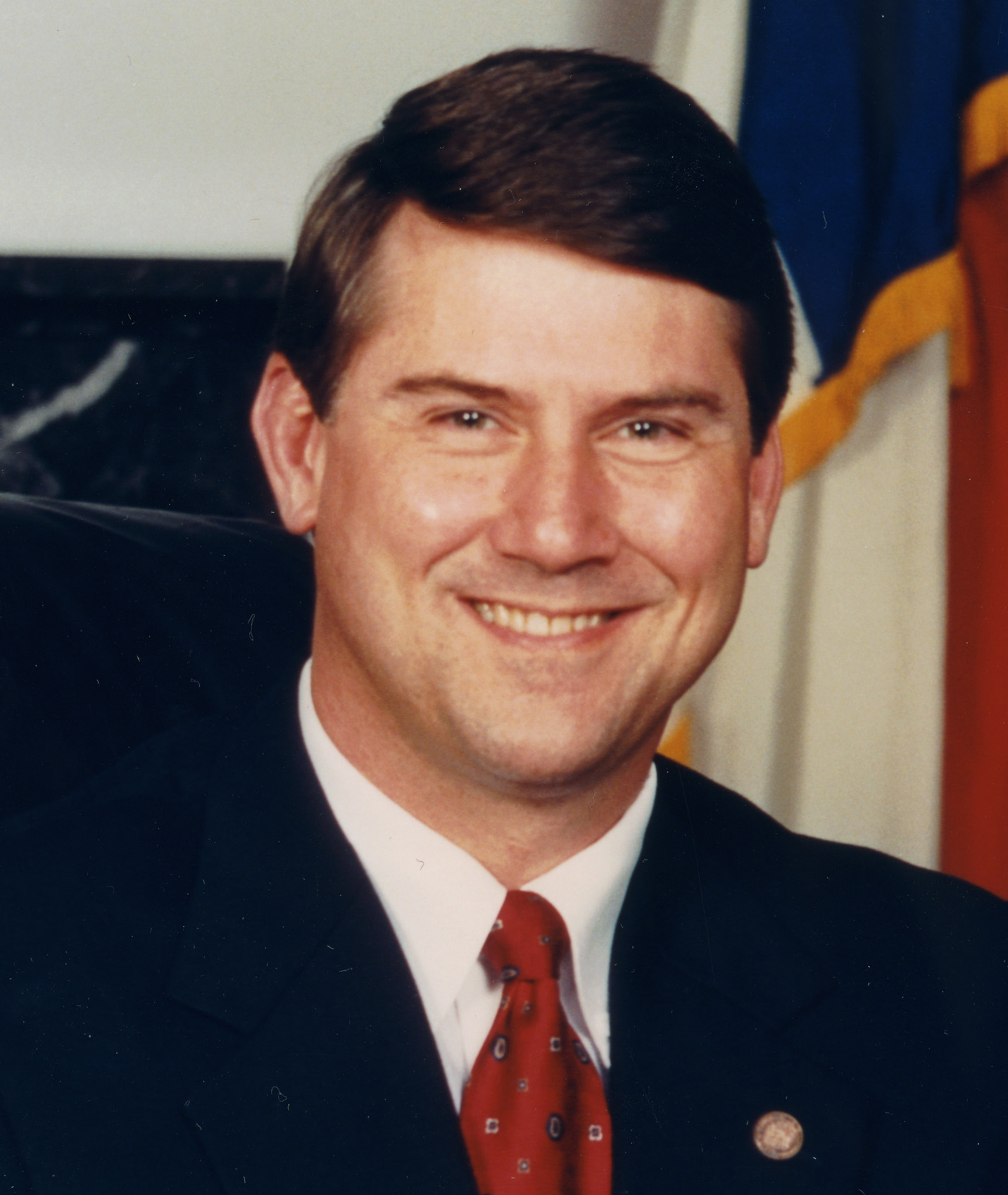

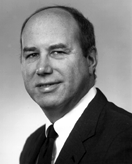
Nominee	Dennis Wicker	Art Pope
Party	Democratic	Republican
Popular vote	1,341,777	1,070,828
Percentage	53.50%	42.70%
- County results Wicker: 40–50% 50–60% 60–70% 70–80% Pope: 40–50% 50–60% 60–70%
Lieutenant Governor before election
Jim Gardner
Republican
Elected Lieutenant Governor
Dennis Wicker
Democratic

The 1992 North Carolina lieutenant gubernatorial election was held on November 3, 1992. Democratic nominee Dennis A. Wicker defeated Republican nominee Art Pope with 53.50% of the vote.

== Primary elections ==
Primary elections were held on May 5, 1992.

=== Democratic primary ===
==== Candidates ====
- Dennis A. Wicker, State Representative
- James W. Crawford Jr., State Representative
- Ed Renfrow, State Auditor of North Carolina
- C. Philip Ginn, District judge

==== Results ====
Democratic primary results
Party	Candidate	Votes	%
Democratic	Dennis A. Wicker	265,799	41.16
Democratic	James W. Crawford Jr.	234,492	36.31
Democratic	Ed Renfrow	102,207	15.83
Democratic	C. Philip Ginn	43,255	6.70
Total votes		645,753	100.00

=== Republican primary ===
==== Candidates ====
- Art Pope, State Representative
- Doris Huffman, State Representative
- Frank J. "Trip" Sizemore III, former State Representative

==== Results ====
Republican primary results
Party	Candidate	Votes	%
Republican	Art Pope	95,297	39.64
Republican	Doris Huffman	72,962	30.35
Republican	Frank J. "Trip" Sizemore III	72,142	30.01
Total votes		240,401	100.00

== General election ==
=== Candidates ===
Major party candidates

- Dennis A. Wicker, Democratic
- Art Pope, Republican

Other candidates

- Jeannette Small, Libertarian

=== Results ===
1992 North Carolina lieutenant gubernatorial election
Party	Candidate	Votes	%	±%
Democratic	Dennis A. Wicker	1,341,777	53.50%	
Republican	Art Pope	1,070,828	42.70%	
Libertarian	Jeannette Small	95,189	3.80%	
Majority		270,949		
Turnout				
Democratic gain from Republican		Swing		
