= Michael Marsicano =

American businessperson (born 1956)

Michael Marsicano (born 1956) serves on the boards of the John S. and James L. Knight Foundation and the Leon Levine Foundation. He is the former president and CEO of Foundation for the Carolinas, retiring in January 2022. In 2017, Marsicano was named No. 1 on the list of 50 Most Powerful People in Charlotte by Charlotte Magazine.

== Biography ==
Marsicano received his Bachelor of Science, Masters of Education and Doctor of Philosophy from Duke University. He served as Executive Director of the Durham Arts Council in Durham, North Carolina, from 1982-1989. In 1989, he left to oversee the Arts & Science Council in Charlotte. While at its head, the united arts fund became the nation's highest in per capita annual giving, and the Arts & Science Council became one of the largest endowed arts councils in the United States.

In 1996, with Marsicano at head of ASC, controversy erupted around a Charlotte Repertory Theatre production of the Pulitzer Prize-winning play Angels in America. Local evangelical leaders protested the themes of the play and the onstage nudity, citing public funding via the Arts & Science Council as the core of its argument. Marsicano stood by ASC’s decision to fund, and the Mecklenburg County Commission responded by removing $2.5 million in funding to ASC. After four of the five commissioners who voted to strip the Arts and Science Council of its resources lost their seats in the next election, funds were restored and increased.

In 1999, Marsicano was tapped to lead Foundation for the Carolinas, only the third head of the organization in its 60 years. During his tenure, FFTC has grown from assets of $240 million to more than $2.5 billion in 2017, and approximately $4 Billion by his retirement in 2023. FFTC grew from the 35th largest community foundation in America to sixth largest. Marsicano has helped raise more than $3.5 billion in philanthropic gifts for cultural, educational and social-economic initiatives in the Mecklenburg County region. He serves on the boards of Duke University, Duke University Health System, Charlotte Chamber of Commerce and Charlotte Center City Partners. Marsicano has chaired the boards of the University of North Carolina School of the Arts, the National Assembly of Local Arts Agencies (now Americans for the Arts) and guest panels at the National Endowment for the Arts.

== Awards ==
Marsicano received the Vision Award from Charlotte Center City Partners in 2016, the Arc of Triumph Award from Johnson C. Smith University in 2011, the distinguished service award from the University of North Carolina – Charlotte in 2010, was named Innovator of the Year in 2008 by the Charlotte Chamber of Commerce and won the Philanthropy Campeon Award in 2005 from the Latin American Coalition. In 2018, Marsicano was named to the NonProfit Times’ 21st -annual Power and Influence Top 50 List, highlighting the nation’s top philanthropic leaders. In 2022, he won the Citizen of the Carolinas award from the Charlotte Regional Business Alliance, the Distinguished Alumni Award from Duke University and was inducted into the Order of the Long Leaf Pine, North Carolina’s highest civilian honor.

== Personal ==
Michael is married to Leslie Marsicano, the Director of the Preyer Scholars Program at Queens University of Charlotte. They have three children. On March 5, 2023, one of his children, Jamie, was arrested at the site of a music festival connected to the Stop Cop City campaign.
