= Foundation for the Carolinas =

American charity organization

Foundation For The Carolinas
- Location: Charlotte, NC
- Region served: 13-county region in North and South Carolina: Cabarrus, NC; Cherokee, SC; Cleveland, NC; Iredell, NC; Lancaster, SC; Lexington, C; Lincoln, NC; Mecklenburg, NC; Richmond, NC; Salisbury, NC; Stanly, NC; Union, NC; York, SC
- Key people: Michael Marsicano (President CEO)
- Website: www.fftc.org

The Foundation for the Carolinas is a donor-advised charity with a non-exclusive focus on North Carolina and South Carolina.

== Overview ==
Established in 1958, Foundation For The Carolinas (FFTC) is a community foundation based in Charlotte, North Carolina, with a non-exclusive focus on North and South Carolina. FFTC’s stated mission is to inspire philanthropy and empower individuals to create a better community.

FFTC is one of the largest community foundations in the US with more than $2.7 billion in charitable assets across nearly 3,000 philanthropic funds established by families, nonprofits, and businesses.

Foundation For The Carolina supports personal and corporate philanthropy through a range of fund and giving options. FFTC also offers nonprofits expert guidance and a wide array of services, including endowment management, designed to increase a nonprofit’s impact in the community it serves.

FFTC is led by president and CEO Michael Marsicano, named Charlotte Magazine’s “Most Powerful Person in Charlotte” in 2017.

== Contributions, grants, and assets ==
=== 2019 contributions, grants, and assets ===
- Total contributions to funds: $296 million
- Total grants to nonprofits: $336 million
- Total assets owned and represented by FFTC: $2.8 billion

== Robinson Center for Civic Leadership ==
The Robinson Center for Civic Leadership is the flagship program of Foundation for the Carolinas, convening leaders and funding to address key community-wide challenges and opportunities, such as improving public education, preserving green space, and boosting economic mobility.

=== Civic initiatives ===
Foundation For The Carolinas has launched a number of key programs, initiatives, and investments, including:

A Way Home: This $20 million endowment is a public-private initiative addressing family homelessness in the community.

Carolina Thread Trail: A regional trail network that reaches 15 counties and more than 2.3 million people.

Charlotte Housing Opportunity Investment Fund: More than $50 million was raised for this fund that aims to increase access to affordable housing.

Leading on Opportunity: Public/private partnership formed to address the issues around economic opportunity in the region.

North Tryon Vision Plan: A cohesive strategy to catalyze and guide the revitalization of the North Tryon area of Uptown Charlotte.

Project L.I.F.T.: Initiative focused on West Charlotte High School and its feeder schools, which set a goal to increase the West Charlotte graduation rate over five years.

Read Charlotte: A collaborative, community-wide movement to double the percentage of third-grade students reading at grade level from 40% (as of 2020) to 80% in 2025.

Veterans Bridge Home: Program helps returning veterans and their families successfully transition from the military to the civilian sector in Charlotte- Mecklenburg in response to a rapidly growing veteran population.

COVID-19 Response Fund: To address COVID-19’s impact on the community, FFTC and United Way of Central Carolina launched the COVID-19 Response Fund, a grantmaking program designed to assist local nonprofits in aiding those affected by the pandemic. The fund raised more than $20 million, distributing grants to more than 200 nonprofits helping deliver basic needs such as childcare, education, housing, food, emergency financial assistance, health and mental health, and more.

== Grant distribution ==
Foundation For The Carolina distributes grants from charitable funds held at FFTC with the goal to make a positive difference in the greater Charlotte region and nationally. The majority of distributed grants benefit designated organizations for which the funds are established or directed by individual donors.

FFTC also manages several grant programs whereby boards and committees make grant awards through competitive grant cycles.

In 2019, FFTC-held funds distributed more than 20,000 grants for a total of $336 million, with donors contributing $298 million to funds held by FFTC.

== History ==
=== Early history (1958–2001) ===
1958: The United Community Foundation is created with the mission to accept and distribute charitable gifts, to steward donors’ wishes in perpetuity, and to build a permanent “nest egg” for the broad community needs of Charlotte and Mecklenburg County.

1978: Foundation opens its own office. Gordon Berg, Barbara Hautau, and Judy Kerns leave the United Way to staff the Foundation.

1993: Under the leadership of several African-American members of the Board, FFTC creates a new African American Community Endowment Fund.

1995: The Foundation receives the largest single gift in its history – $35 million from the estate of longtime supporter, Lucille Puette Giles.

1999: William Spencer retires after leading the Foundation for 13 years. Michael Marsicano, who served as president/CEO of Charlotte-Mecklenburg’s Arts & Science Council, is chosen to lead the Foundation.

=== 2001–present ===
2007: Foundation For The Carolinas makes a large discretionary gift of $2 million to the Carolina Thread Trail, a 15-county greenway network.

2008: The Foundation launches the Critical Need Response Fund in partnership with the Leon Levine Foundation, the Charlotte Chamber of Commerce, the United Way of Central Carolinas, and Mecklenburg Ministries. The fund provides grants designated to shelter, feed and clothe individuals in need.

2011: The Luski-Gorelick Center for Philanthropy opens as the new headquarters of Foundation For The Carolinas at 220 North Tryon Street.

2012: The Foundation reaches $1 billion in total assets owned and represented.

2016: FFTC surpasses the $2 billion mark in charitable assets.

2016: An FFTC-backed initiative, the North Tryon Vision Plan, is formally adopted by the local Charlotte government.

2017: The FFTC-backed Opportunity Task Force releases the Leading on Opportunity report detailing findings and upward mobility study recommendations.

2017: Due to a devastating string of natural disasters – Hurricanes Harvey, Irma, Maria and Nate, as well as the Santa Rosa, Calif., wildfires – FFTC's subsidiary E4E Relief grants more than $13.1 million in relief.

2018: In preparation for Hurricane Florence hitting the NC coast in September of that year, FFTC creates the Hurricane Florence Response Fund with funding assistance from Michael Jordan, Stephen Colbert and Walmart. Initial grants are issued in December to 20 organizations supporting hurricane-related rebuilding and recovery efforts.

2019: The Foundation's campaign to raise $50 million from the private sector is realized in summer with a $6 million commitment from Novant Health.

2019: The Foundation raises $6.2 million from the private sector to support Mecklenburg County’s MECK Pre-K initiative, which aims to provide universal pre-k education by FY24.

2020: In response to COVID-19’s impact on the community, FFTC launches the COVID-19 Response Fund on March 16 to aid those most affected by the pandemic. An initial gift of $1 million from LendingTree and a $1 million matching gift from the City of Charlotte supports the launch of the fund.

2020: FFTC partners with the City of Charlotte to support its Open for Business Initiative to distribute $30 million in federal CARES Act funding to small businesses headquartered within the city limits of Charlotte. The grantmaking program was followed by a similar initiatives to grant $4 million to local bars and restaurants, $6 million to local hotels and $6 million to support local artists.

== 220 North Tryon ==
Also known as the Luski-Gorelick Center for Philanthropy, Foundation For The Carolinas is headquartered at 220 North Tryon Street in uptown Charlotte. The location serves as the central office for FFTC staff, while also providing meeting and conference space to area philanthropic organizations. The headquarters is located within the Belk Place civic campus, also home to the historic Carolina Theatre, currently under renovation.

The Sonia and Issac Luski Gallery is located on the first floor of 2020 North Tryon. This art gallery features contemporary collections from glass artists such as Lino Tagliapietra, Jon Kuhn and Dale Chihuly, as well as painters such as Chuck Close and Herb Jackson. The gallery is open to the public Monday through Friday, 9am to 5pm. There is no admission fee.

== Publications ==
FFTC publishes the following public reports and periodicals. They are available free of charge Interested parties can subscribe to receive these periodicals by email or traditional mail.

- Charitable Giving Guide: Helps readers better understand the various options for charitable giving available through the FFTC.
- Quarterly Newsletters: Provides subscribers with a quarterly recap of key events, actions, and impact stories within the last three months.
- Annual Reports: A comprehensive report on FFTC’s activities, impact, and financial performance during the preceding year.
- News Releases: FFTC publishes news releases on a regular basis. These releases are available on their website.

== Critical response ==
The foundation has supported many projects in Charlotte, the city where it is headquartered. It has funded local non-profits that provide services for refugees and asylum seekers. The foundation has also given millions of dollars to anti-immigration groups such as NumbersUSA, the Federation for American Immigration Reform, and the Center for Immigration Studies. This has been the focus of criticism from local and national groups. America’s Voice, a pro-immigration group, has asked the foundation to stop funding such groups. The foundation's president and CEO, Michael Marsicano, has defended his group's actions in terms of free speech. He asked: "Philanthropy is a form of freedom of speech, and I don’t think any institution should be cutting off freedom of speech on fund-holders. If we did, where would it stop?"

The bulk of the foundation's donations are made at the direction of donors who may choose to support any IRS-qualified non-profit organization they wish. The Charlotte Observer conducted a review of the ten largest community foundations in the United States and found that the Foundation for the Carolinas was the only one that supported nativist and anti-immigration causes. The foundation is not a unified fund. It is actually a collection of funds worth about $2.6 billion as of late 2019. The foundation helps philanthropists and non-profit organizations with the investment and administration of their assets for a fee.

== See also ==
- Carolina Theatre (Charlotte)
- Michael Marsicano
