= Little Sugar Creek Greenway =

Park and stream restoration project

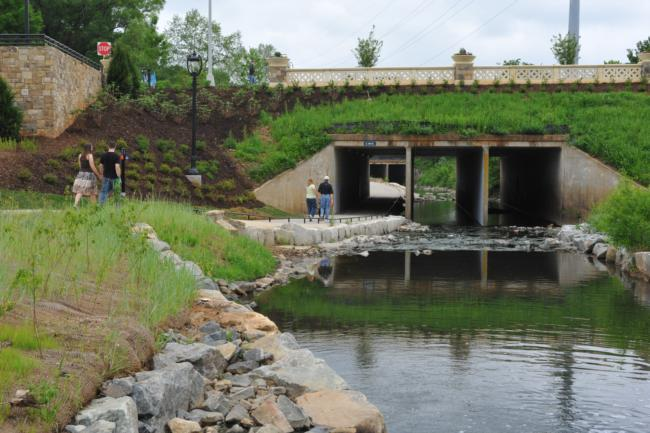
- Looking south at E 4th Street overpass
- Interactive map of Little Sugar Creek Greenway
- Type: Greenway
- Location: Charlotte, North Carolina
- Coordinates: 35.2075°N 80.8365°W
- Operator: Mecklenburg County Parks and Recreation
- Website: Mecklenburg County Parks and Recreation Greenways

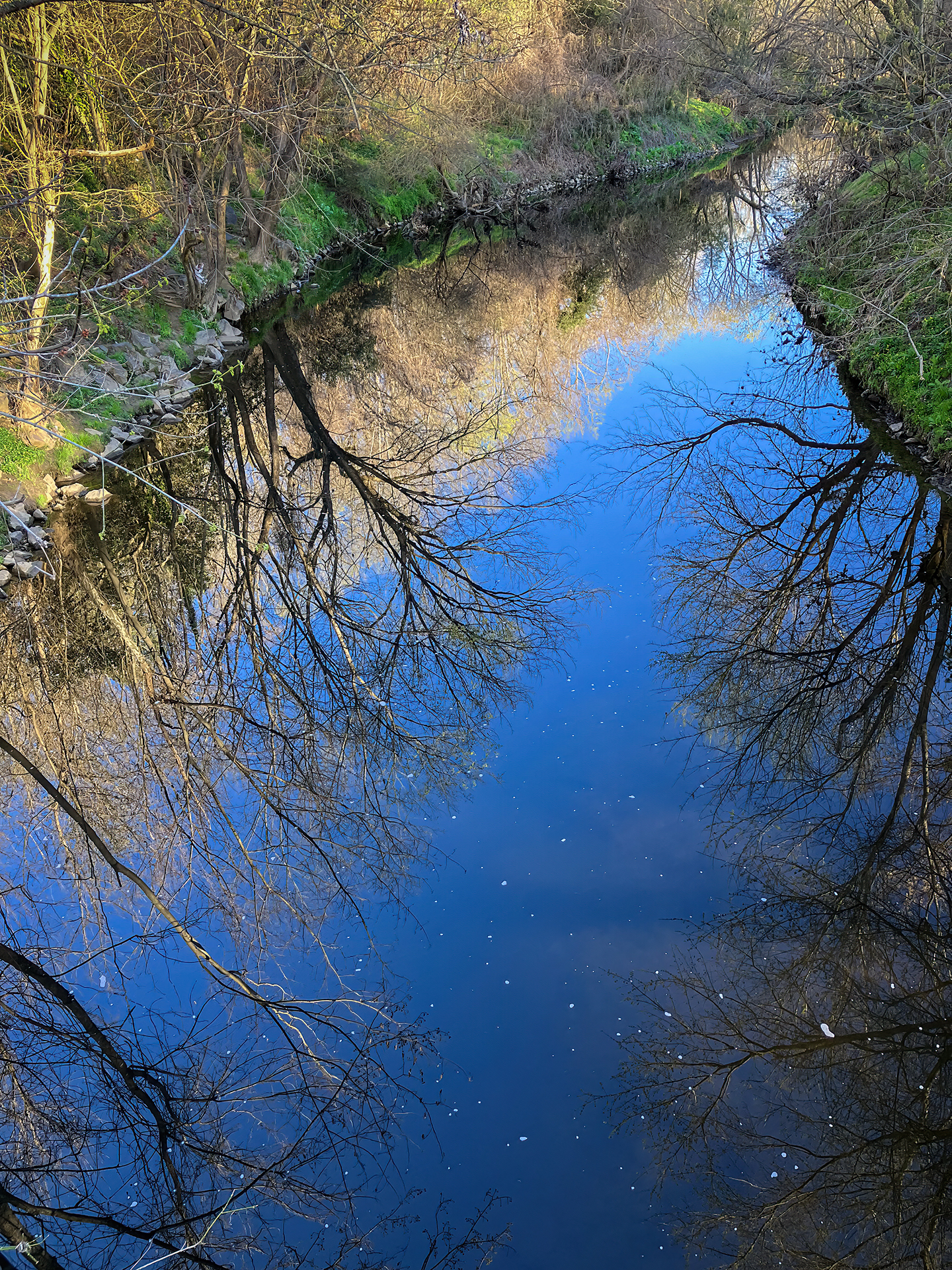
A view of the Little Sugar Creek from the Huntingtown Farms Park bridge. March 2026

Little Sugar Creek Greenway is a linear park and stream restoration project in Mecklenburg County, North Carolina. When completed it will consist of twenty miles of trails and paved walkways running from Cordelia Park just north of uptown Charlotte, then south through midtown Charlotte, and continuing all the way to the South Carolina state line. The Little Sugar Creek Greenway is a key part of the Cross Charlotte Trail (XCLT) and a segment in the Carolina Thread Trail, a region wide network of trails that pass through 15 counties.

The creek has had many issues with water quality. Impacts from urbanization on its watershed and floodplain have remained prevalent throughout the construction of the greenway and Charlotte's continued urbanization.

Greenways are narrow strips of land, planted and managed to provide both human recreation and wildlife habitat. Greenways along streams, such as Little Sugar Creek, improve water quality and help control flooding. As of April 2026, there are 85.5 miles of developed greenways in Mecklenburg County, and the Little Sugar Creek Greenway makes up over 17 of those miles.

The two urban sections of the Little Sugar Creek Greenway were championed by Central Piedmont Community College president Tony Zeiss and together provide five unbroken miles of paved walkway from East 7th Street southward to Brandywine Road.

== History ==
=== Little Sugar Creek ===
Unlike many large cities, Charlotte is not sited on or near a sea, lake, or significant river; its hydrogeography is based on small streams and creeks, Little Sugar Creek being perhaps the most prominent. The name of Little Sugar Creek (which has also been called Sugar Creek, a name that has also been applied to what is now called Irwin Creek) derives from the Sugaree tribe indigenous to the area.

Running through some of Charlotte's oldest neighborhoods, over time parts of Little Sugar Creek became hidden by houses, factories, parking lots, riprap, highways, and culverts. The stream also became very polluted by runoff from factories and sewers, and litter.

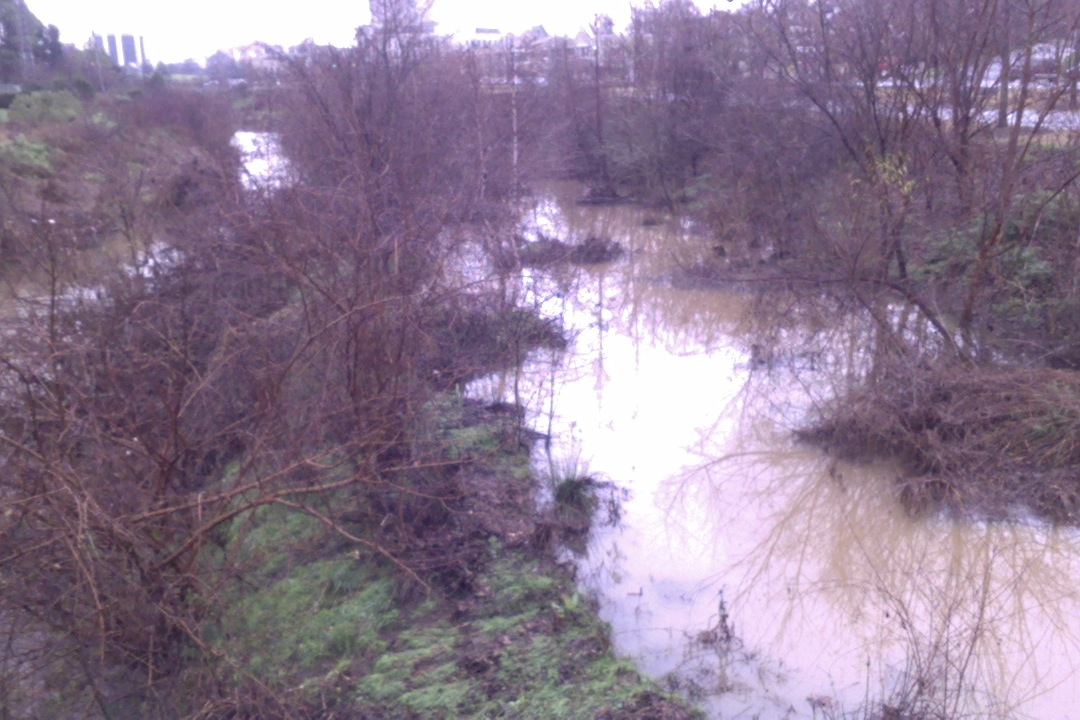
Controlled flooding on Little Sugar Creek in December 2015. In the 1990s floods caused extensive damage along the Sugar Creek watershed.

As recently as 2000, Little Sugar Creek was "the most polluted stream in Charlotte-Mecklenburg, a fetid stew of runoff and industrial waste trickling beneath parking decks and buildings on the fringe of downtown." Businesses dumped waste straight into its water, the fumes so noxious they were said to peel the paint off nearby buildings. Moreover, flood-prone buildings had to be razed, and much of the stream was covered by concrete which had to be removed. The pollution problem began to be solved when straight-piping of wastes was outlawed in 1998; nevertheless, Little Sugar Creek Greenway became the most expensive stream restoration in Mecklenburg County.

In 1999, Charlotte initiated a buyout program on the Little Sugar Creek floodplain. 450 properties have been acquired to reduce flood risk. There was a history of reshaping and modifying the creek known as straightening and dredging, which the buyout program hoped to remedy.

Within the flood-risk zone, expensive homes are still able to be built. Special flood-mitigating modifications like higher foundations are only available to wealthier builders, creating a wealth disparity in the neighborhoods around the floodplain.

Even with Charlotte’s population more than doubling from 427,000 in 1990 to 898,000 in 2022, Charlotte has been using proactive planning instruments such as zoning restrictions and surface water buffer policies to reduce ecological degradation.

=== The Greenway ===
In 1968 Charlotte city council member Jerry Tuttle, inspired by San Antonio's River Walk, proposed an urban "Charlotte waterfront" on Sugar Creek. In 1974 the Mecklenburg County Park and Recreation Commission first studied the feasibility of a greenway system. A master plan was created in 1980 involving 20 creeks and streams. The final report was based on the graduate thesis for Joan Sigmon, a geography major at the University of North Carolina at Charlotte. The idea of a comprehensive greenway system was also promoted by Mecklenburg county commissioner Tom Ray who authored the concept known as "Sugar Creek Projection 70".

Demographics provided further impetus for preserving green space in the center city. Bucking the general trend, Charlotte experienced growth in the central core while other cities were losing population to the suburbs. As a result, "The Mecklenburg County Parks and Recreation Department embarked on an ambitious update to its earlier 1980 and 1991 Greenways Plans to not only extend and create new greenway corridors, but also improve established corridors."

Finally, in 1999 a bond plan was approved; the money was used to buy property along the stream bed, begin construction or paved walkways, restore wetlands, build water gardens, and generally launch a major stream restoration project. In the end, the urban section of the Little Sugar Creek Greenway cost $43 million.

Although the master plan remained the guideline, little was done until 2000 when a 10-year growth plan was formulated.

The North Carolina Department of Transportation announced the completion of the Charlotte portion of the Little Sugar Creek Greenway at a celebration on April 24, 2012.

== Hydrology and water quality ==
The Little Sugar Creek basin is about 30% covered by medium- or high-intensity urban development. The water balance showed that roughly 45% of the rainfall is lost to evapotranspiration, 15% goes into recharging the aquifer, and 40% becomes runoff. 75% of the runoff becomes fast runoff, which is water that is directly off impervious surfaces. The study also found that increasing the paving and development in the watershed decreases the evapotranspiration and aquifer recharge, which increases the fast runoff and worsens flash flooding.

Wastewater is released into Little Sugar Creek through the Sugar Creek Wastewater Treatment Plant, which is rated for 20 million gallons of discharge per day into the creek. The plant was found not to increase the amount of antibiotic-resistant bacteria levels in the creek compared to upstream.

There has been a large increase in annual maximum floods since 1960, and increased land use seems to be the predominant factor impacting this upward trend. The annual flooding in the Little Sugar Creek floodplain coincides with the rapid urbanization of Charlotte and population growth within the watershed. This nonstationarity of the floodplain creates unpredictability year-to-year and makes it difficult to have reliable floodplain protections.

== Finished sections ==
The completed parts of the Little Sugar Creek Greenway can be divided into two major sections going downstream from north to south. The longest continuous segments run from 7th Street to Brandywine Road and from Tyvola Road to President James K. Polk State Historic Site. In December 2019 construction began on the final segment connecting Brandywine Road and Tyvola Road.

=== Cordelia Park to 12th Street ===
A paved walkway follows Little Sugar Creek and extends for .95 miles from Parkwood Avenue on the southern border of Cordelia Park to Greenway Crescent Lane and East 12th street just south of Alexander Street Park. Gulf Coast spiny softshell turtles can be seen in this part of the creek. An overland route that follows 10th street to North McDowell street to 7th street provides connectivity to the southern part of the greenway. The overland route will be replaced by a dedicated segment.

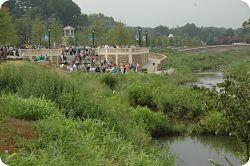
Stream restoration on urban Section of the Greenway

=== East 7th Street to Morehead Street ===
The "urban section" of the greenway runs for 1.29 miles along Sugar Creek in uptown Charlotte and was completed in April 2012. It begins at 7th Street, goes southward past Central Piedmont Community College, passes through Thompson Park, connects to the showpiece Midtown Park at Pearl Park Way, and ends at the Morehead Street underpass. It is the most highly developed section of the greenway and incorporates paved walkways, stonework walls and plazas, fountains, dining, many newly planted trees, large decorative rocks, gardens, public event areas, numerous statues and sculptures, and a clock tower. There are overpasses and underpasses to facilitate unimpeded walking and biking. Included also are the usual park amenities such as benches, bike racks, restrooms, decorative lampposts, and a snack stand.

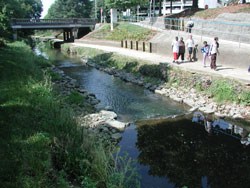
Liz Hair Nature Walk

=== Morehead Street to Brandywine Road ===
This section connects with the urban section through the Morehead Street underpass. The first part going south is a straight section directly on the banks of Sugar Creek known as the Liz Hair Nature Walk, completed in September 2005. It extends for .65 miles from Morehead Street to East Boulevard and is adjacent to the Carolinas Medical Center complex. The next section runs from East Boulevard to Princeton Avenue, passing by the Charlotte Nature Museum and through Freedom Park. Next is a so-called overland connector which utilizes existing sidewalk for .42 miles along Jameston Drive. The paved part of the greenway resumes again at Hillside Avenue and continues on to Brandywine Road, ending behind the Park Road Shopping Center. This last section features wetland filtration ponds and explanatory signage.

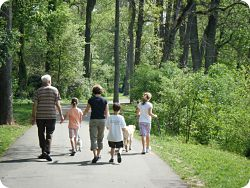
Greenway trail in Huntingtowne Farms Park

=== Tyvola Road to Huntingtowne Farms Park ===
Completed in 2018, this 1.5 mile section connects Marion Diehl Park and the Madison Park neighborhood to Park Road Park, Huntingtowne Farms Park, and the Backyard Trails network—an extensive mountain biking trail network maintained by Tarheel Trailblazers. This segment also passes by the Sugar Creek Wastewater Treatment Plant.

=== Huntingtowne Farms Park to I-485 ===
In 2020 the .79 mile segment of the greenway located in Huntingtowne Farms Park was expanded to 2.2 miles providing connectivity to I-485 and Carolina Pavilion. This expansion included access from the Park Crossing and Starmount neighborhoods. This segment of the greenway is known as a haven for hawks and barred owls.

=== I-485 to President James K. Polk State Historic Site ===
In 2021 an additional 1.8 miles of the greenway was open. This segment continued the greenway south from I-485 to the President James K. Polk State Historic Site in Pineville, North Carolina. This segment provides connectivity to Marsh Park and Carolina Place Mall. The final southern segment of The Little Sugar Creek Greenway will extend 3.3 miles from this segment at the President James K. Polk State Historic Site to the South Carolina State border.

=== President James K. Polk Historic Site to South Carolina state line ===
This greenway section runs from President James K. Polk Historic Site in Pineville NC all the way to Gilroy Dr in Indian Land SC/Regent Park Fort Mill SC area. This greenway extension provides connectivity within several communities and makes easy access to Charlotte NC/Pineville NC. This greenway also makes accessing parks and other greenways easy. This greenway not only improved the conditions of Little Sugar Creek in Pineville, it improves the lifestyle of residents within Mecklenburg County, NC and other surrounding counties such as York County, SC and Lancaster County, SC.

== Trail of History ==
The Trail of History is a collection of privately subsidized bronze statues situated in midtown (between 7th Street and Morehead Street) along the Little Sugar Creek Greenway. The statues are intended to commemorate individuals who contributed to the history of Charlotte and Mecklenburg County. In 2005 the first statue of Captain James Jack, a legendary figure in the story of the Mecklenburg Declaration of Independence, was installed in Elizabeth Park.

As of 2021, eight statues have been installed with accompanying information plaques. Additional individuals include: Thomas Spratt & King Hagler, James Buchanan Duke, Jane Wilkes, among others.

Statues include works from notable artists such as: Jane DeDecker, Ed Dwight, Chas Fagan, and Antonio Tobias Mendez.

== Reviews ==
Gene Conti of the North Carolina Department of Transportation praised the greenway "for providing Charlotteans with an accessible place to run, walk and bike," and called it "an example for the rest of the state." The Charlotte Observer called the Little Sugar Creek Greenway a "sweet resurrection". Fish have returned to the stream; and ducks, Canada geese, and herons are often seen. The mixture of natural restoration and urban redevelopment draws "gushing praise"—although some people, such as Mecklenburg County commissioner Bill James, have criticized the project for its cost. James compared the project to proposed uptown baseball stadiums, asserting that the county overpaid for land for stream restoration and helped "well-connected developers". However, one business owner said that sites along the greenway offer the "best view of Charlotte from Charlotte—a view that will remain unencumbered forever."

Despite being a vast improvement over the toxic pollution of the past, trash–particularly plastic bags-remains a problem along Sugar Creek. In 2015 Richard Maschal of the Charlotte Observer reported, "The creek is festooned with such detritus, particularly near the bridges spanning Morehead Street and Kings Drive."

== Awards ==
- 2012 Best Place to Get Back to Nature, Creative Loafing: Best of Charlotte
- 2011 Best Use of Tax Money, Creative Loafing: Best of Charlotte

== Activities ==
- Since 2011, the annual Kings Drive Art Walk has been held on the greenway between Midtown Park and Morehead Street. It features artists and craftspeople and is held in late April.
- Every Thursday evening starting in late April, MetLive presents Music on the Greenway on the nearby Metlive stage at 1224 Metropolitan Avenue.
- The popular Kings Drive Farmers Market, open from April to October, is right by the greenway at S Kings Drive and E Morehead Street.
