= Midtown Park (Charlotte, North Carolina) =

Park in North Carolina, United States

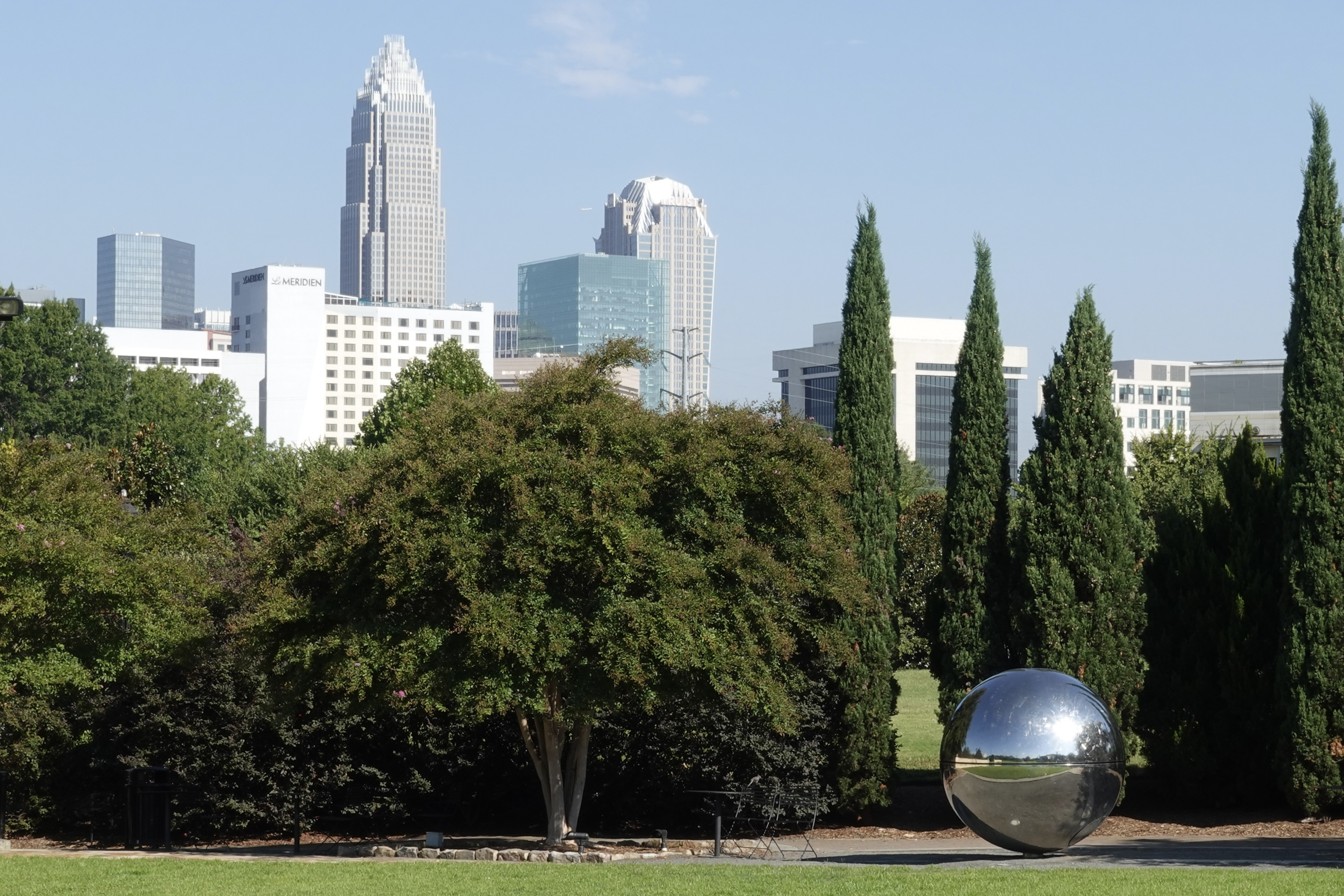
- Midtown Park with Uptown Charlotte in the background
- Interactive map of Midtown Park
- Type: Public park
- Location: Charlotte, North Carolina
- Coordinates: 35.2108°N 80.8363°W
- Area: 1 acre (0.40 ha)
- Created: 2012
- Operator: Mecklenburg County Parks and Recreation
- Website: Midtown Park

Midtown Park is a one acre minipark at South Kings Drive and Pearl Park Way in Charlotte, North Carolina. Opened in the spring of 2012, it contains stonework and shade trees surrounding a rectangular lawn and is suitable for weddings as well as performance art and other public events. The park features several sculptures, including a seven foot diameter spherical metallic piece called the Braille Music Box by artists Po Shu Wang and Louise Bertelsen. A unique feature of the sculpture is that it can be enjoyed by the sight-impaired. It contains a mechanism which can translate Braille letters into musical notes, and visitors can move the music box within the sculpture to hear this unique music.

The Little Sugar Creek Greenway runs along the western edge of the park and is connected to it by a formal stairway. According to Gwen Cook of Mecklenburg County Park and Recreation, Midtown Park "... is a showpiece along the greenway."
