= Discovery Place =

Museum in North Carolina

Discovery Place Science

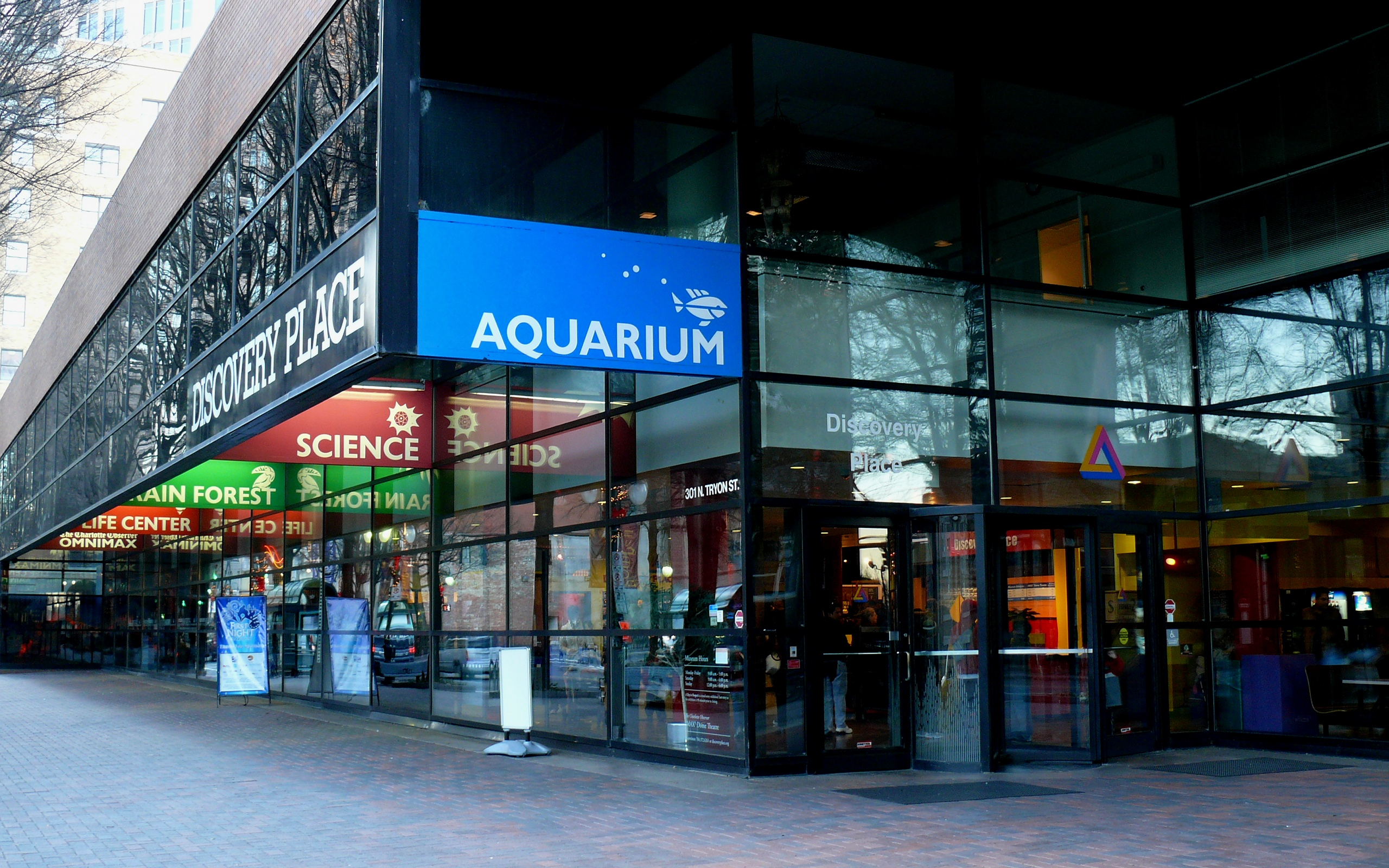
- Main entrance from Tryon Street in Uptown Charlotte
- Former name: Discovery Place
- Established: 1981
- Location: 301 N. Tryon Street; Charlotte, North Carolina; United States
- Coordinates: 35°13′46″N 80°50′27″W
- Type: Science Museum
- Visitors: 520,000 (as of 2009)
- Director: Catherine Wilson Horne
- Public transit access: Tryon Street
- Website: discoveryplace.org

Discovery Place Science is a science and technology museum, located in Uptown, Charlotte, North Carolina. Discovery Place Science operates The Charlotte Observer IMAX Dome Theater, also referred to as an OMNIMAX theater. It is the largest IMAX Dome Theater in the Carolinas.

The museum opened in 1981 and was renovated in 2010. The IMAX Dome was opened in 1991. The theater-naming rights were secured by The Charlotte Observer.

== Rebranding ==
In 2016, on the organization's 70th anniversary, the Discovery Place network of museums underwent rebranding for naming clarity. The Discovery Place moniker now refers to the 501(c)3 non-profit and network of museums as a whole. The Uptown Charlotte location: Discovery Place became Discovery Place Science. The Freedom Park location in Charlotte: Charlotte Nature Museum became Discovery Place Nature and the facilities in Huntersville, North Carolina and Rockingham, North Carolina retained their names: Discovery Place Kids-Huntersville and Discovery Place Kids-Rockingham.

== History ==
The museum traces its history to 1946, and the foundation of a small museum on Cecil Street, Charlotte, by Laura Owens, a schoolteacher. The popularity of this museum led to the foundation of the Children's Nature Center adjacent to the new Freedom Park. This museum opened in 1951, with a focus on bringing families and nature together. It further expanded in 1965 to include a planetarium. By the 1970s, it had been renamed the Charlotte Nature Museum.

At this time, interest in science education was growing, in part due to the space race between the United States and the Soviet Union. The community of Charlotte approved funding and plans for a comprehensive hands-on science and technology center, and it was decided to locate the new museum on North Tryon Street to encourage development in uptown Charlotte and maximize access in the growing city.

This new museum opened in 1981, known as Discovery Place with 72,000 square feet (6,700 m^{2}) of space. Its first director was Russell Peithman. The facility expanded as the needs of the community grew. In 1986, exhibition space was added to accommodate traveling exhibitions and, in 1991, The Charlotte Observer IMAX Dome Theatre opened as the first giant-screen motion picture theatre in the Carolinas. The Carol Grotnes Belk Education and Parking Complex was completed in 1996. In 2010, Discovery Place was significantly redeveloped, with an 18-month, $31.6 million renovation.

The museum has continued to grow with the expansion of the community, and the first Discovery Place Kids museum was opened in 2010 in Huntersville, North Carolina. Through public-private partnerships, the network continues to expand with a second Discovery Place Kids that opened in 2013 in Rockingham, North Carolina.

In 2014, Discovery Place Education Studio at Bank of America STEM Center for Career Development opened on the museum's uptown campus.

In 2016, the organization rebranded as Discovery Place, consisting of three brands: Discovery Place Science in uptown Charlotte, Discovery Place Nature in Freedom Park and Discovery Place Kids in Huntersville and Rockingham. Additionally, the organization provides professional development through the Education Studio and educational programming through its community outreach program.

== Discovery Place Nature ==
Discovery Place operates Discovery Place Nature, formerly Charlotte Nature Museum, adjacent to Freedom Park and the Little Sugar Creek Greenway. Interactive nature exhibits and live animal displays, including a butterfly pavilion, live species, insects and a variety of native North Carolina animals are subjects to learn.

== Discovery Place Kids ==
In Fall 2010, Discovery Place opened its first Discovery Place Kids Museum in Huntersville, North Carolina. As part of a larger vision to develop other Discovery Place Kids locations across the region, Discovery Place Kids-Huntersville aims to appeal to families with young children and offers those living in outlying suburban communities the opportunity to visit a Discovery Place museum closer to home. A $18.7 million public-private venture between Discovery Place, Inc. and the City of Huntersville, Discovery Place Kids-Huntersville aimed to offer unique, learning-through-play experiences for young children. Through unique public-private partnerships, the network continues to expand with a second Discovery Place Kids opened in 2013 in Rockingham, NC.

== Discovery Place Education Studio ==
Conforming to the learning needs of the Charlotte region, Discovery Place set a goal to train the region's educators to be inspired and inspiring teachers of STEM education. In 2014, Discovery Place Education Studio at Bank of America STEM Center for Career Development opened on the museum's uptown campus.
