= 1996 North Carolina lieutenant gubernatorial election =

1996 North Carolina lieutenant governor election
- November 5, 1996
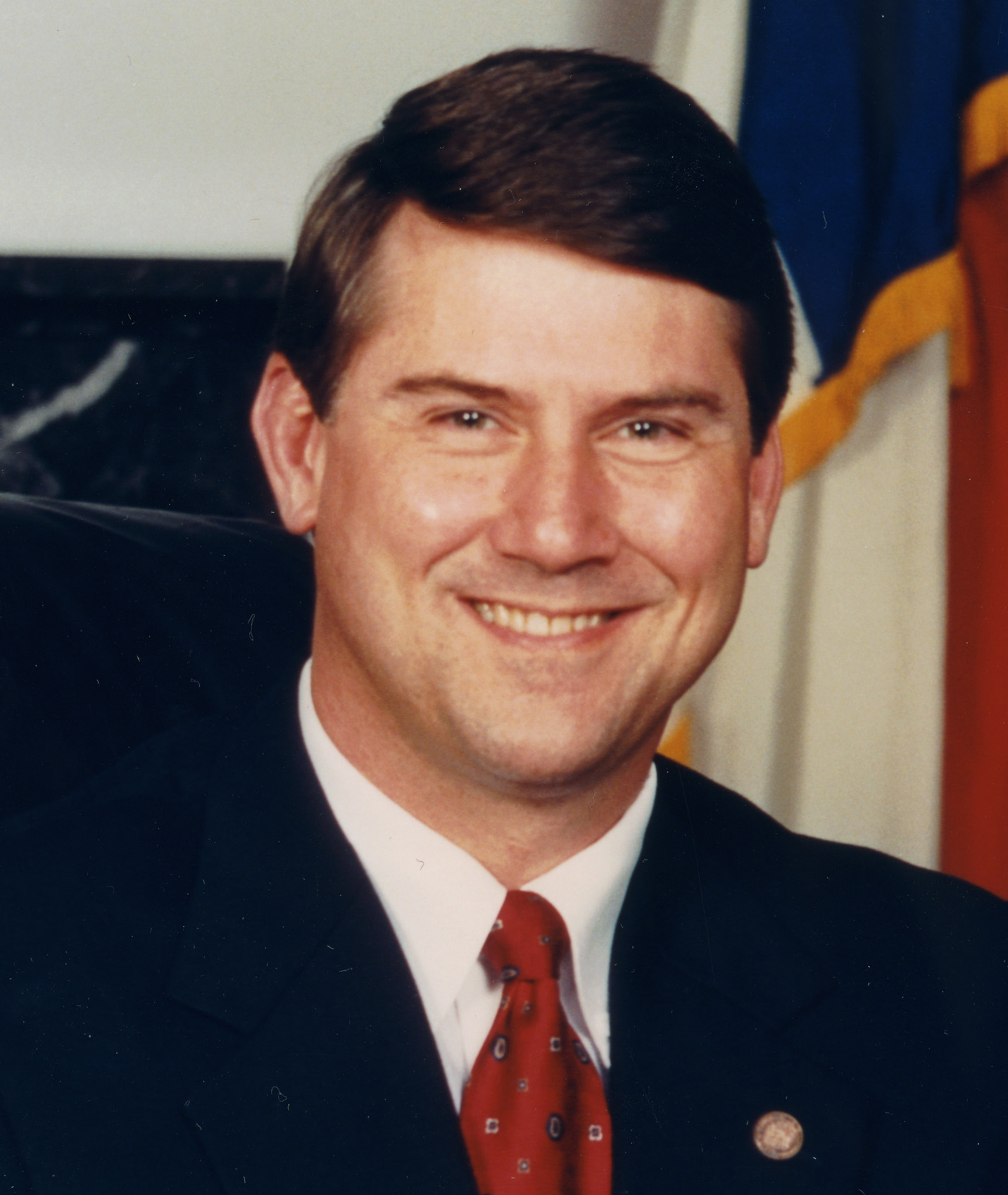

Nominee	Dennis Wicker	Steve Arnold
Party	Democratic	Republican
Popular vote	1,339,893	1,094,531
Percentage	54.5%	44.5%
- County results Wicker: 40–50% 50–60% 60–70% 70–80% 80–90% Arnold: 40–50% 50–60% 60–70%
Lieutenant Governor before election
Dennis Wicker
Democratic
Elected Lieutenant Governor
Dennis Wicker
Democratic

The 1996 North Carolina lieutenant gubernatorial election was held on 5 November 1996, as part of the elections to the Council of State. North Carolina also held a gubernatorial election on the same day, but the offices of Governor and Lieutenant Governor are elected independently.

The election was won by Democratic incumbent Dennis A. Wicker, who won a second term. In the general election, Wicker defeated Republican Steve Arnold, a Guilford County commissioner, by 55% to 45%.

== General election ==
1996 North Carolina lieutenant governor election
Party	Candidate	Votes	%	±%
Democratic	Dennis A. Wicker (incumbent)	1,500,206	54.50	
Republican	Steve Arnold	1,315,825	44.52	
Natural Law	John Dainotto	23,948	0.97	
Turnout		2,866,383		
Democratic hold		Swing		
