= Park Road Park =

Park in North Carolina, US

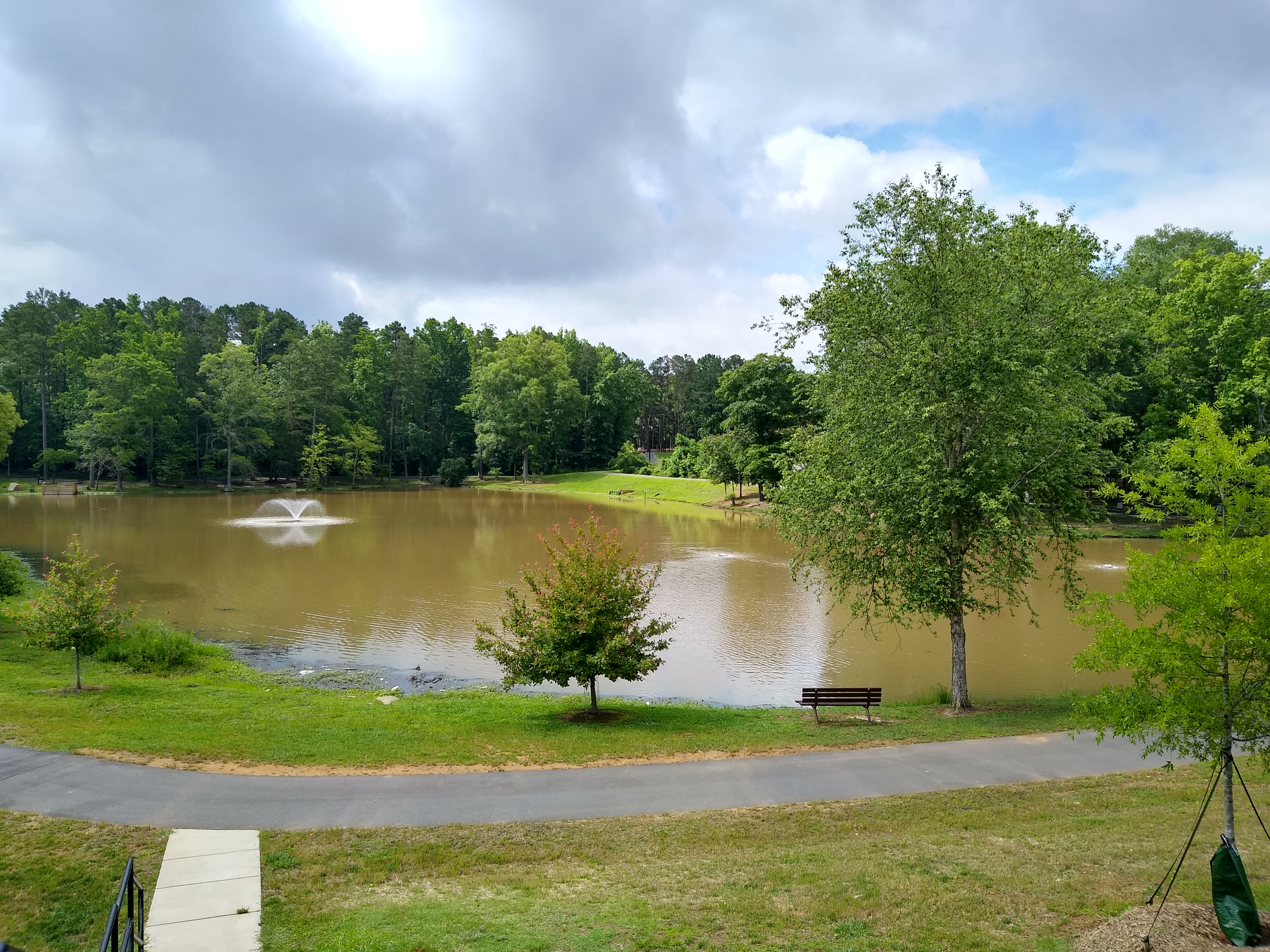
- Interactive map of Park Road Park
- Type: Public park
- Location: Charlotte, North Carolina
- Coordinates: 35.1465°N 80.8499°W
- Area: 122 acres (49 ha)
- Operator: Mecklenburg County Parks and Recreation
- Website: Park Road Park

Park Road Park is a 122-acre urban park at 6220 Park Road in the Closeburn-Glenkirk neighborhood of Charlotte, North Carolina.

Park Road Park features 8 basketball courts, 2 horseshoe pits, 6 baseball fields, 5 Picnic Shelters, volleyball courts, playgrounds, trails, tennis courts, and an eleven-acre lake. The Charlotte-Mecklenburg Parks & Recreation Department operates 36 tennis facilities and the 12 lighted tennis courts at Park Road Park are among the best in Charlotte.

The Queens University of Charlotte softball team holds all of their home games at the park. An annual children's Fall Fun Fest presented by the Charlotte Speech and Hearing Center is held each year in Park Road Park. There is a recycling drop off center at 5300 Closeburn Road inside the park.

== Beaver problem ==
Beavers have taken up residence in the central pond in Park Road Park, and this is considered a problem by Mecklenburg County's Nature Preserves and Natural Resources Division. Calling it a matter of safety and noting that the beavers are destroying vegetation on the banks of the lake that the county has worked to restore, the county is hiring wildlife control agents to trap and kill the beavers. A spokesman said, "Even though the department has a goal to keep wildlife in our parks, this was one of those situations where we really have to get rid of those beavers."

A similar conflict between wildlife and urban park management exists with the Canada geese at Charlotte's Freedom Park.
