= Russell M. Robinson II =

American lawyer (1932–2025)

Russell M. Robinson II (March 13, 1932 – September 5, 2025) was an American lawyer.

== Early life and education ==
Robinson was the son of John Mosley Robinson and the grandson of William B. Rodman, who was a justice of the North Carolina Supreme Court and the principal draftsman of the North Carolina Constitution of 1868. His uncle, William B. Rodman III, usually called William B. Rodman Jr., served as Attorney General of North Carolina.

He received his undergraduate degree, Phi Beta Kappa, from Princeton University. Robinson earned his law degree from Duke University School of Law, where he was a member of the Order of the Coif, received the Willis Smith Award, and served as editor-in-chief of the Duke Law Journal.

== Career ==
Robinson was founding partner of the Charlotte, North Carolina law firm Robinson, Bradshaw & Hinson, P.A., and author of the definitive Robinson on North Carolina Corporation Law, Permanent (7th) Edition, which is now owned by and will be maintained under the control of Duke University School of Law. He was a member of the American Law Institute and the Fourth Circuit Judicial Conference, a Fellow of the American Bar Association, and served for many years as chairman of the North Carolina Business Corporation Act Drafting Committee.

He served as president of the Mecklenburg County Bar, as a member of the board of governors and executive committee for the North Carolina Bar Association and as director of legal services of Southern Piedmont. Robinson received the Judge John J. Parker Award an award created by the North Carolina Bar Association to honor members of the North Carolina Bar who have demonstrated excellence and who have rendered distinguished services to the profession, state and nation, in 1993.

== Personal life and death ==
Robinson was married to Sally Dalton Robinson and they had three children.

He served as a trustee of The Duke Endowment From 1987, he was chairman of its Health Care and Child Care Divisions (1990–2001) and board of trustees (from 2001). He served as director and chairman of the UNC Charlotte Foundation.

Robinson died on September 5, 2025, at the age of 93.
