= Valeria Lynch Lee =

Valeria Lynch Lee (born 1942 in Halifax County, North Carolina) is an African American philanthropist and an advocate for public media in North Carolina. Lee was a co-founder of one of the first black public radio stations in the nation and has served as program director, manager, and board member for numerous organizations aimed at improving educational and socio-economic conditions for North Carolinians. She was inducted into the North Carolina Women's Hall of Fame in 2009.

== Early life ==
Valeria Lynch was born in 1942 near Hollister in Halifax County, North Carolina. She grew up on the family farm and then attended North Carolina Central University, earning a bachelor's degree in business education. Lynch went on to earn a master's in education at North Carolina State University. After completing her schooling, Lynch married Jim Lee and moved to Turkey for two years. The experience was a formative event for Lee and the first time she had not experienced overt racism.

== Career ==
In 1968, the couple returned to North Carolina and Lee began her career as a school counselor and librarian. This was a pivotal time in the Civil Rights Movement and Lee helped implement integration policies and Head Start Programs. In 1973, Lee and her husband Jim, founded a non-profit corporation, Sound and Profit United, Inc. to apply for an FCC broadcasting license. When the license was granted, the couple worked with volunteers to create the format for a radio station. By 1976, public radio station WVSP (Voices serving people) was on the air as one of the few black public radio stations. The station broadcast blues, jazz, and Latino music, as well as interviews with national figures to Warren County from a water tower erected on the Lynch family’s farm. The station became part of the activist media network in and around Raleigh during the Black Power movement and broadcast for twelve years. In 1980, Lee was appointed by Governor Jim Hunt as one of the four board trustees of the Center for Public Television at the University of North Carolina. She also earned a second master's degree in media from Ohio University's School of Radio and TV, after being selected to participate with two other women in a pilot program in 1980 which provided media management training to minorities. Before the station went off the air, the Smithsonian Institution exhibited the history of WVSP 90.9FM in Washington, D.C. That exhibit has become a traveling exhibition, which was still touring in 2010.

Lee's next endeavor was as a program officer for the Z. Smith Reynolds Foundation, selecting projects for funding which either improved or provided benefits for communities in North Carolina or preserved the cultural heritage in the state. She became a featured speaker at many events as well as a moderator for educational programs on issues of interest to the black community. From 2000-2008, she served as the first President of the Golden Leaf Foundation, as chair of the N.C. Rural Economic Development Center and as a director of BB&T. In 2009, Lee became the CEO of Applied Behavioral Concepts for Families, a philanthropic organization which distributes the funds from the national tobacco settlement toward economic development projects in North Carolina. That same year, she was named a member of the Board of Directors of BB&T, serving until her retirement in 2012. She was elected to the North Carolina Women's Hall of Fame in 2009.
