= Dennis A. Wicker =

American politician (born 1952)

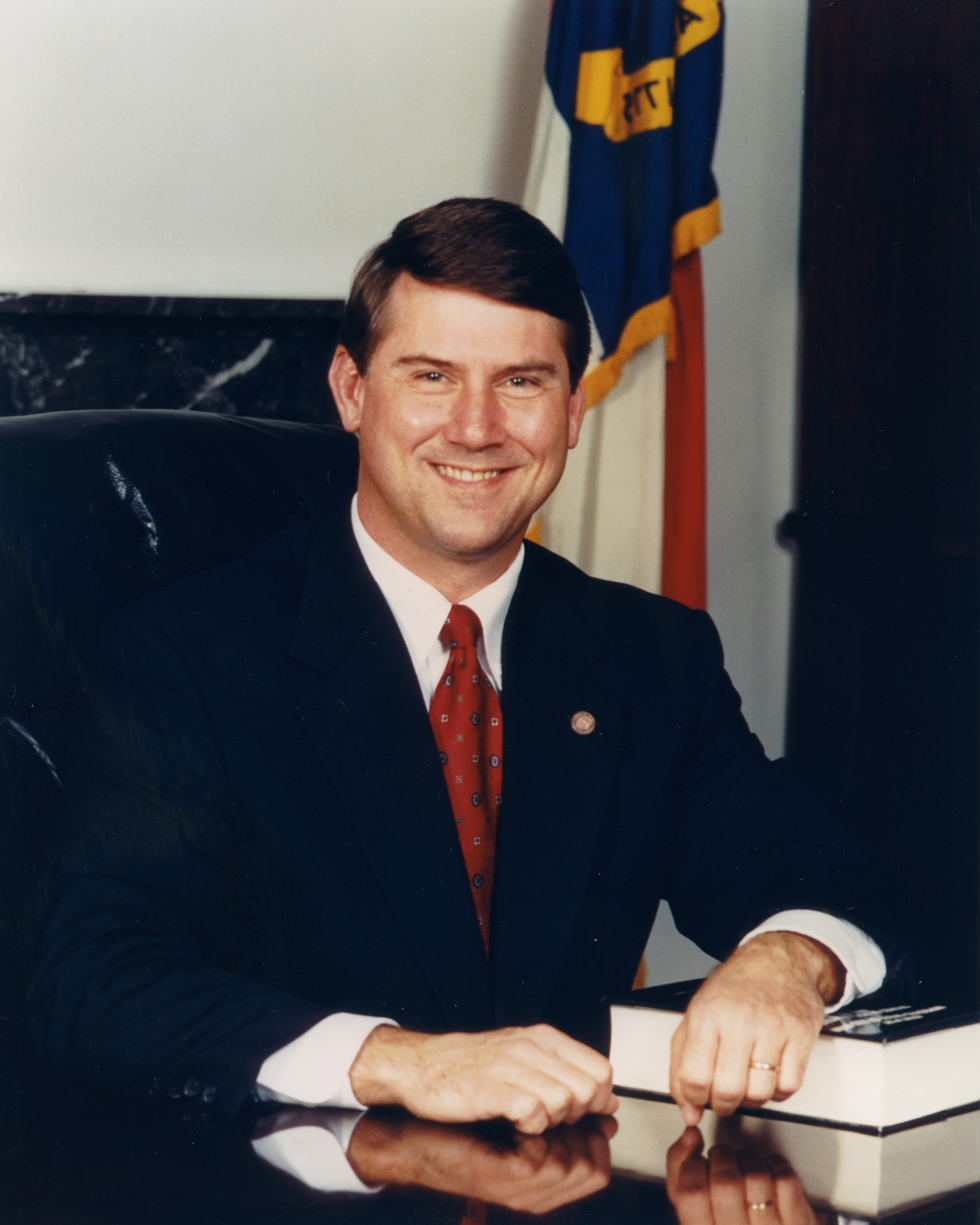

31st Lieutenant Governor of North Carolina
- In office January 9, 1993 – January 6, 2001
- Governor: Jim Hunt
- Preceded by: Jim Gardner
- Succeeded by: Bev Perdue

Member of the North Carolina House of Representatives
- In office January 1, 1981 – January 1, 1993
- Preceded by: Dela Fletcher Harris III
- Succeeded by: Bobby Ray Hall
- Constituency: 18th district (1981-1983); 19th district (1983-1993)

Personal details
- Born: June 14, 1952 (age 74) Sanford, North Carolina, U.S.
- Party: Democratic
- Spouse: Alisa O'Quinn
- Children: 3
- Education: University of North Carolina at Chapel Hill (BA); Wake Forest University (JD)
- Profession: Lawyer, politician

Dennis Alvin Wicker (born June 14, 1952) is an American lawyer and politician who served as a member of the North Carolina House of Representatives from 1981 to 1993 and as the 31st lieutenant governor of North Carolina from 1993 to 2001. As lieutenant governor, he became the first statewide elected official to chair the State Board of Community Colleges, which sets policy for the state's 58-campus system. Wicker was also a member of the North Carolina State Board of Education and the State Board of Economic Development.

He was an unsuccessful candidate for the Democratic Party's nomination for Governor of North Carolina in 2000, losing to North Carolina attorney general Mike Easley.

The Dennis A. Wicker Civic Center at Central Carolina Community College was named in his honor in 1995 because of his role in securing funding for the center.

Wicker is the leader of the Government Relations group at Nelson Mullins Riley & Scarborough, LLP. Wicker is a regular panelist on the television show NC Spin discussing various current issues in North Carolina politics.

Wicker is a founding Board member of the Lee County Education Foundation, an acclaimed public-private venture dedicated to improving the quality of public education in the Lee County public schools.

Wicker is a Shelby American collector and enthusiast.

Wicker also sits on the board of directors at Coca-Cola Consolidated and First Bank.

== Early life ==
Dennis Alvin Wicker was born on June 14, 1952, in Sanford, North Carolina, United States to J. Shelton Wicker and Clarice Burns Wicker. His father served in the North Carolina House of Representatives, and as a boy he acted as a page in the House. He was educated in Lee County public schools and played football at Sanford Central High School. He graduated from the University of North Carolina at Chapel Hill in 1974 with a bachelor's degree in economics. He graduated from the Wake Forest University School of Law in 1978. Wicker worked as an attorney at the law firm Love and Wicker from 1979 to 1992. He married Alisa O'Quinn on November 6, 1982 and had three children with her: Quinn, Jackson, and Harrison.

== Political career ==
=== Legislative career ===
Wicker served six terms in the North Carolina House of Representatives from 1981 until 1993. In 1985 Republican James G. Martin was seated as Governor of North Carolina, and Democrats in the North Carolina General Assembly attempted to weaken the powers of his office. Wicker proposed a bill to call for a referendum to amend the state constitution and eliminate gubernatorial succession, whereby a governor could serve two consecutive terms. The Assembly passed the bill by April, but after doubting the merits and popularity of a measure to remove succession, the legislators repealed Wicker's bill in 1986. In 1989 he became the Democrats' House majority leader, a position he held for the rest of his tenure in the legislature. The following year he supported Dan Blue's nomination to become Speaker of the North Carolina House of Representatives.

=== Lieutenant governor ===
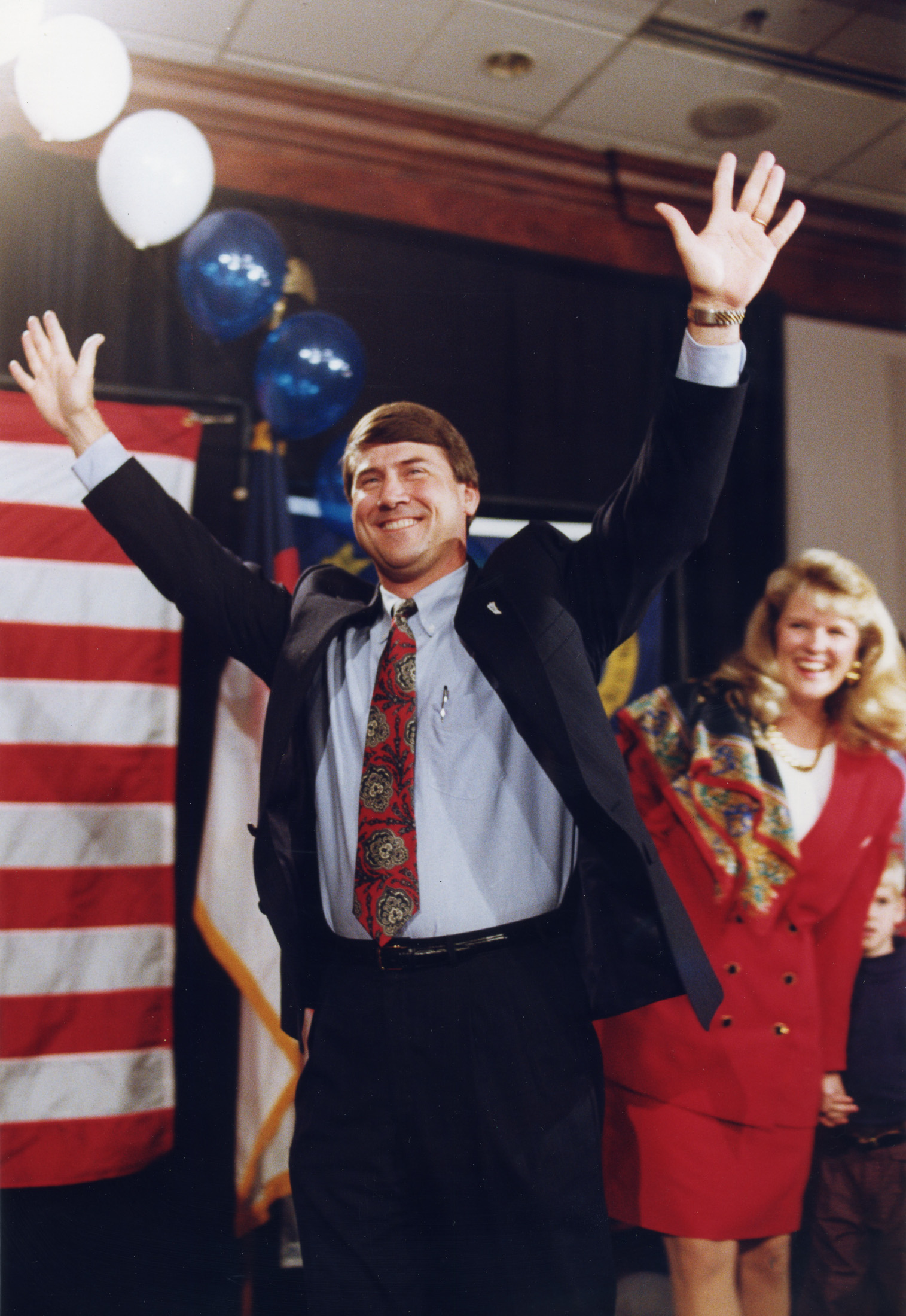
Wicker celebrating after his 1992 victory

Once he became Lieutenant Governor, Wicker kept his residence in Sanford and drove to Raleigh and back every day for work. He traveled frequently across the state for his job. He worked closely with Governor Jim Hunt and used his position to express his views to the public. Hunt allowed Wicker to keep an office in the North Carolina State Capitol.

=== 2000 gubernatorial campaign ===
In 1999 Wicker began fundraising for a campaign to secure the Democratic nomination for the 2000 North Carolina gubernatorial election. In January 2000 he officially filed his candidacy. A few weeks later Attorney General Mike Easley filed his own candidacy for the Democratic nomination. Wicker was endorsed by the N.C. Academy of Trial Lawyers, the leaders of the N.C. Association of Educators and most of North Carolina's black political organizations.

Both Wicker and Ealsey pledged to reduce the size of public school classes, eliminate hog waste lagoons, and create a state lottery. In February they differentiated themselves on hog lagoon policy; Easley indicated the attorney general's office would step up its enforcement of pollution controls and punish the owners of polluting lagoons, while Wicker criticized his actions as "too little, too late." Wicker also indicated that he would prefer to use state lottery proceeds to establish a college scholarship fund, while Easley said he would use the funds to reduce elementary school class sizes and expand pre-school education opportunities.

While Wicker had the support of many "establishment" figures in the North Carolina Democratic Party, he suffered from a drab public persona which stifled his attempt to gain the support of the public. He was defeated in the Democratic primary by Easley.

== Post-government career ==
Following his defeat in the 2000 Democratic primary, Wicker returned to private legal practice, joining Helms Mulliss Wicker, a Charlotte-based law firm. He headed its new government affairs division, which assisted companies in government interactions. He later mended his relationship with Easley, and came to approve of his performance as governor, saying in 2006, "I think the governor has done a very good job leading the state in tough times."

In 2003 Wicker was involved in a minor car accident. As a result, his doctor examined him and discovered clotting in his bloodstream, so he underwent quadruple coronary artery bypass surgery. On May 9, 2015, Wicker and his wife were driving through Montgomery County to a wedding when he experienced heart failure. He briefly became clinically dead and was taken to Troy Medical Center, where doctors managed to revive his heart. He was transferred to a different hospital in Pinehurst and remained there in a coma for a week before waking. He recovered over the following weeks.

In 2009 Wicker mulled challenging Richard Burr in the 2010 United States Senate election, but decided against it after determining that fundraising would be difficult and campaign would leave him without time to spend with his family.

Wicker later became a partner at Nelson Mullins Riley & Scarborough LLP's Raleigh office.

== Works cited ==
- Fleer, Jack (2007). Governors Speak. University Press of America. ISBN 9780761835646.
- Marcus, Lisa A., ed. (1994). North Carolina Manual 1993–1994 (PDF). Raleigh: North Carolina Secretary of State. OCLC 244121350.

Party political offices
| Preceded by Tony Rand | Democratic nominee for Lieutenant Governor of North Carolina; 1992, 1996 | Succeeded by Bev Perdue |
North Carolina House of Representatives
| Preceded by Dela Fletcher Harris III | Member of the North Carolina House of Representatives from the 18th district 1981–1983; Served alongside: Bob Etheridge | Succeeded by Rayford Donald Beard; William Edwin Clark; Henry McMillan Tyson |
| Preceded by Edd Nye; George Ronald Taylor; Ottis Richard Wright Jr. | Member of the North Carolina House of Representatives from the 19th district 1983–1993; Served alongside: Bob Etheridge, Clarence Poe Stewart | Succeeded by Bobby Ray Hall |
Political offices
| Preceded by Jim Gardner | Lieutenant Governor of North Carolina; 1993-2001 | Succeeded by Bev Perdue |
