= Freedom Park (Charlotte, North Carolina) =

Park in North Carolina, US

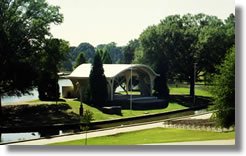
- Freedom Park Pavilion
- Interactive map of Freedom Park
- Type: Public park
- Location: Charlotte, North Carolina
- Coordinates: 35.1913°N 80.8442°W
- Area: 98 acres (40 ha; 0.153 mi^{2}; 0.40 km^{2})
- Created: 1948
- Operator: Mecklenburg County Parks and Recreation
- Website: Freedom Park

Freedom Park is a 98-acre park in Charlotte, North Carolina. Located at 1900 East Boulevard, between Charlotte's historic Dilworth and Myers Park neighborhoods, the park is centered on a 7-acre lake, and is about 3 miles (4.8 km) from Uptown Charlotte.

The park has paved trails, tennis/volleyball courts, sport/athletic fields and playground equipment. The park contains a 2-8-0 steam engine that is fenced and has safety bars added over the tender, but one can walk into the cab. In earlier years the train was open and kids could climb on top of it and under it. During that time period there were two fire engines with an old-fashioned handle crank in front for the engine. Both fire trucks had the insides and rear hose area open for kids to explore, play and learn. There used to be a F-86 Sabre jet fighter there and an army tank that kids could play on.

Free films and musical performances in the park pavilion are featured throughout the summer. Every September Freedom Park is the site of the five-day-long Festival in the Park, which annually attracts over 100,000 visitors, and has been recognized as a Top 20 Event by the Southeast Tourism Society. Adjacent to Freedom Park is the Charlotte Nature Museum, a fun and learning center for young children operated by Discovery Place, which exhibits animals and plants of the Piedmont region.

== History ==
At the end of World War II, the Mecklenburg County Lions Club raised private funds to build a park honoring veterans. They chose its name through a public contest won by Charlotte native Army Corporal Joe Gettis, who entered while stationed in Corsica. His winning submission, published in The Charlotte News, proposed calling it "The Park of Freedom, or Freedom Park, because the children will be free from want, free from fear, free from the thought of growing up to fight another war as we did." The land was deeded to the City of Charlotte in 1949.

A county bond issue resulted in a $900,000 indoor shelter building which was opened in September 2005. This shelter has a commanding view of the lake and includes a large public room, a fireplace, large screen TV, offices, a kitchen, rest rooms, and a concrete patio. It is available for rental for weddings, receptions, small sporting events, and community meetings.

In April, 2012 the North Carolina Department of Transportation announced the completion of the Charlotte portion of the Little Sugar Creek Greenway which now runs through Freedom Park and connects it with uptown Charlotte to the north and with Park Road Shopping Center to the south.

== Canada geese problem ==
A prominent feature of Freedom Park, and a favorite with some visitors, is the large number of Canada geese that congregate year round on the central lake. Charming to some, the geese are considered pests by Mecklenburg County Park and Recreation officials because of bird faeces in public areas, destruction of turf, and danger to young children. Abatement programs worked for a while, but the geese had always returned.

Since Mecklenburg County Park and Recreation contracted with Goose Busters, Inc. to provide humane goose control in December 2012 the problem has been resolved. While geese occasionally return to the park there are usually less than a dozen and they do not stick around long. The park often goes for months with no geese on site. The Park and Recreation department has eliminated the expensive clean up cost of having over 150 resident geese being on site day in and day out. In addition visitors have cleaner facilities and no longer fear attack from aggressive Canada geese.

A similar conflict between wildlife and urban park management exists with the beavers at Charlotte's Park Road Park.
