= North Carolina Wildlife Resources Commission =

- Logo of the North Carolina Wildlife Resources Commission

Agency overview
- Formed: 1947; 79 years ago
- Jurisdiction: State of North Carolina
- Headquarters: Raleigh, North Carolina
- Employees: 690+
- Annual budget: $90 million
- Website: www.ncwildlife.org

The North Carolina Wildlife Resources Commission is a state government agency created by the General Assembly in 1947 to conserve and sustain North Carolina's fish and wildlife resources through research, scientific management, wise use, and public input. The Commission is the regulatory agency responsible for the enforcement of NC fishing, hunting, trapping and boating laws.

== History ==
On January 29, 1947, bills were introduced in the North Carolina General Assembly to create a Wildlife Resources Commission. One of them was passed and made law on March 11 and effective July 1, 1947, created the Wildlife Resources Commission, transferring to it the responsibilities of the abolished Division of Game and Inland Fisheries of the Department of Conservation and Development.

== Licenses and regulations ==
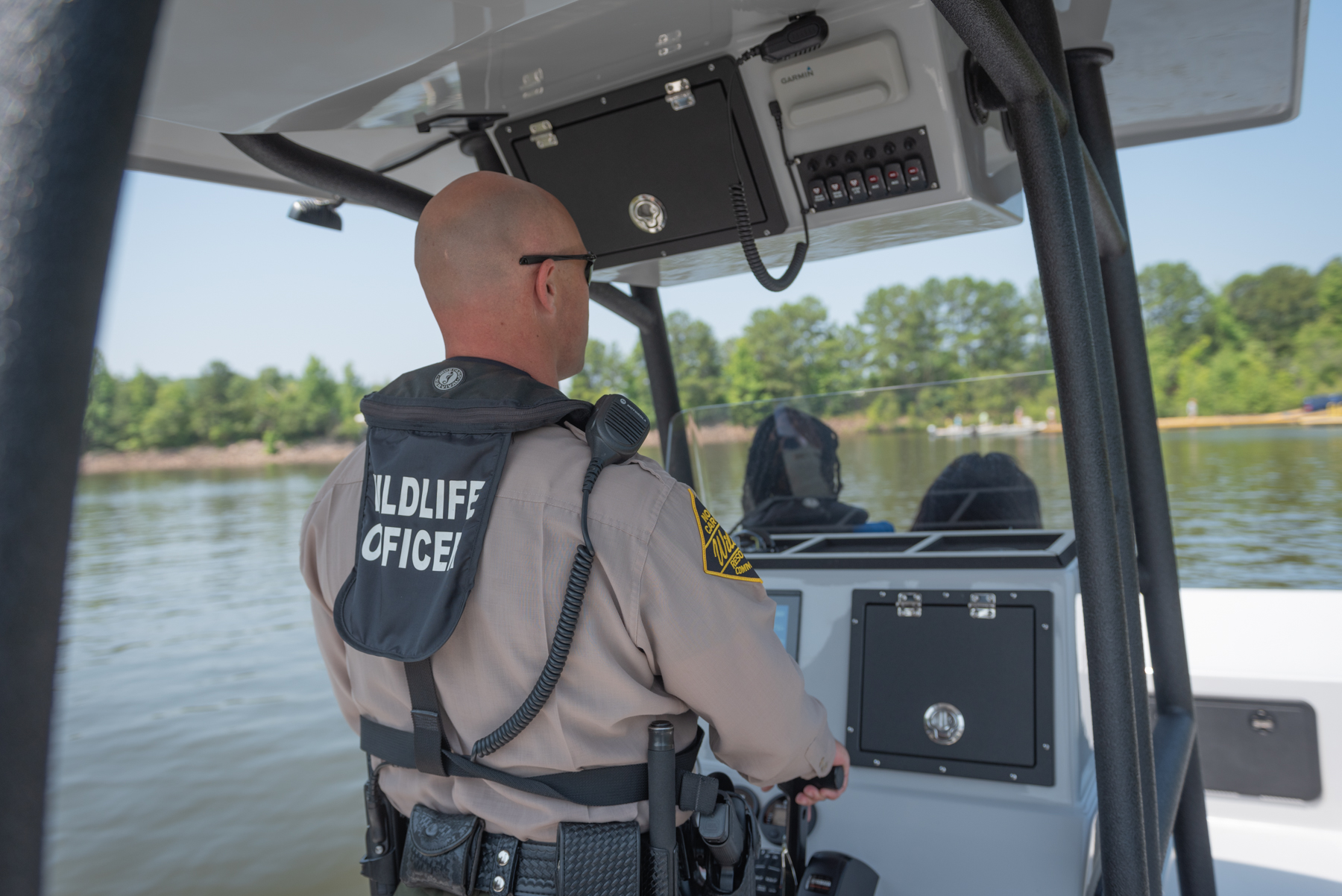
Officer of the commission's Law Enforcement Division patrolling Falls Lake in 2023

The agency issues licenses and permits for hunting, trapping, and fishing, as well as titles and registrations for boats 14 feet or longer and personal watercraft (jet skis) in the state. It employs law enforcement officers (commonly called game wardens) who enforce the rules and regulations associated with these activities. The agency also constructs public fishing areas (PFAs) and boating access areas (BAAs) that provide parking spaces for tow vehicles and trailers, and ramps and docks for launching boats into the water.

The sale of hunting and fishing licenses, federal grants and other receipts provide financial support of the agency. The Commission has an operational budget of approximately $65 million and employs over 590 full-time men and women across the state, including wildlife and fisheries biologists and technicians, wildlife officers, conservation educators, and public information, customer service, information technology, and administrative professionals. According to the state's Department of Commerce, hunting and fishing ranked 12th on the state's top industries in 2014.

== Education ==
The agency operates three Wildlife Education Centers, one each in the mountain, Piedmont, and coastal plain regions of the state. From its headquarters in Raleigh, the Commission issues a wide variety of publications, including guides for outdoor enthusiasts, maps, conservation plans, and a monthly magazine entitled Wildlife in North Carolina. The Commission also operates an online store that sells books and memorabilia associated with wildlife and conservation.

== Awards ==
Every year, the Commission recognizes those throughout North Carolina who contributed significantly to wildlife and outdoor management in the state. The Lawrence G. Diedrick Small Game Award is given to an organization or person "whose actions significantly and positively impact North Carolina's small game populations". The Thomas L. Quay Wildlife Diversity Award, named for the late activist and professor of zoology at NC State University, goes to a leader for "conservation of wildlife diversity in North Carolina". The Commission's most recent award, the Guy Bradley Award, "recognizes extraordinary individuals who have made an outstanding lifetime contribution to wildlife law enforcement, wildlife forensics or investigative techniques".

Commission staff have also received awards. The highest received is the Governor's Award of Excellence, given to employees for dedicated service beyond the call of duty.

== See also ==
- Government of North Carolina
- List of state and territorial fish and wildlife management agencies in the United States
