= List of places in California (W) =

List of places in California - W

This list of current:

- cities
- towns, unincorporated communities
- counties, and other recognized places in the U.S. state of California.

Information on the number and names of counties in which the place lies, and its lower and upper ZIP Code bounds, if applicable are also included.

Name of place	Number of counties	Principal county	Lower zip code	Upper zip code
Waddington	1	Humboldt County	95536	
Wadstrom	1	Ventura Countyf		
Wagner	1	Los Angeles County	90047	
Wagner	1	San Joaquin County		
Wagner	1	Tuolumne County		
Wagy Flats	1	Kern County	93240	
Wahtoke	1	Fresno County	93654	
Waldo Junction	1	Yuba County		
Waldon	1	Contra Costa County		
Waldorf	1	Santa Barbara County		
Waldrue Heights	1	Sonoma County		
Walerga	1	Sacramento County	95660	
Walker	1	Los Angeles County	90201	
Walker	1	Mono County	96107	
Walker	1	Siskiyou County	96050	
Walker Landing	1	Sacramento County	95690	
Wallace	1	Calaveras County	95254	
Walltown	1	Sacramento County		
Walmort	1	Sacramento County		
Walnut	1	Los Angeles County	91789	
Walnut Creek	1	Contra Costa County	94595	98
Walnut Creek West	1	Contra Costa County	94596	
Walnut Grove	1	Sacramento County	95690	
Walnut Park	1	Los Angeles County	90255	
Walsh Landing	1	Sonoma County		
Walsh Station	1	Sacramento County	95826	
Walteria	1	Los Angeles County	90503	
Walter Springs	1	Napa County		
Walthal	1	San Joaquin County		
Warm Springs	1	Alameda County	94539	
Warm Springs District	1	Alameda County		
Warner	1	San Bernardino County		
Warner Ranch	1	Riverside County	92388	
Warner Springs	1	San Diego County	92086	
Warnerville	1	Stanislaus County		
Warren	1	Kern County		
Warren Creek	1	Humboldt County		
Wasco	1	Kern County	93280	
Waseck	1	Humboldt County		
Washington	1	Los Angeles County	90011	
Washington	1	Nevada County	95986	
Washington	1	Yolo County		
Washington Manor	1	Alameda County	94579	
Waterford	1	Stanislaus County	95386	
Waterloo	1	San Joaquin County	95201	
Waterman Gardens	1	San Bernardino County		
Watson	1	Los Angeles County	90744	
Watson Junction	1	Los Angeles County		
Watsonville	1	Santa Cruz County	95076	
Watsonville Junction	1	Monterey County		
Watts	1	Los Angeles County	90002	
Watts Valley	1	Fresno County	93667	
Waukena	1	Tulare County	93282	
Wave	1	Santa Barbara County		
Waverly Park	1	Ventura County	91360	
Wawona	1	Mariposa County	95389	
Wayne	1	Santa Clara County		
Weaverville	1	Trinity County	96093	
Webster	1	Yolo County		
Webster Street	1	Alameda County	94501	
Weed	1	Siskiyou County	96094	
Weedpatch	1	Kern County	93241	
Weeds Point	1	Yuba County		
Weimar	1	Placer County	95736	
Weisel	1	Riverside County		
Weitchpec	1	Humboldt County	95546	
Welby	1	Monterey County		
Welch	1	San Joaquin County		
Weldon	1	Kern County	93283	
Weldons	1	Ventura County		
Wellington Heights	1	Los Angeles County		
Wellsona	1	San Luis Obispo County	93446	
Wendel	1	Lassen County	96136	
Wengler	1	Shasta County		
Weott	1	Humboldt County	95571	
West	1	Los Angeles County	90069	
West Acres	1	Fresno County		
West Adams	1	Los Angeles County	90016	
West Applegate	1	Placer County		
West Arcadia	1	Los Angeles County	91006	
West Athens	1	Los Angeles County	90247	
West Bishop	1	Inyo County		
West Butte	1	Colusa County		
West Butte	1	Sutter County	95953	
West Carson	1	Los Angeles County	90502	
Westchester	1	Los Angeles County	90045	
West Compton	1	Los Angeles County		
West Covina	1	Los Angeles County	91790	93
Westend	1	San Bernardino County	93562	
Western Addition	1	San Francisco County		
Western Village	1	Kern County	93501	
West Escondido	1	San Diego County		
Westfield	1	Los Angeles County	90274	
Westgate	1	Santa Clara County	95117	
Westgate	1	Ventura County	91360	
Westgate	1	Yolo County		
West Glendale	1	Los Angeles County		
West Guernewood	1	Sonoma County	95446	
West Hartley	1	Contra Costa County		
Westhaven	1	Fresno County	93245	
Westhaven	1	Humboldt County	95570	
Westhaven-Moonstone	1	Humboldt County		
West Highlands	1	San Bernardino County		
West Hills	1	Los Angeles County	91307	
West Hollywood	1	Los Angeles County	90069	
Westlake	1	San Mateo County	94015	
Westlake Village	1	Los Angeles County	91361	62
Westlake Village	1	Ventura County	91360	
West Lamont	1	Kern County		
Westley	1	Stanislaus County	95387	
West Manteca	1	San Joaquin County	95336	
West March	1	Riverside County		
West Menlo Park	1	San Mateo County	94025	
Westminster	1	Orange County	92683	85
West Modesto	1	Stanislaus County	95351	
Westmont	1	Los Angeles County	90044	
Westmorland	1	Imperial County	92281	
West Napa	1	Napa County	94559	
West Orange	1	Orange County	92668	
West Palm Springs	1	Riverside County	92282	
West Park	1	Fresno County		
West Parlier	1	Fresno County		
West Petaluma	1	Sonoma County		
West Pittsburg	1	Contra Costa County	94565	
West Point	1	Calaveras County	95255	
Westport	1	Mendocino County	95488	
West Puente Valley	1	Los Angeles County	91744	
Westridge	1	San Mateo County	94015	
West Riverside	1	Riverside County		
West Sacramento	1	Yolo County	95605	91
West Santa Ana	1	Orange County		
West Santa Barbara	1	Santa Barbara County		
West Saticoy	1	Ventura County		
Westside	1	Fresno County		
Westside	1	San Bernardino County	92411	
Westside	1	Stanislaus County	95351	
West Venida	1	Tulare County		
Westvern	1	Los Angeles County	90062	
Westville	1	Placer County		
West Whittier	1	Los Angeles County	90606	
West Whittier-Los Nietos	1	Los Angeles County	90606	
Westwood	1	Lassen County	96137	
Westwood Acres	1	Santa Clara County	95020	
Westwood Siding	1	Los Angeles County		
Westwood Village	1	Humboldt County	95521	
Westwood Village	1	Los Angeles County	90024	
West Yermo	1	San Bernardino County		
Wheatland	1	Yuba County	95692	
Wheaton Springs	1	San Bernardino County		
Wheeler	1	Mendocino County		
Wheeler Ridge	1	Kern County	93203	43
Wheeler Springs	1	Ventura County	93023	
Whiskey Springs	1	Mendocino County		
Whiskeytown	1	Shasta County	96095	
Whiskeytown-Shasta-Trinity National Recreation Area	1	Shasta County	96095	
Whisky Falls	1	Madera County		
Whispering Pines	1	Lake County	95461	
Whispering Pines	1	San Diego County		
White Hall	1	El Dorado County	95725	
Whitehawk	1	Plumas County		
White Heather	1	Los Angeles County		
White Hills	1	Santa Barbara County		
White Hills Junction	1	Santa Barbara County		
White Horse	1	Modoc County		
White Pines	1	Calaveras County	95223	
White River	1	Tulare County	93257	
White River Summer Home Tract	1	Tulare County		
White Rock	1	Sacramento County	95630	
Whitesboro	1	Mendocino County		
Whitethorn	1	Humboldt County		
White Water	1	Riverside County	92282	
White Wolf	1	Tuolumne County		
Whitley Gardens	1	San Luis Obispo County	93446	
Whitlow	1	Humboldt County	95554	
Whitmore	1	Shasta County	96096	
Whitmore Hot Springs	1	Mono County		
Whitner Heights	1	Fresno County	93648	
Whitney	1	Placer County		
Whitney Portal	1	Inyo County		
Whittier	1	Los Angeles County	90601	10
Whittier Junction	1	Los Angeles County		
Whittier South	1	Los Angeles County		
Wilbur Springs	1	Colusa County	95987	
Wilcox	1	Los Angeles County	90038	
Wildasin	1	Los Angeles County		
Wildcat Canyon	1	Contra Costa County		
Wildflower	1	Fresno County	93662	
Wildomar	1	Riverside County	92595	
Wildrose	1	Inyo County	93562	
Wilds	1	Ventura County		
Wildwood	1	Humboldt County	95562	
Wildwood	1	Los Angeles County		
Wildwood	1	Santa Cruz County	95006	
Wildwood	1	Trinity County	96076	
Wilfred	1	Sonoma County	95407	
Wilkerson	1	Inyo County		
Willaura Estates	1	Nevada County	95945	
William H Taft	1	San Diego County	92117	
Williams	1	Colusa County	95987	
Willis Palms	1	Riverside County		
Willits	1	Mendocino County	95490	
Willota	1	Solano County		
Willowbrook	1	Los Angeles County	90222	
Willow Creek	1	Humboldt County	95573	
Willow Glen	1	Santa Clara County		
Willows	1	Glenn County	95988	
Willow Springs	1	Kern County	93560	
Willow Springs	1	Lassen County		
Willow Springs	1	Mono County		
Willow Springs	1	Tuolumne County	95372	
Willow Valley	1	Nevada County	95959	
Will Rogers	1	Los Angeles County	90403	
Wilmar	1	Los Angeles County	91770	
Wilmington	1	Los Angeles County	90744	
Wilmington Park	1	Los Angeles County	90744	
Wilseyville	1	Calaveras County	95257	
Wilshire-La Brea	1	Los Angeles County	90036	
Wilson	1	Sutter County		
Wilsona	1	Los Angeles County	93243	
Wilsona Gardens	1	Los Angeles County	93534	
Wilson Grove	1	Sonoma County		
Wilsonia	1	Tulare County	93633	
Wilton	1	Sacramento County	95693	
Wimp	1	Tulare County		
Winchester	1	Riverside County	92596	
Winco	1	Tulare County		
Windsor	1	Sonoma County	95492	
Windsor Hills	1	Los Angeles County	90056	
Wineland	1	Fresno County		
Wingfoot	1	Los Angeles County		
Wingo	1	Sonoma County		
Winnetka	1	Los Angeles County	91306	
Winos Corner	1	Fresno County		
Winter Gardens	1	San Diego County	92040	
Winterhaven	1	Imperial County	92283	
Winters	1	Yolo County	95694	
Wintersburg	1	Orange County		
Winterwarm	1	San Diego County	92028	
Winton	1	Merced County	95388	
Wise	1	Los Angeles County	90245	
Wiseburn	1	Los Angeles County	90250	
Wishon	1	Madera County	93669	
Witch Creek	1	San Diego County	92065	
Witter Springs	1	Lake County	95493	
Wofford Heights	1	Kern County	93285	
Wolf	1	Fresno County		
Wolf	1	Nevada County		
Wonderland	1	Plumas County	96001	
Woodacre	1	Marin County	94973	
Woodbridge	1	San Joaquin County	95258	
Woodcrest	1	Riverside County	92504	08
Woodford	1	Kern County		
Woodfords	1	Alpine County	96120	
Woodfords Community	1	Alpine County	96120	
Woodlake	1	San Joaquin County		
Woodlake	1	Tulare County	93286	
Woodlake Junction	1	Tulare County		
Woodland	1	Tulare County		
Woodland	1	Yolo County	95695	
Woodland Acres	1	Ventura County	93023	
Woodland Hills	1	Los Angeles County	91364	72
Woodland Park	1	Los Angeles County		
Woodlands	1	San Bernardino County		
Woodleaf	1	Yuba County	95925	
Woodruff Avenue	1	Los Angeles County	90706	
Woodsbro	1	San Joaquin County		
Woodside	1	San Mateo County	94062	
Woodside Glens	1	San Mateo County		
Woodside Highlands	1	San Mateo County	94062	
Woodside Highlands	1	San Mateo County		
Woodville	1	Marin County		
Woodville	1	Tulare County	93257	
Woody	1	Kern County	93287	
Woolsey Flat	1	Nevada County		
Workfield	1	Monterey County	93941	
Workman	1	Los Angeles County	90280	
Worswick	1	Humboldt County		
Worth	1	Tulare County		
Wrights Beach	1	Sonoma County		
Wrightwood	1	San Bernardino County	92397	
Wunpost	1	Monterey County		
Wyandotte	1	Butte County	95965	
Wyeth	1	Tulare County		
Wynola	1	San Diego County	92070	
Wyntoon	1	Siskiyou County	96057	
Wyo	1	Glenn County		
