= Red Dirt Rising =

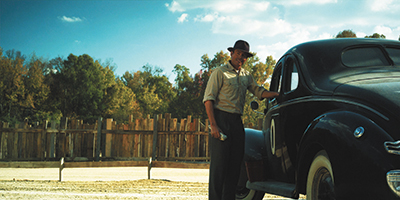
- Directed by: Kathleen Bobak; James Suttles
- Written by: J. Amanda Davidson; Gail Cauble Gurley
- Based on: Red Dirt Tracks: The Forgotten Heroes of Early Stockcar Racing by Gail Cauble Gurley
- Produced by: Todd Morris; Kathleen Bobak; James Suttles
- Starring: Brad Yoder; Burgess Jenkins; Brett Rice; Bill Oberst Jr
- Cinematography: James Suttles
- Edited by: James Suttles
- Music by: Cliff Downs
- Distributed by: Green Apple Entertainment; Native Intelligence
- Release date: January 11, 2011
- Running time: 93 minutes
- Country: United States
- Language: English

Red Dirt Rising is a 2011 film starring Brad Yoder, Burgess Jenkins and Brett Rice based on the book Red Dirt Tracks: The Forgotten Heroes of Early Stockcar Racing by Gail Cauble Gurley telling the true story of race car driver Jimmie Lewallen. The film dramatizes the birth of NASCAR in the 1930s and 1940s.

== Plot ==
The film tells the true story of stock car racing legend Jimmie Lewallen and his friends Bill Blair, Sr. and Fred Harb. Early in his life, Jimmie Lewallen struggles to dig himself out of a life of poverty. Choosing to attempt a living by bootlegging, he and his lifelong friend Bill Blair risk everything but through attempts to build a faster getaway vehicle for bootlegging, they inadvertently become a part of the birth of stock-car racing. As time passes, Jimmie marries his wife Carrie James and starts a family but the pressures of family responsibilities starts to tear Jimmie away from his love of stock-car racing. In one critically historic moment, Jimmie turns down an offer from future NASCAR founder, Bill France Sr. at an opportunity to "buy into NASCAR" for $500.00. Jimmie refused, saying "it would never amount to anything". Set during the 1930s and 1940s, the film portrays the life and times of those involved with stock car racing before NASCAR was a household name.

== Cast ==
- Brad Yoder as Jimmie Lewallen
- Burgess Jenkins as Bill Blair
- Brett Rice as Roy Lewallen
- Bill Oberst Jr. as Buck
- R. Keith Harris as Mr. Nance
- Ashlee Payne as Carrie
- Quentin Kerr as Fred Harb
- Austin Carty as Curtis Turner
- Keith Barber as Brack
- Ben Mabry as Henry Suttles

== Production ==
Filming began in October 2007 for 24 days and was completed in November, 2007 in Archdale, North Carolina, and High Point, North Carolina, showcasing English Farm. Due to the timing of the production and the release of the Red One Digital Cinema Camera in the United States on August 31, 2007, Red Dirt Rising was one of the first feature-length film shot on the new camera system. Additional photography including the World War II sequences and some minor reshoots were completed in the summer of 2009.

== Release ==
The world premiere of the film was held at the North Wilkesboro Speedway in North Wilkesboro, North Carolina, on May 15, 2010, at an outdoor screening to an audience of approximately 4000. Throughout the summer of 2010, the film was in limited release theatrically throughout the Southeast and mid Atlantic in over 25 theaters and also screened at numerous regional premieres around the United States including Buffalo, New York; Columbia, South Carolina; Knoxville, Iowa; Cumberland Gap, Tennessee; and Jacksonville, Florida. The film was screened at the International Reel Wheel Film Festival in Knoxville, Iowa, on April 22–24, 2010. The film was screened out of competition at the Modern Film Fest in Kannapolis, North Carolina, on October 1, 2010. On January 11, 2011, the film was released for rental and retail on DVD, Blu-ray and Digital Download through Otter Creek Motion Pictures and Native Intelligence Distribution and carried for sell through retailers such as Walmart, Amazon, iTunes.

It was announced throughout the production and release of the film that a percentage of the proceeds would be donated to the Racing Legends Medical Hardship Fund, a nonprofit organization founded in 1991.

== Music ==
The soundtrack and score for the film were produced by Emmy Award Winner Cliff Downs. Artists on the soundtrack include Grammy Winner Steve Wariner, Stephanie Bentley (who also wrote "Breathe" for Faith Hill), and the band Whisky Falls. The score for the film was written by Cliff Downs. Effort was made by Cliff Downs to replicate the sound from the era depicted by utilizing vintage electric guitar sounds from that era.

Two music videos were produced by the producers of the film to accompany the release of the soundtrack and film. The music video "Carolina Moonshine" by Matt Dylan in which NASCAR Legend Junior Johnson appeared, became a viral hit with over 200,000 views. The North Carolina Highway Patrol provided the antique police car used in the filming of the music video "Carolina Moonshine". The second video, "Carrie James" by Jeff Tillman was written as a love letter to Jimmie Lewallen's wife.
