= James Suttles =

American filmmaker (born 1980)

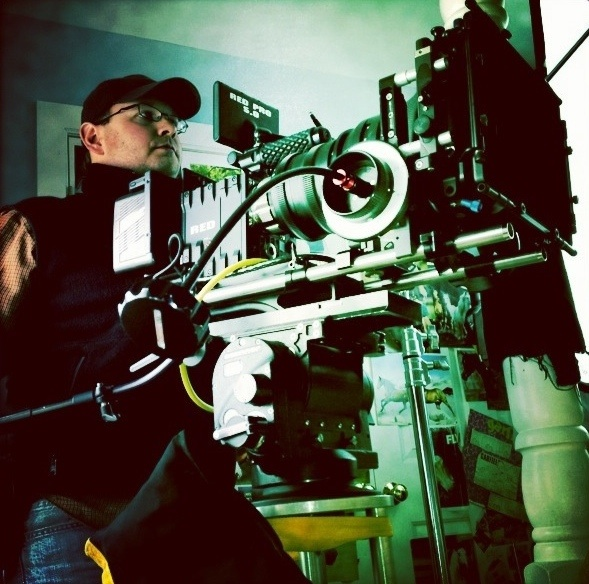
- Born: James Suttles; September 21, 1980 (age 45); Brevard, North Carolina, United States
- Occupation: Filmmaker

James Suttles (born September 21, 1980, in Brevard, North Carolina) is an American filmmaker. Suttles grew up in Brevard, North Carolina, attending Brevard High School. At the age of 26, he directed his first feature film Red Dirt Rising and also served as Producer, Cinematographer and Editor. He currently resides in Western North Carolina with his family.

== Early life ==
Suttles grew up on a small farm outside Brevard, North Carolina, residing primarily with his grandparents after his mother died on December 5, 1982. At the age of 13, he was cast as an extra in the Disney film Heavyweights, where his interest in filmmaking was born. "I was only 13 or so but I was enthralled by the collaborative nature and the amount of work it takes to make a movie."

== Film work ==
- Director of Photography on the feature film Alone yet Not Alone, one of the most controversial Academy Award Nominated film of 2014. The film received a limited release on September 27, 2013, in 9 cities and was the number 1 movie for theaters in Knoxville, Tenn.; Raleigh, N.C.; Colorado Springs, Colo.; Grand Rapids, Mich.; and San Antonio, Texas. It was the No. 2 film in Dallas, Atlanta and Nashville area theaters, in terms of per screen average. The film was scheduled to have a wider release on June 13, 2014, with the renewed interest in the film due to the Oscar controversy. In reference to James Suttles' work on the film, the Dove Foundation's review wrote that "the cinematography was inspiring".
- In pre-production on his third film as a Director, a horror/thriller titled The Manor
- His second film as a Director is titled Reunion 108, written by Major League Baseball player Billy Sample.
- Producer, Director, Cinematographer and Editor on the feature film Red Dirt Rising, which was released nationally on January 11, 2011.
- Cinematographer on the 2014 film Hurry Scurry
- Cinematographer on the 2013 film The Senior Prank
- Cinematographer on the 2012 film Hero
- Cinematographer on the 2012 film For the Glory
- Cinematographer on the 2008 film Randomocity
- Cinematographer and Editor on the 2007 film A Dance for Bethany
- Producer, Cinematographer and Editor of the 2002 Documentary Women of these Hills: Three Cultures of Appalachia
- Directed the Music Video "Carolina Moonshine" by artist Matt Dylan featuring a cameo by NASCAR driver Junior Johnson
- Directed The Nest, a horror film released in July 2021

== Other work ==
In late 2012, Suttles produced in association with Cine' Foundry and Vidmuze, the world's first 4K Damage Pack designed for the visual effects industry.

It was announced in early 2013 that Suttles would launch a set of courses designed to educate up and coming filmmakers interested in the grip, electric and camera trades.

In 2014 he began pre-production on the feature film Seven Days 'Till Midnight.

Suttles was the cinematographer on a series of projects for QSP/Reader's Digest/Time Inc that utilized talent including the Harlem Globetrotters, Ryan Sheckler, Nick Cannon, Travis Pastrana and Terry Fator.
