= 1960 International 200 =

Auto race held at Bowman Gray Stadium in 1960

Race details
- Race 22 of 44 in the 1960 NASCAR Grand National Series season
- Date: June 26, 1960
- Official name: International 200
- Location: Bowman Gray Stadium, Winston-Salem, North Carolina
- Course: Permanent racing facility
- Course length: 0.421 km (0.250 miles)
- Distance: 200 laps, 50.0 mi (35.0 km)
- Weather: Very hot with temperatures of 90 °F (32 °C); wind speeds of 15.9 miles per hour (25.6 km/h)
- Average speed: 45.782 miles per hour (73.679 km/h)
- Attendance: 10,500

Pole position
Driver	Lee Petty	Petty Enterprises

Most laps led
Driver	Glen Wood	Wood Brothers
- Laps: 200

Winner
No. 16	Glen Wood	Wood Brothers

Television in the United States
- Network: untelevised
- Announcers: none

The 1960 International 200 was a NASCAR Grand National Series event that was held on June 26, 1960, at Bowman Gray Stadium in Winston-Salem, North Carolina.

The transition to purpose-built racecars began in the early 1960s and occurred gradually over that decade. Changes made to the sport by the late 1960s brought an end to the "strictly stock" vehicles of the 1950s.

== Background ==
Bowman Gray Stadium is a NASCAR sanctioned 1/4-mile (0.40 km) asphalt flat oval short track and longstanding football stadium located in Winston-Salem, North Carolina. It is one of stock car racing's most legendary venues, and is referred to as "NASCAR's longest-running weekly race track". Bowman Gray Stadium is part of the Winston-Salem Sports and Entertainment Complex and is home of the Winston-Salem State University Rams football team. It was also the home of the Wake Forest University football team from 1956 until Groves Stadium (later BB&T Field) opened in 1968.

== Race report ==
It took one hour and five minutes to resolve two hundred laps of racing. The average speed of the race was 45.872 miles per hour (73.824 km/h) while Lee Petty would qualify for the pole position with a speed of 47.850 miles per hour (77.007 km/h). These speeds would be relatively slow on today's highway systems for passenger automobiles. Glen Wood managed to defeat Petty by half a lap in the actual race.

A magnificent combination of driver skill and the lighter non-American vehicles would do a lot to overcome raw horsepower at Bowman Gray Stadium. The modern NASCAR Cup Series is more influenced by futuristic technology typically found in Formula One vehicles; making driver skill secondary to impromptu luck-based strategies made during the race. The foreign makes that participated in this race were the MG (as a part of Great Britain's now-defunct MG Cars) and the Triumph (as a part of Great Britain's now-defunct Triumph Motor Company). Smokey Cook would end up as the last-place finisher in a 1952 MG T-type.

Lowe's appeared as an official NASCAR sponsor for the first time in its history. Ten thousand and five hundred people appeared in person to watch this live untelevised race. This would be the 22nd race out of the 44 raced that year; making this race the official halfway point of the 1960 Grand National Series season.

Individual race winnings ranged from the winner's share of $1,125 ($11,957 when adjusted for inflation) to the last-place finisher's share of $140 ($1,488 when adjusted for inflation). NASCAR allowed the organizers of this event to give out a grand total of $4,755 for all the qualifying drivers ($50,540 when adjusted for inflation).

=== Qualifying ===
Grid	No.	Driver	Manufacturer	Owner
1	42	Lee Petty	'60 Plymouth	Petty Enterprises
2	43	Richard Petty	'60 Plymouth	Petty Enterprises
3	16	Glen Wood	'58 Ford	Wood Brothers
4	21	Bob Welborn	'59 Ford	Wood Brothers
5	4	Rex White	'59 Chevrolet	Rex White
6	11	Ned Jarrett	'60 Ford	Ned Jarrett
7	13	Joe Weatherly	'60 Valiant	Fred Wheat
8	74	Buck Baker	'58 Chevrolet	L.D. Austin
9	36	Tommy Irwin	'59 T-Bird	Tommy Irwin
10	9	Roy Tyner	'60 Ford	Roy Tyner
11	17	Fred Harb	'58 Ford	Fred Harb
12	1	Paul Lewis	'58 Chevrolet	Jess Potter
13	54	Jimmy Pardue	'59 Dodge	Ebart Clifton
14	78	Jimmie Lewallen	'57 Ford	unknown
15	79	Jack Hart	'57 Triumph	unknown
16	17X	Billy Whitley	'54 Corvette	unknown
17	3	Smokey Cook	'52 MG	unknown
18	25	Bill Massey	'59 MG	unknown

== Finishing order ==
Section reference:

1. Glen Wood† (No. 16)
2. Lee Petty† (No. 42)
3. Rex White (No. 4)
4. Richard Petty (No. 43)
5. Ned Jarrett (No. 11)
6. Joe Weatherly† (No. 12)
7. Tommy Irwin (No. 36)
8. Buck Baker† (No. 74)
9. Fred Harb† (No. 17)
10. Jimmy Pardue† (No. 54)
11. Roy Tyner† (No. 9)
12. Paul Lewis (No. 1)
13. Bob Welborn† (No. 21)
14. Jack Hart (No. 79)
15. Bill Massey* (No. 25)
16. Bill Whitley* (No. 17X)
17. Jimmie Lewallen*† (No. 78)
18. Smokey Cook* (No. 3)

* Driver failed to finish race
† Driver is deceased

== Timeline ==
Section reference:

- Start of race: Glen Wood started the race with the pole position; Smokey Cook's steering problem caused him to become the last-place finisher.
- Lap 2: Jimmie Lewallen's engine became problematic; causing him to withdraw from the race.
- Lap 6: Bill Whitley's vehicle overheated; ending his day on the track.
- Lap 71: The axle on Bill Massey's vehicle became problematic; forcing him to end the race.
- End of the race: Glen Wood won the race.

Preceded by 1960 World 600	NASCAR Grand National Series Season; 1960	Succeeded by 1960 Firecracker 250
