= Jimmie Lewallen =

American racing driver (1919–1995)

- Born: August 22, 1919; High Point, North Carolina, U.S.
- Died: October 16, 1995 (aged 76); Winston-Salem, North Carolina, U.S.
- Cause of death: Cancer

NASCAR Cup Series career
- 142 races run over 12 years
- Best finish: 8th (1954)
- First race: 1949 Race No. 1 (Charlotte)
- Last race: 1960 International 200 (Bowman Gray)
| Wins | Top tens | Poles |
|---|---|---|
| 0 | 57 | 1 |

NASCAR Convertible Division career
- 38 races run over 3 years
- Best finish: 6th (1956)
- First race: 1956 Race No. 12 (Langhorne)
- Last race: 1959 Catawba 250 (Hickory)
| Wins | Top tens | Poles |
|---|---|---|
| 0 | 26 | 1 |

Jimmie Lewallen (August 22, 1919 – October 16, 1995) was an American stock car racing driver from High Point, North Carolina, United States. He competed in NASCAR's Strictly Stock/Grand National division (now called the NASCAR Cup Series) from its first race at Charlotte Speedway in 1949 until 1960.

== Racing career ==
Lewallen began his racing career in motorcycles in 1934. He switched to racing cars in the late 1930s when he delivered illegal moonshine to other parts of North Carolina. Many early NASCAR drivers were moonshine runners. He raced at a one-mile (1.6 km) dirt track in High Point, until he went off to World War II in 1941. He served in the European Theater of Operations (ETO) until 1945, including the Battle of Normandy. He was wounded twice and received numerous medals.

Lewallen resumed racing after he returned home from the war. Lewallen attended an October 12, 1946 meeting that formed NASCAR. The meeting was held at the Rex Hotel on Peachtree Street in Atlanta Georgia. Around twelve people attended, including Bill France Sr., Red Vogt, and Raymond Parks. Bill France offered him a chance to "buy into NASCAR" for $500.00 ($8,255.12 when adjusted for inflation) but Lewallen turned him down, saying "it would never amount to anything".

Lewallen raced in NASCAR's first stock car race at Charlotte Speedway in 1949. He finished sixteenth and earned $25 ($338.29 when adjusted for inflation). Lewallen won the Modified championship at Bowman Gray Stadium in 1950 and would later drive a second car for Petty Enterprises in 1953 at West Palm Beach Speedway. That would result in finishing second for that race behind teammate Lee Petty. He had three consecutive top-ten finishes in the series points from 1953 until 1955. His best career race finish was second, which he accomplished five times. While Lewallen never won in the Grand National Division, he won dozens of races in NASCAR's Modified and Sportsman divisions as well as the 1950 Bowman Gray Stadium Modified Championship. Lewallen raced for various owners throughout his career. He raced in various divisions until 1975. He helped found the "Old Timer Racing Club". Lewallen died from cancer on October 16, 1995, at a Winston-Salem hospital.

Lewallen, Fred Harb, and Bill Blair Sr. are the subject of the upcoming independent movie Red Dirt Rising, which is based on the book "Red Dirt Tracks: The Forgotten Heroes of Early Stockcar Racing" by Gail Cauble Gurley.
