= Whitesboro =

Whitesboro may refer to:

- Whitesboro, California
- Whitesboro, New Jersey
- Whitesboro, New York
- Whitesboro, Oklahoma
- Whitesboro, Texas
