= Wengler =

Wengler is a German surname. Notable people with this surname include:

- Heinz Wengler (1912–1942), German bicycle racer
- Marcel Wengler (born 1946), Luxembourg composer and conductor
- Maximilian Wengler (1890–1945), World War II German general

== See also ==
- Wengler, California - see List of places in California (W)
