= Walteria =

Walteria may refer to:

- Walteria, California, a region of the city of Torrance in southern California
- Walteria (sponge), a genus of animals in the family Euplectellidae
- A name used for a species now belonging in the genus Glanosuchus
