= Brevard High School =

American public school in North Carolina

Location
- 609 N Country Club Rd; Brevard, North Carolina 28712; United States; 35°13′02″N 82°44′06″W

Information
- School type: Public
- School district: Transylvania County Schools
- CEEB code: 340445
- Principal: David Galloway
- Staff: 59.21 (FTE)
- Grades: 9–12
- Enrollment: 807 (2023-2024)
- Student to teacher ratio: 13.63
- Colors: Blue and white
- Mascot: Blue Devils
- Website: bhs.tcsnc.org

Brevard High School is a public high school in Brevard, North Carolina, one of three in the Transylvania County Schools district. In the 2022–2023 school year, it had an enrollment of 751. David "Mick" Galloway became the principal at the start of the 2023–2024 school year.

== History ==
The school was located on South Broad Street from 1925 until the 1959–60 school year, when the campus on North Country Club Road opened. Until court-ordered desegregation began in 1963, Brevard High was white, and black students attended a school in Hendersonville.

== Athletics ==
Brevard High School is a member of the North Carolina High School Athletic Association (NCHSAA). Its team name is the Blue Devils. Sports include basketball, cross-country, golf, football, soccer, track, volleyball, and wrestling.

The football team has won the state championship three times. In 1960, they won their first state championship, winning the NCHSAA 3A title. In 1963, a racially integrated team played Reidsville High School to a 0–0 draw in the NCHSAA 3A Region 2 championship; the teams were declared co-champions and after winning a coin toss, Brevard took the trophy. In 1982, Brevard won the NCHSAA 3A state championship for the second outright time, after going undefeated.

Brevard has had a longstanding athletic rivalry with the Hendersonville High School Bearcats; incidents with unruly spectators led to a 1963 ban on competitions between the two teams without special permission.

== Notable alumni ==
- Mickey Marvin, former NFL offensive guard and two-time Super Bowl champion with the Oakland/Los Angeles Raiders
- Steve Penn, handball player who represented the United States at the 1996 Summer Olympics
- James Suttles, filmmaker
