= The Nest (2021 film) =

- Directed by: James Suttles
- Written by: Jennifer Trudrung
- Produced by: James Suttles; Matthew R. Zboyovski
- Starring: Sarah Navratil; Kevin Patrick Murphy; Maple Suttles; Drez Ryan; Dee Wallace; Blaque Flowers; Anna Lynn Holleman; Penny Munroe
- Cinematography: Greg Hudgins
- Edited by: Aaron Putnam
- Music by: Neil Lee Griffin
- Production company: SuttleFilm
- Distributed by: 4Digital Media
- Release dates: May 29, 2021 (Grimmfest International Festival of Fantastic Film); July 20, 2021 (U.S.)
- Running time: 107 minutes
- Country: United States
- Language: English

The Nest, also known as The Bewailing, is a 2021 American horror film directed by James Suttles, starring Sarah Navratil, Kevin Patrick Murphy, Maple Suttles, Drez Ryan, Dee Wallace, Blaque Flowers, Anna Lynn Holleman and Penny Munroe.

== Cast ==
- Sarah Navratil as Beth
- Kevin Patrick Murphy as Jack
- Maple Suttles as Meg
- Drez Ryan as Ashe
- Dee Wallace as Marissa
- Blaque Flowers as Nick
- Anna Lynn Holleman as Mrs. Jean
- Penny Munroe as Billie
- Piper Suttles as Child at the Window

== Release ==
The film received a wide Digital, Cable, and DVD release on July 29, 2021.

== Reception ==
Paul Mount of Starburst rated the film 4 stars out of 5, calling it a "haunting and sometimes flesh-crawling experience enlivened by some pleasing practical visual effects and a sense of ambiguity in relation to the nature and purpose of the parasite creature itself." Jonathan W. Hickman of the Newnan Times-Herald rated the film 6 out of 10, calling it "compelling and thoroughly unsettling". Alix Turner of Horror Obsessive wrote a positive review of the film.

Alain Elliot of Nerdly rated the film 2 stars out of 5, writing that it "falls into the ‘what could have been’ category and never lives up to its promise of a twisted but intriguing body horror."
