= Fitzhugh Dodson =

American psychologist and writer (1923-1993)

Fitzhugh J. Dodson
- Born: October 28, 1923; Baltimore, Maryland, US
- Died: May 2, 1993; Long Beach, California, US
- Occupations: Clinical psychologist, lecturer, educator, author
- Notable work: How to parent (1971)

Fitzhugh J. Dodson (October 28, 1923, Baltimore, Maryland – May 2, 1993, Long Beach, California) was an American clinical psychologist, lecturer and educator. He wrote several popular books including the best-selling How to Parent.

== Biography ==
Dodson was born in Baltimore, Maryland, United States in 1923. His father also bore the name Fitzhugh J. Dodson (born c. 1886 in Virginia) and his mother was Lillian M. Dodson, née Northam (born c. 1890 in Maryland). He attended high school in Baltimore, living at 704 Wyndhurst Avenue with his parents, younger sister and maternal grandparents. He went on to graduate cum laude with a bachelor's degree from Johns Hopkins University in 1944, then gained his Bachelor of Divinity degree magna cum laude from Yale University in 1948 and his PhD was conferred by the University of Southern California in 1957. He went on to become a member of over ten scholarly associations.

During his student years he was editor of a newspaper, president of the freshman class, senior member of the student council, business manager of the debating council and a member of Beta Theta Pi, Phi Beta Kappa, Pi Delta Epsilon and Omicron Delta Kappa. He had summer pastorates in Tennessee, West Virginia and southern Oregon.

He was ordained as a Presbyterian minister in 1948, and on November 6, 1949, he was installed as pastor of the Palatine Hill Presbyterian Church in Portland, Oregon and he also taught religion at the nearby Lewis and Clark College., then from 1957 to 1958 he was director of counseling centers in Portland and Los Angeles.

He married Grace Goheen, a preschool director, on August 1, 1958, and in 1959 he joined the staff of El Camino College in Torrance, California, to teach philosophy; then from 1962 taught in the Psychology Department of California State University, Long Beach. He also taught at UCLA Extension.

He was senior psychological consultant to Project Head Start in Long Beach Unified School District.

He founded the internationally famous La Primera pre-school in Walteria, Torrance, California. Building started in May 1963; the school was designed for children aged three to five and also for the training of pre-school teachers; his wife became director of the school and Dodson himself had the role of consultant.

He went on to work as a clinical psychologist in private practice in Redondo Beach for more than 25 years, treating children, adolescents and adults by both individual and group psychotherapy and also educating parents and undertaking marriage counselling. He wrote a number of books, including the best-selling How to parent and How to father, both of which were translated into a number of languages. He married his second wife, Cecelia Kovacs, on January 26, 1974.

Dodson died of heart failure at the age of 69 on May 2, 1993, at the Alamitos Belmont Rehabilitation Hospital in Long Beach, California. His survivors included three children from his first marriage, Robin Ellyn, Randall James and Rustin Fitzhugh.

== Teachings ==
Dodson taught that children need both love and discipline, and this was seen as a contradiction to the permissive approach attributed to Dr. Benjamin Spock. He stated, "Many parents also have the impression that modern psychology teaches that you should not spank children. Some psychologists and psychiatrists have actually stated this idea in print. However, as a psychologist, I believe it is impossible to raise children effectively—particularly aggressive, forceful boys—without spanking them."

He continued, "This does not mean that any kind of spanking is all right for a child. I want to make it clear that there is a "right" kind of spanking and a "wrong" kind. By the wrong kind I mean a cruel and sadistic beating. This fills a child with hatred, and a deep desire for revenge. This is the kind that is administered with a strap or stick or some other type of parental "weapon." Or it could also mean a humiliating slap in the face. The right kind of spanking needs no special paraphernalia. Just the hand of the parent administered a few times on the kid's bottom. The right kind of spanking is a positive thing. It clears the air, and is vastly preferable to moralistic and guilt-inducing parental lectures."

Alongside this teaching, he strongly emphasised the importance of a strong, loving family structure, and favoured three-generation extended families; he taught that society should train people in parenting and grandparenting skills, suggesting that parenting should be taught in high schools, and that evening classes should also be available.

== Publications ==
His published works include:

=== Books ===
- Dodson, Fitzhugh (1971). How to parent. Signet Book. ISBN 978-0352300126. (also translated into German, French, Dutch, Hebrew, Spanish, Portuguese, Japanese, Arabic, Chinese, Korean, Thai and Turkish)
- Dodson, Fitzhugh (1975). How to father. Penguin. ISBN 978-0451154361. (also translated into Turkish, French, Japanese, Korean, Vietnamese, Persian, Italian and German)
- Dodson, Fitzhugh (1976). The you that could be. Follett Pub Co. ISBN 978-0695806064.
- Dodson, Fitzhugh (1978). How to discipline with love: From crib to college. Penguin. ISBN 978-0892560233.
- Dodson, Fitzhugh (1978). I Wish I Had a Computer That Makes Waffles: Teaching Your Child With Modern Nursery Rhymes. Oak Tree Pubns. ISBN 978-0866790062.
- Dodson, Fitzhugh (1979). The carnival kidnap caper. Oak Tree Pubns. ISBN 978-0916392406.
- Dodson, Fitzhugh (1981). Give Your Child a Head Start in Reading. Simon and Schuster. ISBN 978-0671436414.
- Dodson, Fitzhugh; Reuben, Paula (1984). How to grandparent. New American Library. ISBN 978-0690018745.
- Dodson, Fitzhugh; Alexander, Ann (1986). Your child: Birth to age 6. Fireside. ISBN 978-0671458942.
- Dodson, Fitzhugh (1988). How to single parent. Gallery Books. ISBN 978-0060914875.

=== Other works ===
- Dodson, Fitzhugh James (1957), Personality Factors in the Choice of the Protestant Ministry as a Vocation (PhD thesis)
- Dodson, Fitzhugh; Harris, Jeanne (1976). "How to Father". American Journal of Nursing. 76 (1): 79. doi:10.1097/00000446-197601000-00042.

== Memberships ==
Dodson's memberships included:

- American Psychological Association
- American Group Therapy Association
- American Anthropological Association
- American Sociological Association
- American Association for the Advancement of Science
- Academy of Religion and Mental Health
- Society for the Study of Religion
- Western Psychological Association
- California Psychological Association
- Los Angeles Psychological Association
- Los Angeles Society of Clinical Psychologists
- Phi Beta Kappa
