= Allen Hunt =

American Catholic author and speaker (born 1964)

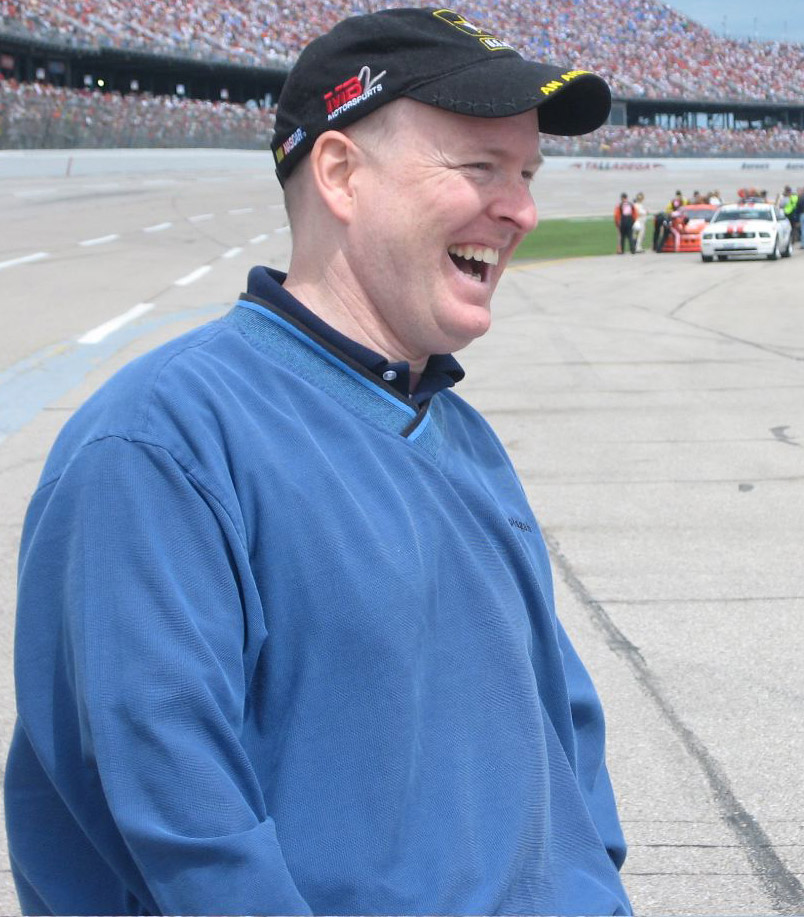
- Born: January 6, 1964 (age 62); Los Angeles, California
- Education: PhD Yale University; M.Div Emory University; B.A. Mercer University
- Occupation: Author
- Employer: The Dynamic Catholic Institute
- Spouse: Anita Hunt
- Children: Sarah Ann and Griffin Elizabeth
- Website: drallenhunt.com

Allen R. Hunt (born January 6, 1964, in Los Angeles, California) is an American author and speaker. He is a former Methodist pastor and a convert to the Catholic Church.

== Early life ==
Allen R. Hunt was born on January 6, 1964, in Los Angeles, California. He was raised in Brevard, North Carolina. Later, he and his family moved to Lakeland, Florida, where Hunt graduated from high school.

== Education ==
Hunt graduated from Lakeland High School, home of the Dreadnaughts. He completed two undergraduate degrees in Finance and History in Mercer University in Macon, Georgia and later, and a Master of Divinity degree at Emory University. Hunt also completed his Ph.D. in New Testament and Ancient Christian Origins at Yale University in 1994.

== Career ==
Hunt worked for Kurt Salmon Associates, an international management consulting firm. In his work at the firm he focused on strategy and marketing assistance for textile and apparel companies as well as work in mergers and acquisitions.

Hunt then returned to school to pursue full-time ordained ministry in the United Methodist Church. As a pastor, Hunt served in three local churches: in Carrollton, Georgia; Rome, Georgia; and Mount Pisgah in Alpharetta, Georgia, a suburb of Atlanta. His ministry included time as the leader of a small, rural church, a new church start, and a leading megachurch with a membership over 8,000.

In 2005, Hunt became a part of a new ministry venture, which evolved into The Allen Hunt Show on WSB. As the show grew, Allen Hunt was unable to serve both jobs as a full-time pastor and a talk-show radio and speaker host, so he stepped down from his pastoral role at Mount Pisgah in 2007 and became a full-time talk show radio host. The Allen Hunt Show grew from a small weekend presence in Atlanta into a nationally syndicated weekend show by Cox Radio on Saturday and Sunday nights in markets all over the United States.

In February, 2009, Allen was named to the Talkers Magazine's 100 heavy hitters in talk radio, receiving an unprecedented ranking for a newcomer in the industry.

In January 2008, Hunt severed his formal ties with the United Methodist Church and announced his conversion to the Catholic Church.

== Annual luncheons ==
Hunt and his team have hosted charity luncheons benefiting Murphy-Harpst Children's Home in Cedartown, Georgia. Both events were held in Atlanta, Georgia. The first Annual Allen Hunt Show Luncheon was hosted at the Cobb Galleria and featured keynote speaker Vince Dooley. The second Annual Allen Hunt Show Luncheon was moved to the Cobb Energy Centre and featured keynote speaker University of Georgia Head Football Coach Mark Richt.

== Publications ==
"No Regrets," publisher Wellspring; ISBN 1635822661

"The Fourth Quarter of Your Life: Embracing What Matters Most." publisher Wellspring; ASIN B0BN6WC8VP
