= Westhaven-Moonstone, California =

Westhaven-Moonstone
- census-designated place
- Location in Humboldt County and the state of California
- Coordinates: 41°2′22″N 124°6′40″W
- Country: United States
- State: California
- County: Humboldt

Area
  - Total: 8.121 sq mi (21.034 km^{2})
  - Land: 8.094 sq mi (20.964 km^{2})
  - Water: 0.027 sq mi (0.071 km^{2}) 0.34%

Population (2020)
  - Total: 1,187
  - Density: 146.6/sq mi (56.62/km^{2})
- Time zone: UTC-8 (Pacific (PST))
  - Summer (DST): UTC-7 (PDT)
- ZIP code: 95570
- Area code: 707
- FIPS code: 06-84385
- GNIS feature ID: 2409573

Westhaven-Moonstone is a census-designated place (CDP) located in Humboldt County, California, United States. As of the 2020 census the population was 1,187, down from 1,205 at the 2010 census.

== Geography ==
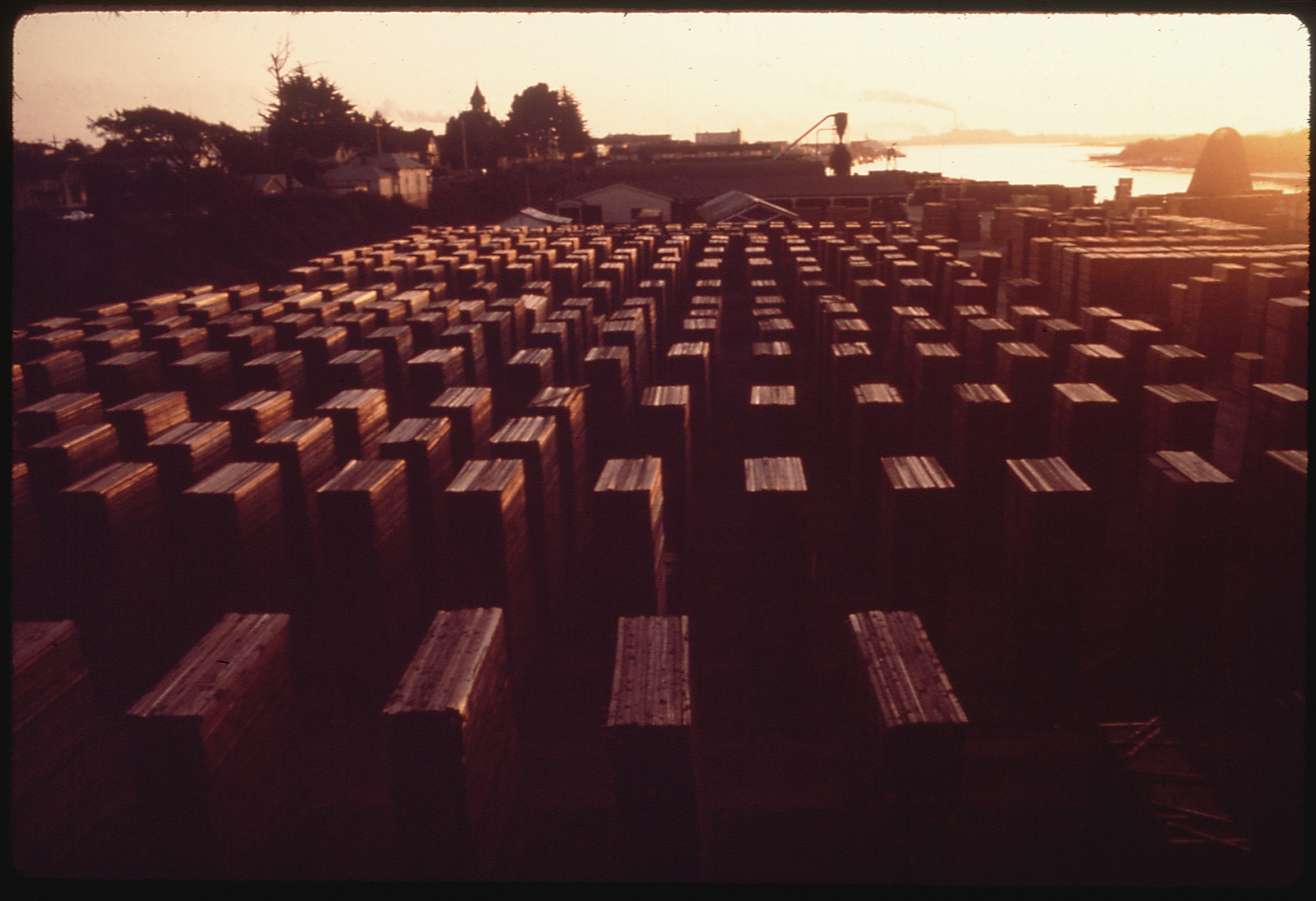
A lumber yard in Moonstone, 1972

According to the United States Census Bureau, the CDP has a total area of 8.1 square miles (21 km^{2}), of which, over 99% is land.

== Demographics ==
Historical population
Census	Pop.	Note	%±
1990	1,109		—
2000	1,044		−5.9%
2010	1,205		15.4%
2020	1,187		−1.5%
U.S. Decennial Census; 1860–1870 1880-1890; 1900 1910 1920; 1930 1940 1950; 1960 1970 1980; 1990 2000 2010; 2020

Westhaven-Moonstone first appeared as a census designated place in the 1990 U.S. census.

=== Racial and ethnic composition ===
Westhaven-Moonstone, CDP, California – Racial and ethnic composition Note: the US Census treats Hispanic/Latino as an ethnic category. This table excludes Latinos from the racial categories and assigns them to a separate category. Hispanics/Latinos may be of any race.
Race / Ethnicity (NH = Non-Hispanic)	Pop 2000	Pop 2010	Pop 2020	% 2000	% 2010	% 2020
White alone (NH)	898	1,049	932	86.02%	87.05%	78.52%
Black or African American alone (NH)	0	8	1	0.00%	0.66%	0.08%
Native American or Alaska Native alone (NH)	51	33	53	4.89%	2.74%	4.47%
Asian alone (NH)	9	18	14	0.86%	1.49%	1.18%
Native Hawaiian or Pacific Islander alone (NH)	0	0	0	0.00%	0.00%	0.00%
Other race alone (NH)	0	7	9	0.00%	0.58%	0.76%
Mixed race or Multiracial (NH)	44	37	72	4.21%	3.07%	6.07%
Hispanic or Latino (any race)	42	53	106	4.02%	4.40%	8.93%
Total	1,044	1,205	1,187	100.00%	100.00%	100.00%

=== 2020 census ===
As of the 2020 census, Westhaven-Moonstone had a population of 1,187, all of whom lived in households. The population density was 146.7 inhabitants per square mile (56.6/km^{2}).

The age distribution was 206 people (17.4%) under the age of 18, 72 people (6.1%) aged 18 to 24, 247 people (20.8%) aged 25 to 44, 356 people (30.0%) aged 45 to 64, and 306 people (25.8%) who were 65 years of age or older. The median age was 48.3 years. For every 100 females, there were 97.5 males, and for every 100 females age 18 and over there were 91.6 males age 18 and over.

0.0% of residents lived in urban areas, while 100.0% lived in rural areas.

There were 516 households, out of which 116 (22.5%) had children under the age of 18 living in them, 213 (41.3%) were married-couple households, 38 (7.4%) were cohabiting couple households, 149 (28.9%) had a female householder with no spouse or partner present, and 116 (22.5%) had a male householder with no spouse or partner present. 170 households (32.9%) were one person, and 79 (15.3%) were one person aged 65 or older. The average household size was 2.3. There were 301 families (58.3% of all households).

There were 600 housing units at an average density of 74.1 units per square mile (28.6 units/km^{2}), of which 516 (86.0%) were occupied. Of these, 376 (72.9%) were owner-occupied, and 140 (27.1%) were occupied by renters. The homeowner vacancy rate was 3.1%; the rental vacancy rate was 9.4%.

=== Income and poverty ===
In 2023, the US Census Bureau estimated that the median household income was $63,843, and the per capita income was $42,485. About 5.3% of families and 14.0% of the population were below the poverty line.

=== 2010 census ===
The 2010 United States census reported that Westhaven-Moonstone had a population of 1,205. The population density was 148.2 inhabitants per square mile (57.2/km^{2}). The racial makeup of Westhaven-Moonstone was 1,083 (89.9%) White, 9 (0.7%) African American, 39 (3.2%) Native American, 18 (1.5%) Asian, 0 (0.0%) Pacific Islander, 10 (0.8%) from other races, and 46 (3.8%) from two or more races. Hispanic or Latino of any race were 53 persons (4.4%).

The Census reported that 1,205 people (100% of the population) lived in households, and none (0%) lived in non-institutionalized group quarters, and none (0%) were institutionalized.

There were 548 households, out of which 128 (23.4%) had children under the age of 18 living in them, 226 (41.2%) were opposite-sex married couples living together, 50 (9.1%) had a female householder with no husband present, 34 (6.2%) had a male householder with no wife present. There were 51 (9.3%) unmarried opposite-sex partnerships, and 6 (1.1%) same-sex married couples or partnerships. 170 households (31.0%) were made up of individuals, and 38 (6.9%) had someone living alone who was 65 years of age or older. The average household size was 2.20. There were 310 families (56.6% of all households); the average family size was 2.79.

The population age distribution is 234 people (19.4%) under the age of 18, 62 people (5.1%) aged 18 to 24, 292 people (24.2%) aged 25 to 44, 432 people (35.9%) aged 45 to 64, and 185 people (15.4%) who were 65 years of age or older. The median age was 45.6 years. For every 100 females, there were 106.0 males. For every 100 females age 18 and over, there were 107.9 males.

There were 623 housing units at an average density of 76.6 per square mile (29.6/km^{2}), of which 548 were occupied, of which 365 (66.6%) were owner-occupied, and 183 (33.4%) were occupied by renters. The homeowner vacancy rate was 0.8%; the rental vacancy rate was 3.1%. 872 people (72.4% of the population) lived in owner-occupied housing units and 333 people (27.6%) lived in rental housing units.

== Politics ==
In the state legislature, Westhaven-Moonstone is in the 2nd senatorial district, represented by Democrat Mike McGuire, and the 2nd Assembly district, represented by Democrat Chris Rogers.

Federally, Westhaven-Moonstone is in California's 2nd congressional district, represented by Democrat Jared Huffman.
