= Waddington, California =

Human settlement in California, US

Coordinates: 40°34′01″N 124°12′06″W

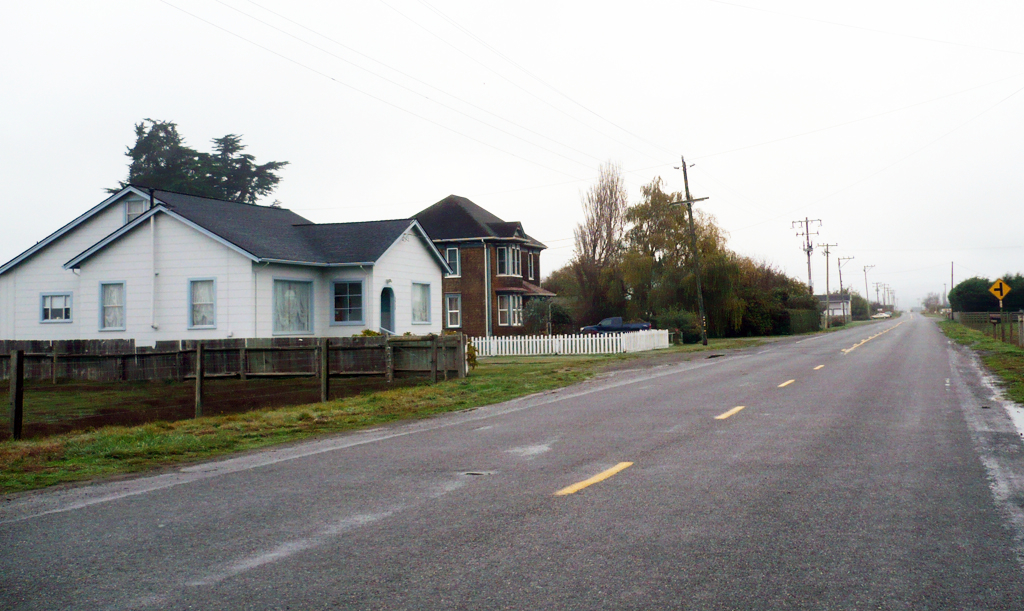
Homes in Waddington

Waddington is a populated place in Humboldt County, California, United States.

It is located on the floodplain along the south side of the Eel River 3.25 miles (5.2 km) southwest of Fortuna, at an elevation of 13 feet (4.0 m).

A post office operated at Waddington from 1891 to 1940. The name honors Alexander Waddington, a local merchant.
