= Brevard, North Carolina =

- City
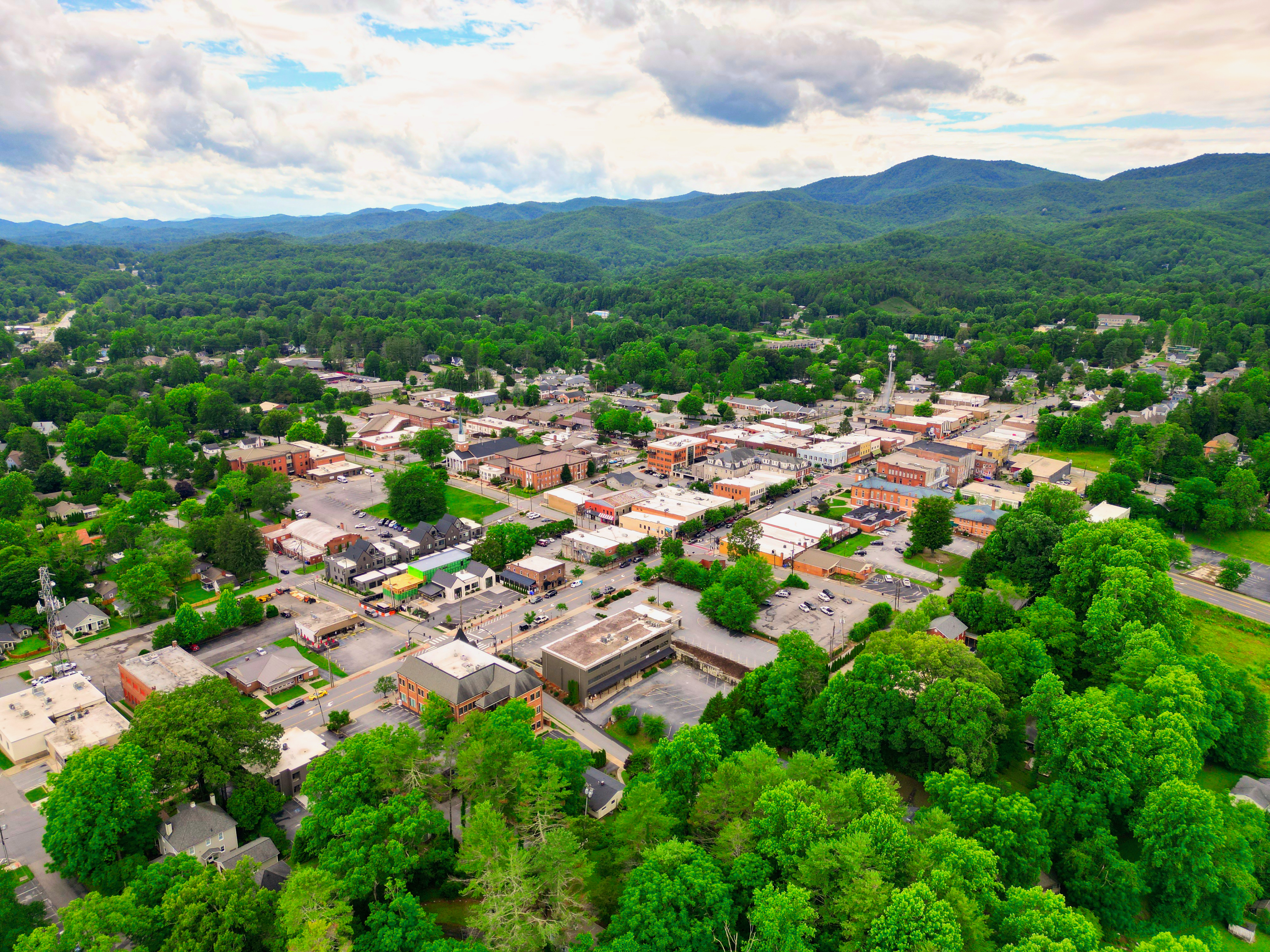
- Aerial view of downtown Brevard

- Seal

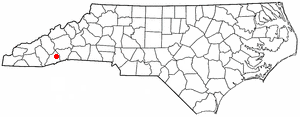
- Location of Brevard, North Carolina
- Coordinates: 35°14′38″N 82°43′35″W
- Country: United States
- State: North Carolina
- County: Transylvania
- Founded: 1861
- Incorporated: 1889
- Named after: Ephraim Brevard

Government
  - Mayor: Maureen Copelof

Area
  - Total: 5.36 sq mi (13.88 km^{2})
  - Land: 5.36 sq mi (13.87 km^{2})
  - Water: 0.0039 sq mi (0.01 km^{2})
- Elevation: 2,149 ft (655 m)

Population (2020)
  - Total: 7,744
  - Density: 1,445.6/sq mi (558.15/km^{2})
- Time zone: UTC−5 (Eastern (EST))
  - Summer (DST): UTC−4 (EDT)
- ZIP code: 28712
- Area code: 828
- FIPS code: 37-07720
- GNIS feature ID: 2403920
- Website: www.cityofbrevard.com

Brevard (/brəˈvɑːrd/ brə-VARD) is a city in and the county seat of Transylvania County, North Carolina, United States, with a population of 7,744 as of the 2020 census.

Brevard is located at the entrance to Pisgah National Forest and has become a noted tourism, retirement, and cultural center in western North Carolina. A moderate climate, environmental beauty and cultural activities attracts retirees to the area.

Brevard is also known for its white squirrels. There are several theories of how they came to live there, including an overturned carnival truck and an escaped pet breeding with native squirrels.

Along with nearby Asheville and Hendersonville, Brevard forms the Asheville-Brevard, NC CSA combined statistical area.

== History ==
According to the Transylvania Heritage Museum, the North Carolina General Assembly apportioned Transylvania County on February 15, 1861, from lands previously attributed to neighboring Jackson and Henderson counties. In the county's creation, a county seat was required to be conveniently accessible to most of the county's citizens. Its namesake was to honor Colonel Ephraim Brevard, M.D., a reputed Revolutionary War veteran.

== Geography ==
According to the United States Census Bureau, the city has a total area of 5.12 square miles, of which 0% is water.

=== Climate ===
Brevard is located in a temperate rainforest and has a climate that borders between a humid subtropical and oceanic climate and receives abundant rainfall year round due to orographic lift due to its location in the Blue Ridge Mountains and the nearby Great Balsam Mountains. It is one of the wettest towns in the US outside of the Pacific Northwest. It is also common for the town to get small amounts of snow in the winter. The town does not have any dry season, but fall gets the least amount of rain of all the seasons.

Climate data for Brevard, North Carolina (1991–2020 normals, extremes 1902–present)
| Month | Jan | Feb | Mar | Apr | May | Jun | Jul | Aug | Sep | Oct | Nov | Dec | Year |
|---|---|---|---|---|---|---|---|---|---|---|---|---|---|
| Record high °F (°C) | 85 (29) | 79 (26) | 89 (32) | 90 (32) | 96 (36) | 98 (37) | 99 (37) | 99 (37) | 97 (36) | 92 (33) | 82 (28) | 79 (26) | 99 (37) |
| Mean daily maximum °F (°C) | 48.8 (9.3) | 52.6 (11.4) | 59.7 (15.4) | 69.0 (20.6) | 75.1 (23.9) | 80.6 (27.0) | 82.8 (28.2) | 81.7 (27.6) | 76.7 (24.8) | 69.2 (20.7) | 59.1 (15.1) | 51.0 (10.6) | 67.2 (19.6) |
| Daily mean °F (°C) | 37.0 (2.8) | 39.9 (4.4) | 46.5 (8.1) | 55.0 (12.8) | 62.5 (16.9) | 69.5 (20.8) | 72.5 (22.5) | 71.7 (22.1) | 66.0 (18.9) | 56.3 (13.5) | 45.7 (7.6) | 39.3 (4.1) | 55.2 (12.9) |
| Mean daily minimum °F (°C) | 25.2 (−3.8) | 27.3 (−2.6) | 33.2 (0.7) | 40.9 (4.9) | 50.0 (10.0) | 58.3 (14.6) | 62.2 (16.8) | 61.7 (16.5) | 55.4 (13.0) | 43.4 (6.3) | 32.2 (0.1) | 27.7 (−2.4) | 43.1 (6.2) |
| Record low °F (°C) | −15 (−26) | −20 (−29) | −2 (−19) | 14 (−10) | 25 (−4) | 31 (−1) | 41 (5) | 33 (1) | 29 (−2) | 15 (−9) | 2 (−17) | −12 (−24) | −20 (−29) |
| Average precipitation inches (mm) | 6.98 (177) | 5.38 (137) | 5.88 (149) | 5.83 (148) | 5.63 (143) | 6.83 (173) | 6.30 (160) | 7.56 (192) | 6.07 (154) | 6.15 (156) | 5.87 (149) | 7.09 (180) | 75.57 (1,919) |
| Average snowfall inches (cm) | 1.7 (4.3) | 1.4 (3.6) | 0.8 (2.0) | 0.0 (0.0) | 0.0 (0.0) | 0.0 (0.0) | 0.0 (0.0) | 0.0 (0.0) | 0.0 (0.0) | 0.0 (0.0) | 0.2 (0.51) | 3.0 (7.6) | 7.1 (18) |
| Average precipitation days (≥ 0.01 in) | 9.8 | 9.5 | 12.1 | 10.6 | 11.6 | 14.2 | 15.3 | 14.4 | 10.0 | 8.4 | 8.1 | 10.6 | 134.6 |
| Average snowy days (≥ 0.1 in) | 0.6 | 0.6 | 0.2 | 0.0 | 0.0 | 0.0 | 0.0 | 0.0 | 0.0 | 0.0 | 0.0 | 0.6 | 2.0 |
Source: NOAA

== Demographics ==
Historical population
| Census | Pop. | Note | %± |
|---|---|---|---|
| 1880 | 223 | | — |
| 1890 | 327 | | 46.6% |
| 1900 | 584 | | 78.6% |
| 1910 | 919 | | 57.4% |
| 1920 | 1,658 | | 80.4% |
| 1930 | 2,339 | | 41.1% |
| 1940 | 3,061 | | 30.9% |
| 1950 | 3,908 | | 27.7% |
| 1960 | 4,857 | | 24.3% |
| 1970 | 5,243 | | 7.9% |
| 1980 | 5,323 | | 1.5% |
| 1990 | 5,388 | | 1.2% |
| 2000 | 6,789 | | 26.0% |
| 2010 | 7,609 | | 12.1% |
| 2020 | 7,744 | | 1.8% |
| 2025 (est.) | 8,098 | ▲ | 4.6% |
U.S. Decennial Census

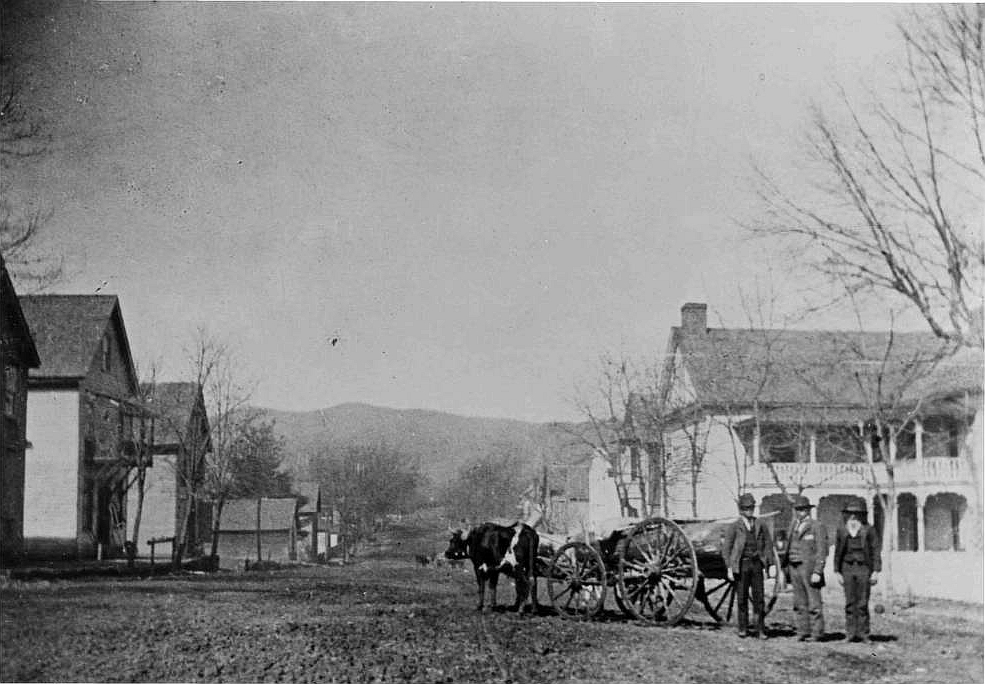
West Main Street in Brevard, circa 1886

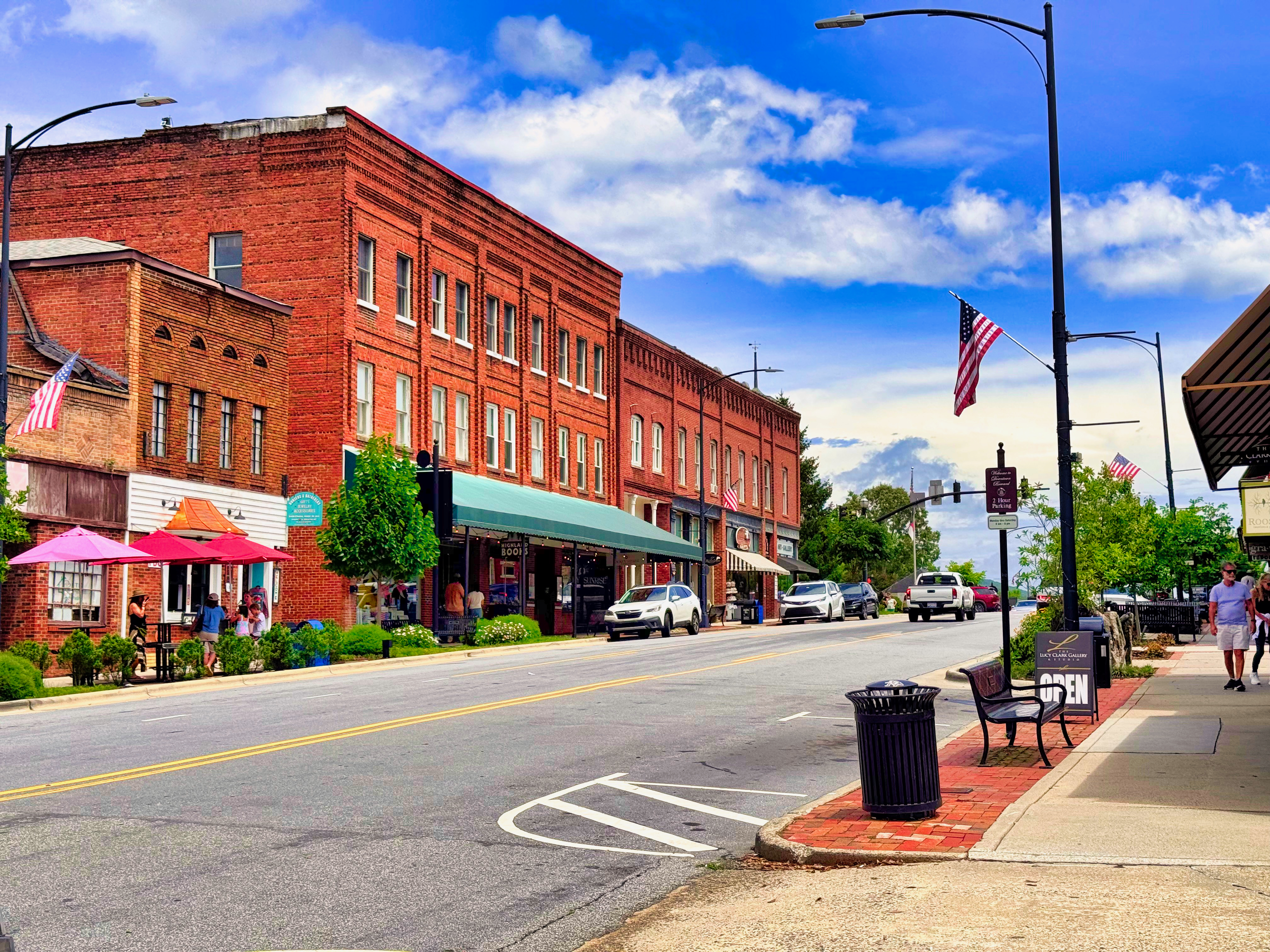
Downtown Brevard

=== 2020 census ===
Brevard racial composition
| Race | Number | Percentage |
|---|---|---|
| White (non-Hispanic) | 6,140 | 79.29% |
| Black or African American (non-Hispanic) | 677 | 8.74% |
| Native American | 25 | 0.32% |
| Asian | 75 | 0.97% |
| Pacific Islander | 15 | 0.19% |
| Other/Mixed | 386 | 4.98% |
| Hispanic or Latino | 426 | 5.5% |

As of the 2020 census, Brevard had a population of 7,744. The median age was 46.7 years. 16.5% of residents were under the age of 18 and 30.4% of residents were 65 years of age or older. For every 100 females there were 81.3 males, and for every 100 females age 18 and over there were 77.2 males age 18 and over.

98.2% of residents lived in urban areas, while 1.8% lived in rural areas.

There were 3,427 households in Brevard, including 2,005 families, and 20.9% of households had children under the age of 18 living in them. Of all households, 36.9% were married-couple households, 17.6% were households with a male householder and no spouse or partner present, and 39.7% were households with a female householder and no spouse or partner present. About 40.3% of all households were made up of individuals and 23.4% had someone living alone who was 65 years of age or older.

There were 3,935 housing units, of which 12.9% were vacant. The homeowner vacancy rate was 1.9% and the rental vacancy rate was 5.9%.

=== 2010 census ===
As of the census of 2010, there were 7,609 people, 3,253 households, and 1,711 families residing in the city. The population density was 1,486 inhabitants per square mile (574/km^{2}). The racial makeup of the city was 83.3% White, 11.0% African American, 0.3% Native American, 1.0% Asian, 0.07%, 0.46% from other races, and 2.7% from two or more races. Hispanic or Latino of any race were 3.7% of the population.

There were 2,826 households, out of which 21.8% had children under the age of 18 living with them, 44.2% were married couples living together, 13.3% had a female householder with no husband present, and 39.9% were non-families. 36.0% of all households were made up of individuals, and 18.9% had someone living alone who was 65 years of age or older. The average household size was 2.12, and the average family size was 2.73.

The population was distributed broadly among different age groups, with 18.3% under the age of 18, 12.3% from 18 to 24, 19.9% from 25 to 44, 21.3% from 45 to 64, and 28.2% who were 65 years of age or older. The median age was 45 years. For every 100 females, there were 79.3 males. For every 100 females age 18 and over, there were 73.4 males.

The median income for a household in the city was $33,497, and the median income for a family was $44,489. Males had a median income of $26,929 versus $21,348 for females. The per capita income for the city was $18,256. About 7.61% of families and 10.7% of the population were below the poverty line, including 17.0% of those under age 18 and 5.9% of those age 65 or over.

== Arts and culture ==
White Squirrel Festival takes place on the Friday, Saturday, and Sunday preceding Memorial Day. It features the white Squirrel, Pisgah Pete, live music, arts & crafts, and food. The white variant of the eastern gray squirrel (Sciurus carolinensis) is commonly seen around Brevard.

Independence Day is a major event in Brevard. The celebrations include an annual fireworks display and a car judging competition. Streets downtown are blocked off for a festival including games, arts and crafts, concerts and food vendors.

Halloweenfest takes place on the last Saturday of October in downtown Brevard. Brevard is located in Transylvania County and it shows up in the enthusiasm seen in the costumes during the event. Live music, other street performers, arts & crafts, Flight of the Vampires 5K Run, pet costume contest, haunted house, ghost tour, and other activities happen all day.

Twilight Tour: Early in the morning runners come out for the Reindeer Run 5K Run. Street vendors appear in the afternoon after downtown is closed to traffic. The Christmas Parade proceeds down South Broad Street around 3pm, starting at Brevard High School and ending at Brevard College. After the parade, Twilight Tour takes place with, horse-drawn carriages, luminaries, seasonal music, and food in the many downtown shops & restaurants.

== Education ==
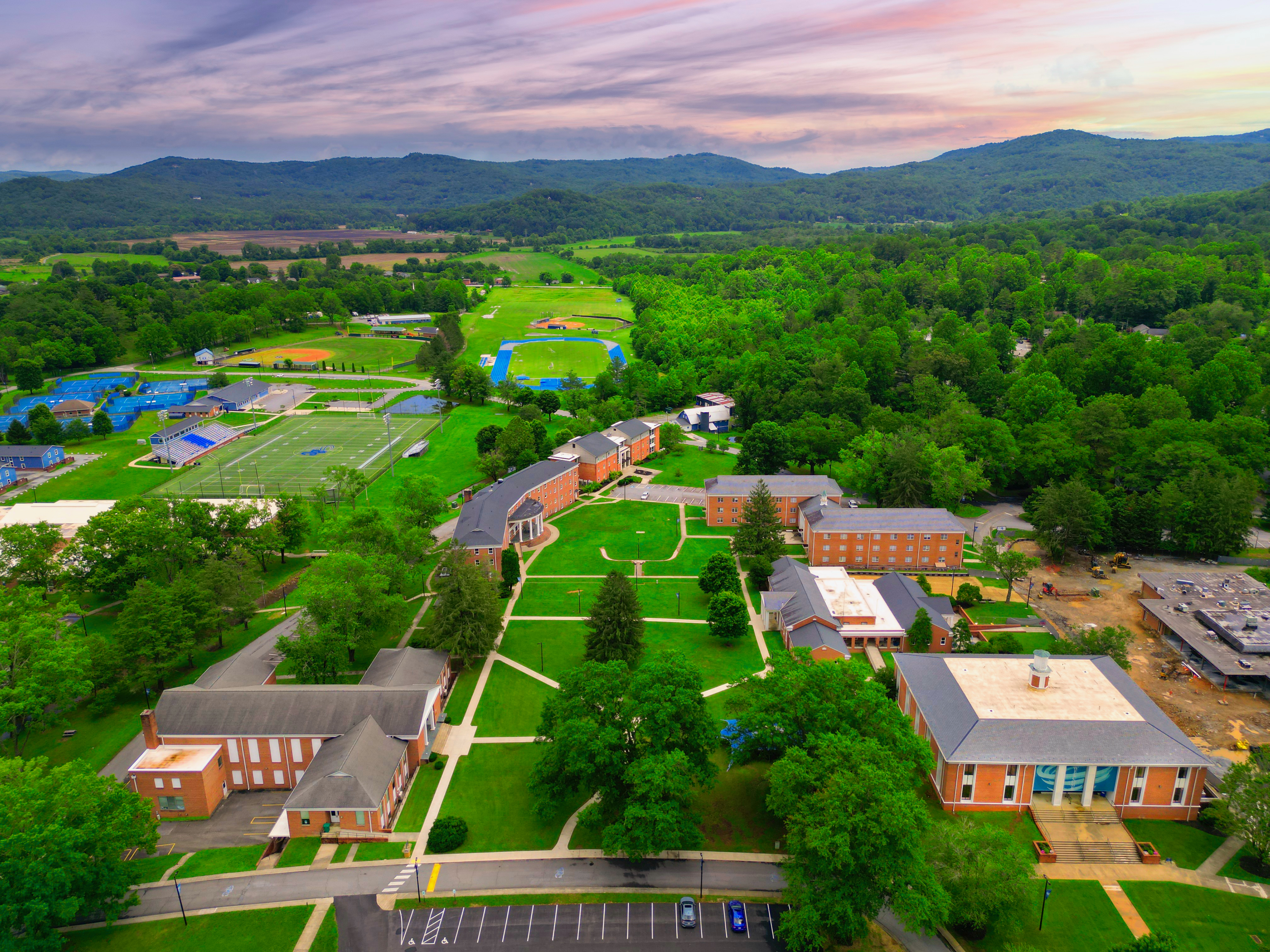
Brevard College campus

Aerial of the Brevard College campus in Transylvania County, North Carolina

Transylvania County Schools has two public high schools: Brevard High School and Rosman High School. The system also has an alternative high school in Davidson River School. There are four elementary schools and two middle schools. There is also one charter school, Brevard Academy, and several smaller private schools.

Brevard College, a four-year liberal arts institution, is located in Brevard.

The town is also home to the Brevard Music Center, and to a campus of the Blue Ridge Community College.

During the summer Brevard holds a distance runners camp at Brevard College.

== Notable people ==
- Kevin S. Brown (born 1968) — Episcopal bishop of Delaware
- Joseph R. Bryson (1893–1953) — member of U.S. House of Representatives
- Gil Coan (1922–2020) — Major League Baseball outfielder
- Spencer Fisher (born 1976) — mixed martial artist
- Courtney W. Hamlin (1858–1950) — member of U.S. House of Representatives
- James A. Hefner (1941–2015) — former president, Tennessee State University (son of Art Hefner)
- Clifford B. Hicks (1920–2010) — author
- Allen Hunt (born 1964) — radio personality
- Randy Johnson (1944–2009) — football player
- Moms Mabley (1894–1975) — stand-up comedian
- Mickey Marvin (1955–2017) — football player, Oakland/Los Angeles Raiders
- Cliff Melton (1912–1986) — Major League Baseball pitcher
- Lauren Myracle (born 1969) — author
- James Champlin "Champ" Osteen (1877–1962) — Major League baseball infielder
- Woody Platt — bluegrass musician
- Marie M. Runyon (1915–2018) — activist and politician
- O. K. Smathers (1914–1997) — world champion archer
- Charles H. Taylor (born 1941) — former member of U.S. House of Representatives
- Charles O'Rear (born 1941) — photographer of Bliss, the default wallpaper of Windows XP

== Sister city ==
Brevard has one sister city, as designated by Sister Cities International:

- Pietroasa, Bihor, Romania

== See also ==
- Biltmore Forest School
- Brevard County, Florida
