= Whiskey Springs, California =

Unincorporated community in California, United States

Whiskey Springs
- Unincorporated community
- Location in California Whiskey Springs (the United States)
- Coordinates: 39°21′48″N 123°40′00″W
- Country: United States
- State: California
- County: Mendocino
- Elevation: 600 ft (183 m)

Whiskey Springs is an unincorporated community in Mendocino County, California, United States. It is located 8 miles (13 km) north-northwest of Comptche, at an elevation of 600 feet (183 m). The location was named by teamsters stopping there during trips between the coast and interior. In 1936, a fire suppression camp consisting of temporary structures was built at the site. The camp was constructed by the Civilian Conservation Corps. As of 1936, the spring itself provided a year-round flow of water. In 1974, the United States Forest Service conducted redwood regeneration tests at Whiskey Springs.
