= West Butte, California =

Unincorporated community in California, United States

West Butte
- Unincorporated community
- Location in California West Butte (the United States)
- Coordinates: 39°11′14″N 121°53′17″W
- Country: United States
- State: California
- County: Sutter County
- Elevation: 85 ft (26 m)

West Butte (formerly, Westbutte) is an unincorporated community in Sutter County, California, 3.25 miles (5.23 km) north-northeast of Meridian. It lies at an elevation of 85 feet (26 m). A post office operated at West Butte from 1863 to 1930.
