= Willow Valley, California =

Unincorporated community in California, United States

Willow Valley
- Unincorporated community
- Location in California Willow Valley (the United States)
- Coordinates: 39°16′19″N 120°58′55″W
- Country: United States
- State: California
- County: Nevada County
- Elevation: 2,746 ft (837 m)

Willow Valley is an unincorporated community in Nevada County, California. Willow Valley is located 6.5 miles (10.5 km) south-southwest of North Bloomfield. It lies at an elevation of 2746 feet (837 m).

== Education ==
The Willow Valley school district was annexed into nearby Nevada City, California in the early 1930s.

== Economy ==
Willow Valley was an area of gold and quartz production. Willow Valley Mining bought several gold mines in the vicinity in 1950.
