= Waseck, California =

Coordinates: 41°13′00″N 123°45′19″W

Waseck (Yurok: Wahsekw) is a locality in Humboldt County, California. It is located adjacent to Martins Ferry on the Klamath River, at an elevation of 850 feet (260 m).
