= Wolf, California =

Unincorporated community in California, United States

Wolf
- Unincorporated community
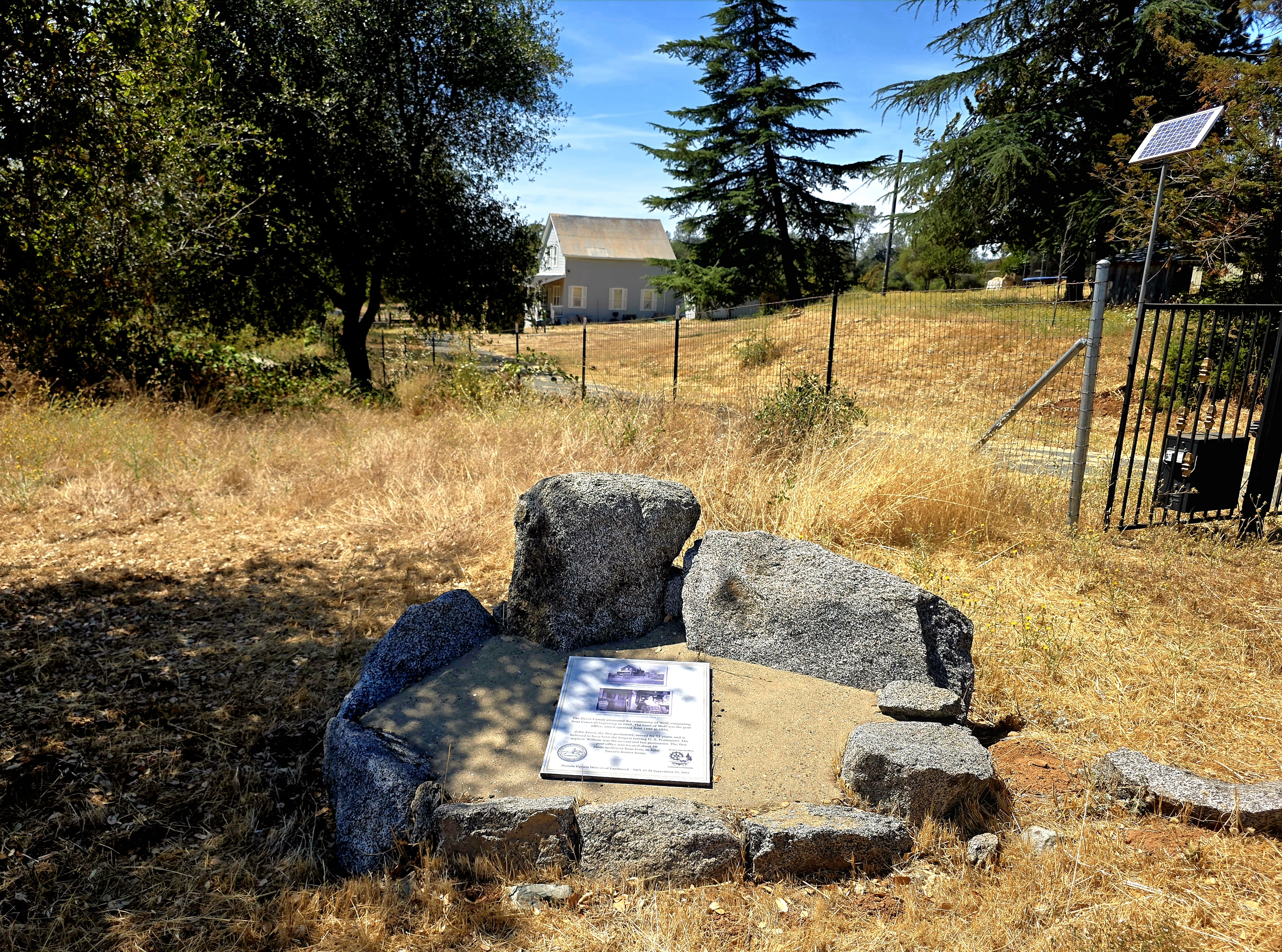
- Historic monument at the site of Wolf, California

- Location in California Wolf (the United States)
- Coordinates: 39°03′31″N 121°08′18″W
- Country: United States
- State: California
- County: Nevada County
- Elevation: 1,578 ft (481 m)

Wolf is a historic agricultural community in the western part of Nevada County. It lies about 12 miles south of Grass Valley at an elevation of 1578 feet. It is centered around the intersection of present day Wolf and Garden Bar roads.

The Wolf District, as it was originally called, was named for Wolf Creek, which runs through the area. Wolf Creek reportedly was named in 1849 by miners who camped by the creek and saw wolves fighting over the remains of a cow they had slaughtered. The name appears to have been shortened to Wolf with the establishment of a post office in 1888.

Farmers and ranchers begin moving into the area in the 1860s, gradually supplanting the early miners. Among the earliest settlers was Jackson B. Underwood. In 1869, William Sweet, an immigrant from Cornwall, bought Underwood's 200 acres and began expanding it. In 1871, William's wife Katherine and their five children arrived. William was killed in a confrontation with a neighboring rancher in 1872. Descendants of William and Katherine still own substantial ranches around Wolf.

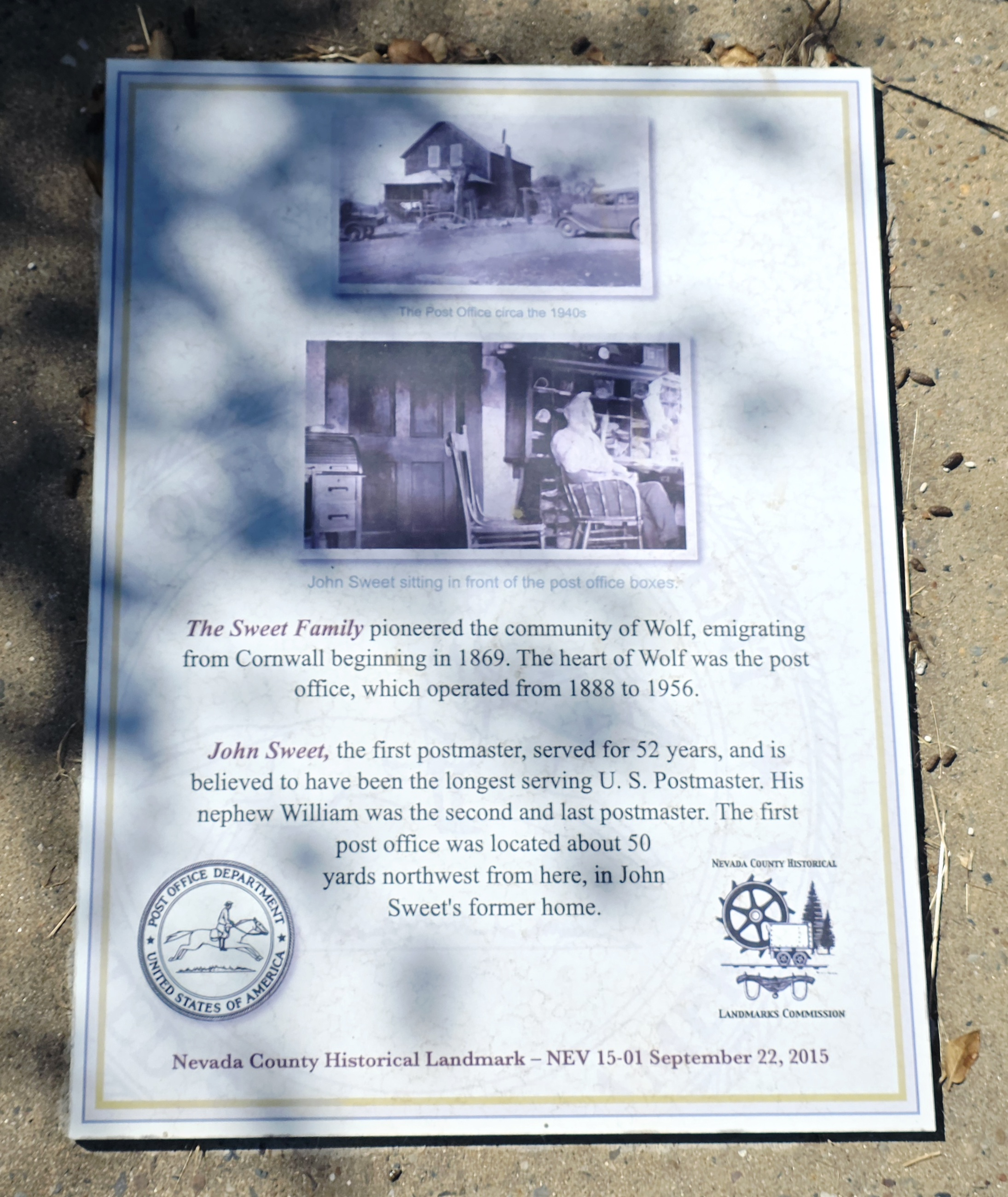
Wolf, California monument plaque

The population of the area continued to increase and in 1888, a post office was established in Wolf. On August 24, 1888, one of William's sons, John Sweet, became postmaster. John Sweet operated the post office from the living room of his ranch house, located just west of the intersection of Wolf and Garden Bar roads. The post office became a sort of community center, and at one point served about 75 residents. Beginning in 1891, the community also had its own school. In 1890, it reportedly had Methodist and Christian churches.

John Sweet served as Wolf postmaster until February 19, 1940, and was reportedly the longest serving US postmaster. His nephew W.B. Sweet took over as postmaster and built a small building on his ranch about 1/2 mile south of John's ranch to house the post office. By 1956, with only 2 other residents still using the post office, it was decommissioned at the postmaster's request. The second post office building was moved close to the intersection of Wolf and Garden Bar, where it remains.

A few historic buildings remain in the area, which now features agriculture, ranching and horse breeding.
