= Whisky Falls, California =

Unincorporated community in California, United States

Whisky Falls
- Unincorporated community
- Location in California Whisky Falls (the United States)
- Coordinates: 37°17′13″N 119°26′21″W
- Country: United States
- State: California
- County: Madera
- Elevation: 5,912 ft (1,802 m)

Whisky Falls (formerly Whiskey Falls) is an unincorporated area of Madera County, California, United States. It is located 4.5 miles (7.2 km) south of Shuteye Peak, at an elevation of 5,912 feet (1802 m).

In the early 1900s, author Stewart Edward White built a cabin on Peckinpah Mountain near the old mill near Whiskey Falls, and wrote about the experience in The Cabin. In 2019, U.S. Attorney McGregor W. Scott took a tour of an illegal marijuana farm in Whiskey Falls, in the Sierra National Forest.
