= Whitesboro, California =

Unincorporated community in California, United States

Whitesboro
- Unincorporated community
- Location in California Whitesboro (the United States)
- Coordinates: 39°12′53″N 123°45′52″W
- Country: United States
- State: California
- County: Mendocino
- Elevation: 39 ft (12 m)

Whitesboro was an unincorporated community in Mendocino County, California, United States. It was located 1 mile (1.6 km) south-southeast of Albion, at an elevation of 39 feet (12 m).

The name was bestowed in 1876 after L. E. White, the major owner of the Salmon Creek Mill Company. A post office operated at Whitesboro from 1881 to 1899. Almost no trace of the former sawmill town remains as of 2010, but there is still a functioning Whitesboro Grange hall located on nearby Navarro Ridge Road.

== Images ==
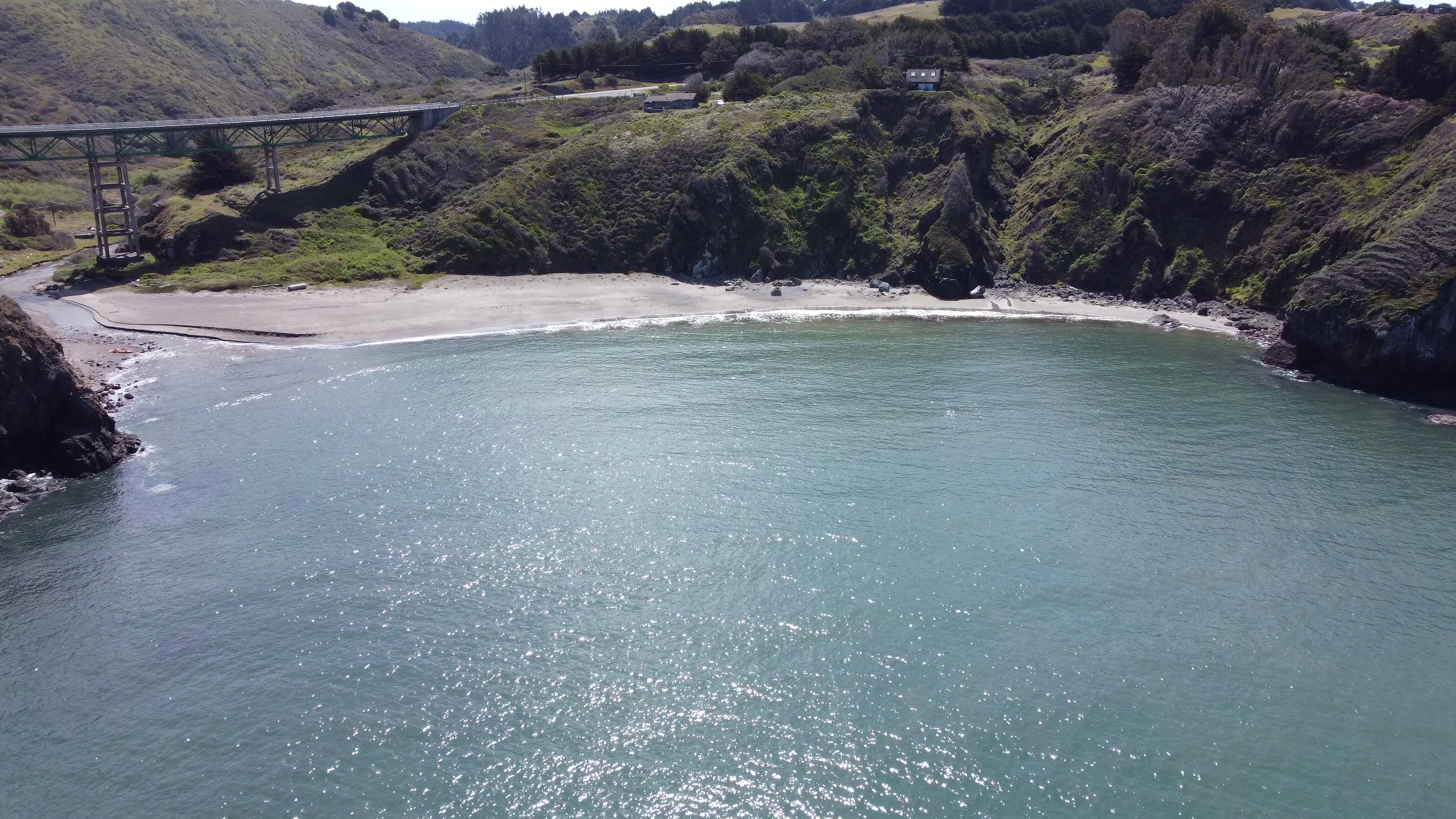
Whitesboro Cove, Whitesboro, California

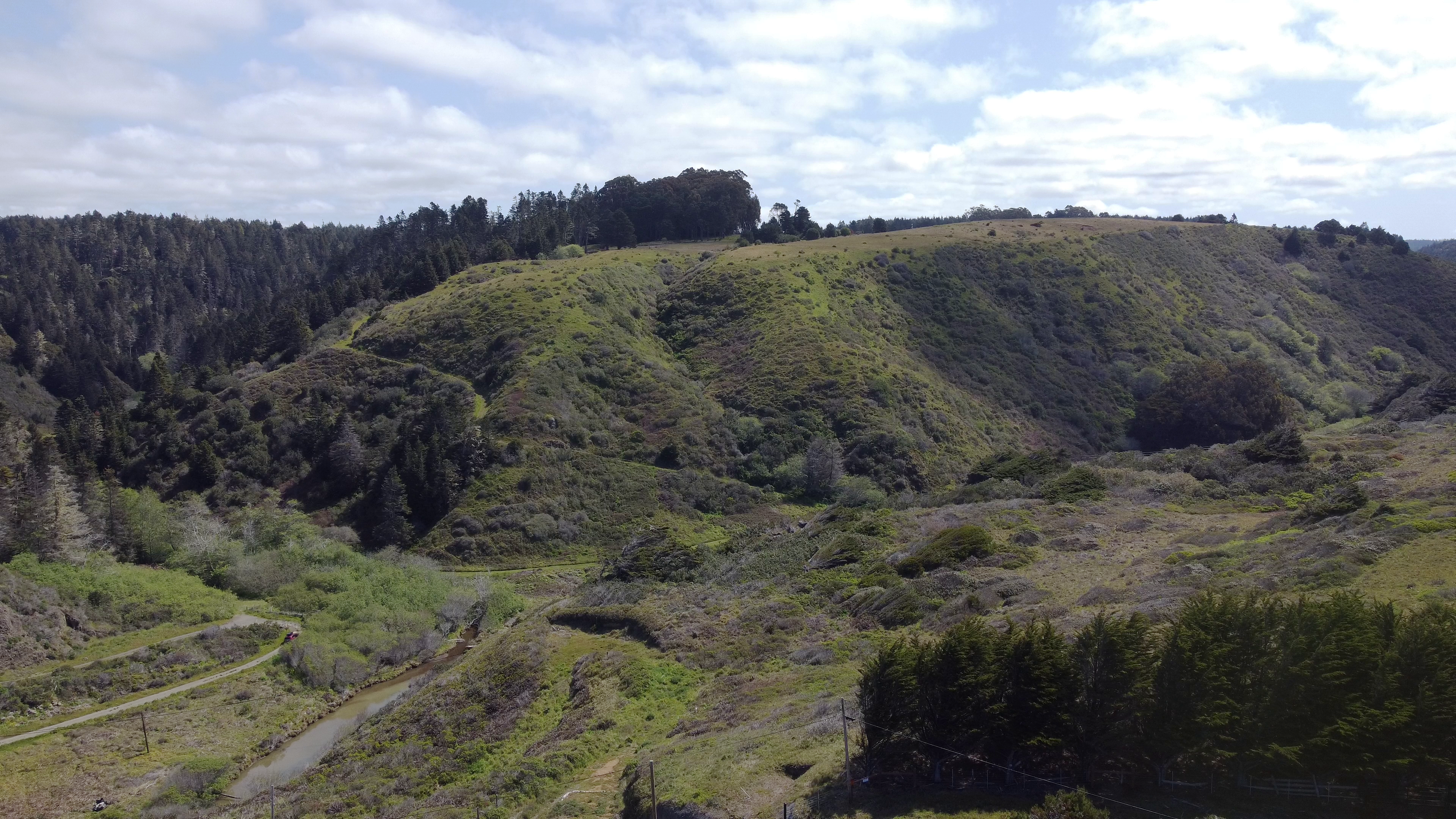
The location of the old Whitesboro CA town

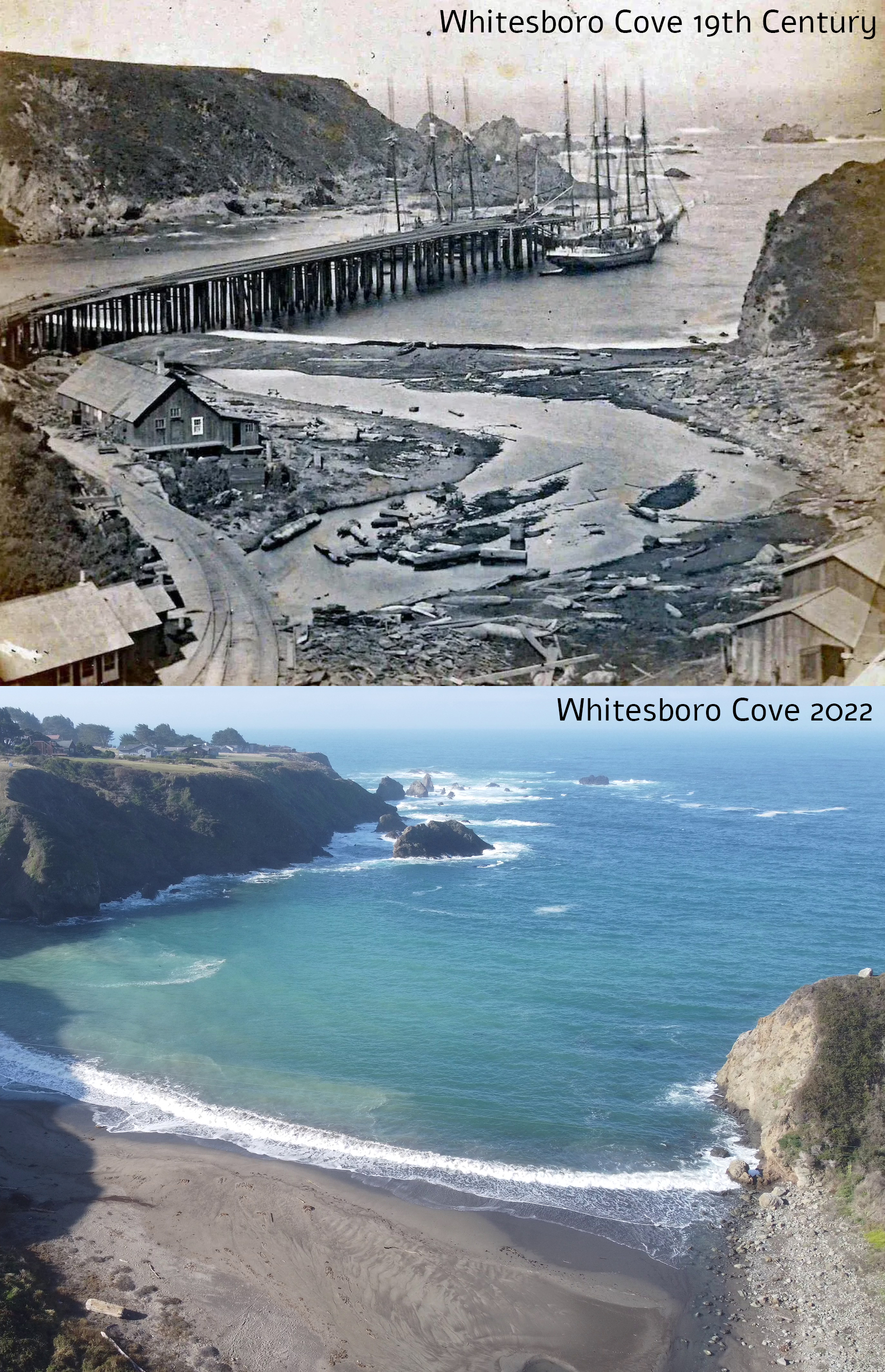
Whitesboro Cove in the late 19th century, and in 2022.

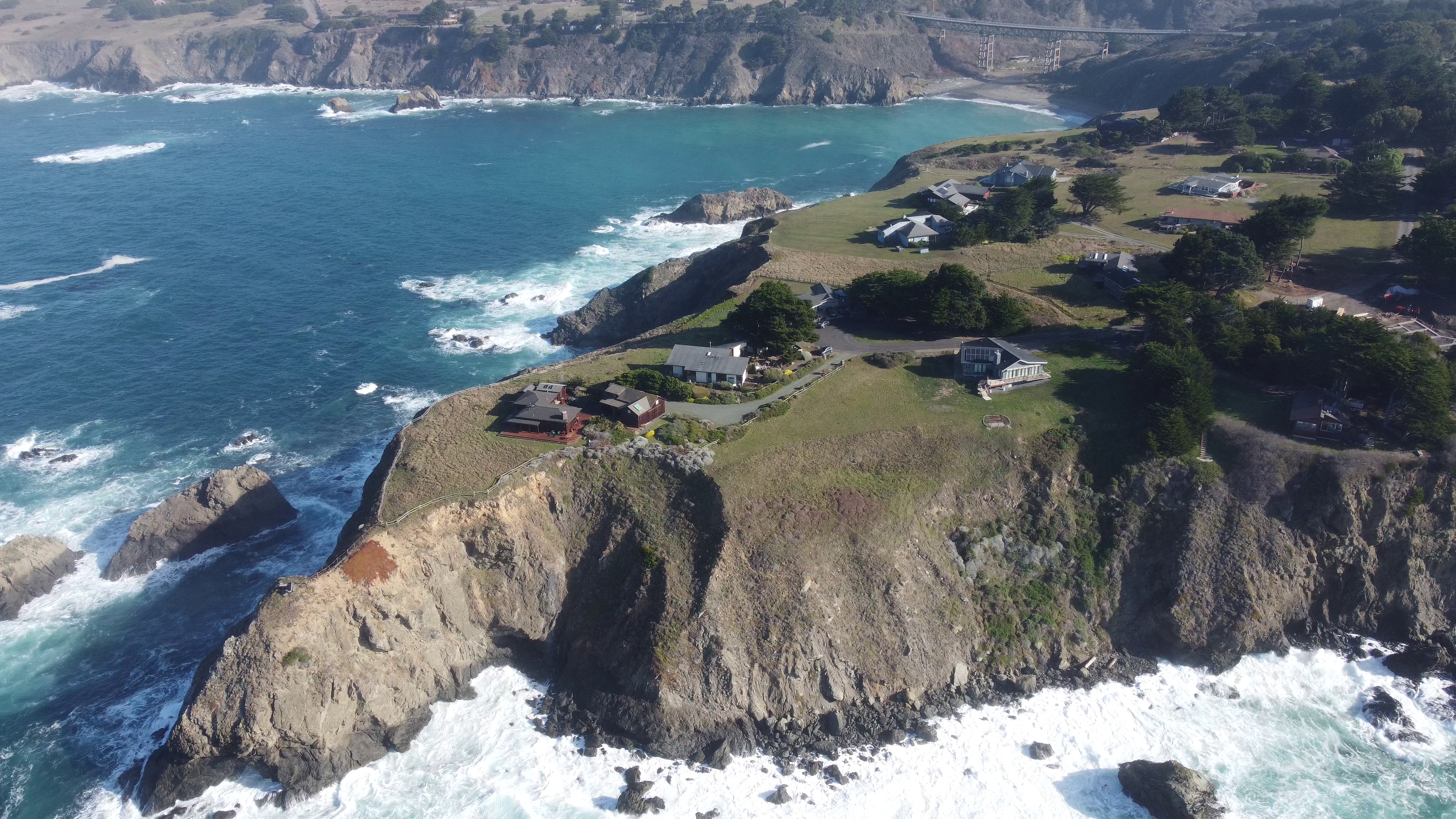
Stunning view of Salmon Point, the outer tip of the Whitesboro Cove on the south side

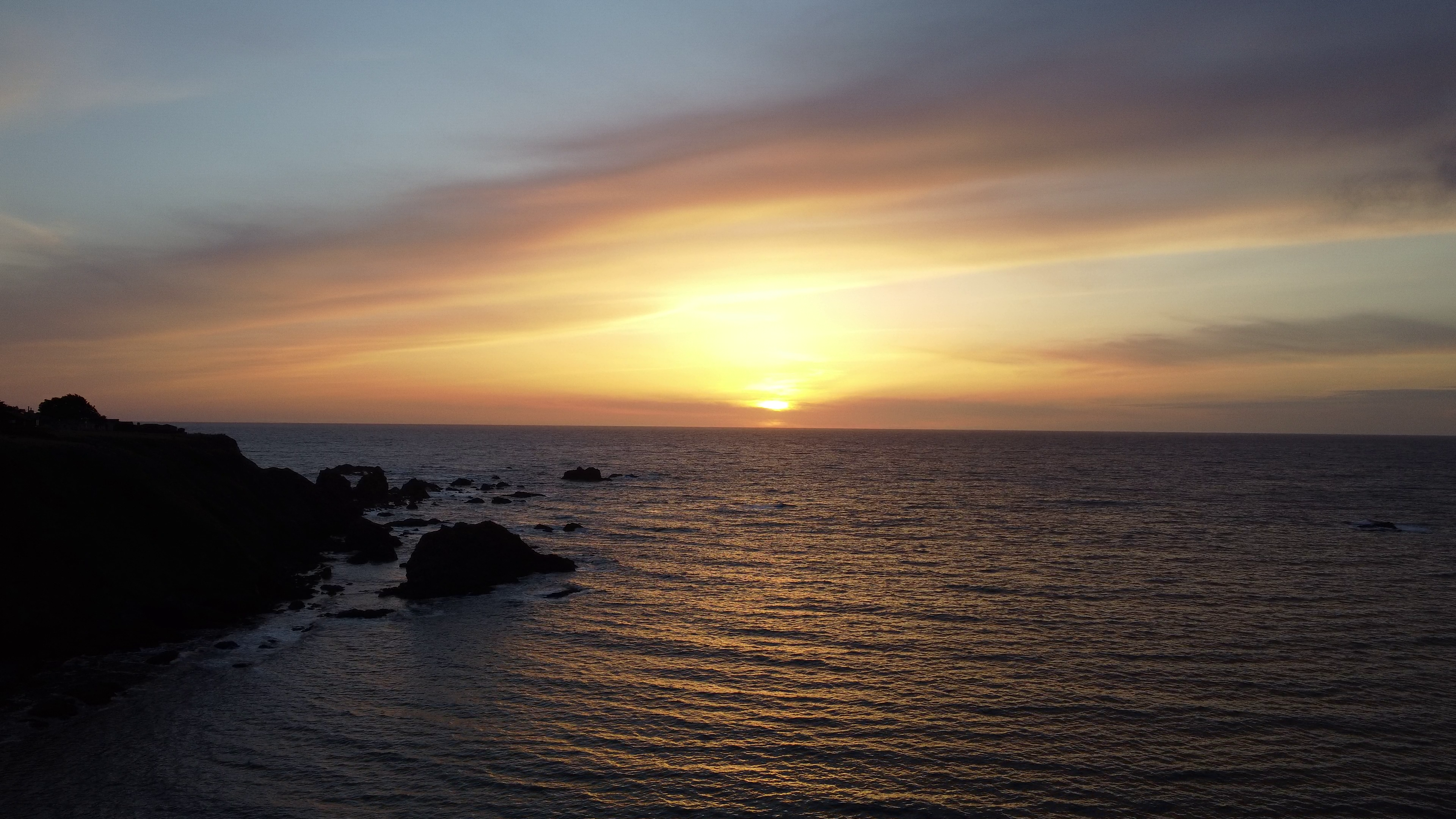
Sunset over Whitesboro Cove
