= Walteria, Torrance =

Neighborhood in Southern California, United States

Coordinates: 33°48′18″N 118°21′04″W

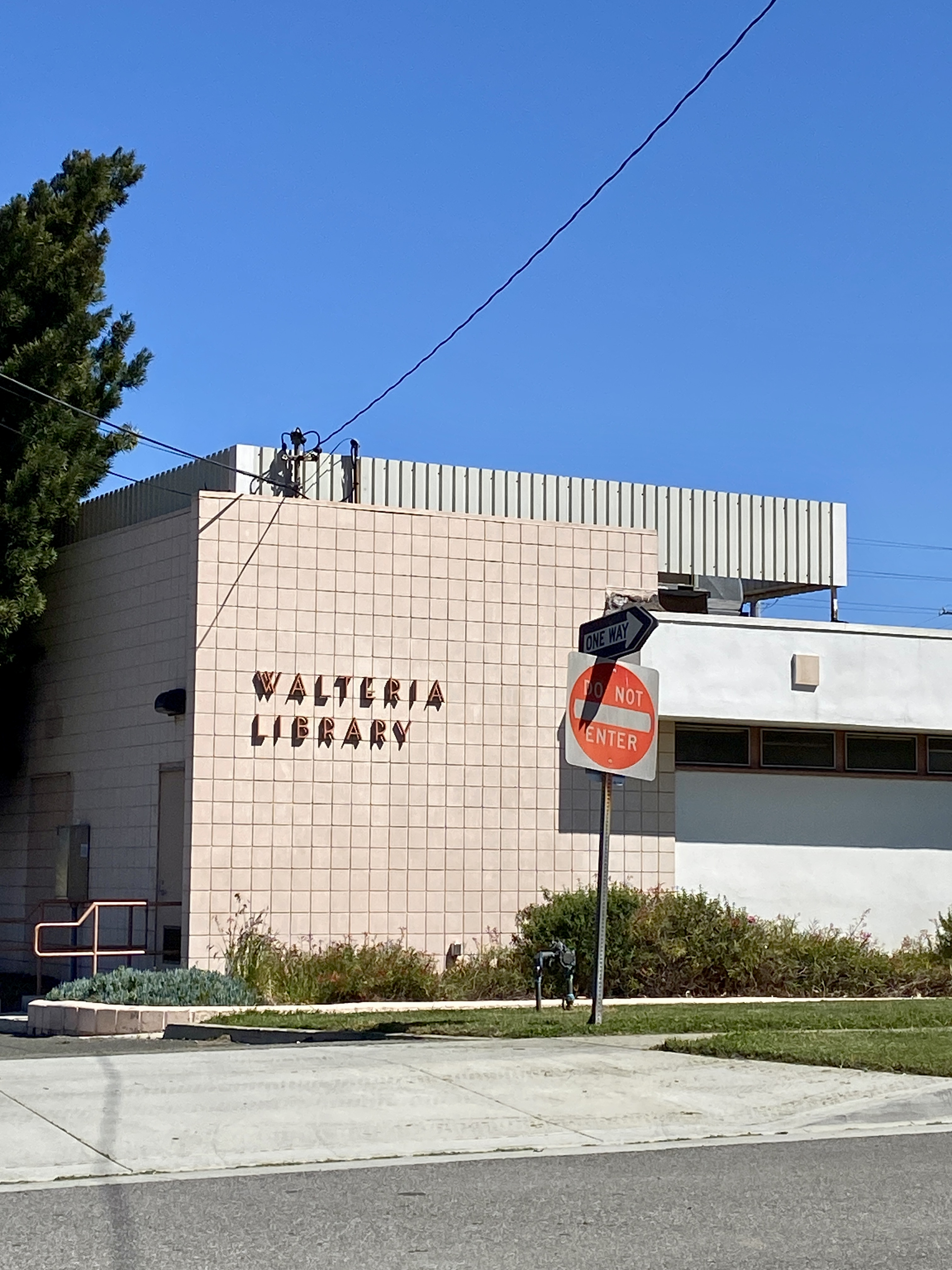
Walteria branch, Torrance Public Library, Los Angeles County, California

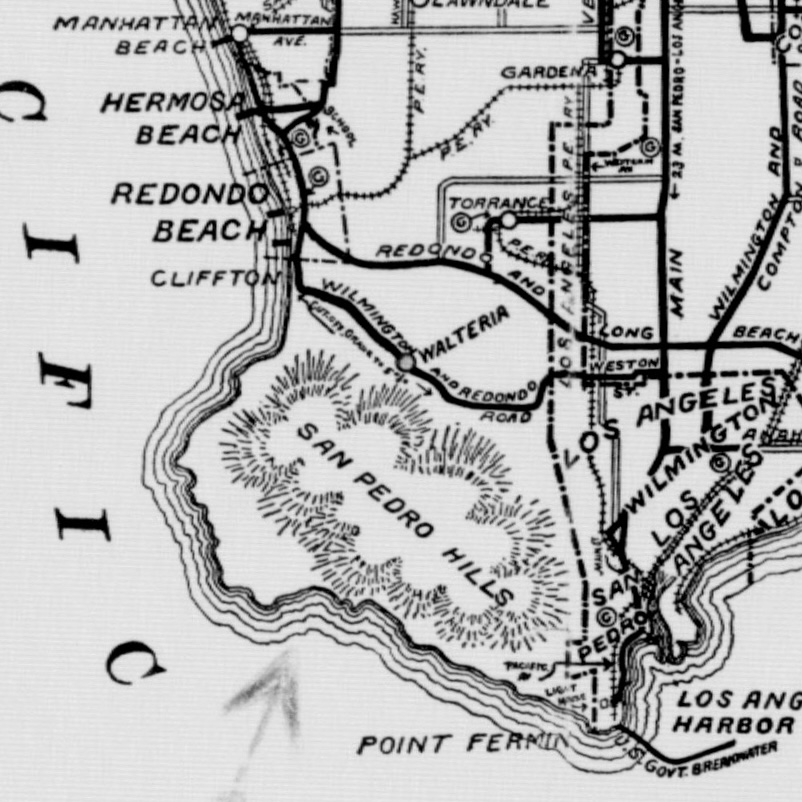
Walteria on a 1904 map of Los Angeles County

Walteria is a neighborhood in south Torrance in southern California, United States. It is bounded by Crenshaw Boulevard on the east, Pacific Coast Highway on the north, Vista Montana to the west; and approximately Newton Street, Blair Way, Winlock Road and Rolling Hills Way to the south. The local zip code is 90505.

== History ==
=== 19th century ===
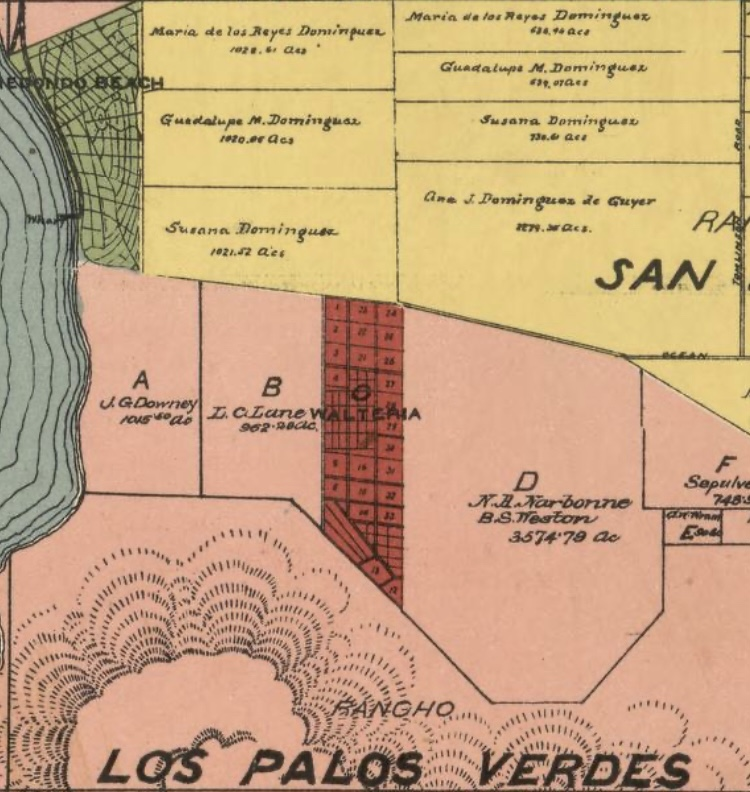
The paper town of Walteria in 1888

The area that came to be known as Walteria was once part of Rancho Palos Verdes. According to Historic Spots in California, a location just southeast of Walteria was likely the location of the José Dolores Sepúlveda Adobe, built in approximately 1818: "The exact site is unknown, but the general area is indicated by old pepper trees at the mouth of the canyon into which Madison Street runs."Mapping L.A.

On July 21, 1874, a man named Ben S. Weston bought 3,000 acres (1,200 ha; 4.7 mi^{2}) acres of the old rancho for $5,250. Weston's land included what is now Torrance Airport and was "bordered by what is now Madison on the west, Sepulveda Boulevard to the north, the Lomita line on the east, and the Palos Verdes foothills to the south." According to a 1968 history of the settlement:

The yearly round-up of cattle ended in the corrals at Pacific Coast Highway and Crenshaw Boulevard. The few youngsters who attended school on the Weston ranch did their figures to the sounds of cattle lowing in the corrals during branding season. Ben Weston's house, which was built in 1847 is still used as a residence in Walteria.

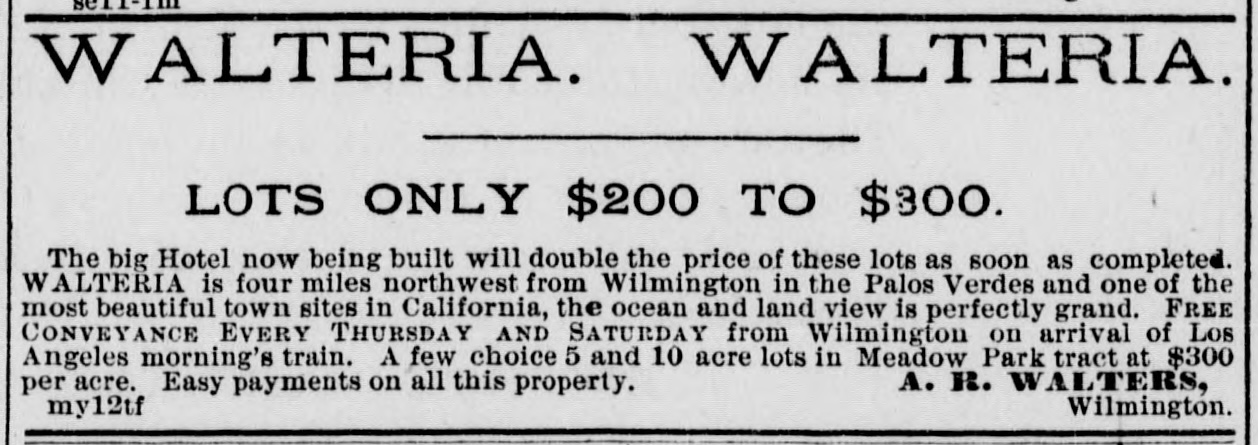
Walteria marketing, 1887

Walteria is named after Captain A. Richard Walters of Atkinson, Illinois. Walters moved to the California farming area in the 1880s and built a stagecoach stop on the Redondo–Wilmington road connecting the salt works in Redondo Beach with the harbor in San Pedro. In 1888, real estate developers advertised Walteria as a subdivision of Meadow Park that offered "pure air and delightful scenery" to potential buyers. The name was apparently because "developers recognized the pleasing quality of the Spanish language. They named their subdivision either a truly Moorish Alhambra, a Spanish-sounding Moneta, or simply gave it a Spanish ending as in Walteria." According to a 1949 history of Rancho Palos Verdes, "On the northern side of the ranch, abortive cities of grand scale [were] plotted, including the subdivision named Walteria on the property of [N. A.] Narbonne and Weston. Attractive as the plans appeared, the construction of these works was not consummated before the collapse of the boom, so the ranch lands remained planted in grain and devoted to grazing of sheep, except for a few scattered sales in the different tracts, and the growing San Pedro town. Walteria is little more than a name on today's map." One 1890 account described Walteria as one of 60 paper towns laid out in the Greater Los Angeles era in 1887–88 but not substantially built: "The plowshare has passed over their ruins, and barley grows in their deserted streets."

=== 20th century ===
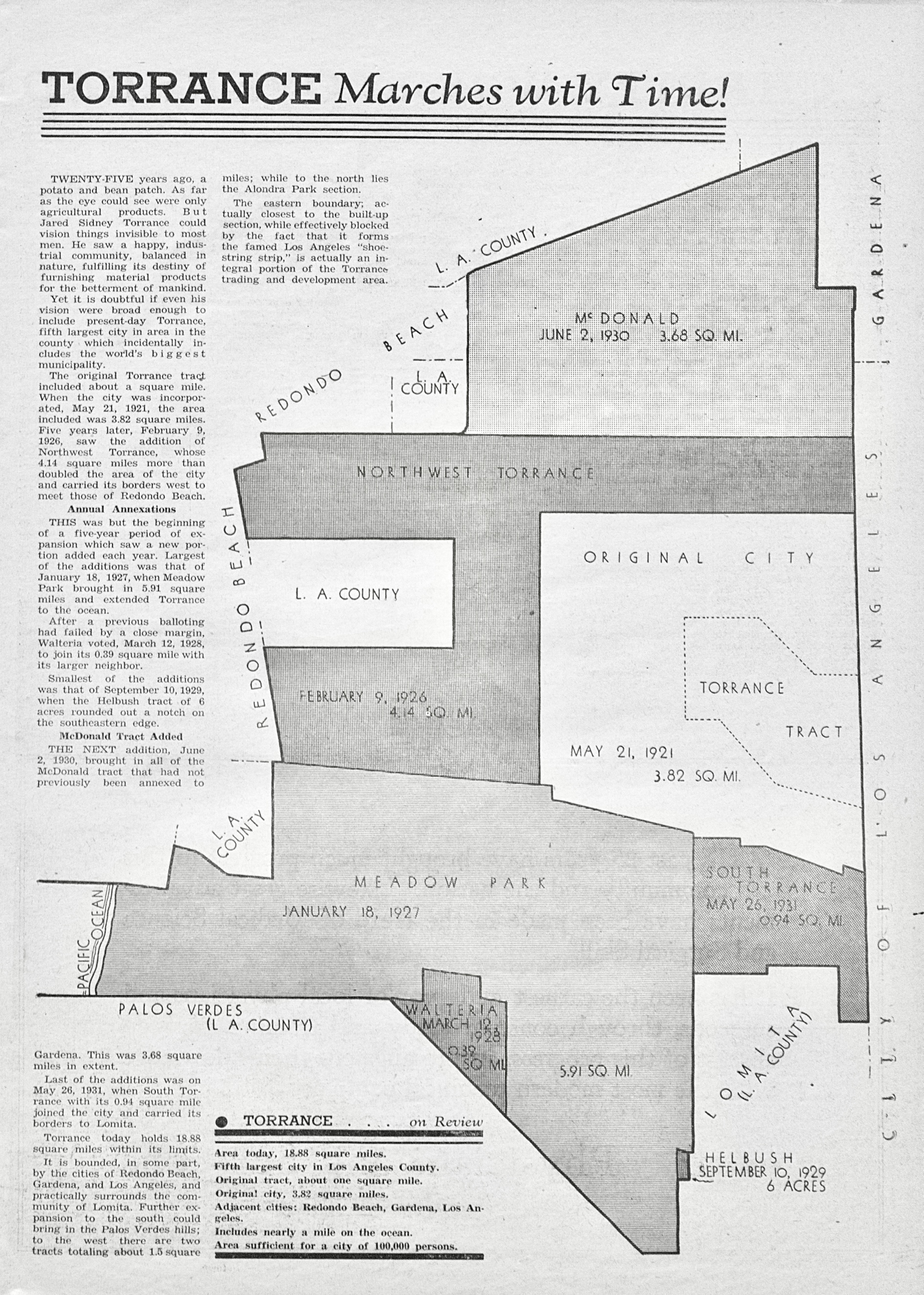
Map of Torrance annexations

Oil was discovered on the Kettler ranch in 1924 and there were ultimately 48 wells on the site. Walteria was formally annexed to the city of Torrance, California on March 12, 1928. In 1929 the Walteria post office became a branch of the Torrance office, perhaps in part because the Walteria postmaster had been convicted of embezzling $1,200 in funds from the post office department. The Walteria branch of the Torrance library system first opened in 1937. The first location of the Walteria library was an old army barracks. During World War II, a citizens committee worked to supply the library with books in honor of the 111 people from Walteria serving the armed forces. The library moved around and operated at a number of locations until it moved into a dedicated building in 1962.

Residents are zoned to Walteria Elementary School, Richardson Middle School, and South High School. The first Walteria School building was heavily damaged by a 1941 earthquake. There were five sets of twins enrolled at Walteria Elementary in 1949.

There was a substantial Japanese-American community in Walteria before World War II. According to a post-war history, "Japanese families had farmed on surrounding acreage for years. Their children went to school apart from the Anglo children at the 'Japanese School.' Eventually, the Japanese families took over most of the farm lands in Walteria, and thrived until World War II. Under Governor Earl Warren's administration during the Second World War, the Japanese were removed from their land. Mexican nationals were brought in to farm the land, however agriculture in the area began to decline at this time. Very few of the Japanese families returned to Walteria following the war."

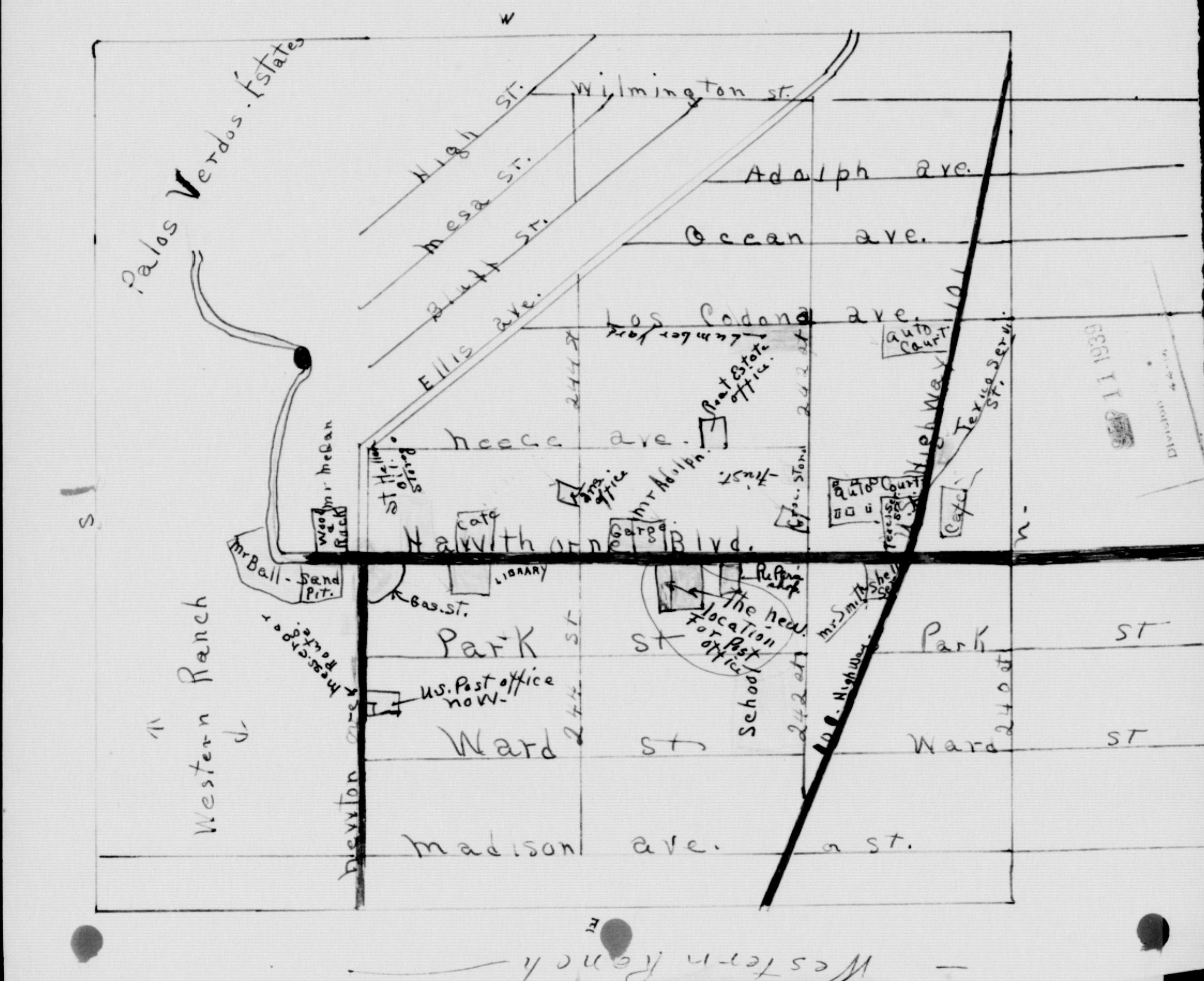
Map of downtown Walteria c. 1939, as submitted to the U.S. Post Office Department

Some Walteria "farms and businesses" were displaced by the Pacific Coast Highway.

== Notable businesses and attractions ==
Attractions of Walteria in the mid-20th century included the Begonia Farm, the Bird Farm, strawberry farms, and "the Smith Brothers Indian Village" restaurant.

The Palos Verdes Begonia Farm operated from 1941 to 1997. After the property was sold, the land was later developed in the Begonia Village neighborhood. A pocket park in Torrance named Newton Triangle was originally called Begonia Park, as it was donated to the city by the Bauman family that owned the Begonia Farm. The triangle was planted with California native species in 2006.

For a time the Begonia Farm shared a lot and a mutually beneficial association with the Smith Brothers Fish Shanty restaurant. The Fish Shanty was founded in 1948, and demolished in 1963, to be replaced by the Indian Village. The Indian Village restaurant sold "firewater" and denominated their menu prices in "wampum" and called its meeting areas "pow-wow rooms". The restaurant closed in the 1970s and the property later became a church.

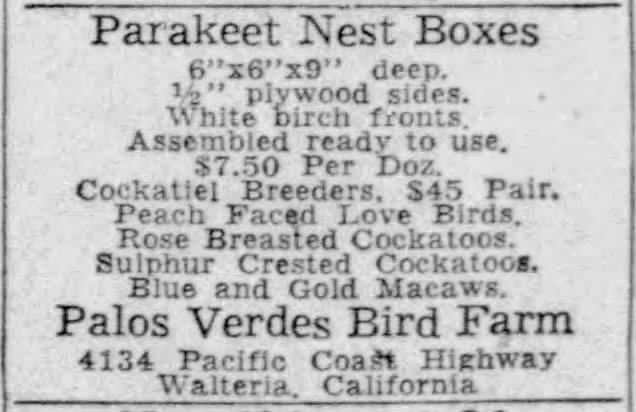
Palos Verdes Bird Farm classified advertisement 1953

The Palos Verdes Bird Farm opened in Walteria in 1952 at a site on Pacific Coast Highway between Crenshaw and Hawthorne Boulevards. In addition to buying and selling exotic birds, it provided took in wayward pets and injured wild birds. In 1964 it suffered a fire that killed almost 1,000 birds, including a greater sulphur-crested cockatoo named Tommy who had worked in film and television. One writer described visiting it as a child, "The Palos Verdes Bird Farm was my father's favorite pet store—it had the largest collection of birds in the city. Rows of aviaries lined the aisles; hundreds of painted finches swarmed from branch to branch as visitors passed by. Quail, partridge and imported poultry paced on sandy cage bottoms, and canaries, parakeets and myna birds sang, whistled and chattered from behind chrome-wire cages. It was a vacation abroad, disguised as a trip to a retail store." The shop closed in 1989 when the owners retired.

The Dicalite diatomaceous earth mine located in a Walteria ravine employed many Mexican-American men from neighboring communities from the 1920s through 1940s.

The notable La Primera preschool in Walteria was founded by psychologist and author Fitzhugh Dodson in 1963.

== In popular culture ==
Lucille Ball and Desi Arnaz shot a scene of The Long, Long Trailer in Walteria in 1953.

== See also ==
- History of the Japanese in Los Angeles
