= Fred Harb =

American stock car racing driver

- Born: Fareed Joseph Harb Jr. June 14, 1930; High Point, North Carolina, U.S.
- Died: December 18, 2016 (aged 86)

NASCAR Cup Series career
- 144 races run over 11 years
- Best finish: 24th (1958)
- First race: 1955 Race No. 36 (Montgomery)
- Last race: 1965 Myers Brothers 250 (Bowman Gray)
Wins	Top tens	Poles
0	42	0

Fareed "Fred" Joseph Harb Jr. (June 14, 1930 – December 18, 2016) was an American stock car racing driver. The High Point, North Carolina resident made 144 NASCAR Grand National Series starts from 1955 to 1965, earning 13 top fives and 42 top tens. He raced in the NASCAR Convertible Division, making 24 starts.

== Racing career ==
=== Early years ===
Harb started his NASCAR career in 1955, entering two races. He finished eleventh at Montgomery Speedway and twelfth at Orange Speedway driving for Ernest Woods. In 1956, Harb cashed in on local racing, winning $50 for finishing seventeenth in the first race of the season at Hickory Motor Speedway and another $50 for finishing 24th at Southern States Fairgrounds in Charlotte. That race he drove for Joe Blair, relative of friend Bill Blair. In 1957, he also ran three races, all within the Carolinas, and finishing inside the top-twenty for all of them but not recording a top-ten.

=== Prime years ===
1958 brought unprecedented success for Harb, as he entered 25 races on the Grand National circuit. Racing at famed venues such as Martinsville Speedway and North Wilkesboro Speedway, he garnered four top-fives and seven top-tens, including a best finish of third at Columbia Speedway. He finished 24th in series points that year. During the final race of the season, at Lakewood Speedway near Atlanta, Harb saved the life of fellow driver Bill Morton's life by blocking traffic while Morton's disabled car was sitting upside down in the middle of the track after an accident. This led to Harb receiving the John Naughton Sportsmanship Award.

For his 19 starts in 1959, Harb was plagued by failing to finish, recording ten of them on the season and at one point driving two races away from his No. 17 for Harvey Hege in his No. 28. However, Harb did equal his best finish of third and grab his first career pole, at Concord Speedway. During the 1960 season, Harb ran twenty races, not finishing half of them and finishing in the top-ten for another seven. He did run one race for the iconic Wood Brothers Racing, crashing out at Asheville-Weaverville Speedway. Harb expanded to his largest schedule in 1961, running 27 races. Per the times, though, the failed to finish over half. At times, strange problems sent Harb home, as the A-frame and the right rear axle were listed as causes.

In 1962, Harb ran 20 races for himself and one for B. G. Holloway in his No. 59. Of the 21 starts, Harb failed to finish 16 and finished in the top-ten in three of his remaining five starts. It was the only year in which Harb participated in more than ten races but did not record a top five finish. Running for himself as well as two different owners in 1963, Harb recorded a career-best finish of second at Bowman Gray Stadium. He also ran one race for the legendary Buck Baker, but Harb's engine failed en route to a 14th-place finish. He finished 41st in points by virtue of 16 starts.

=== End years ===
In 1964, Harb only attempted three races, two were at Bowman Gray. Rekindling an earlier relationship with Cliff Stewart, he recorded another top-five at Bowman Gray as well as another top twenty at Starkey Speedway. During his final season in 1965, Harb ran five races, all for Stewart. Having his efforts hampered by mechanical woes, he finished only two races, but in the two he did finish he recorded a fifth and a sixth.

=== Convertible racing ===
Harb got his first taste of convertible racing in 1957, where he entered one NASCAR Convertible Division race, finishing seventeenth at Wilson Speedway. In 1958, while running almost half of the Grand National schedule, Harb ran 15 of 19 Convertible races, recording a best finish of third at the Richmond Fairgrounds Raceway and recorded two other top-fives and seven other top-tens. As a result of the efforts, Harb finished eleventh in series points. Scaling back to just over half the schedule, Harb recorded just two top-tens all year, and had one disastrous race in which his motor blew on the first lap of a contest at Hickory Speedway.

== Off-track life ==
Harb was a member of the U. S. Army during the Korean War. When he was not racing, he operated an auto shop in his hometown of High Point, North Carolina. He was an active golfer and bowler until his later years. In 1949, he married his wife Betty, and they have three kids. Harb died at a Greensboro, North Carolina hospital on December 16, 2016.
