= Toecane, North Carolina =

- Unincorporated community
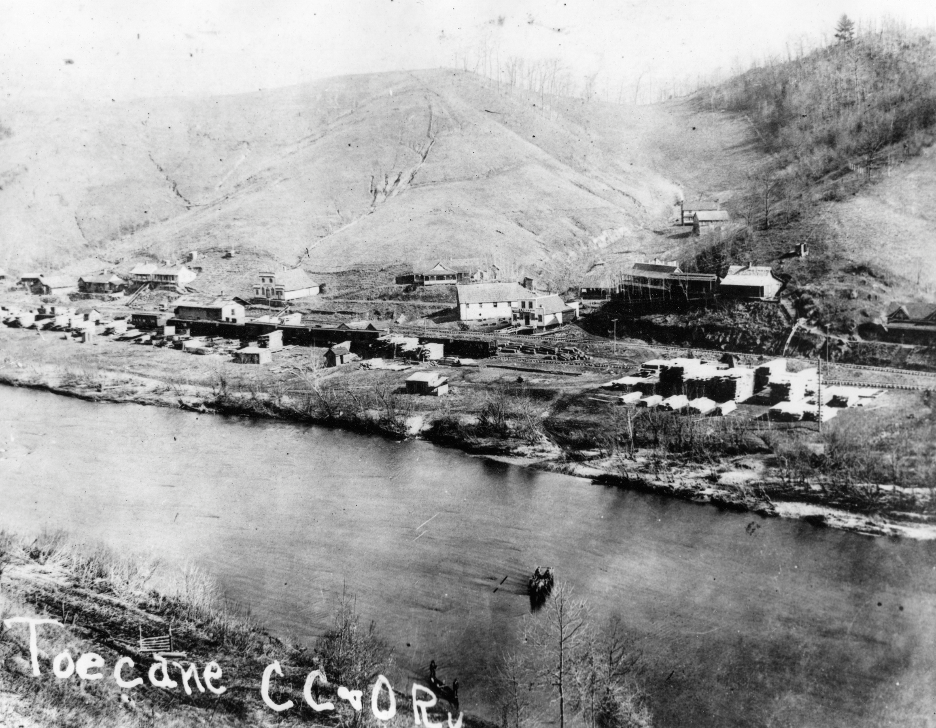
- Toecane in 1910

- Location within the state of North Carolina
- Coordinates: 36°0′32.42″N 82°11′31.45″W
- Country: United States
- State: North Carolina
- County: Mitchell
- First settled: 1863
- Railroad depot established: 1899 as Intermont Station
- Post office opened: 1902 as Toecane
- Incorporated: 1917 as Toecane Baptist Church
- Named for: Toe River and Cane Creek
- Elevation: 2,270 ft (692 m)
- Time zone: UTC-5 (Eastern (EST))
  - Summer (DST): UTC-4 (EDT)
- ZIP code: 28705
- Area code: 828
- GNIS feature ID: 1022958

Toecane, sometimes spelled Toe Cane, previously incorporated as Toecane Baptist Church, and originally known as Intermont Station from 1899 to 1902, is an unincorporated community in Mitchell County, North Carolina, located near the confluence of the North Toe River and Cane Creek.

== History ==
=== Origins ===
It is said that Hernando de Soto came near what is now Toecane in 1540. Toecane's modern settlement began between 1863 and 1870, when Thomas and Margaret Johnson purchased about 250 acres of land on the Toe River from the Davis and Burleson families. Their son William Johnson and his wife Elmira expanded the family's land holdings, and near the turn of the 20th century, had opened one of the first stores in the area.

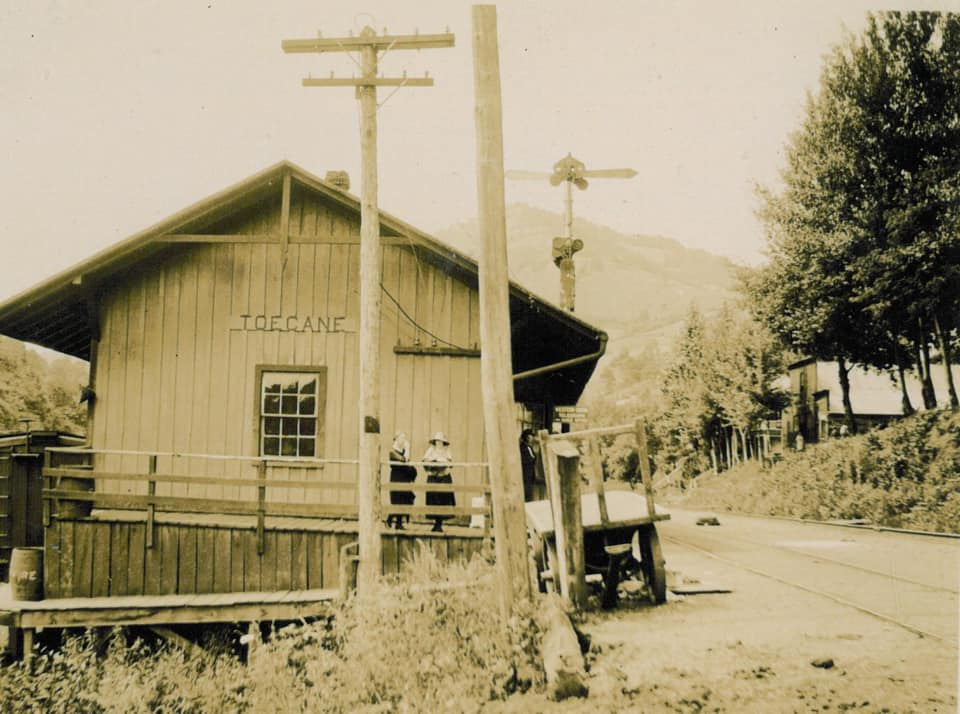
Toecane depot, circa before 1930

By 1893, the Charleston, Cincinnati, & Chicago Railroad Company, had laid 20 miles of track between Johnson City and Erwin. Desiring to promote the completion of the railroad through the area, local landowners, including Johnson and his wife, sold land on the banks of the Toe River to the railroad, later reconstituted as the Clinchfield Railroad. The line into Toecane would be constructed using convict labor. With continuing development in the area, and a railroad depot opening in 1899, the community required postal services, and thus a post office was established in 1902 bearing the name of Toecane. This was reportedly at the desire of the community's residents to have a name other than Intermont Station. John Richmond Garvin was the community's first postmaster.

=== Development ===
In 1909, a reporter from the Charlotte Evening Chronicle stated, “Toecane…is the centre of the greatest developed wealth along the entire line.” At the community's peak, it boasted approximately 300 residents, with railroad stops twice per day. Goods such as apples, lumber, mica, and livestock were regularly shipped from its depot, serving as a critical shipping center for Northern Mitchell County, as well as a social center. Toecane's first paved road arrived in 1919. In the 1920s, the Jordan Manufacturing company established a factory known as the Bobbin Plant, producing supplies for the textile industry.

Toecane Baptist Church was incorporated by the North Carolina General Assembly in its 1917 session, although a municipal government does not seem to have been provided for. 'Boisterous conduct,' intoxication by alcohol, discharging a firearm in a public place, and detonating explosives for purposes other than labor were prohibited within a one-mile radius of the Toecane Baptist Church. It is not known if or when Toecane was disincorporated, however, no municipal governance is in force.

Electricity arrived in Toecane in the 1920s, provided by local businessman Bill Masters through the Bakersville Milling, Light, and Power Company. Masters constructed a 3-story flour mill in Toecane which would open in 1920. The mill was powered by the river, and also produced electricity between 6 PM and 7 AM when the mill was not producing flour.

=== Later history ===
Masters' mill would be destroyed by fire on February 23, 1933. A mill was rebuilt to continue providing electricity and producing flour, but it was relocated to Loafers Glory. Railroad passenger service would cease in 1954, and its post office would close shortly thereafter. On December 13, 1974, Toecane was the site of a major railroad derailment, severely damaging a local bridge. Toecane would sustain damage in 2024 from Hurricane Helene.

== Geography ==
1968 map of Grandfather and Toecane Ranger Districts, Pisgah National Forest

The area of Toecane is located within the humid subtropical (Cfa) and oceanic (Cfb) climate zones, per the Köppen system of climate classification. The community may be accessed from North Carolina Highways 226, 226A, and 80, while CSX Transportation's Blue Ridge Subdivision runs through the community. It is approximately 3.3 miles from the county seat of Bakersville, 14 miles from the Tennessee state line, and 13 miles from Mitchell County's largest community, Spruce Pine. The community's main area, with most of its former industries, is located along a bend on Toe Cane Road. The Toecane Ranger District of the Pisgah National Forest is named for the community. Toecane borders Yancey County to the west.

== Culture ==
Toecane is home to the local art studio Guérard Studios, located in the former Emmitt Wilson store, producing glass crafts. It is also home to the annual Toecane Peeps Show, which raises funds for the Children's Organ Transplant Association.
