= Boonford, North Carolina =

- Ghost town
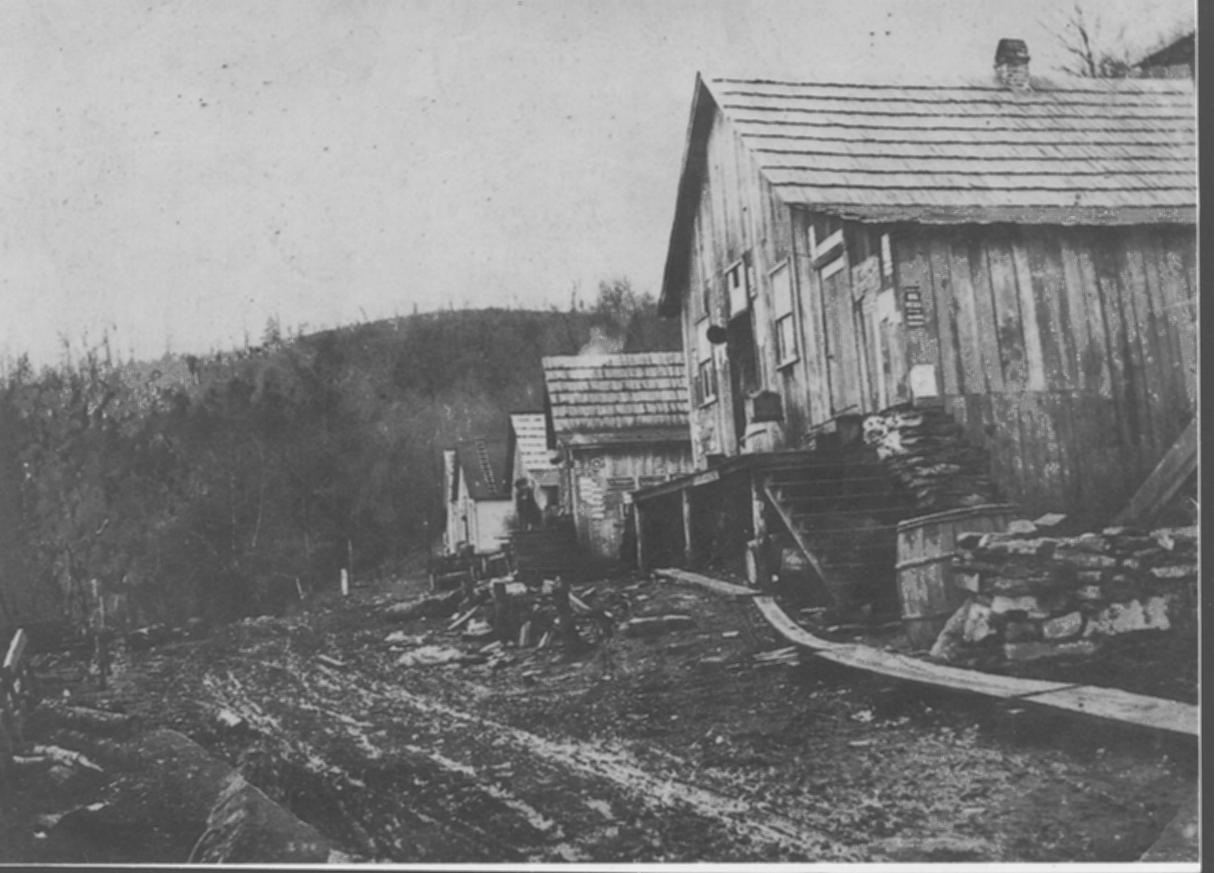
- The Clinchfield Railroad station in Boonford

- Location within the state of North Carolina
- Coordinates: 35°55′49.43″N 82°10′8.44″W
- Country: United States
- State: North Carolina
- County: Yancey, Mitchell
- Established: 1902
- Named for: Daniel Boone
- Elevation: 3,268 ft (996 m)

Population
  - Total: 0
- Time zone: UTC-5 (Eastern (EST))
  - Summer (DST): UTC-4 (EDT)
- Area code: 828
- GNIS feature ID: 1019262

Boonford is a ghost town in Yancey County, North Carolina, and Mitchell County, North Carolina in the United States, located near present-day North Carolina Highway 80.

== History ==
Boonford was named for Daniel Boone, as it was said he forded the North Toe River at the site. The town's development was spurred on by the arrival of the Clinchfield Railroad in 1902, on its line to Johnson City, Tennessee. Nearly every structure in the town no longer exists.

Boonford's U.S. Post Office opened on November 17, 1902, in Yancey County. It was moved to Mitchell County on December 28, 1914, and closed on May 31, 1951.

The town was home to a number of feldspar and mica mines.
