= North Carolina Highway 197 =

State highway in North Carolina, US

North Carolina Highway 197

Route information
- Maintained by NCDOT
- Length: 57.7 mi (92.9 km)
- Existed: By 1924–present

Major junctions
- South end: Future I-26 / US 19 / US 23 near Flat Creek
- US 19E in Burnsville; NC 226 in Red Hill
- North end: SR 395 at the Tennessee state line near Poplar

Location
- Country: United States
- State: North Carolina
- Counties: Buncombe, Yancey, Mitchell

Highway system
- North Carolina Highway System; Interstate; US; State; Scenic
← NC 194	→ NC 198

North Carolina Highway 197 (NC 197) is a South-to-North state highway in Western North Carolina. The route is approximately 58 miles (93 km) in length and with its continuation into Tennessee as SR 395 connects Erwin, Tennessee to Flat Creek, North Carolina. Portions of this highway lie within the Pisgah National Forest and is one of the few highways in the state with an unpaved portion.

== Route description ==
=== Mitchell County ===
Beginning at the state line with Tennessee, NC 197 enters the Pisgah National Forest and winds south down the Unaka escarpment to Poplar. South of Poplar, NC 197 begins the first of three segments where it follows the North Toe River and the former Clinchfield Railroad. It intersects and overlaps NC 226 for a short distance near Red Hill.

=== Yancey County ===
The final segment of NC 197 that follows the Toe River does so in the reverse direction as the previous two times this occurred. This segment comes after a railroad crossing and a new concrete arch bridge that carries the highway across the Toe River into Yancey County.

After leaving the river area, NC 197 continues through mountains and grassy knolls until it arrives at U.S. Route 19E (US 19E) just east of Burnsville.

Following a short overlap with US 19E, NC 197 leaves US 19E in Burnsville as Pensacola Road and goes through the Cane River valley to Pensacola. From Pensacola, NC 197 turns right and proceeds over Cane River Gap into Buncombe County after passing through Murchison.

=== Buncombe County ===
As it enters Buncombe County, NC 197 (now North Fork Road) turns to gravel as it crosses the Cane River Gap for a short distance and reenters the Pisgah National Forest for a short distance. As it winds its way down to the Barnardsville valley it crosses over the headwaters of Ivy Creek four times before it continues onto the pavement near Barnardsville.

From Barnardsville, NC 197 (as the Barnardsville Highway) becomes a relatively straight road that partially follows Ivy Creek until its junction with Future Interstate 26/US 19/US 23 at exit 15 near Flat Creek. Proceeding forward from the end of NC 197 is Jupiter Road (SR 1756).

A right turn before the overpass allows access to west I-26/north US 19/US 23 to Johnson City, Tennessee. A left turn after the I-26 underpass allows access to east I-26/south US 19/US 23 to Asheville.

== History ==
From the 1920s-1940s, NC 197 was formed, running from Cane Creek Post Office (near Burnsville) to Bakersville. Portions of that alignment are now NC 226. Between 1924 and 1948 the highway's route had been changed to run from the former NC 26 at Red Hill southward to Flat Creek along a route similar to that in use today. In the 1980s, NC 197 is extended from Red Hill to the Tennessee state line where it enters Tennessee as TN 395.

In late September 2024, parts of NC 197 were washed out by the effects of Hurricane Helene in North Carolina. In March 2025, the North Carolina Department of Transportation (NCDOT) stated two sections of the highway and immediate secondary roads, near Pensacola and other near Green Mountain, would cost around $650 million, with construction running through 2027.

=== North Carolina Highway 695 ===
North Carolina Highway 695
- Location: Stocksville–Burnsville, NC
- Existed: 1932–1941

== Major junctions ==
County	Location	mi	km	Destinations	Notes
Buncombe	Flat Creek	0.0– 0.1	0.0– 0.16	Future I-26 / US 19 / US 23 / Jupiter Road – Asheville, Johnson City	Exit 15 (Future I-26)
Yancey	Burnsville	30.8	49.6	US 19E south / Pensacola Road – Burnsville	Southern end of US 19E concurrency
Yancey		31.5	50.7	US 19E north – Spruce Pine	Northern end of US 19E concurrency
Mitchell	Red Hill	42.6	68.6	NC 226 south – Bakersville, Spruce Pine	Southern end of NC 226 concurrency
Mitchell	Red Hill	42.8	68.9	NC 226 north	Northern end of NC 226 concurrency
Mitchell		57.7	92.9	SR 395 west (Rock Creek Road) – Erwin	Tennessee state line
1.000 mi = 1.609 km; 1.000 km = 0.621 mi: Concurrency terminus
