= North Carolina Highway 80 =

State highway in North Carolina, US

North Carolina Highway 80

Route information
- Maintained by NCDOT
- Length: 37.2 mi (59.9 km)
- Existed: 1940–present
- Tourist routes: Mount Mitchell Scenic Drive

Major junctions
- South end: US 70 in Pleasant Gardens
- US 19E near Micaville
- North end: NC 226A near Bakersville

Location
- Country: United States
- State: North Carolina
- Counties: McDowell, Yancey, Mitchell

Highway system
- North Carolina Highway System; Interstate; US; State; Scenic
← NC 79	→ NC 81

North Carolina Highway 80 (NC 80) is a primary state highway in the U.S. state of North Carolina. The highway connects the various mountain communities straddled along Buck Creek, South Toe River and North Toe River in Western North Carolina and serves as a direct route, via the Blue Ridge Parkway, to Mount Mitchell State Park.

== Route description ==
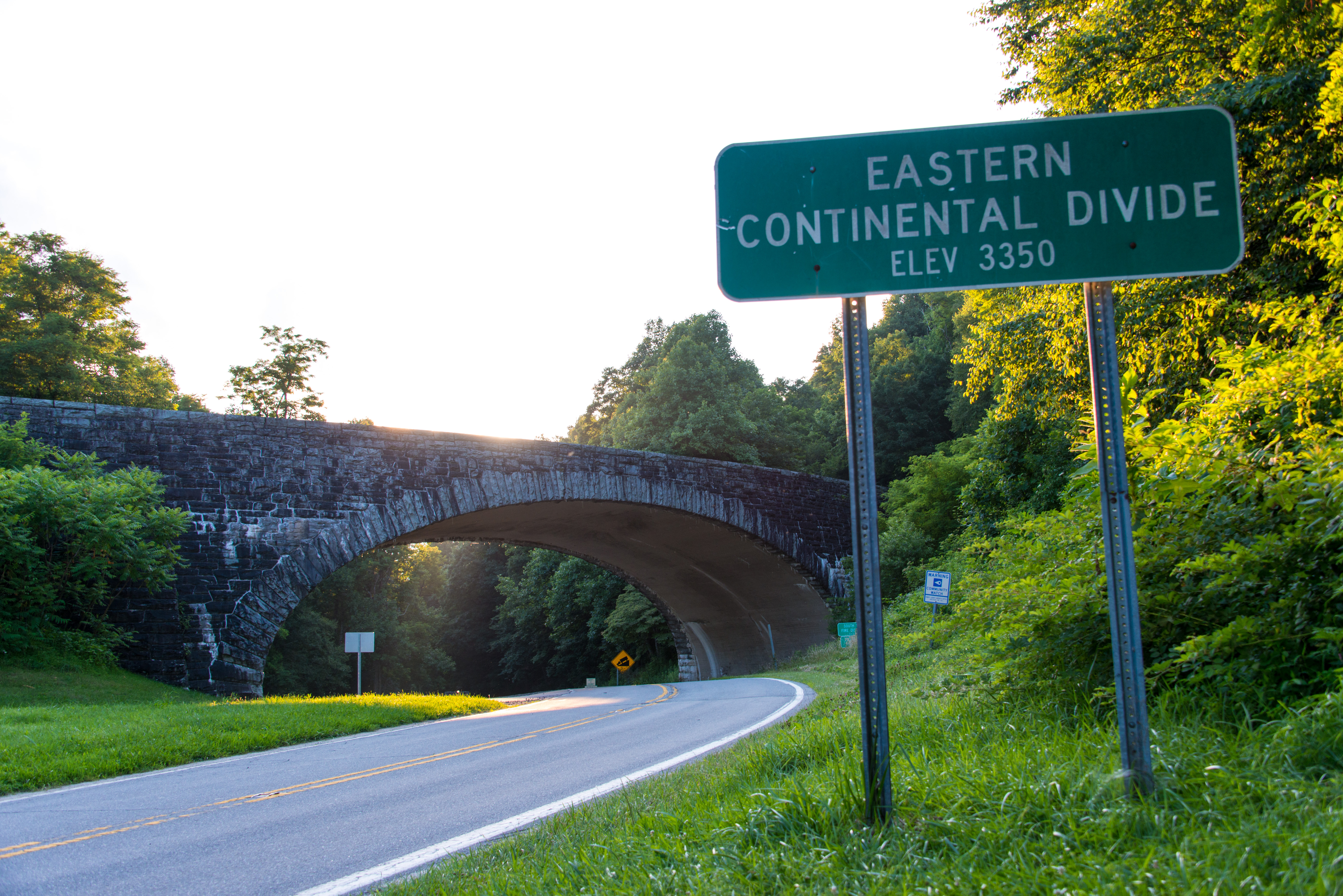
NC 80 at Buck Creek Gap

NC 80 is a 37.9-mile-long (61.0 km) two-lane mountain highway between US 70, in Pleasant Gardens, and NC 226A, near Bakersville. The highway is popular with bike and motorcycle enthusiasts, because of its hairpin turns and also makes up part of the Mount Mitchell Scenic Drive between the Blue Ridge Parkway and Micaville. Trucks are not recommended to take NC 80, with multiple warning signs posted at each major intersection.

In McDowell County, NC 80 begins in the Pleasant Gardens community, located west of Marion. Going north, it soon arrives at Lake Tahoma, built in 1924, a private lake which has a notable stone building situated in it, connected by causeway. Soon after leaving the western shores of the lake, the highway hugs along Buck Creek to the Sunnyvale community, where it then begins its ascent up Singecat Ridge. The following 5.5 miles (8.9 km) has numerous 180-degree turns and is recommended to drive carefully along this section. At Buck Creek Gap, NC 80 connects with the Blue Ridge Parkway, where travelers may continue on their way towards Mount Mitchell State Park; the location also features an overlook and is where both the Eastern Continental Divide (3,350 feet (1,020 m)) and the Yancey County line cross.

From Buck Creek Gap, NC 80 descends into the Busick community and then along the South Toe River. Near Hamrick is the Carolina Hemlocks Recreation Area, part of the Pisgah National Forest, where visitors can hike nearby trails and camp. 1.7 miles (2.7 km) further downstream is Celo Community, located at the base of Celo Knob. In Micaville, NC 80 connects with US 19E, where travelers can continue on towards Burnsville or Spruce Pine. After a 2.25-mile (3.62 km) overlap with US 19E, NC 80 continues north into Mitchell County.

After crossing the North Toe River, NC 80 becomes windy as it hugs along Ellis, Gouge and Burnt Mountains. Both Kona and Lunday are found along the banks of the North Toe River here; while Bandana, known for its local pottery, is situated along Sink Hole Creek. At NC 226A (Mine Creek Road), NC 80 ends; continuing north along NC 226A goes to Loafers Glory and NC 80's pre-1996 northern terminus. Both directions on NC 226A will take travelers on to Bakersville.

== History ==
The first NC 80 was established in 1921 and traveled from South Carolina to Virginia, via Wadesboro, Albemarle, Salisbury, Mocksville and Mount Airy. In 1926, NC 80 was duplex with NC 20 in Wadesboro. By 1929, NC 80 was realigned to go through Rockwell. In 1934, most of NC 80 was replaced by US 52, from South Carolina to Salisbury, and US 601, from Salisbury to Mount Airy; only the part northeast of Mount Airy to the Virginia state line remained. In 1940, the remaining section was renumbered as NC 103.

The second and current NC 80 was established in 1940 as a renumbering of NC 104, between US 64/US 70, in Pleasant Gardens, to NC 26, in Loafers Glory. In 1970, NC 80 was realigned onto improved roadway to US 19E, near Micaville; the old alignment along Stream Road (SR 1425) was consequently downgraded. In 1996, NC 80 was truncated at Mine Creek Road, near Bakersville, upon the establishment of NC 226A along it, which also replaced its former routing to Loafers Glory.

== Major intersections ==
County	Location	mi	km	Destinations	Notes
McDowell	Pleasant Gardens	0.0	0.0	US 70 to I-40 – Asheville, Marion	
McDowell–Yancey county line		12.1	19.5	Blue Ridge Parkway	Interchange
Yancey	Micaville	26.2	42.2	US 19E south – Burnsville	South end of US 19E overlap
Yancey		27.5	44.3	US 19E north – Spruce Pine	North end of US 19E overlap
Mitchell		37.9	61.0	NC 226A (Mine Creek Road)	
1.000 mi = 1.609 km; 1.000 km = 0.621 mi: Concurrency terminus
