= North Carolina Highway 226A =

State highway in North Carolina, United States

North Carolina Highway 226A

Route information
- Maintained by NCDOT
- Length: 16.0 mi (25.7 km)
- Existed: 1961–present

Little Switzerland segment
- Length: 12.3 mi (19.8 km)
- South end: NC 226 near Woodlawn
- North end: NC 226 near Little Switzerland

Bakersville segment
- Length: 3.7 mi (6.0 km)
- South end: NC 226 near Ledger
- North end: NC 226 in Loafers Glory

Location
- Country: United States
- State: North Carolina
- Counties: McDowell, Mitchell

Highway system
- North Carolina Highway System; Interstate; US; State; Scenic
← NC 226	→ NC 231

North Carolina Highway 226A (NC 226A) is an alternate state highway in the U.S. state of North Carolina. Signed along two segments that branch from NC 226: The first connecting the community of Little Switzerland; the second as a bypass west of Bakersville. It is also distinctive as being one of two alternate state routes in North Carolina, the other being NC 268A.

== Route description ==
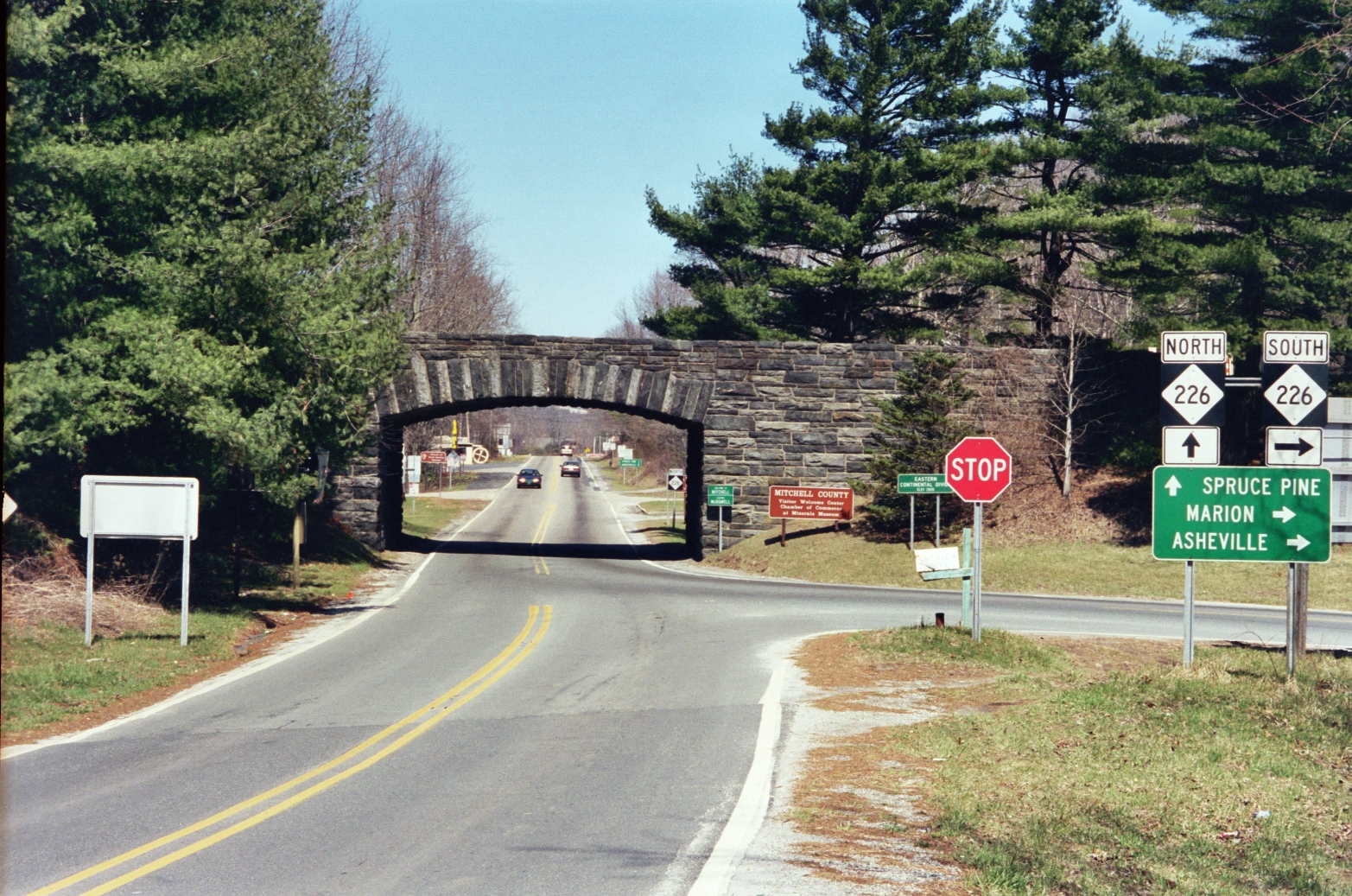
NC 226 / NC 226A at Gillespie Gap

The first section, a two-lane mountain highway also known as the Diamondback by motorcycle enthusiasts, begins near Woodlawn, 1.2 miles (1.9 km) from US 221. Once on NC 226A, the first sign is a notice to truckers indicating steep winding road ahead, trucks not recommended. For the first 3.7 miles (6.0 km), it marginally increases in elevation, yet curvy, as it follows westerly along the banks of the Armstrong Creek then Three Mile Creek. At Holifield Cemetery (on right), NC 226A begins to quickly climb in elevation with a sensational amount of curves, as it climbs Grassy Mountain. Reaching Chestnut Grove Road, in Little Switzerland, the worst of the climb and curves is over, rising over 1,900 feet (580 m) from its start. Heading east now, NC 226A meets back with NC 226 at Gillespie Gap, just 90 feet (27 m) from the Mitchell County line, the Eastern Continental Divide and the Blue Ridge Parkway.

The second section, a two-lane mountain highway, begins just north of Ledger, and goes northwest bypassing Bakersville. At half-way, it connects with NC 80, which heads south towards Micaville. After 3.7 miles (6.0 km), it reconnects with NC 226 at Loafers Glory. The road is not nearly as curvy as its first section, but has a posted speed limit of 40 miles per hour (64 km/h) on its more curvy eastern half.

== History ==
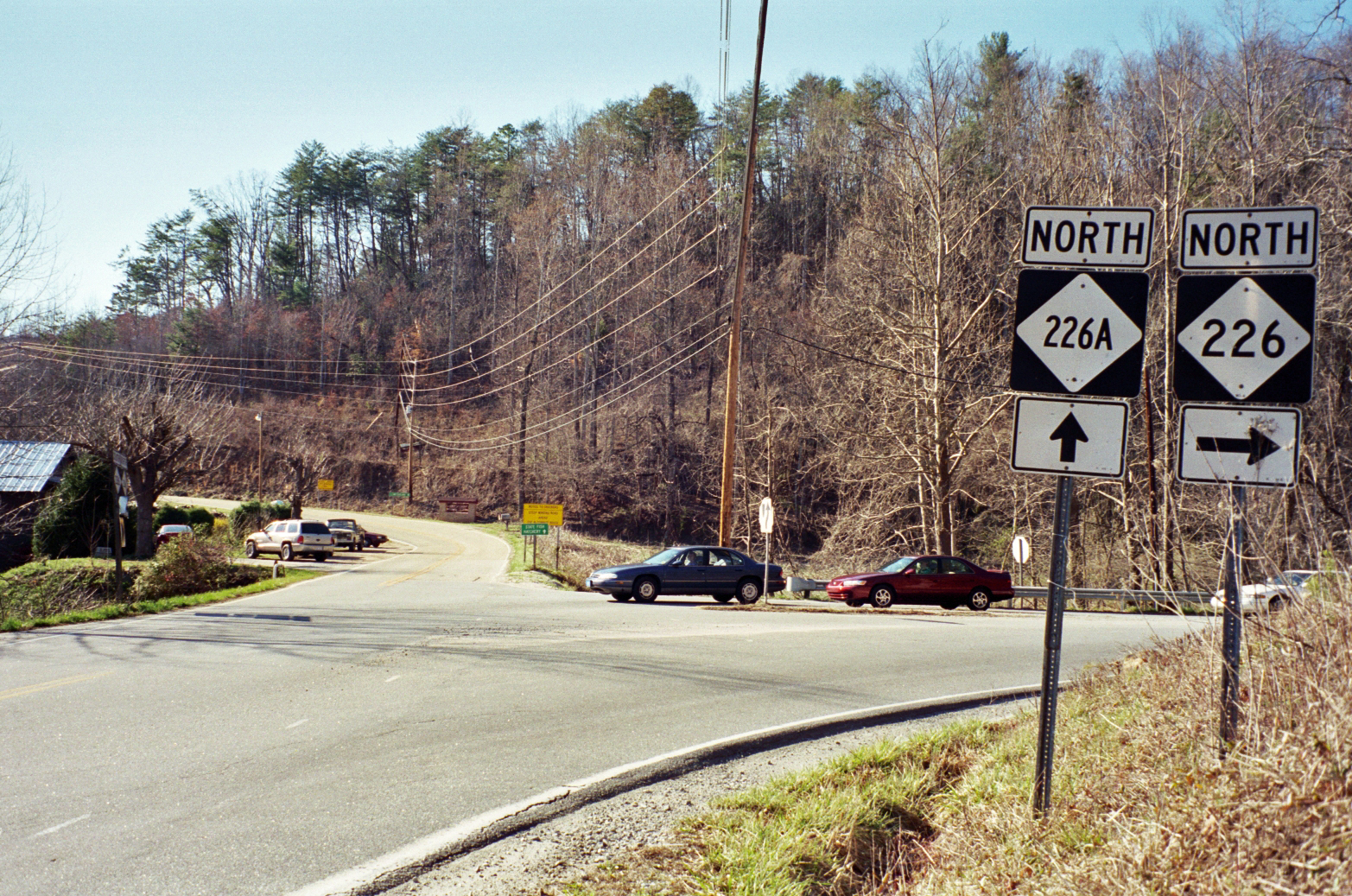
NC 226A / NC 226 in Turkey Cove

NC 226A was established in 1961 as a renumbering of NC 26A through Little Switzerland.

Prior to 1961, the road that connected Little Switzerland was authorized in 1913 to be a toll road, operated and maintained by the Carolina, Clinchfield, and Ohio Railroad. Called Etchoe (pronounced Et-cho) Pass Road, it went from Gillespie Gap to Little Switzerland along the ridge line; toll booths were constructed at Lynn Gap. In 1921, NC 19 was established along Etchoe Pass Road, which by that time was toll-free and continued to Woodlawn. However, it was not without controversy because the nearby Cox Creek route was identified to be shorter, though steeper. The longer route won out, though partly because several state lawmakers had vested interest in the area, and the Cox Creek route was temporarily abandoned. In 1934, NC 19 was replaced by NC 26 in the area; justification was to avoid confusion with US 19. By the early 1940s, the Cox Creek route had reemerged as a new paved road, known locally as "the shortcut." By 1947, NC 26 was rerouted along Cox Creek route and the Etchoe Pass Road became NC 26A.

In 1996, the second NC 226A was established along Mine Creek Road, providing a curvy bypass of Bakersville. While the eastern half of the route was an upgrade of existing secondary road, the western half was formerly part of NC 80.

=== North Carolina Highway 26A ===
North Carolina Highway 26A
- Location: Little Switzerland, North Carolina
- Length: 12.3 mi (19.8 km)
- Existed: 1947–1961

North Carolina Highway 26A (NC 26A) was established around 1947 after NC 26 was rerouted on the more direct route between Woodlawn and Gillespie Gap, through the Cox Creek valley. In 1961, NC 26A was renumbered to NC 226A, in lockstep with NC 226; justification for change was to avoid confusion with I-26.

== Junction list ==
County	Location	mi	km	Destinations	Notes
McDowell		0.0	0.0	NC 226 – Spruce Pine, Marion, Asheville	
McDowell	Little Switzerland	9.5	15.3	Chestnut Grove Road	To Blue Ridge Parkway
McDowell		12.3	19.8	NC 226 – Spruce Pine, Marion, Asheville	
Gap in route
Mitchell		0.0	0.0	NC 226 – Bakersville, Spruce Pine	
Mitchell		1.7	2.7	NC 80 south – Micaville	
Mitchell	Loafers Glory	3.7	6.0	NC 226 – Bakersville, Red Hill	
1.000 mi = 1.609 km; 1.000 km = 0.621 mi
