= Red Hill, North Carolina =

- Unincorporated community
- Location within North Carolina Location within the United States
- Coordinates: 36°01′20″N 82°13′40″W
- Country: United States
- State: North Carolina
- County: Mitchell
- Named for: Soil erosion
- Elevation: 2,375 ft (724 m)
- Time zone: UTC-5 (Eastern (EST))
  - Summer (DST): UTC-4 (EDT)
- ZIP Code: 28705 (Bakersville)
- Area code: 828
- GNIS feature ID: 1022191

Red Hill is an unincorporated community in Mitchell County, North Carolina, United States. The community is located where North Carolina Highway 197 (NC 197) and North Carolina Highway 226 (NC 226) merge for .2 miles (0.32 km); geographically it is north of the North Toe River, along the southeastern slope of Pumpkin Patch Mountain.

== History ==
The community of Red Hill was named for a family that over-farmed one of its hillsides; after heavy rains the topsoil washed-away, all that was left was a "red hill." The Red Hill Post Office operated 1853–1911; during 1894–1911, the community was spelled "Redhill." In 1902, the South & Western Railroad established rail service that connected Red Hill between Spruce Pine and Lost Cove, Tennessee. Over the years, the rail line had expanded and changed ownership; the current successor is CSX, which continues rail service through the area.
