= Loafer's Glory =

Loafer's Glory may refer to:

- Loafers Glory, North Carolina
- Loafer's Glory, a 1997 album by Utah Phillips and Mark Ross; also the name of a radio program hosted by Phillips from 1997–2001
