= Sockwell =

Sockwell is a surname. Notable people with the surname include:

- Brian Sockwell (born 1968), American professional stock car racing driver
- Carroll Sockwell (1943–1992), American artist
- Jim Sockwell (1942–2026), American pottery and marquetry craftsman
