= Estatoe, North Carolina =

- Unincorporated community
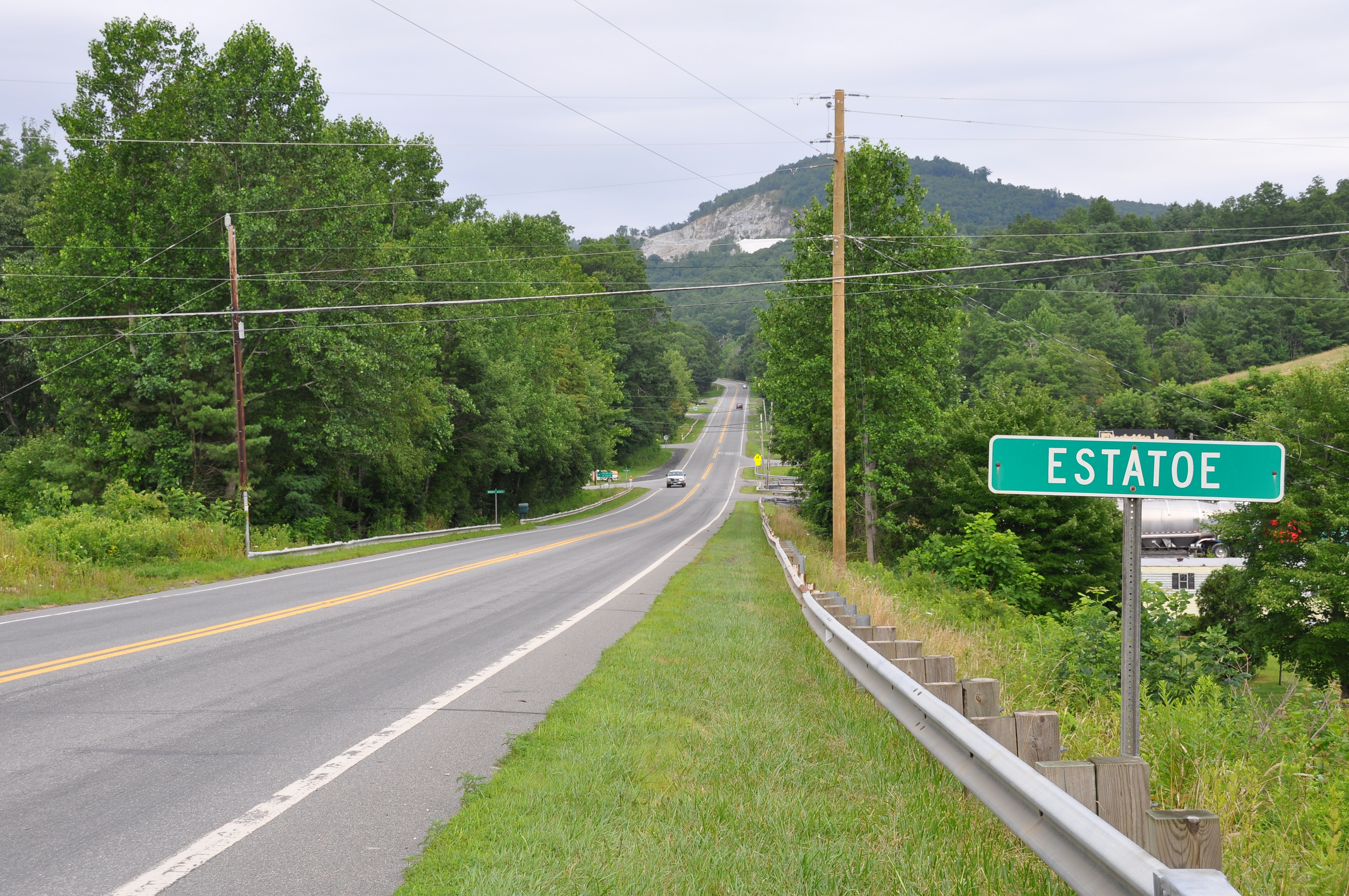
- Estatoe sign, facing northbound US 19E.

- Location within North Carolina Location within the United States
- Coordinates: 35°54′12″N 82°07′10″W
- Country: United States
- State: North Carolina
- County: Mitchell
- Named for: The daughter of an Indian chief
- Elevation: 2,635 ft (803 m)
- Time zone: UTC-5 (Eastern (EST))
  - Summer (DST): UTC-4 (EDT)
- ZIP Code: 28777 (Spruce Pine)
- Area code: 828
- GNIS feature ID: 1020171

Estatoe is an unincorporated community in Mitchell County, North Carolina, United States. It is located where Brushy Creek crosses U.S. Route 19E (US 19E), west of Spruce Pine.

== History ==
The name Estatoe, pronounced 'S - ta - toe', comes from a story about an Indian chief's daughter named Estatoe who fell in love with a warrior of a rival tribe. Because their love could never be accepted by either's families, they jumped from a precipice into the depths of a nearby river. Estatoe's father declared the river would forever bear her name, as does the community, although the river's has since been shorten to "Toe."

The Estatoe Post Office operated from 1888 to 1951, when it was replaced with rural letter carrier service from Spruce Pine.

The Eastatoe River (Estatoee) in South Carolina bears the same name.
