= North Carolina Highway 226 =

State highway in North Carolina, US

North Carolina Highway 226

- Route of NC 226 highlighted in red

Route information
- Maintained by NCDOT
- Length: 101.0 mi (162.5 km)
- Existed: 1961–present
- Tourist routes: South Mountain Scenery

Major junctions
- South end: US 29 near Grover
- US 74 in Shelby; US 64 near Dysartsville; I-40 near Marion; US 221 in Marion; US 70 in Marion; US 19E in Spruce Pine
- North end: SR 107 at the Tennessee state line near Buladean

Location
- Country: United States
- State: North Carolina
- Counties: Cleveland, Rutherford, McDowell, Mitchell

Highway system
- North Carolina Highway System; Interstate; US; State; Scenic
| ← NC 225 | → NC 226A |

North Carolina Highway 226 (NC 226) is a primary state highway in the U.S. state of North Carolina. Traveling north–south through Western North Carolina, it connects the cities and towns of Grover, Shelby, Marion, Spruce Pine and Bakersville. It also a scenic byway in the South Mountains area and connects with the summer colony of Little Switzerland, via NC 226A.

== Route description ==
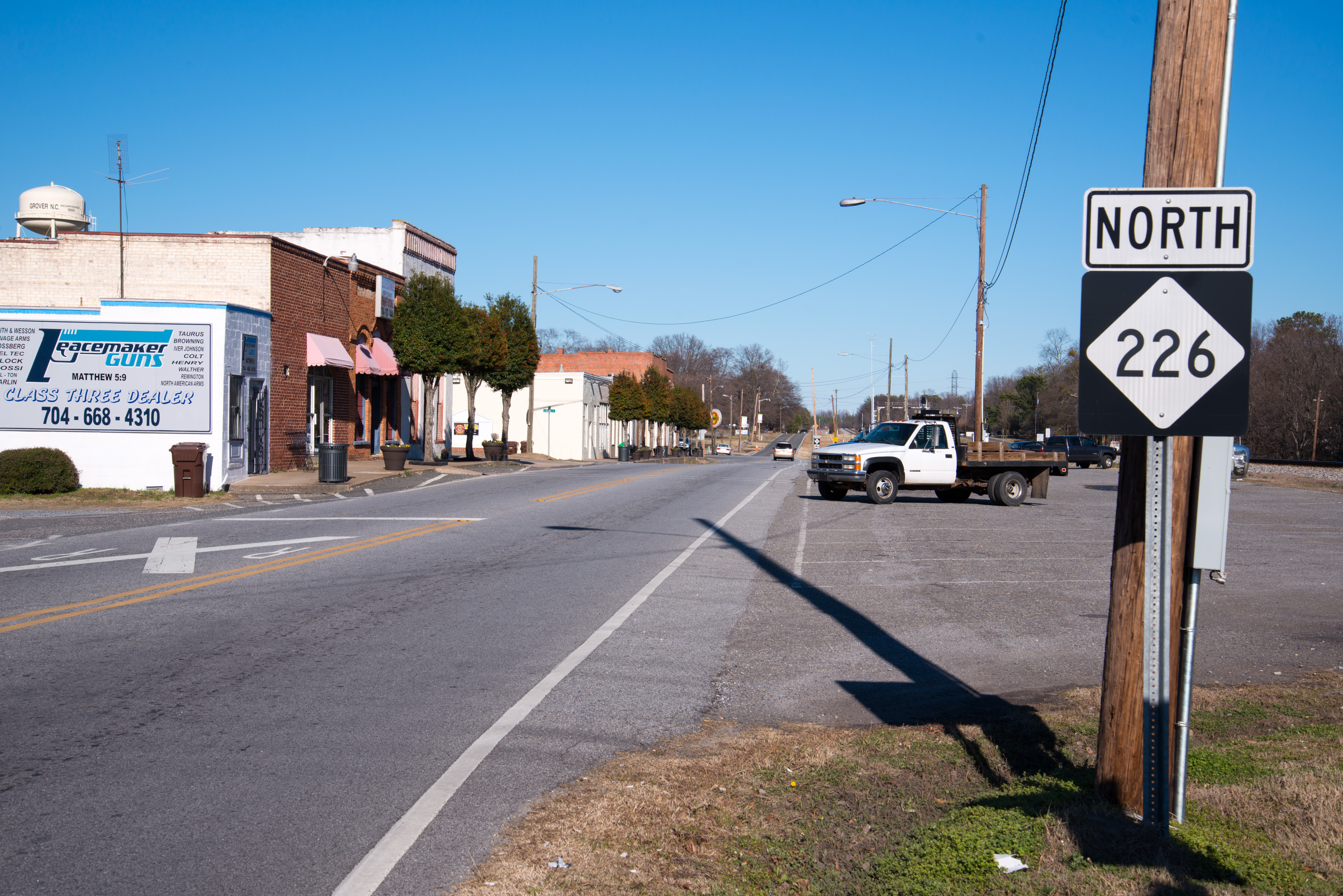
NC 226 in downtown Grover

NC 226 begins at US 29, in Grover, approximately 211 feet (64 m) from the South Carolina state line. Through downtown Grover, it goes northwesterly, through Patterson Springs, to Shelby. In concurrency with US 74, it stays south of the downtown area, then splits with US 74 continuing north to Metcalf, where it becomes the South Mountain Scenery scenic byway. The byway, which stretches 33 miles (53 km) along NC 226 to Marion, is designated for its extensive views of the South Mountains. Traversing through this rural area of farmlands and forest, NC 226 goes the through Campcall and Polkville before leaving Cleveland County, uneventful through Rutherford County, and crosses over US 64 on one of the earliest grade separated interchanges in the state before reaching the Dysartsville community in McDowell County.

Soon after crossing under I-40 (exit 86), NC 226 begins its concurrency with US 221 bypassing west of downtown Marion on a four lane divided freeway. At the US 70 intersection, travelers can follow highway signs to Mount Mitchell, the highest peak east of the Mississippi River. In Woodlawn, NC 226 splits from US 221, which continues towards Linville. A one-mile (1.6 km) from the intersection, in Turkey Cove, NC 226 breaks-off the first of two alternate routes; NC 226A travels the historic Etchoe Pass Road, as it climbs, with several hairpin turns, up Grassy Mountain to Little Switzerland. The routing NC 226 takes, along Cox Creek, is shorter and less curvy than the alternate route, but it has a steep grade which require trucks to stay slow when they descend; one runaway truck ramp and several turn-offs are along this stretch. At Gillespie Gap, the alternate route rejoins NC 226. As it crosses under the Blue Ridge Parkway, it also crosses the Eastern Continental Divide and the county line into Mitchell.

North from the Gillespie Gap, NC 226 goes through the Grassy Creek community before entering Spruce Pine. After a short concurrency with US 19E, it continues northwesterly towards Bakersville, passing by and through the communities of Minpro, Penland, Normanville and Ledger. Near Bakersville, the second alternate route breaks-off; NC 226A, along Mine Creek Road, provides a bypass route instead of going through downtown area, reconnecting at Loafers Glory. In Bakersville, NC 226 connects with NC 261, which continues to Roan Mountain. West of Bakersville, NC 226 connects with NC 197, in Red Hill, then goes north to Honeycutt. Following along Big Rock Creek to Buladean, it then goes northwesterly alongside Spring Creek before ascending Iron Mountain. At Iron Mountain Gap (3,727 ft (1,136 m)), NC 226 crosses the Appalachian Trail as it enters Tennessee and continues as SR 107 towards Erwin.

== History ==
Established in 1961 as a renumbering of NC 26. In 1966, NC 226 was removed from downtown Shelby, rerouted from Earl Street onto US 74 Bypass to Polkville Road. In 1994, NC 226 was moved with US 221 onto a new bypass west of Marion, leaving US 221 Business. In 2000, NC 226 was realigned onto new road west of downtown Spruce Pine.

=== North Carolina Highway 26 ===
North Carolina Highway 26
- Location: Grover–TN State Line
- Length: 101.4 mi (163.2 km)
- Existed: 1921–1961

The first NC 26 was established as an original state highway in 1921. It traversed from the South Carolina state line, near Pineville, north along Park Road into downtown Charlotte. Leaving the downtown area via Statesville Avenue, it continued north through Huntersville, Davidson, Mooresville, Statesville, Elkin, Sparta, and finally Twin Oaks, before finally reaching the Virginia state line. In both border states, the highway continued with the number 26.

In 1927, US 21 was assigned in concurrency with all of NC 26, except for a few miles south of Pineville. In 1933, US 521 was assigned to the remaining piece of NC 26. In 1934, the first NC 26 was decommissioned, and the route remained US 21 and US 521.

The second NC 26 was quickly reestablished in late 1934, replacing NC 19 from US 221 in Woodlawn, north through Little Switzerland, Spruce Pine, Bakersville, Red Hill, and then finally west to US 19W/US 23 in Sioux. In 1940, NC 26 was rerouted north from Red Hill to the Tennessee state line. Also in 1940, NC 26 was extended south, overlapping with US 221 to Marion; it then replaced NC 190 through Polkville and Shelby, ending at US 29 in Grover. Around 1947, NC 26 was moved onto new road bypassing Little Switzerland; the old route became NC 26A. In 1956, NC 26 was moved onto new road near Dysartville, removing a concurrency with US 64 and establishing one of the earliest grade-separated intersections in the state. In 1961, NC 26 was renumbered to NC 226, because of the coming establishment of Interstate 26.

=== North Carolina Highway 190 ===
North Carolina Highway 190
- Location: Grover–Brindletown, NC
- Existed: 1930–1940

== Junction list ==
| County | Location | mi | km | Destinations | Notes |
|---|---|---|---|---|---|
| Cleveland | Grover | 0.0 | 0.0 | US 29 (M H Camp Highway) – Blacksburg, Kings Mountain | South Carolina state line is 211 feet (64 m) south of intersection |
| Cleveland | Patterson Springs | 6.2 | 10.0 | NC 180 south (Post Road) – Gaffney | South end of NC 180 overlap |
| Cleveland | | 7.7 | 12.4 | NC 180 north (Post Road) – Morganton | North end of NC 180 overlap |
| Cleveland | Shelby | 10.0 | 16.1 | US 74 east (Dixon Boulevard) – Kings Mountain, Charlotte | East end of US 74 overlap |
| Cleveland | Shelby | 10.3 | 16.6 | NC 150 (Dekalb Street) | |
| Cleveland | Shelby | 10.5 | 16.9 | NC 18 (Lafayette Street) – Shelby, Gaffney | |
| Cleveland | Shelby | 12.0 | 19.3 | US 74 Bus. east (Warren Street) | |
| Cleveland | Shelby | 12.7 | 20.4 | US 74 west (Dixon Boulevard) – Forest City, Columbus | West end of US 74 overlap |
| Cleveland | | 14.3 | 23.0 | Shelby Bypass – Asheville | |
| Cleveland | Metcalf | 17.6 | 28.3 | Double Shoals Road | |
| Cleveland | Polkville | 23.2 | 37.3 | NC 182 east (Stagecoach Trail) – Lawndale | Western terminus of NC 182 |
| Cleveland | Polkville | 23.5 | 37.8 | NC 10 east (Casar Road) – Casar | To South Mountains State Park |
| Rutherford | | 33.6 | 54.1 | Bostic Sunshine Highway – Bostic | |
| McDowell | | 40.9 | 65.8 | US 64 – Rutherfordton, Morganton | |
| McDowell | Marion | 51.5 | 82.9 | I-40 – Asheville, Morganton | Exit 86 (I-40) |
| McDowell | Marion | 52.5 | 84.5 | US 221 south / US 221 Bus. north (Rutherford Road) – Rutherfordton | South end of US 221 overlap |
| McDowell | Marion | 55.0 | 88.5 | Henderson Street – Downtown Marion | |
| McDowell | Marion | 55.7 | 89.6 | Tate Street | |
| McDowell | Marion | 57.7 | 92.9 | US 70 – Old Fort, Asheville | To Mount Mitchell State Park |
| McDowell | Marion | 58.3 | 93.8 | US 221 Bus. south (Main Street) | To Lake James State Park |
| McDowell | | 60.3 | 97.0 | Toms Creek Road | |
| McDowell | Woodlawn | 64.6 | 104.0 | US 221 north – Linville | North end of US 221 overlap |
| McDowell | | 65.8 | 105.9 | NC 226A north | |
| McDowell | | 69.8 | 112.3 | NC 226A south – Little Switzerland | |
| Mitchell | | 69.9 | 112.5 | Blue Ridge Parkway | |
| Mitchell | Spruce Pine | 74.5 | 119.9 | US 19E north – Newland, Cranberry | North end of US 19E overlap |
| Mitchell | Spruce Pine | 75.3 | 121.2 | US 19E south – Estatoe, Burnsville | South end of US 19E overlap |
| Mitchell | | 78.1 | 125.7 | Penland Road – Penland | |
| Mitchell | | 81.8 | 131.6 | NC 226A north (Mine Creek Road) | |
| Mitchell | Bakersville | 84.7 | 136.3 | NC 261 north – Roan Mountain | |
| Mitchell | Loafers Glory | 87.2 | 140.3 | NC 226A south – Micaville | |
| Mitchell | Red Hill | 90.2 | 145.2 | NC 197 south – Burnsville | South end of NC 197 overlap |
| Mitchell | Red Hill | 90.4 | 145.5 | NC 197 north – Erwin | North end of NC 197 overlap |
| Mitchell | | 101.0 | 162.5 | SR 107 west – Erwin | Continuation into Tennessee; crosses through Iron Mountain Gap |
1.000 mi = 1.609 km; 1.000 km = 0.621 mi: Concurrency terminus
