= Buck Creek Gap =

Mountain pass along the Blue Ridge Mountains

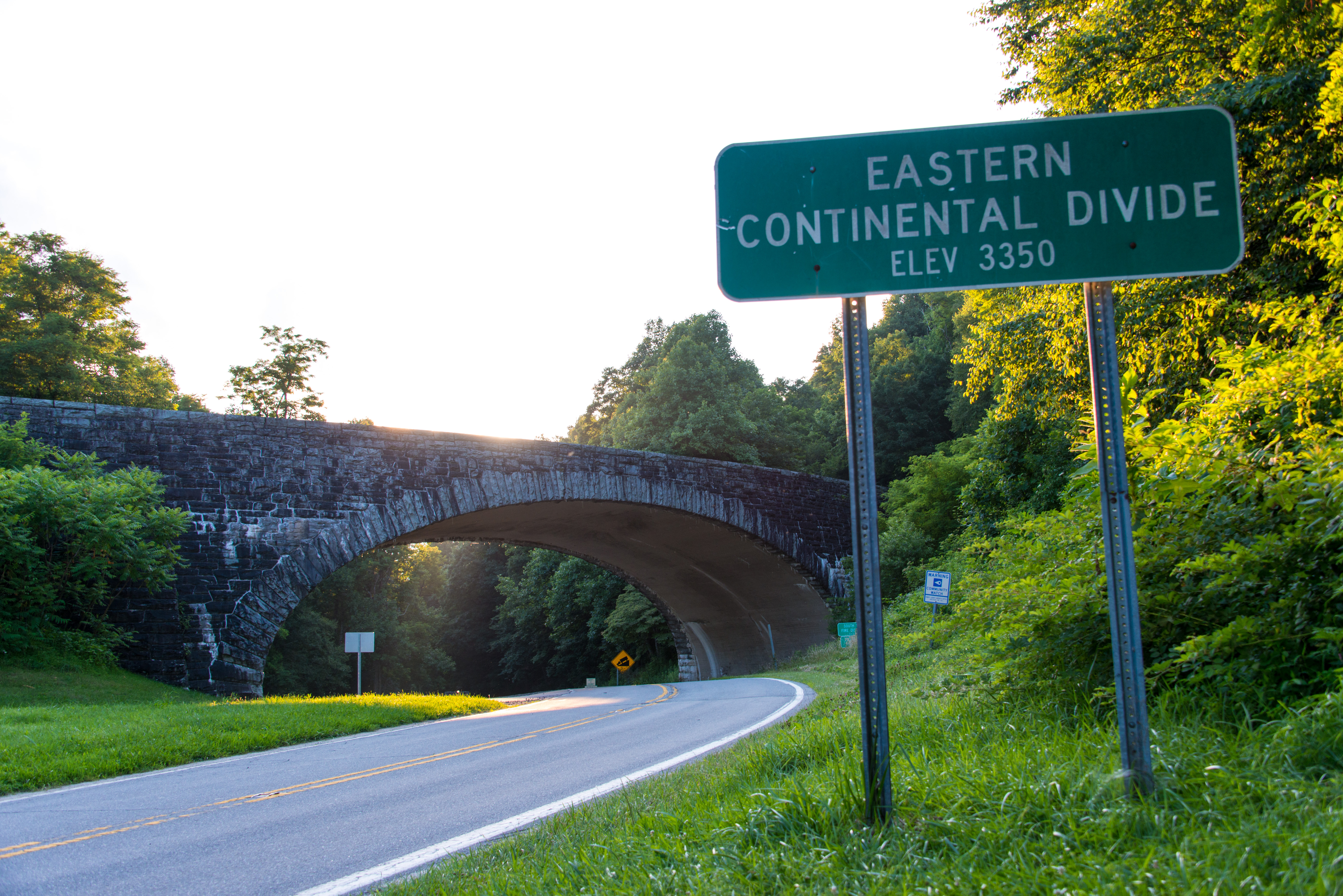
- Eastern Continental Divide

- Location within North Carolina
- Elevation: 3,402 feet (1,037 m)
- Traversed by: NC 80 / Blue Ridge Pkwy

Third Approach
- Location: North Carolina; United States
- Range: Blue Ridge Mountains
- Coordinates: 35°46′15″N 82°09′52″W
- Topo map: USGS Celo

Buck Creek Gap (el. 3,402 ft (1,037 m)) is a mountain pass along the Blue Ridge Mountains. NC 80 connects with the Blue Ridge Parkway at the gap, where it travelers can go either towards Burnsville, Marion, Mount Mitchell or Little Switzerland. A scenic overlook is located at the gap, along NC 80; which is sometimes also used as a staging area for motorcycle enthusiasts. The gap is also along the Eastern Continental Divide and the McDowell–Yancey county line.
