= Gillespie Gap =

Mountain Pass in Blue Ridge Mountains, USA

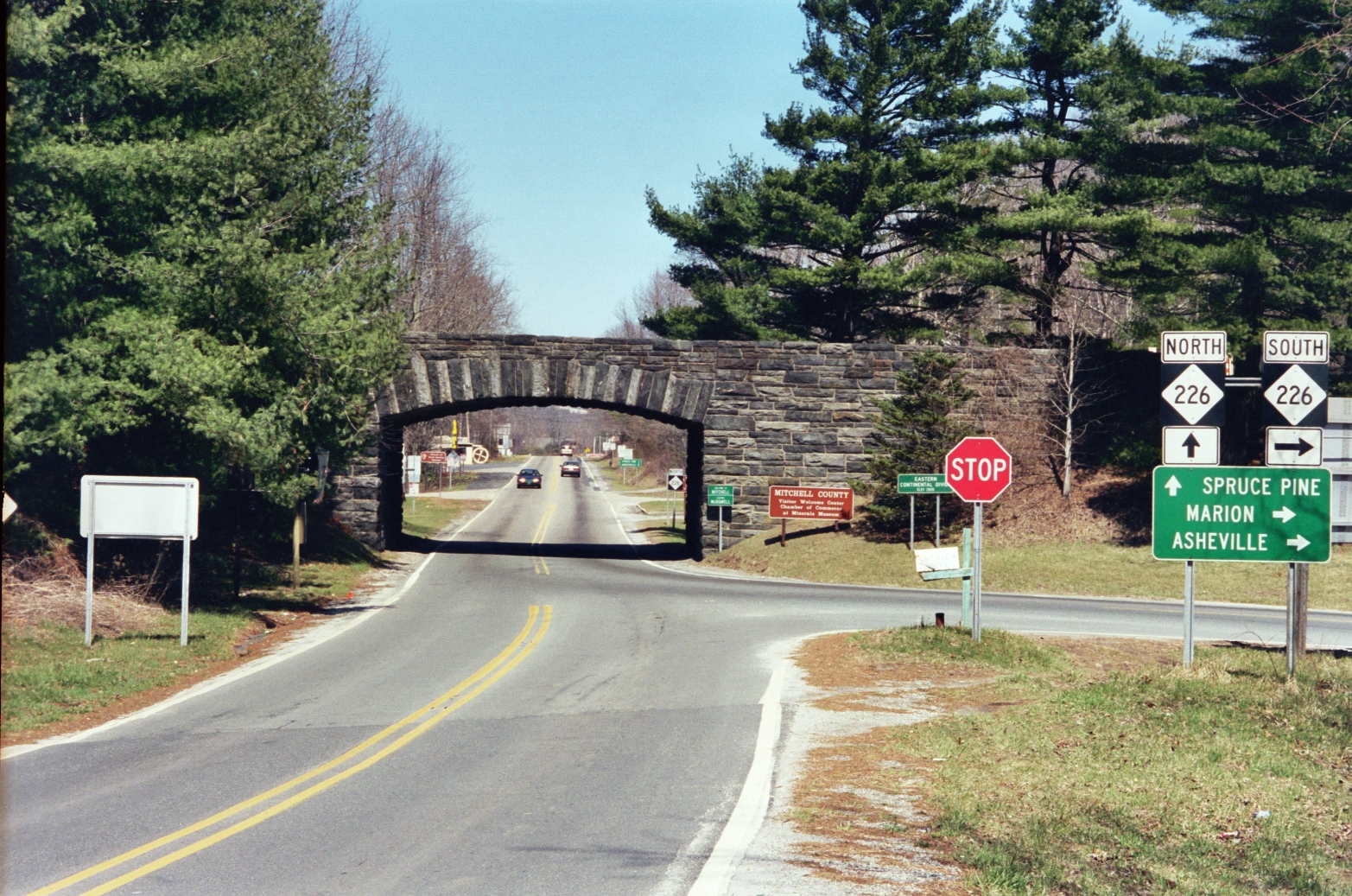
- NC 226/NC 226A intersect at Gillespie Gap

- Location within North Carolina
- Elevation: 2,805 feet (855 m)
- Traversed by: NC 226 / NC 226A; Blue Ridge Parkway

Third Approach
- Location: North Carolina; United States
- Range: Blue Ridge Mountains
- Coordinates: 35°51′09″N 82°03′03″W
- Topo map: USGS Little Switzerland

Gillespie Gap (el. 2,805 ft (855 m))is a mountain pass along the Blue Ridge Mountains. In 1780 some of the Overmountain Men crossed the pass on their way to Kings Mountain.

NC 226 traverses through the gap, which connects Marion and Spruce Pine. Intersecting at the gap is NC 226A, which goes to nearby Little Switzerland. The Blue Ridge Parkway (milepost 330.9) also passes through the gap, providing scenic views along the adjacent ridge lines. The gap is also along the Eastern Continental Divide and the McDowell–Mitchell county line.
