= Jim Sockwell =

American potter and artist (1942–2026)

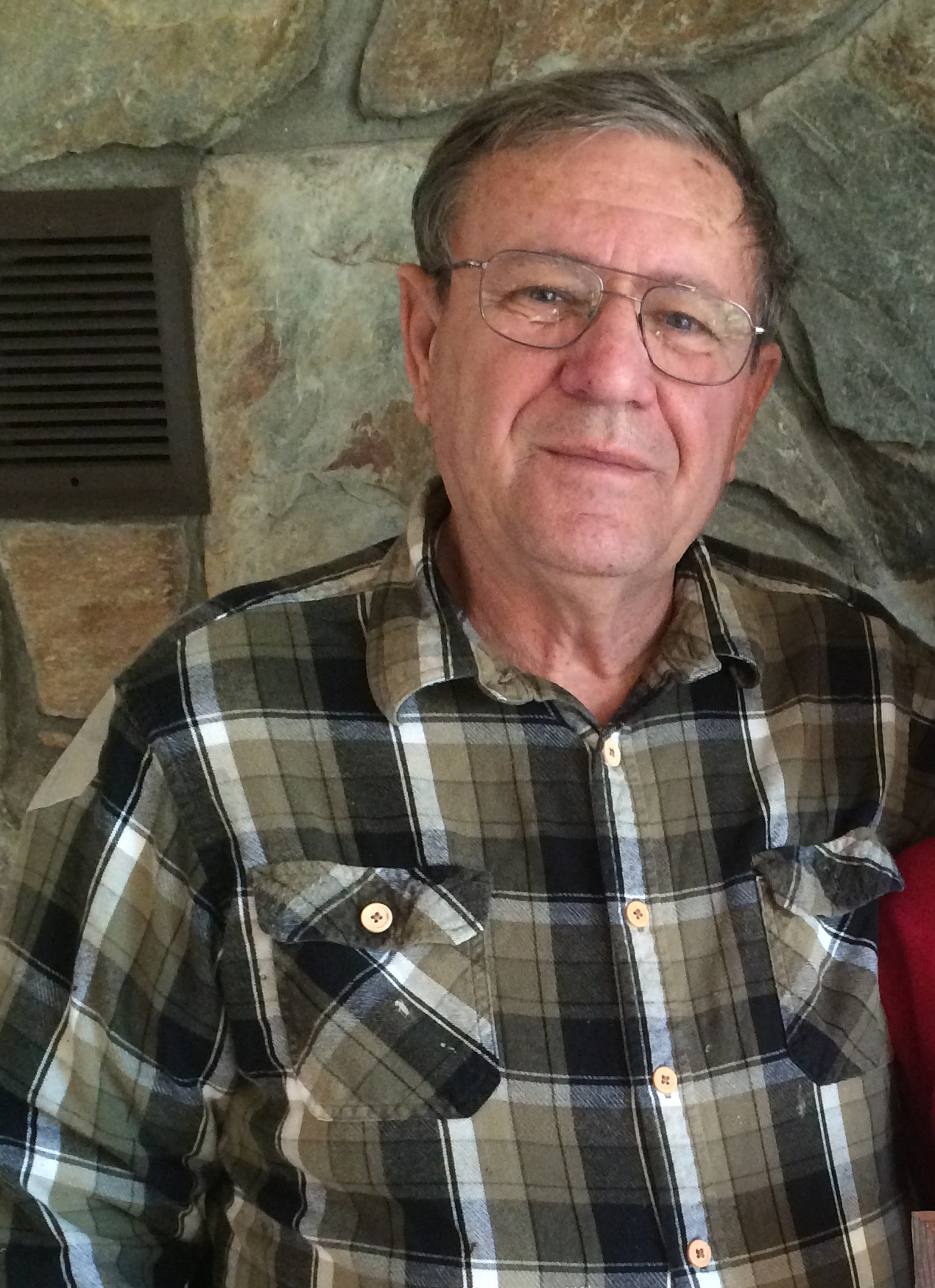
- Sockwell in 2013
- Born: James Alexander Sockwell; April 20, 1942; Tuscumbia, Alabama, U.S.
- Died: September 1, 2026 (aged 84); Morganton, North Carolina, U.S.
- Education: Middle Tennessee State University
- Years active: 1965–2025
- Known for: Ceramics, Marquetry
- Spouse: Sheilah Sockwell (m. 1962)
- Children: 2
- Awards: Juried member of the Southern Highland Craft Guild

James Alexander Sockwell (April 20, 1942 – September 1, 2026) was an American pottery and marquetry craftsman who spent most of his adult life in Spruce Pine, North Carolina. Sockwell was a juried member of the Southern Highland Craft Guild in both disciplines.

== Early life ==
Sockwell studied art at Middle Tennessee State University. Afterwards, he owned and operated Tanglewood Pottery in Murfreesboro, Tennessee. In 1972, he moved his family to Spruce Pine, North Carolina, and opened a pottery studio in Gillespie Gap, North Carolina.

== Career ==
=== Ceramic Period: 1965–1978 ===
Sockwell's Ceramic Period (1965–1978) is characterized by Asian-inspired design and live demonstrations in Gillespie Gap, North Carolina. He specialized in functional stoneware pottery that was fired in a reduction atmosphere. His pieces were hand-signed "Sockwell" that may also include a date.

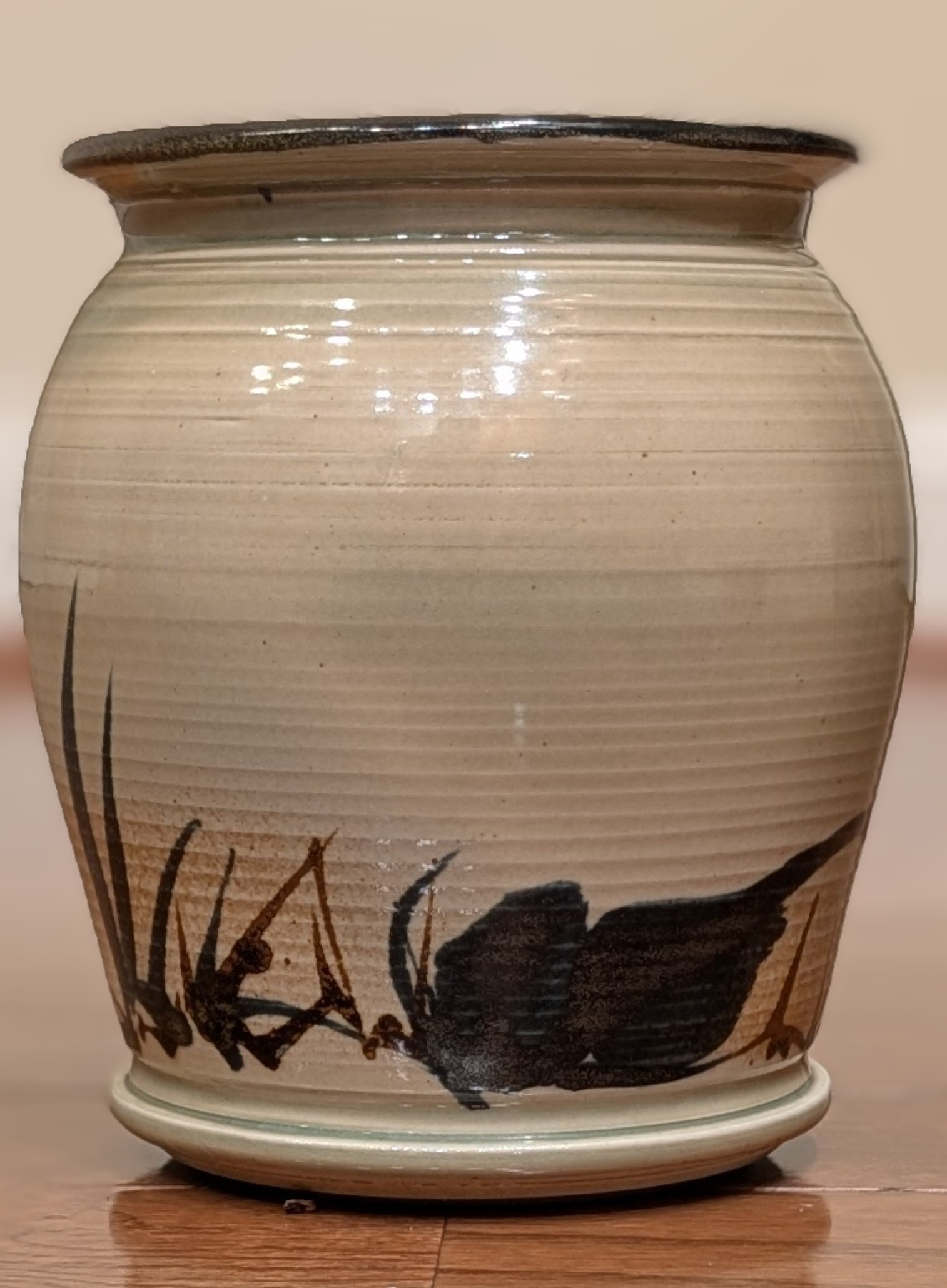
Sockwell vase from 1976. Diameter: 6 in (15 cm), Height: 6.75 in (17.1 cm)

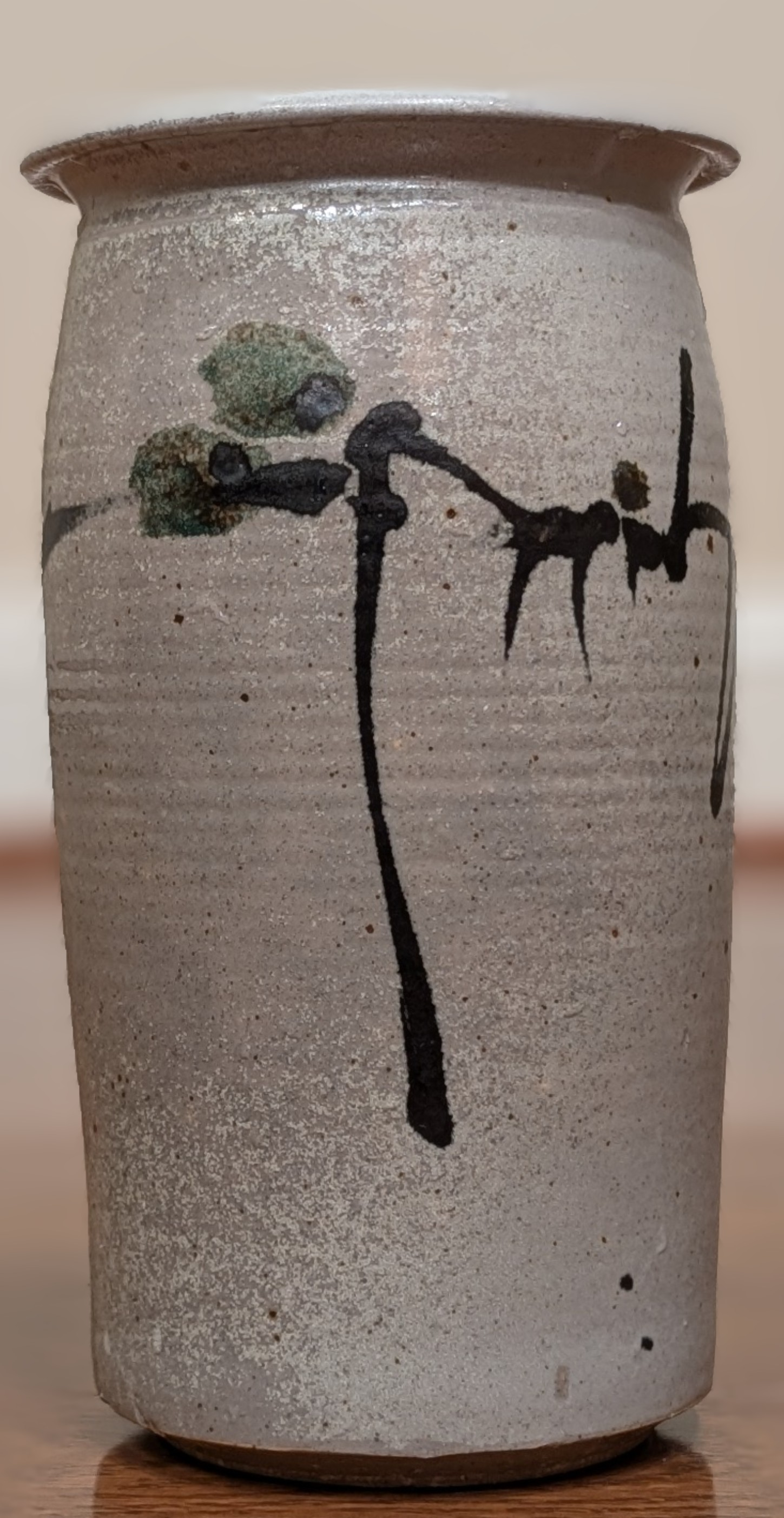
Sockwell vase from 1985. Diameter: 4 in (10 cm), Height: 7.75 in (19.7 cm)

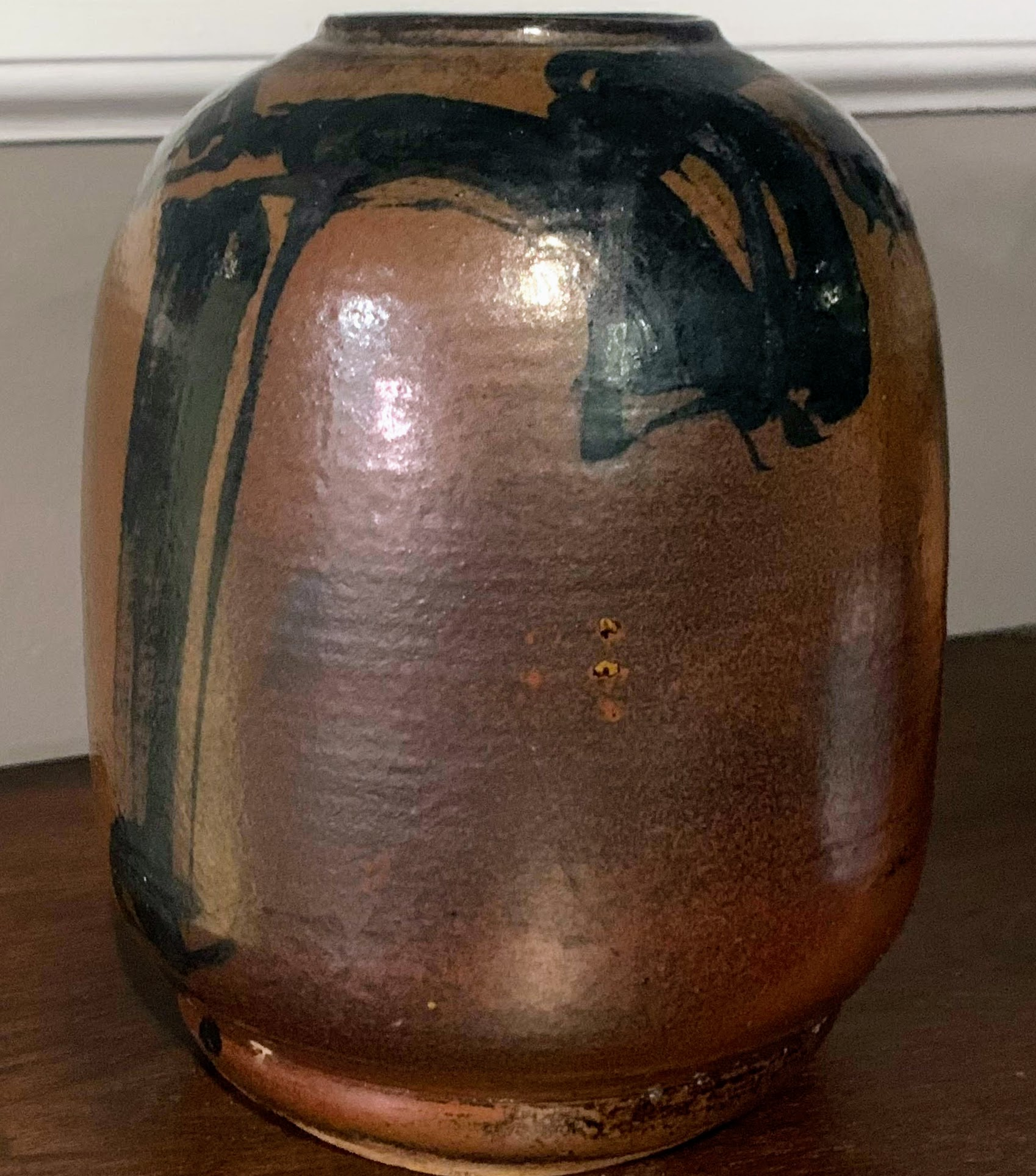
Sockwell vase, date unknonwn

=== Marquetry Period: 2005–2025 ===
Sockwell's marquetry period started after retirement from surveying. He used exotic and native wood veneer to make realistic scenes. The woods were almost exclusively their natural color, but in select instances Sockwell would use wood that had been dyed. The wood grain was carefully incorporated into the design.

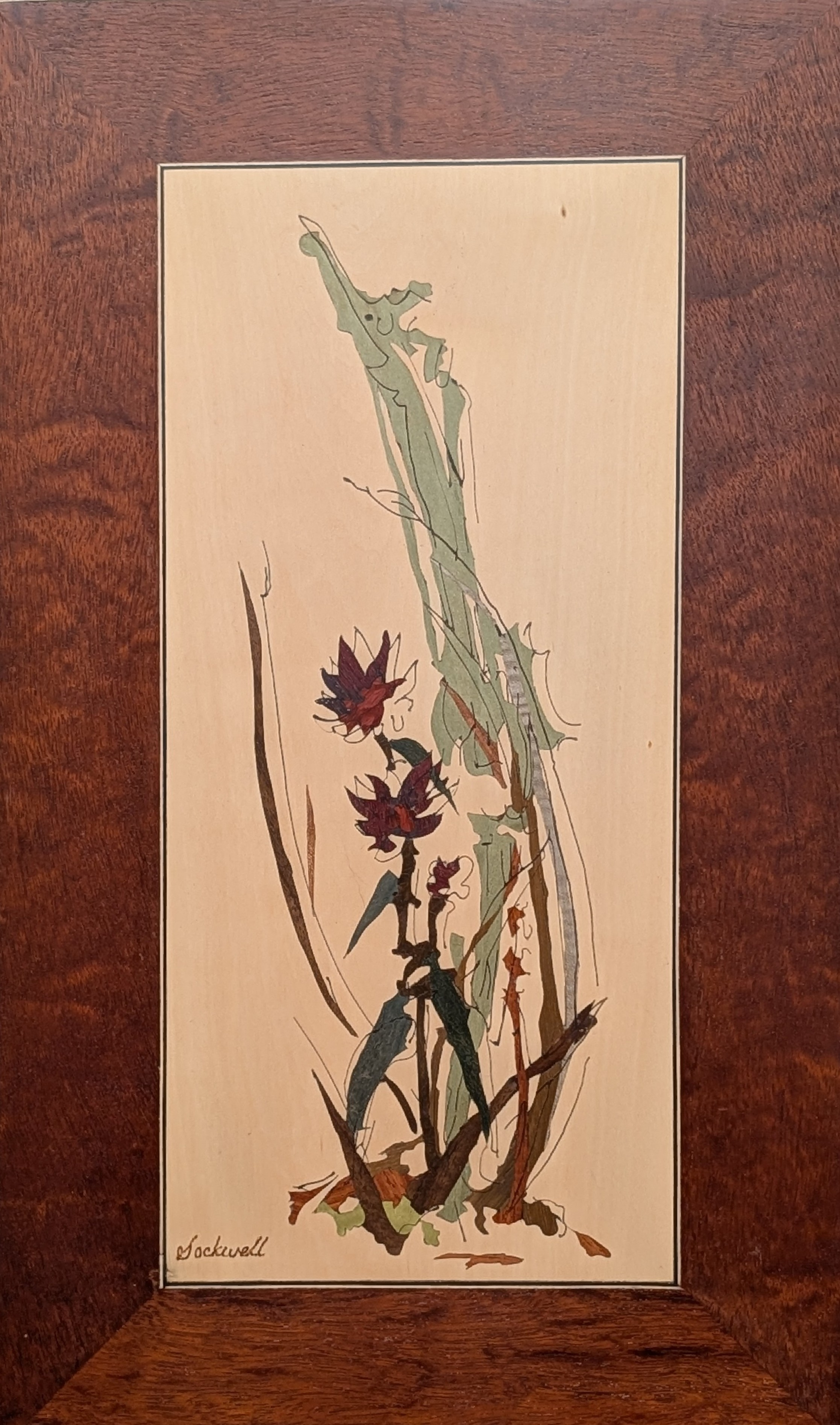
Sockwell flowers. Wood with wood veneer. 10 in × 17.25 in (25.4 cm × 43.8 cm)

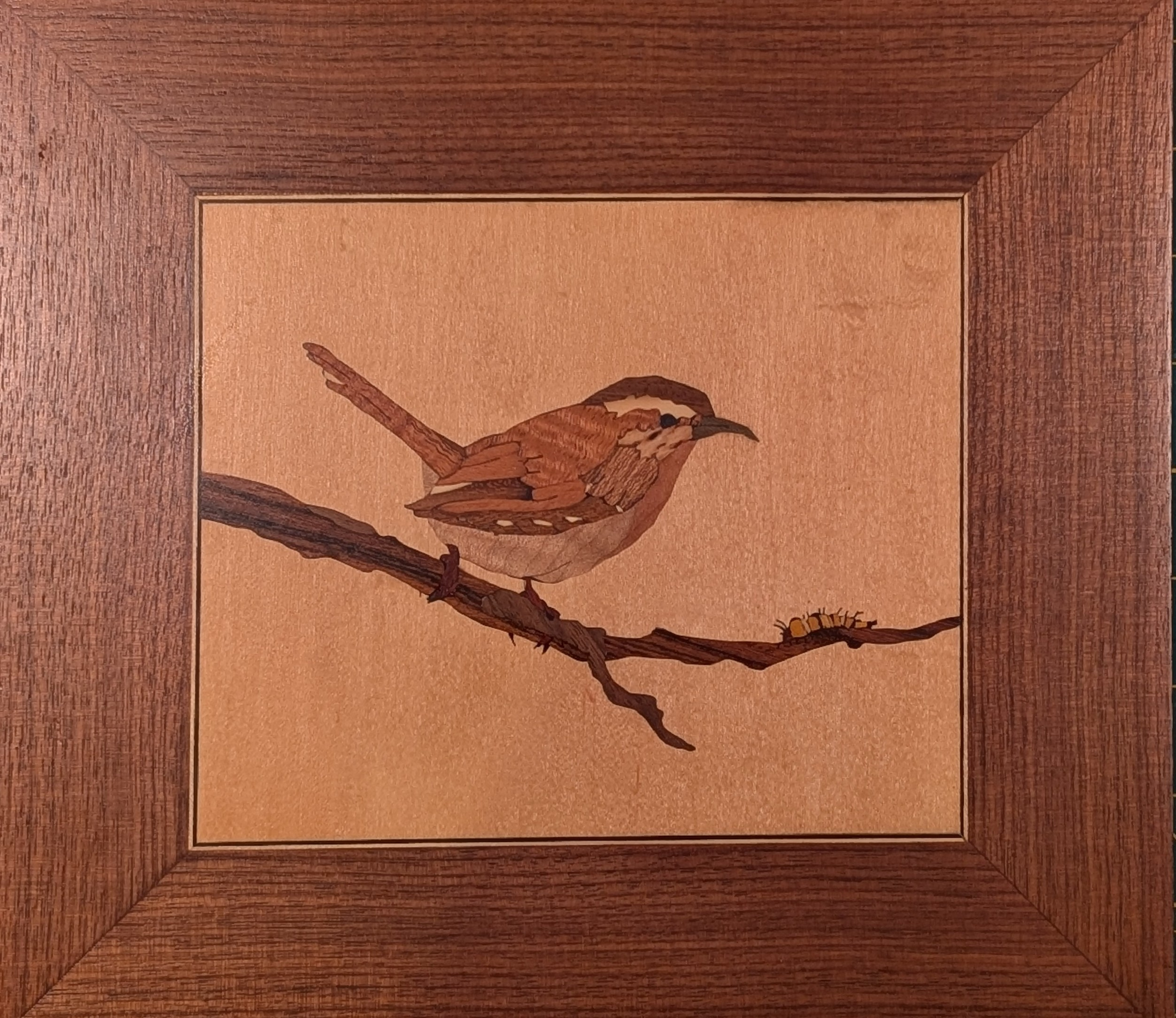
Sockwell bird and caterpillar on a branch from 2008. 10.75 in × 9.75 in (27.3 cm × 24.8 cm)

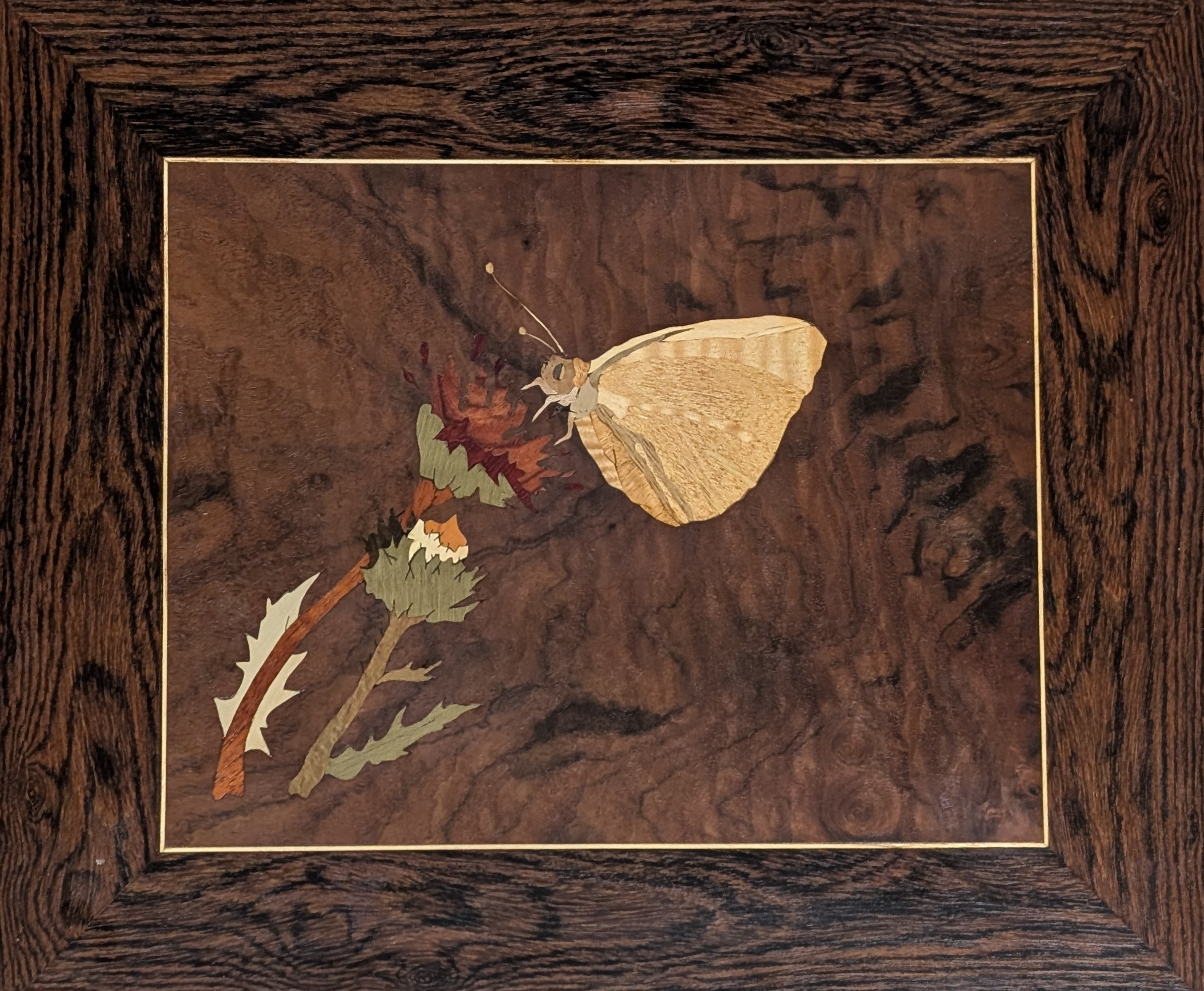
Sockwell moth, circa 2010. 15 in × 13 in (38 cm × 33 cm)

== Artistic legacy ==
Sockwell art is routinely sold on ebay and etsy.

== Death ==
Sockwell died in Morganton, North Carolina on September 1, 2026, at the age of 84.
