= Loafers Glory, North Carolina =

- Unincorporated community
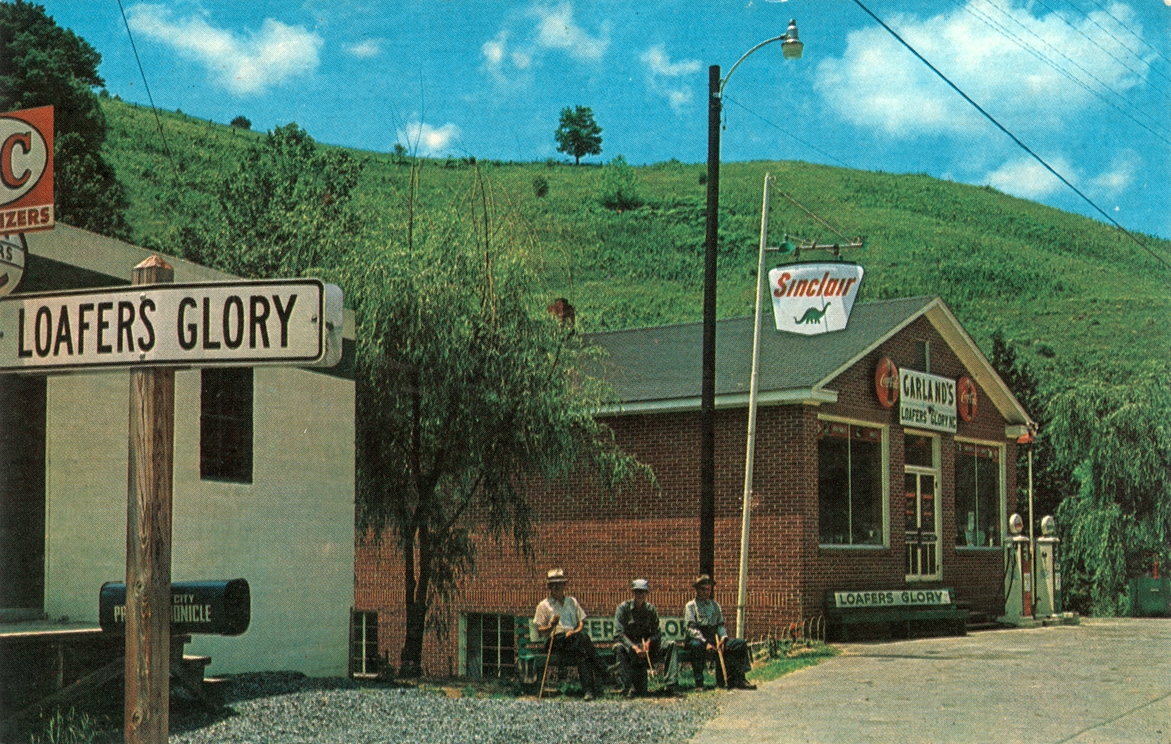
- Postcard of Loafers Glory

- Location within North Carolina Location within the United States
- Coordinates: 36°00′47″N 82°11′14″W
- Country: United States
- State: North Carolina
- County: Mitchell County
- Elevation: 2,313 ft (705 m)
- Time zone: UTC-5 (Eastern (EST))
  - Summer (DST): UTC-4 (EDT)
- ZIP Code: 28705 (Bakersville)
- Area code: 828
- GNIS feature ID: 1021254

Loafers Glory is an unincorporated community in Mitchell County, North Carolina, United States. Located at the intersection of NC 226 and NC 226A, along the banks of the North Toe River; 2.5 miles (4.0 km) west of Bakersville.

It was named for the idle, or loafing, men who were a fixture at the town's general store, while they waited for their corn to be ground at the Old Masters Mill.
