= Little Switzerland, North Carolina =

- Unincorporated community
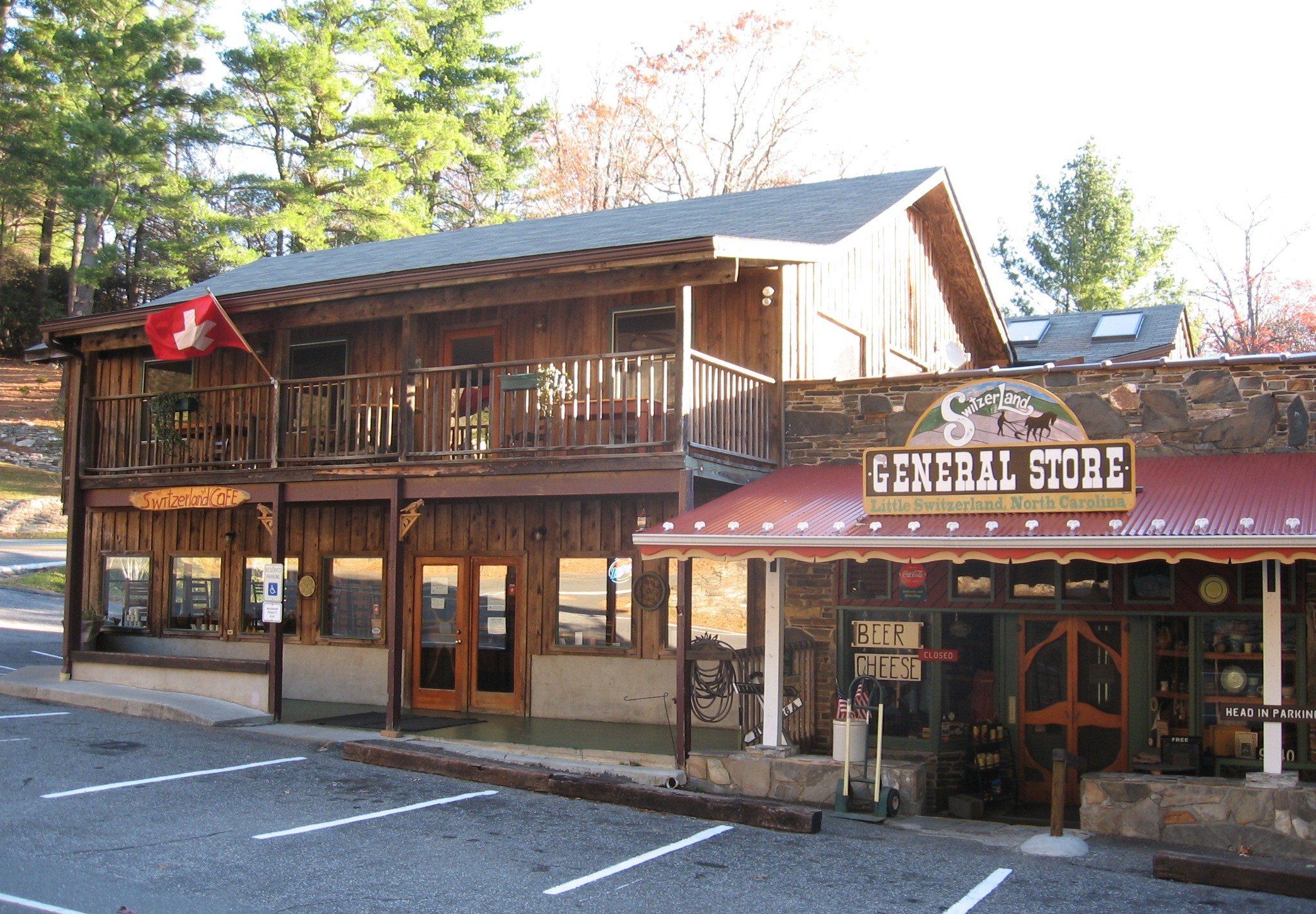
- Shops in downtown Little Switzerland

- Location within North Carolina Location within the United States
- Coordinates: 35°50′57″N 82°05′25″W
- Country: United States
- State: North Carolina
- Counties: McDowell, Mitchell
- Founded: 1910
- Named for: Switzerland
- Elevation: 3,468 ft (1,057 m)
- Time zone: UTC-5 (Eastern (EST))
  - Summer (DST): UTC-4 (EDT)
- ZIP Code: 28749
- Area code: 828
- GNIS feature ID: 1021241

Little Switzerland is an unincorporated community in McDowell and Mitchell counties of North Carolina, United States. It is located along North Carolina Highway 226A (NC 226A) off the Blue Ridge Parkway, directly north of Marion and south of Spruce Pine. The elevation is 3,468 feet (1,057 m) above sea level.

At this location, in 1909, the "Switzerland Company" was founded by North Carolina State Supreme Court Justice Heriot Clarkson to construct a resort village. Covenants in the rules included no alcohol and one house per lot.

== History ==
On January 17, 1964, the Switzerland Company filed a suit against the construction of the Blue Ridge Parkway noting that it was seeking a right of way of 800 feet wide through the resort and were not paying an adequate amount. The suit was settled with the Parkway getting 200 feet wide access and paying $25,000. It is now the narrowest point on the Parkway in North Carolina. The access to the Switzerland Inn is one of only two commercial access roads on the parkway; the other being Pisgah Inn at mile post 408. There were other skirmishes between the resort and parkway including the parkway closing the road to Kilmichael (pronounced Kill-michael) Tower built by Little Switzerland atop Grassy Mountain. Little Switzerland lost the fight and the tower fell into disrepair. Its base has since been turned into a vacation rental.

The group got the Carolina, Clinchfield, and Ohio Railroad to locate a station approximately 4 miles from the community. They built a toll road to it - Etchoe (pronounced Et-chō) Pass Road. The tolls did not last long although the booths are still visible. It is now NC 226A.

The original Switzerland Inn was razed in the 1960s and a modern motor court was built by William Cessna.

Its naming illustrates the gradual change in meaning of the 19th century term little Switzerland from an area of limestone formations to one of mountainous appearance.

The Church of the Resurrection was added to the National Register of Historic Places in 1999.

== See also ==
- Woody's Knob
