= Woodlawn, North Carolina =

- Census-designated place
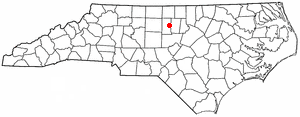
- Location of Woodlawn, North Carolina
- Coordinates: 36°06′57″N 79°17′23″W
- Country: United States
- State: North Carolina
- County: Alamance

Area
  - Total: 3.57 sq mi (9.24 km^{2})
  - Land: 3.29 sq mi (8.53 km^{2})
  - Water: 0.27 sq mi (0.71 km^{2})
- Elevation: 535 ft (163 m)

Population (2020)
  - Total: 912
  - Density: 277/sq mi (106.9/km^{2})
- Time zone: UTC-5 (Eastern (EST))
  - Summer (DST): UTC-4 (EDT)
- ZIP code: 27302
- Area codes: 919 and 984
- FIPS code: 37-75375
- GNIS feature ID: 2403039

Woodlawn is a census-designated place in Alamance County, North Carolina, United States. As of the 2020 census, Woodlawn had a population of 912.

== Geography ==
According to the United States Census Bureau, the CDP has a total area of 3.7 square miles (9.5 km^{2}), of which 3.4 square miles (8.9 km^{2}) is land and 0.23 square miles (0.6 km^{2}), or 6.60%, is water.

== Demographics ==
Historical population
Census	Pop.	Note	%±
2020	912		—
U.S. Decennial Census

As of the census of 2000, there were 1,051 people, 408 households, and 321 families residing in the CDP. The population density was 210.7 inhabitants per square mile (81.4/km^{2}). There were 431 housing units at an average density of 86.4 per square mile (33.4/km^{2}). The racial makeup of the CDP was 76.50% White, 21.03% African American, 0.48% Native American, 0.38% from other races, and 1.62% from two or more races. Hispanic or Latino of any race were 1.05% of the population.

There were 408 households, out of which 33.3% had children under the age of 18 living with them, 65.0% were married couples living together, 10.0% had a female householder with no husband present, and 21.3% were non-families. 17.9% of all households were made up of individuals, and 7.8% had someone living alone who was 65 years of age or older. The average household size was 2.58 and the average family size was 2.94.

In the CDP, the population was spread out, with 23.9% under the age of 18, 5.3% from 18 to 24, 29.3% from 25 to 44, 29.0% from 45 to 64, and 12.5% who were 65 years of age or older. The median age was 41 years. For every 100 females, there were 101.0 males. For every 100 females age 18 and over, there were 95.6 males.

The median income for a household in the CDP was $54,130, and the median income for a family was $67,303. Males had a median income of $39,471 versus $33,864 for females. The per capita income for the CDP was $25,366. About 2.1% of families and 3.7% of the population were below the poverty line, including 2.2% of those under age 18 and none of those age 65 or over.
