= North Toe River =

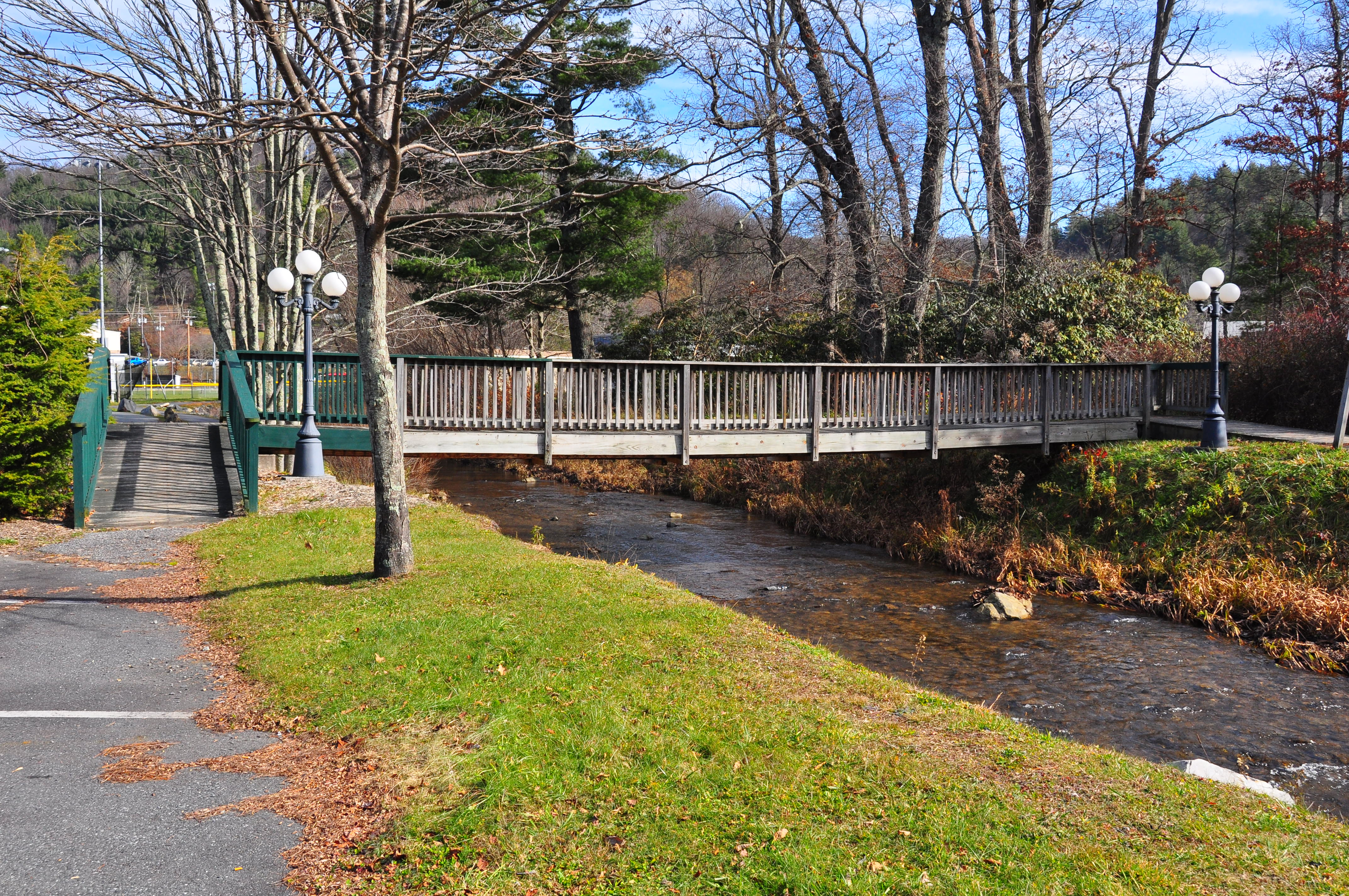
- Bridge over the North Toe River in Newland

- Location of the mouth of North Toe River in North Carolina

Location
- Country: United States
- State: North Carolina
- Counties: Avery, Mitchell, Yancey

Physical characteristics
- Source: Sugar Gap
  - location: Sugar Mountain, North Carolina
  - coordinates: 36°07′47″N 81°53′13″W
  - elevation: 4,350 ft (1,330 m)
- Mouth: Nolichucky River
  - location: Huntdale, North Carolina
  - coordinates: 36°01′44″N 82°19′37″W
  - elevation: 2,021 ft (616 m)
- Length: 73.6 mi (118.4 km)
- Basin size: 1,146.22 square miles (2,968.7 km^{2})

Basin features
- Progression: North Toe → Nolichucky → French Broad → Tennessee → Ohio → Mississippi → Gulf of Mexico
- River system: French Broad River
- Tributaries
  - left: Kentucky Creek, Cow Camp Creek, Haw Branch, Row Branch, Squirrel Creek, Plumtree Creek, Pancake Branch, Clear Creek, Threemile Creek, Brushy Creek, Laurel Creek, Harris Creek, White Oak Branch, Rose Creek, Cathis Creek, Grassy Creek, English Creek, Big Branch, Wolf Branch, South Toe River, Chestnut Branch, Brush Creek, Pigpen Creek, Jacks Creek, Bee Branch, McKinney Branch, Cane River
  - right: Hickorynut Branch, Whiteoak Creek, Banjo Branch,Fall Branch, Horse Branch, Gooseneck Branch, Birchfield Creek, Race Path Branch, Whitaker Branch, Roaring Creek, Powdermill Creek, Doublehead Creek, Henson Creek, Justice Creek, Puatt Creek, Jones Creek, Little Laurel Branch, Bill Davenport Branch, Jake Creek, Beaver Creek, Pine Branch, Little Bear Creek, Lily Branch, Gouge Branch, Sink Hole Creek, Rose Creek, Cane Creek, Whitson Branch, Big Rock Creek, Raccoon Creek, Warrick Branch, Brummett Creek, Pigeonroost Creek, Cooper Branch, Rebels Creek

The North Toe River is the headwaters of the Nolichucky River and a tributary in the French Broad River basin. From its source at Sugar Gap, between Bald Mountain and Sugar Mountain, it flows 73.6 miles (118.4 km) westerly through Avery, Mitchell, and Yancey counties.

== History ==
The earliest inhabitants in the Toe River valley area were both the Catawba and Cherokee Indians; though neither lived in the area permanently, it is believed both tribes used the area as a hunting ground. In 1540, the first European to the area was the Spanish explorer Hernando de Soto. Evidence of his visit includes Spanish mining at the Sink Hole, Clarissa, and Horse Stomp mines in Mitchell County. In the late 1560s, Spanish explorer Juan Pardo also visited the area in an attempt to establish a land route to Zacatecas in present-day Mexico. In the 18th century, English, Scotch-Irish, and German settlers came to the area.

=== Legend of Estatoe ===
The name Toe is taken from its original name Estatoe, pronounced 'S - ta - toe', a native American name associated with the Estatoe trade route leading down from the North Carolina mountains through Brevard. There is a historical plaque in Brevard with information that affirms the route, which continues into Pendleton District (now Pickens County), South Carolina, where a village of the same name was located. Due to difficulty in pronouncing the name it was shortened over the years to Toe.

According to Cherokee Indian legend, the name is derived from an Indian chief's daughter, named Estatoe (pronounced 'S - ta - toe'), who fell in love with a warrior of a rival tribe. Because their love could never be accepted by either's families, they jumped from a precipice into the depths of a nearby river. In an alternative version, their love caused a bloody war between the tribes and Estatoe crafted a peace pipe with two stems in which both chiefs could smoke at once. The two rival chiefs assembled their respective followers on the bank of the river, and smoked till peace was concluded and Estatoe married her lover.

== Pollution ==
With Spruce Pine being the dividing line, the river upstream is considered in good health with a few tributaries impacted related to agricultural and development runoff. Downstream, the river has been impacted by legal and illegal wastewater discharges from mining operations in the area. In 2018, Quartz Corp. illegally discharged hundreds of gallons of hydrofluoric acid into the North Toe River causing a fish kill.

== See also ==
- List of North Carolina rivers
