= Spruce Pine, North Carolina =

Town in the United States

- Town
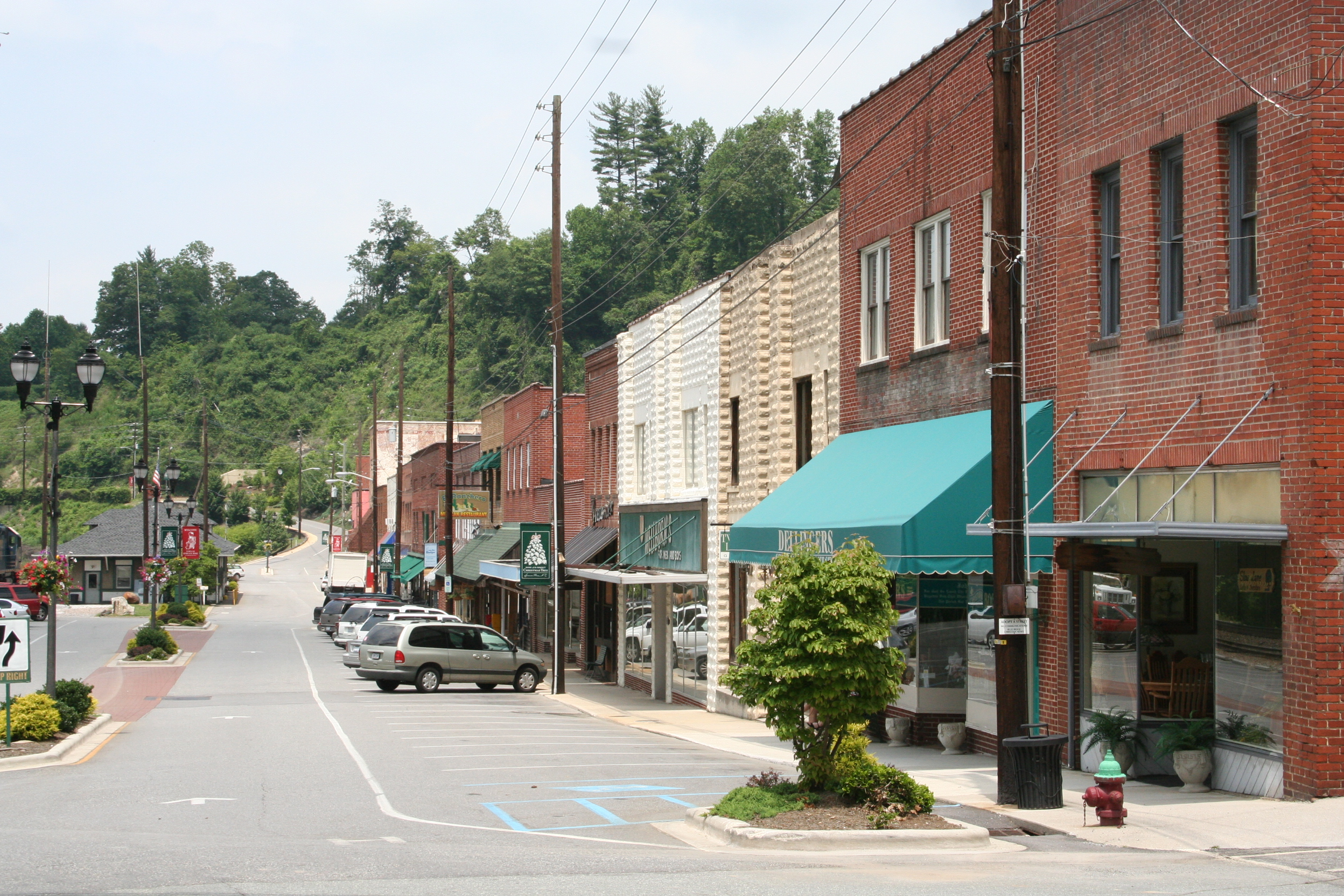
- Locust (Lower) Street in 2007

- Seal

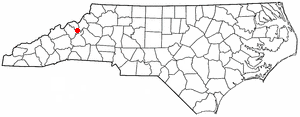
- Location in North Carolina
- Coordinates: 35°54′38″N 82°04′23″W
- Country: United States
- State: North Carolina
- County: Mitchell
- Incorporated: 1907
- Named for: The spruce pine

Government
  - Mayor: Beth Holmes

Area
  - Total: 4.06 sq mi (10.5 km^{2})
  - Land: 4.06 sq mi (10.5 km^{2})
  - Water: 0.00 sq mi (0 km^{2})
- Elevation: 2,612 ft (796 m)

Population (2020)
  - Total: 2,194
  - Density: 540.3/sq mi (208.6/km^{2})
- Time zone: UTC−5 (EST)
  - Summer (DST): UTC−4 (EDT)
- ZIP Code: 28777
- Area code: 828
- FIPS code: 37-64260
- GNIS feature ID: 2407391
- Website: www.townofsprucepine.com

Spruce Pine is the largest town in Mitchell County, North Carolina, United States. The population was 2,194 at the 2020 census.

The Spruce Pine Mining District is one of the only places in the world where high-purity quartz can be found.

== History ==
Spruce Pine was founded in 1907, when the Clinchfield Railroad made its way up the North Toe River from Erwin, Tennessee. The town was originally centered around a tavern operated by Isaac English, which was located on an old roadway that ran from Cranberry down to Marion, North Carolina. The Old English Inn still stands at its original location near the center of town.

The railroad, combined with a rapidly expanding mining industry (the town is the namesake of the famous Spruce Pine Mining District), made Spruce Pine the largest town in the Toe River Valley, as it became the hub of commerce and culture for the area. Spruce Pine was the home of The Feldspar Company and Spruce Pine Mica, and other major mining interests had operations in and around the town. The Spruce Pine Mining District has high-purity quartz, a mineral required in a variety of important products, such as semiconductors. Spruce Pine is the exclusive supplier of sand to Augusta National Golf Club.

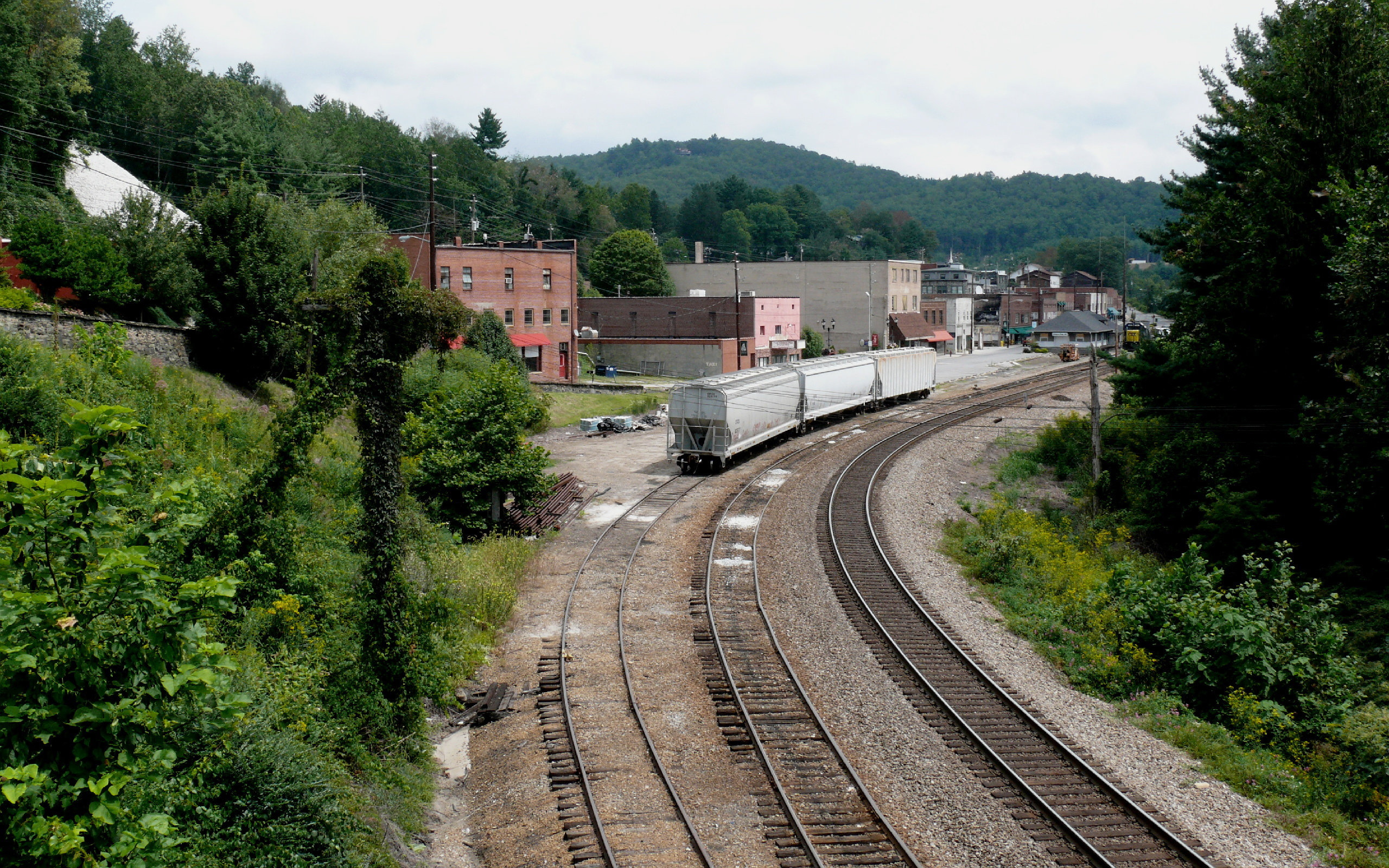
Railroad tracks and train station in Spruce Pine (2008)

With the decline in use of railroads to ship goods, along with increasing automation in the mining industry, the town recently has seen its fortunes dwindle and has undertaken a major effort to reinvent itself. Tourism has become a major economic force in the region, and the town's proximity to the Blue Ridge Parkway, combined with its location near the edge of the Blue Ridge Escarpment, has helped make Spruce Pine a travel destination for many. The town also boasts the moniker of "The Mineral City".

On August 4, 2007, the downtown area of Spruce Pine was threatened when an arsonist set fire to several buildings downtown. The fires, which brought firefighters from four counties around Spruce Pine, severely damaged the building that housed Cheapskates Music on Lower Street and caused some tense moments when it seemed that the fires might spread out of control and consume the downtown area.

The town suffered flooding and devastation as a result of Hurricane Helene in 2024.

The Downtown Spruce Pine Historic District and Gunter Building are listed on the National Register of Historic Places.

== Geography ==
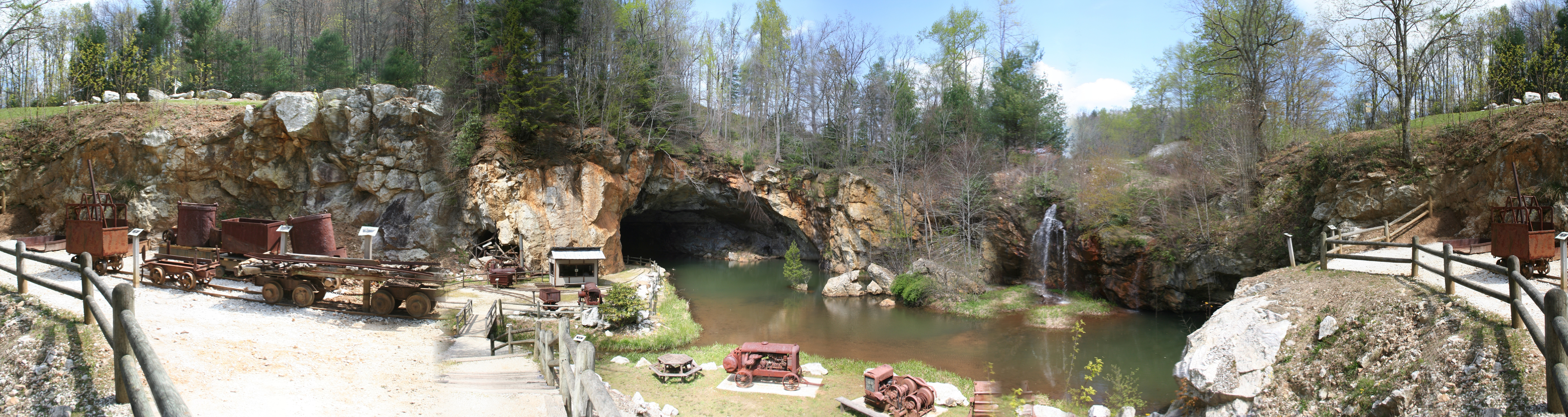
Abandoned Bon Ami mine (2012)

Spruce Pine is in southern Mitchell County, in the valley of the North Toe River. The town is 4 miles (6 km) north of the Blue Ridge Parkway, 50 miles (80 km) northeast of Asheville, and 36 miles (58 km) southwest of Boone.

U.S. Route 19E passes through the southern part of the town, bypassing the downtown area. US 19E leads west 14 miles (23 km) to Burnsville and north 35 miles (56 km) to Elizabethton, Tennessee. North Carolina Highway 226 joins US 19E passing through Spruce Pine; it leads northwest 11 miles (18 km) to Bakersville, the Mitchell county seat, and south over the crest of the Blue Ridge Mountains 19 miles (31 km) to Marion.

According to the U.S. Census Bureau, the town of Spruce Pine has a total area of 4.1 square miles (10.6 km^{2}), all of it recorded as land. The North Toe River, which passes through the center of town, is a northwest-flowing tributary of the Nolichucky River, which continues west through the mountains into Tennessee.

=== Climate ===
Climate data for SPRUCE PINE 2 NE, NC, 1991-2020 normals
| Month | Jan | Feb | Mar | Apr | May | Jun | Jul | Aug | Sep | Oct | Nov | Dec | Year |
|---|---|---|---|---|---|---|---|---|---|---|---|---|---|
| Mean daily maximum °F (°C) | 44.6 (7.0) | 47.5 (8.6) | 55.0 (12.8) | 64.0 (17.8) | 71.4 (21.9) | 77.5 (25.3) | 81.2 (27.3) | 79.6 (26.4) | 73.8 (23.2) | 65.1 (18.4) | 55.8 (13.2) | 48.4 (9.1) | 63.7 (17.6) |
| Daily mean °F (°C) | 34.0 (1.1) | 36.6 (2.6) | 43.4 (6.3) | 51.6 (10.9) | 59.9 (15.5) | 67.1 (19.5) | 70.6 (21.4) | 69.3 (20.7) | 63.3 (17.4) | 53.4 (11.9) | 43.7 (6.5) | 37.7 (3.2) | 52.5 (11.4) |
| Mean daily minimum °F (°C) | 23.5 (−4.7) | 25.6 (−3.6) | 31.8 (−0.1) | 39.2 (4.0) | 48.3 (9.1) | 56.7 (13.7) | 60.0 (15.6) | 59.1 (15.1) | 52.9 (11.6) | 41.7 (5.4) | 31.5 (−0.3) | 26.9 (−2.8) | 41.4 (5.2) |
| Average precipitation inches (mm) | 4.54 (115) | 3.54 (90) | 5.23 (133) | 5.48 (139) | 5.12 (130) | 5.03 (128) | 5.45 (138) | 5.48 (139) | 5.08 (129) | 3.79 (96) | 3.85 (98) | 4.63 (118) | 57.22 (1,453) |
| Average precipitation days (≥ 0.01 in) | 0.0 | 0.0 | 0.0 | 0.0 | 0.0 | 0.0 | 0.0 | 0.0 | 0.0 | 0.0 | 0.0 | 0.0 | 0.0 |
Source: NOAA

== Demographics ==
Historical population
| Census | Pop. | Note | %± |
|---|---|---|---|
| 1920 | 717 | | — |
| 1930 | 1,546 | | 115.6% |
| 1940 | 1,968 | | 27.3% |
| 1950 | 2,280 | | 15.9% |
| 1960 | 2,504 | | 9.8% |
| 1970 | 2,333 | | −6.8% |
| 1980 | 2,282 | | −2.2% |
| 1990 | 2,010 | | −11.9% |
| 2000 | 2,030 | | 1.0% |
| 2010 | 2,175 | | 7.1% |
| 2020 | 2,194 | | 0.9% |
U.S. Decennial Census

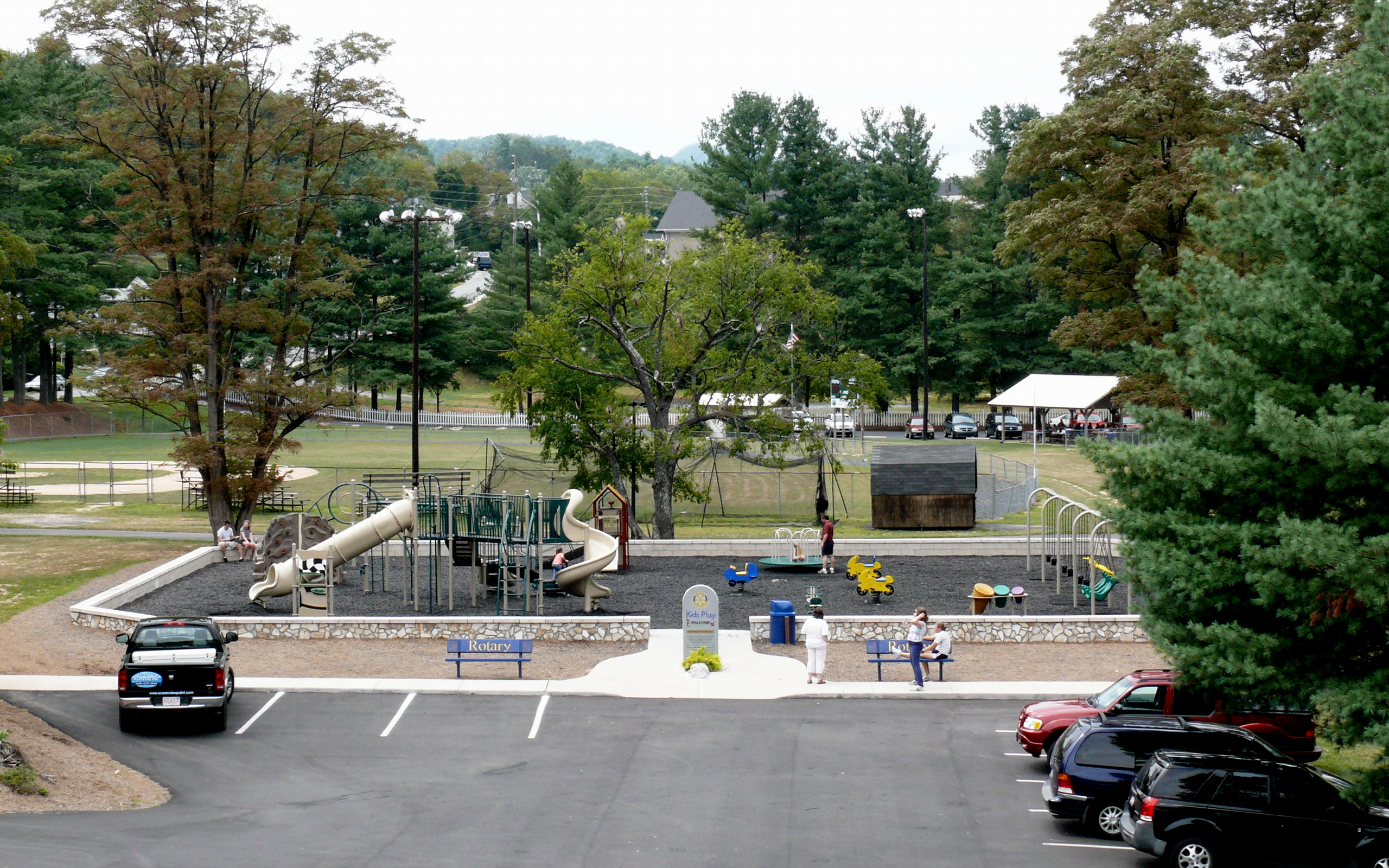
Community park in Spruce Pine

=== 2020 census ===
As of the 2020 census, Spruce Pine had a population of 2,194. The median age was 43.5 years. 21.8% of residents were under the age of 18 and 22.7% of residents were 65 years of age or older. For every 100 females there were 88.5 males, and for every 100 females age 18 and over there were 85.3 males age 18 and over.

0.0% of residents lived in urban areas, while 100.0% lived in rural areas.

There were 920 households in Spruce Pine, including 535 families. Of all households, 28.5% had children under the age of 18 living in them, 41.4% were married-couple households, 19.9% were households with a male householder and no spouse or partner present, and 32.8% were households with a female householder and no spouse or partner present. About 33.2% of all households were made up of individuals and 14.5% had someone living alone who was 65 years of age or older.

There were 1,064 housing units, of which 13.5% were vacant. The homeowner vacancy rate was 1.6% and the rental vacancy rate was 12.3%.

Spruce Pine racial composition
| Race | Number | Percentage |
|---|---|---|
| White (non-Hispanic) | 1,833 | 83.55% |
| Black or African American (non-Hispanic) | 16 | 0.73% |
| Native American | 9 | 0.41% |
| Asian | 10 | 0.46% |
| Other/Mixed | 88 | 4.01% |
| Hispanic or Latino | 238 | 10.85% |

=== 2000 census ===
According to the census of 2000, there were 2,030 people, 888 households, and 575 families residing in the town. The population density was 522.0 people per square mile (201.5 people/km^{2}). There were 968 housing units at an average density of 248.9 per square mile (96.1/km^{2}). The racial makeup of the town was 96.35% White, 0.39% African American, 0.54% Native American, 0.05% Asian, 2.27% from other races, and 0.39% from two or more races. Hispanic or Latino of any race were 3.79% of the population.

There were 888 households, out of which 27.3% had children under the age of 18 living with them, 48.8% were married couples living together, 12.5% had a female householder with no husband present, and 35.2% were non-families. 32.1% of all households were made up of individuals, and 16.8% had someone living alone who was 65 years of age or older. The average household size was 2.29 and the average family size was 2.89.

In the town, the population was spread out, with 23.3% under the age of 18, 8.3% from 18 to 24, 26.6% from 25 to 44, 22.3% from 45 to 64, and 19.7% who were 65 years of age or older. The median age was 40 years. For every 100 females, there were 88.1 males. For every 100 females age 18 and over, there were 84.6 males.

The median income for a household in the town was $24,766, and the median income for a family was $33,902. Males had a median income of $22,324 versus $22,375 for females. The per capita income for the town was $15,440. About 12.4% of families and 17.0% of the population were below the poverty line, including 30.5% of those under age 18 and 10.1% of those age 65 or over.

== Government ==
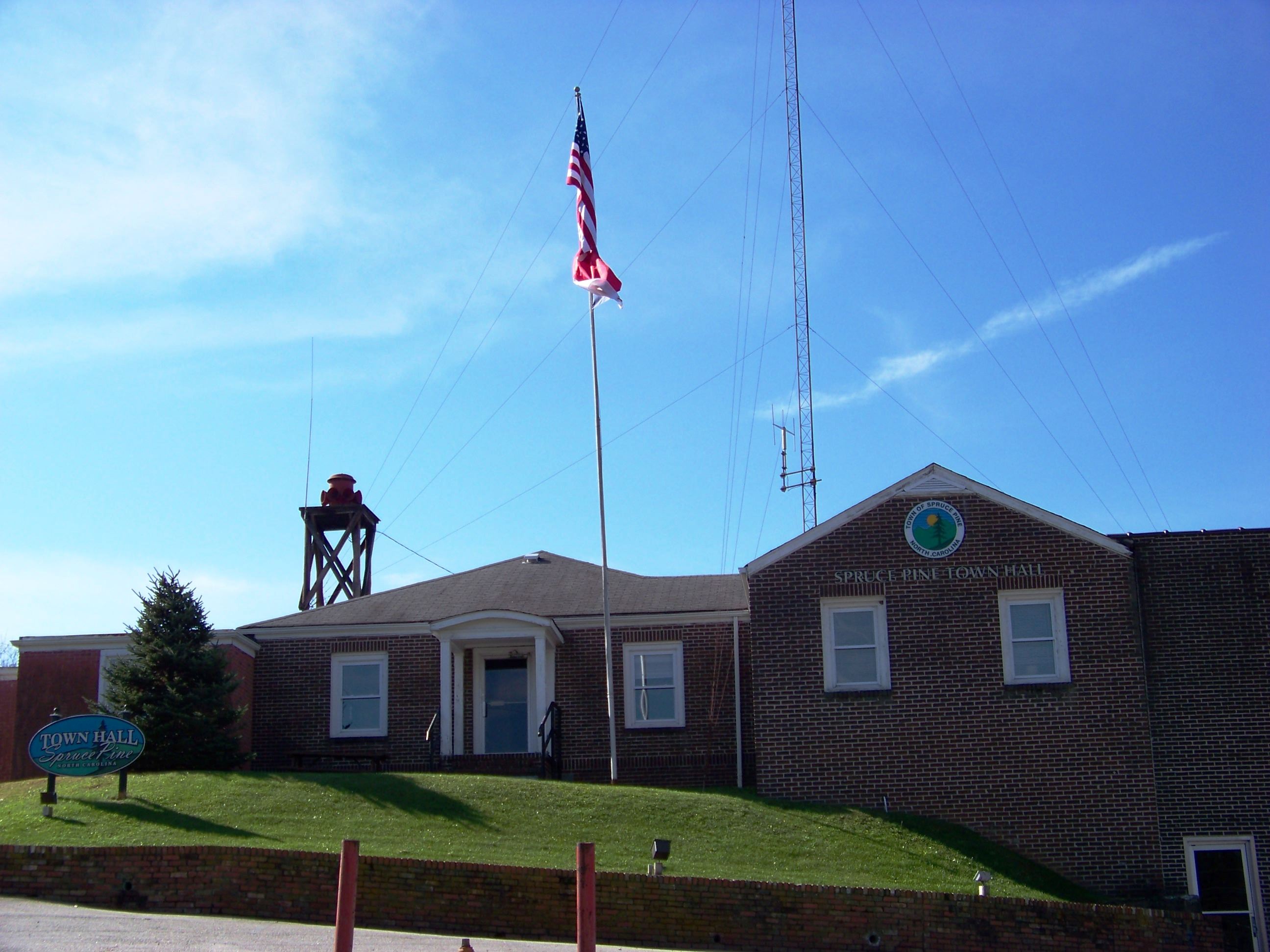
Town hall

In 1998, the medium-security men's state prisons Mountain View Correctional Institution and Avery-Mitchell Correctional Institution opened at the Avery-Mitchell County line.

== Education ==
Spruce Pine is home to five schools: Greenlee Primary (K-2), Deyton Elementary (3-5), Harris Middle (6-8), Tri- County Christian School and the Spruce Pine Montessori School (18 months - 6th grade). Secondary education for Spruce Pine students is at Mitchell High School, located in the Ledger community of Mitchell County.

Mayland Community College also calls Spruce Pine home, just outside the city limits to the east on the Avery County line. Founded by an act of the North Carolina General Assembly in 1971, Mayland hosts some 35 curriculum programs and provides vocational and technical training, along with college transfer opportunities to residents of the region.

East Carolina University Dental School announced a facility would open in 2014 on the Blue Ridge Regional Hospital campus to serve Western North Carolina residents in the Mayland area (Mitchell, Avery and Yancey Counties). This facility is one of five facilities proposed throughout the state of North Carolina.

== Infrastructure ==
=== Transport ===
Beginning in 2014, the North Carolina Department of Transportation began widening U.S. Route 19E, which is the major corridor linking the towns of Spruce Pine and Burnsville to Interstate 26. The widened highway has transformed a two-lane highway to a divided four-lane featuring grassy medians and turn lanes. The widening project was completed in 2020. Spruce Pine is served by the Avery County Airport, located 4 miles northeast of the town.

=== Hospital ===
In 1955, Blue Ridge Community Hospital opened in Spruce Pine. It eventually was renamed Blue Ridge Regional Hospital, and was absorbed by Mission Health System. It serves Mitchell and Yancey Counties and upper McDowell and lower Avery Counties.

== Media ==
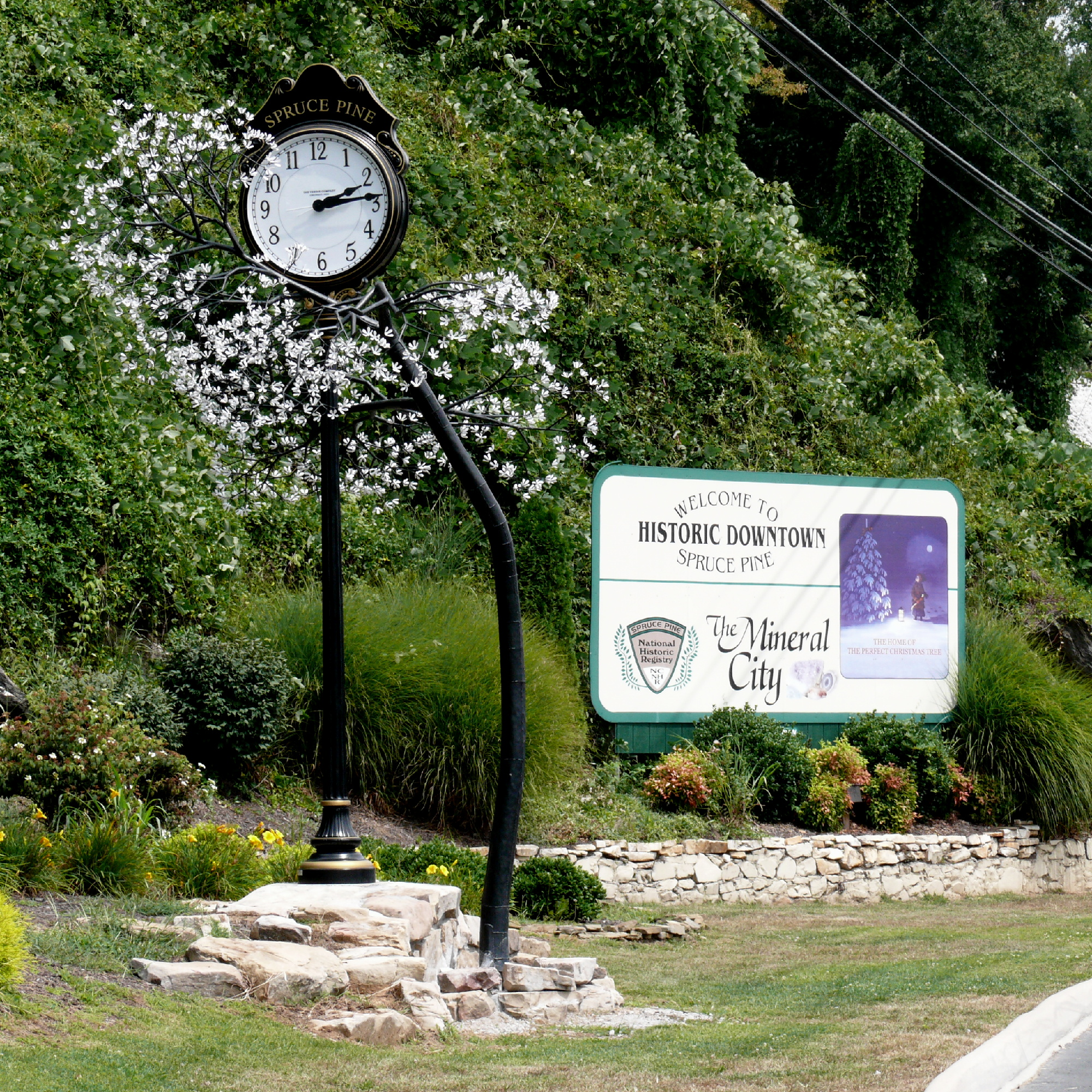
Entrance to Historic Downtown Spruce Pine.

Spruce Pine is home to The Mitchell News-Journal, a weekly newspaper printed by Community Newspapers, Inc., and to WTOE radio, at 1470 kHz on the AM dial and 101.1 FM. The radio station operates 24 hours a day and is an ABC Radio affiliate. It is owned by Mountain Valley Media, based in Burnsville.

== Notable people ==
- Indigo De Souza, indie rock musician; raised in Spruce Pine
- Phillip D. Frye, member of the North Carolina General Assembly
- Ralph Hise, member of the North Carolina Senate
- Gaylord Perry; Major League Baseball pitcher, Baseball Hall of Fame member
- Jim Sockwell, pottery and marquetry craftsman
- Bill Szymczyk, music producer and technical engineer
- Roy Williams, UNC basketball coach; partly raised in Spruce Pine
- Gerri Willis, Fox Business Network anchor and reporter at Fox News; native of Spruce Pine
