= Effects of Hurricane Helene in North Carolina =

Hurricane Helene
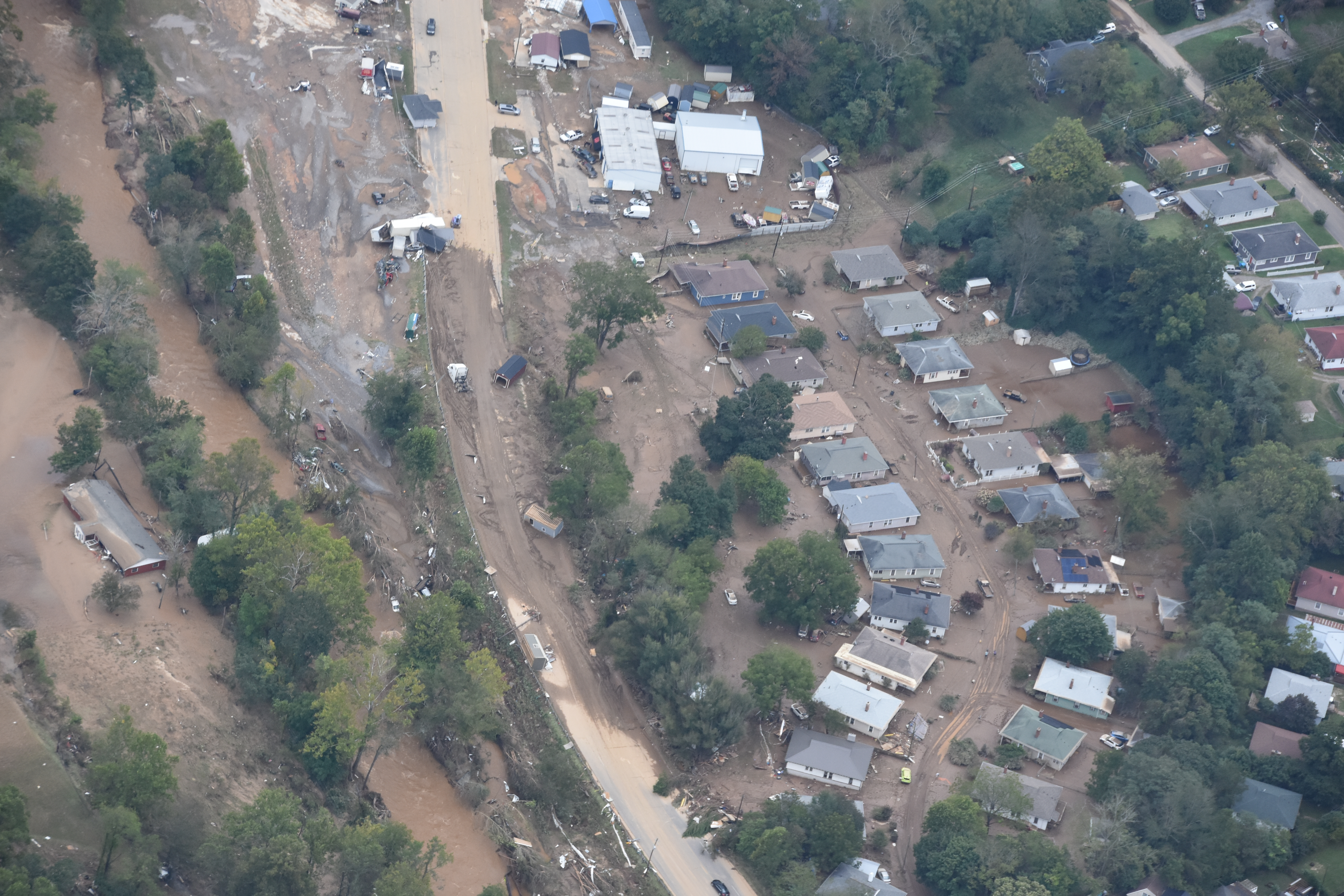
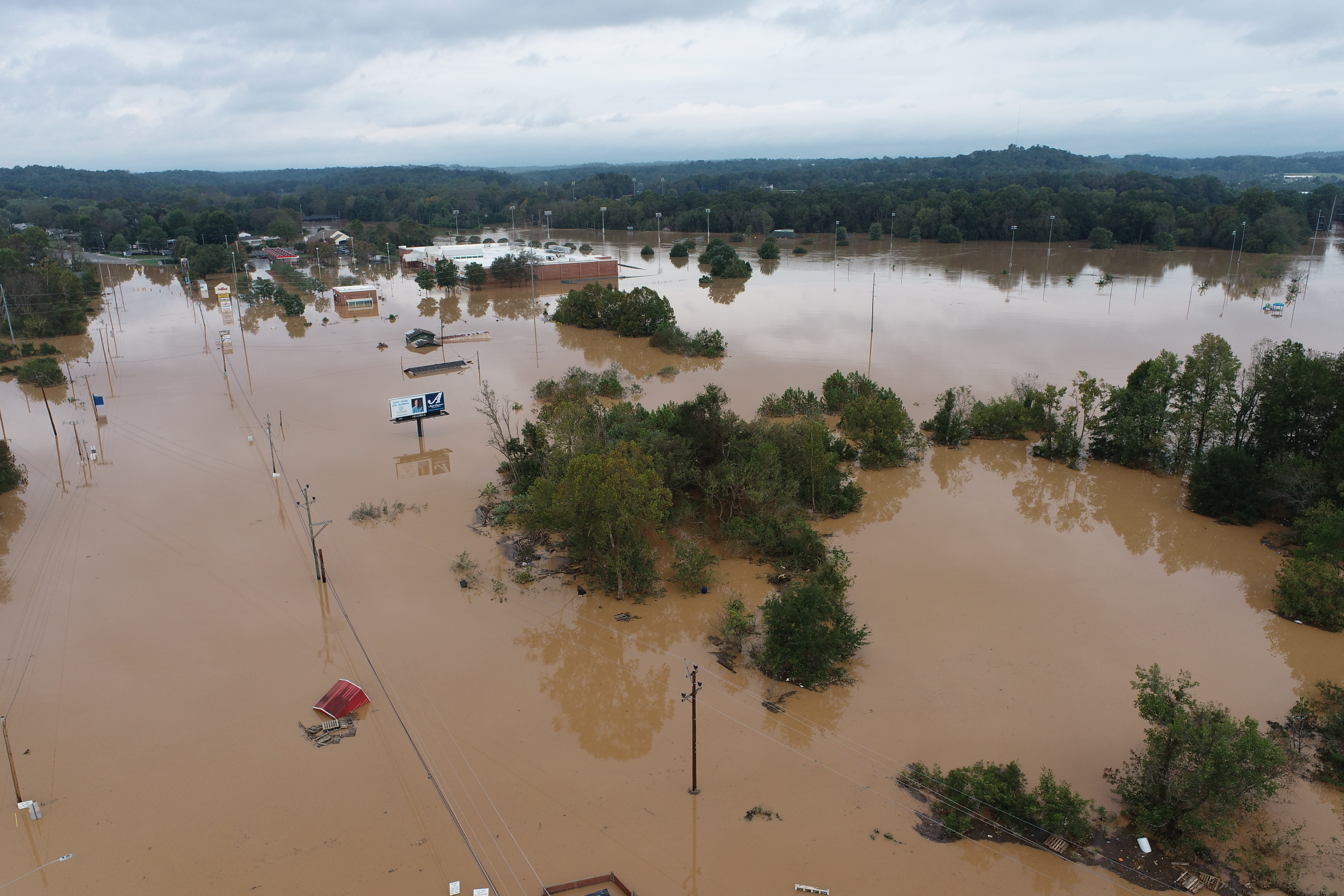
- Devastating flooding in Buncombe County after Hurricane Helene (top) and high floodwater in Burke County.

Meteorological history
- Duration: September 27, 2024

Tropical storm
- 1-minute sustained (SSHWS/NWS)
- Highest winds: 50 mph (85 km/h)
- Highest gusts: 75 mph (120 km/h)
- Lowest pressure: 972.2 mbar (hPa); 28.71 inHg

Overall effects
- Fatalities: 108 (Deadliest in modern North Carolina history)
- Missing: 4
- Damage: >$59.6 billion (2024 USD) (Costliest in North Carolina history)
- Areas affected: North Carolina, particularly the Mountain and Piedmont regions
- Part of the 2024 Atlantic hurricane season
- Effects Florida Georgia North Carolina Related Misinformation Other wikis Commons: Helene images

Wind and flooding from Hurricane Helene devastated North Carolina on September 27, 2024, primarily in its western Appalachian region, causing at least 108 reported deaths and major destruction of infrastructure and residential areas across several settlements. After making landfall in the Big Bend region of Florida on September 27, the hurricane traveled overland across Georgia as a Category 2 hurricane and into the Appalachian mountain range as a tropical storm, depositing record-breaking amounts of rainfall across several towns in western North Carolina, including Asheville, Swannanoa, Black Mountain, Montreat, Spruce Pine, Fairview, Chimney Rock, Lake Lure, and several others.

As a result of the historic rainfall, several rivers in the region overflowed and inundated multiple settlements, destroying houses and infrastructure and cutting off power, transportation, and communications to many towns for prolonged periods. In addition, several mudslides occurred across the region, significantly worsening the damage. Helene was the costliest natural disaster in North Carolina history, surpassing Hurricane Florence from 2018.

Hurricane Helene also had significant public health impacts, increasing risk of a variety of physical and mental illnesses for those exposed to conditions such as flooding. This increased risk was the most elevated among older adults. The community responded through volunteer efforts organized by local government agencies. Helene also forced a Baxtor International plant to close, leading to potential consequences for the supply of certain medical supplies.

== Background ==
Western North Carolina, and Appalachia as a whole, has historically been victim to significant flooding and damage caused by weakened hurricanes or their remnants, despite being far inland of coastal regions that typically bear the strongest and most publicized impacts. This is due to intense rainfall that can cause significant swelling of rivers and bodies of water, as well as torrents of water flowing down mountainous areas which cause destruction and damaging mudslides.

A 2025 study led by U.S. Geological Survey scientists suggests that landsliding during Hurricane Helene was concentrated on slopes facing southeast into the storm, the direction from which the heaviest rainfall approached the Blue Ridge escarpment. Multiple deaths and devastating destruction were a result of the steep terrain found on the mountains. This pattern is consistent with the storm's rainfall being enhanced as it moved up and over the mountains rather than landslides occurring randomly across the terrain. A field survey identified 2,217 individual landslides across the affected region by early 2025, up from an initial estimate of 1,155 recorded in the weeks after the storm. Separate research comparing the storm's landslides and 79 damaged bridges against pre-existing landslide-susceptibility maps found the maps had performed reasonably well at predicting where these landslides would occur.

For example, rainfall from Hurricane Andrew in 1992 spread across the southeastern United States along the Appalachian Mountains corridor; totals of over 5 in (130 mm) were reported near Ellicott Rock Wilderness.

== Meteorology ==
Meteorologist Ben Noll reported that about 1.5 times more moisture was transported to western North Carolina than in any prior recorded event in the region, with an estimated integrated vapor transport quantity of roughly 3,000 kilograms per meter per second that surpassed the prior record of 1,883 kg/m/s. The amount of moisture and rainfall deposited in the region was considered exceptional due to it being far inland of the East Coast and the Gulf Coast.

The North Carolina State Climate Office at North Carolina State University reported that its Mount Mitchell weather station recorded 24.41 in (620 mm) of rainfall. The office referred to the total as "off the charts", comparing it to 16.5 in (420 mm) of rainfall being a once-in-1,000-year flood for the area, drawing on statistics from 20th century climate. Asheville Regional Airport recorded 13.98 in (355 mm) of rainfall during the three day period from September 25 to 27. A North Carolina Forest Service weather station recorded receiving 31.33 in (796 mm) of rain from September 25 to 27, requiring further verification.

Readings from weather stations operated by the NWS Greenville-Spartanburg recorded 30.78 in (782 mm) of rainfall in Busick, North Carolina. Additionally, a minimum pressure of 972.2 millibars was recorded at Mount Mitchell State Park.

== Preparations ==
On September 25, western North Carolina was placed under tropical storm warnings, with Governor Roy Cooper declaring a state of emergency for the state. Both Gorges State Park and Mount Mitchell State Park were closed due to the storm, with a shutdown also occurring on the Blue Ridge Parkway. Significant closures also occurred on the North Carolina side of Great Smoky Mountains National Park, including on US 441. Amtrak modified or canceled several of its southeastern train routes between September 27 and October 1 because of the storm.

== Impact ==
North Carolina Impacts Associated with Hurricane Helene
County	Fatalities	Fatalities per 10,000	Injuries	Evacuations
Ashe County	1	0.369	Unknown	Unknown
Avery County	6	2.847	Unknown	Unknown
Buncombe County	43	1.559	Unknown	Unknown
Burke County	1	0.113	Unknown	Unknown
Catawba County	1	0.061	2	≥25
Cleveland County	2	0.197	Unknown	≥12
Gaston County	1	0.042	Unknown	≥9
Haywood County	5	0.794	Unknown	Unknown
Henderson County	12	0.839	Unknown	Unknown
Macon County	2	0.521	Unknown	Unknown
Madison County	4	1.814	Unknown	Unknown
McDowell County	2	0.223	Unknown	Unknown
Mecklenburg County	3	0.026	1	≥100
Mitchell County	3	1.334	Unknown	Unknown
Nash County	0	0.000	15	0
Polk County	1	0.499	Unknown	Unknown
Rowan County	1	0.066	Unknown	Unknown
Rutherford County	4	0.610	Unknown	Unknown
Wake County	1	0.008	Unknown	Unknown
Watauga County	2	0.365	Unknown	Unknown
Wilkes County	1	0.151	Unknown	Unknown
Yadkin County	1	0.265	Unknown	Unknown
Yancey County	11	5.810	Unknown	Unknown

Map of North Carolina counties showing fatalities per 10,000 due to Hurricane Helene

As of June 17, 2025, 107 people were killed in North Carolina, while 5 more are left unaccounted for in the state.

On September 27, 2024, the North Carolina Department of Transportation (NCDOT) issued a statement on their website that all roads in western North Carolina should be considered closed. A unit from the 1st Battalion of the 169th Aviation Regiment, part of the Connecticut Army National Guard, was deployed to help assist disaster relief efforts.

A mudslide and floodwaters from the Pigeon River swept a section of Interstate 40 at the North Carolina–Tennessee border away, forcing a closure. The Pigeon River rose higher in Canton than during Hurricane Frances in 2004 and Tropical Storm Fred in 2021. In Busick, rainfall totals reached 30.78 in (782 mm).

Areas in the Black Mountains region in western North Carolina were particularly devastated, with especially heavy damage to the communities of Montreat and Swannanoa. The village of Chimney Rock was also largely destroyed. More than 400 roads were closed in western North Carolina, and over 200 people had to be rescued from floods.

Eight tornadoes were spawned by Helene in the state. This included a brief but intense low-end EF3 tornado that impacted the north side of Rocky Mount, damaging 14 buildings and injuring 15 people, including four critically. Five of the other tornadoes were rated EF1, while the remaining two was rated EF0.

All K-12 schools in the region were closed, and several universities were impacted. Western Carolina University in Cullowhee was closed through October 4 and Appalachian State's campuses of Boone and Hickory were closed through October 5. App State's football game against Liberty was canceled due to flooding and was not rescheduled. The University of North Carolina at Asheville canceled all classes through October 28, and on October 29 announced that the remainder of the semester would be held completely online. Following the severe utility outages and damage caused by Hurricane Helene in late September 2024, in Swannanoa, Warren Wilson College instructed residential students to evacuate campus as soon as local road conditions allowed. A small cohort of students remained on-site to assist campus staff with early restoration, agricultural preservation, and debris clearance. Classes resumed remotely on October 21, 2024, and transitioned back to fully in-person instruction on October 28, 2024, once water and power infrastructure were sufficiently stabilized. To compensate for the lost instructional time, the college extended the fall semester into December before commencing winter break.

=== Avery County ===
Avery County experienced its worst flooding event in recorded history, with thousands of dwellings damaged by flooding, destroying many of them. Landslides and floodwaters also carried away bridges and roads and led to extensive road closures, isolating many communities. A number of water rescues also occurred. In Elk Park, a family's home was swept away by rapid floodwaters, which was photographed before it struck the riverbank and tore apart, leaving one person missing. Winds downed many trees and powerlines, leaving nearly 100% of Avery County without electricity.

=== Buncombe County ===
The National Oceanic and Atmospheric Administration's finalized reports for Hurricane Helene's aftermath in Buncombe County

In Buncombe County, waterways associated with the French Broad River basin exceeded previous highest-ever heights by several feet, while many weather observation sites broke three-day rainfall total records. Floodwaters covered large swaths of I-40 and US 74, resulted in numerous road closures, and washed away some bridges and roads. This, as well as landslides, left communities isolated. At least hundreds of businesses and homes experienced some degree of water damage. High winds felled many trees and power lines. Nearly all of the county was left without electricity and water. As of April 2, 2025, 43 people were killed in Buncombe County alone, according to the North Carolina Department of Health and Human Services (NCDHHS).

==== Asheville ====
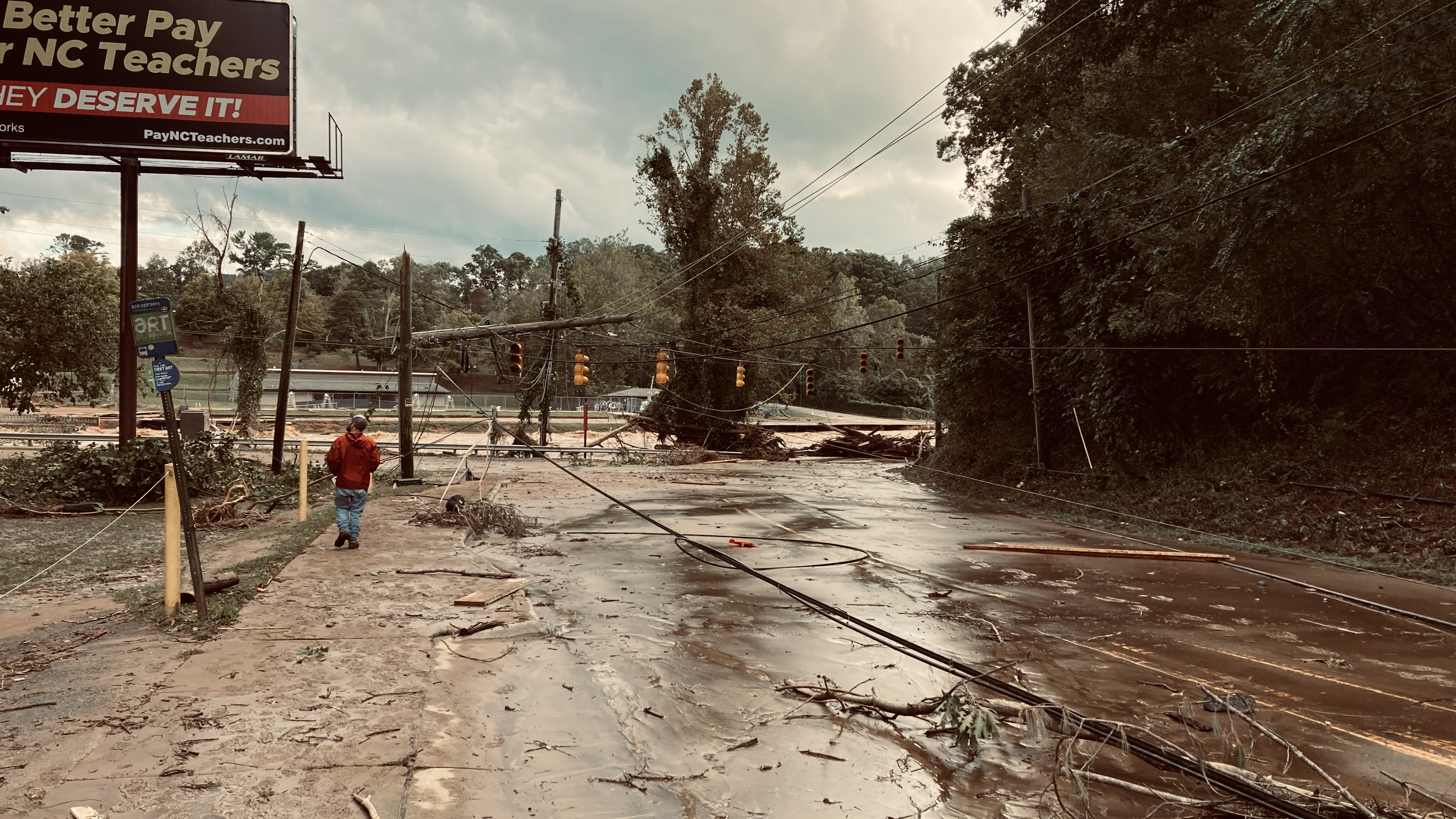
Devastation at the intersection of Swannanoa River Road (NC-81) and Azalea Road in Asheville on September 27, 2024.

A curfew was issued for Asheville due to the damage that occurred inside the city. The city broke its record for two-day rainfall, recording 9.87 in (251 mm) of rain. Almost the entirety of Biltmore Village and the River Arts District were flooded, and the city was largely isolated due to loss of power and cell service. Landslides around Asheville forced sections of I-26 and I-40 to close, and triggered a flash flood emergency for the location. Access to Asheville was cut off from September 27–28 via I-26 to South Carolina.

The National Center for Environmental Information was forced to shut down due to power outages and flooding caused by the storm.

==== Fairview ====
Fairview in Buncombe County suffered severe damage from flooding, with the Garren Creek area deemed "completely devastated". One resident was forced to grab onto a pole to survive rapid flood waters, while two women were carried by floodwaters in their house until it crashed in a forest. Thirteen total deaths occurred due to landslides in Garren Creek, including eleven members of the same family who had lived in a community known as Craigtown. This was the largest cluster of deaths in Buncombe County.

==== Swannanoa ====
Floodwaters in Swannanoa caused the Davidson Road Bridge to collapse. An engineering assessment found that bridge failures across the region, including collapses at highway crossings, resulted from a combination of landslide-associated debris. This has led researchers to recommend re-evaluating bridge-approach design standards for mountainous terrain. Residents of the town reported to local media outlets that there were multiple missing persons who were living in rural areas. Residents also reported that no search and rescue operations had reached their location as of September 29, leaving several residents who had not prepared for the degree of flooding without food or drinkable water. At least one missing person was living near the Bee Tree Christian Church, which had been destroyed by flooding and fallen trees.

Damage to the town included cars that had been lifted to the tops of trees by the elevated floodwaters, thick mud burying several businesses and roads, and several homes along the river that were destroyed and deposited far downstream. A resident reported that it took less than an hour for water in one residential area to rise by over 4 feet.

=== Catawba County ===
In Catawba County, Helene produced wind gusts up to 52 mph (84 km/h) at the Hickory Regional Airport. Consequently, power outages occurred and numerous trees were toppled. Heavy rains caused one indirect death and two injuries due to a car accident. Although minor flooding was reported along streams, the release of water via the Oxford Dam resulted in major flooding on the Catawba River and Lookout Shoals Lake. Consequently, the latter crested at its height level since 1940 – 9.45 ft (2.88 m). Downstream flooding prompted evacuations and damaged several homes.

=== Haywood County ===
in Haywood County, the Pigeon River crested higher than in previous floods in 2004 and 2021. Canton mayor Zeb Smathers described the damage as "apocalyptic". The Pisgah High School football field which had been flooded twice already in three years would have to be renovated once again, and relocation was being considered. The sale of the Pactiv Evergreen plant was delayed and the sewage treatment plant was having problems. Flooding in Bethel and Clyde was described as the worst ever. In Waynesville, the Frog Level and Hazelwood sections experienced the worst flooding ever from Richland Creek. Frog Level had more structural damage. Maggie Valley had some businesses flooded by Jonathan Creek.

=== Madison County ===
Marshall, the county seat of Madison County, suffered catastrophic flooding when the French Broad River crested at historic levels on September 27. The town of Hot Springs also experienced catastrophic flooding from Spring Creek and the French Broad River. Most business in both downtown districts were severely damaged. Flooding on the Ivy River swept away several homes and caused fatalities. Small communities in Madison County, such as the community of Rollins, suffered loss of homes and life.

=== McDowell County ===
In Marion, the county seat of McDowell County, a couple's home was destroyed by a mudslide, requiring a rescue by a pulley system, leaving one missing. A Baxter International manufacturing plant was heavily impacted by floodwaters, forcing its temporary closure and halting of the production of medications, dialysis solutions, and IV fluids for nationwide distribution. The Town of Old Fort was particularly hit hard when the convergence of Mill Creek, and the Catawba River washed the center of the town away, causing significant damage to bridges, roads, and parts of I-40 along the Catawba River. A primary road way, Catawba Ave, experienced a surge in flood waters due to multiple bridges across Mill River. One resident's rough estimation indicates nearly 820 have become homeless due to Hurricane Helene's devastating flood waters. The wind and water had tossed mobile homes hundreds of yards and washed away cars into the Catawba River, leaving the town's residents to wait for the restoration of cell service and the arrival of help from across North Carolina. The Historic Mauney House, office space and meeting space for the Mountain Gateway Museum, was damaged significantly due to fallen trees in the rushing floodwaters. Old Fort Elementary (built in 2020) experienced extensive flooding due to creek convergences, as such, closed with students relocating to nearby schools. A section of I-40 at Old Fort mountain experienced a massive slide, in combination with other road closures, cut off access to the Town of Old Fort from other cities for several days.

=== Mitchell County ===
Spruce Pine, the largest town in Mitchell County, was heavily inundated with 24.12 inches of rainfall and the swelling of the North Toe River, significantly damaging the downtown area and destroying several shops, roads, and connections to water and electricity. Due to Spruce Pine being one of the few places in the world with "ultra-high quality" quartz mines essential for semiconductor production, damage from Helene was predicted to hamper global microchip supplies and technological supply chains if the town's quartz mines were damaged and shut down for long periods.

=== Rutherford County ===
==== Chimney Rock ====
Chimney Rock was one of the most severely damaged of all the towns by Hurricane Helene. National Weather Service data indicated that over 19 inches of rain fell in areas upstream and to the west of Chimney Rock, leading to devastating floodwaters that destroyed half of the village according to rescue crew, including half of the businesses on the south side of the village near the Broad River. Most of Main Street and most of the businesses located on it were destroyed by the rapid floodwaters, with Pamlico County Emergency Manager Chris Murray remarking, "I’ve never seen concentrated damage like we’ve seen here... There’s nothing left."

Pamlico County rescue personnel reported that they had rescued four people, and evacuated 106 more people in addition to two cats and two dogs. Many of those isolated due to the lack of power and available communication were airlifted by Rutherford County Emergency Management to RS Central High School.

==== Lake Lure ====
The National Weather Service stated that 19 inches of rain had fallen to the west of Lake Lure, leading to significant rising of its water levels by the morning of September 26 that caused extensive flooding. Marina docks and boats on the lake were carried down onto the remains of destroyed structures, many of which had been carried down from Chimney Rock. One woman was rescued with her dog after being stranded inside a collapsed house along a riverbank.

Rutherford County officials issued a mandatory evacuation order to residents living downstream of Lake Lure for them to find higher ground, as the Lake Lure Dam's 124-foot-high barrier was entirely overtopped by water, had water pouring from around its sides, and was thus expected to suffer from imminent failure. Evacuation sirens sounded in settlements downstream of the dam and about 1,600 Lake Lure residents were given evacuation orders. Lake Lure Dam was later evaluated to have no imminent failure expected, although erosion on both sides of the dam and the compromising of the structural supports were reported.

=== Watauga County ===
Before the event, two tornado warnings were issued to much of Watauga County, including Boone, Blowing Rock, Beech Mountain, and Foscoe.

On September 27, several warnings were issued across the county, including extreme rainfall and flash flood emergencies. Flooding in the area was worsened by flash flooding from days prior to Helene and tornado damage. Two deaths were reported by the North Carolina Department of Health and Human Services.

Appalachian State University sustained storm damage and flooding damage, causing classes and athletic events to be canceled through October 15. While flood waters receded somewhat quickly from populated areas, 140 housing units were condemned in the Town as of October 5, 2024.

=== Yancey County ===
The highest observed rainfall totals from Helene were in Busick (30.78 inches) and Celo (26.65 inches), both in Yancey County. About 1,400 homes were destroyed and 2,300 others sustained major damage from the storm, and more than 200 landslides caused damage to several roads. Ten deaths were reported as direct fatalities from Helene, eight from flooding, one in a landslide, and one in a vehicle.

== Aftermath ==
=== Rescue and recovery ===
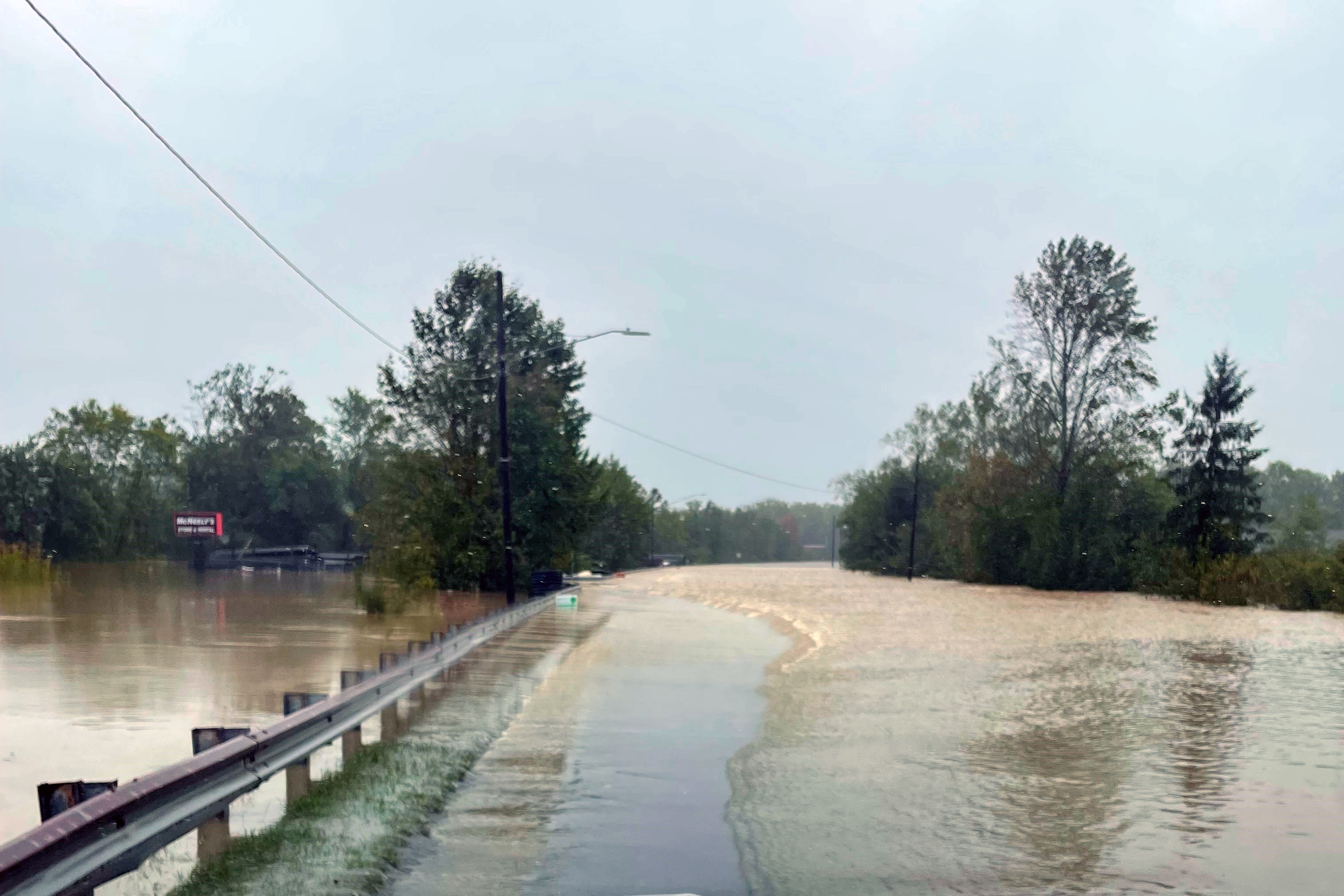
Flooding on U.S. Route 64, facing west, in Henderson County on September 27, 2024.

Of the 241 people reported victims of Hurricane Helene in the United States, 119 people were in North Carolina, surpassing the state record of 80 deaths recorded in a 1916 flood. The reported count of missing people was under 600 people by September 29, according to a Register of Deeds update. As of April 2025, the death toll reported by the North Carolina Department of Health and Human Services had been reduced to 107.

A group of 34 students and chaperones from Girard College were located by rescuers after their week long partnership with the North Carolina Outward Bound School was cut short by the storm.

North Carolina Sheriff's Association reported that two officers were killed by flood waters during rescue operations. Pack mules were utilized to access areas inaccessible by other means in North Carolina. Operation AirDrop and the Carolina Emergency Response Team helped deploy volunteer private helicopter pilots to assist in rescue efforts.

Henderson County issued a public statement urging tourists outside of the region to not come to visit the area, while instructing them to bring essential toiletries, water, and non-perishable food if they still decided to visit in order to aid those in need.

Mayor of Canton Zeb Smathers referred to recovery efforts as being for a "21st century storm with 20th century technology” due to telecommunication and power outages forcing first responders to use pack mules and handwritten notes for communication and delivery. Black Mountain residents resorted to using makeshift message boards to list missing residents and humanitarian aid details.

One estimate of the number of damaged homes statewide was 73,700, with 9,234 of those in Buncombe County. The state Office of Management and Budget said "upward of 121,000 homes" and estimated that as of January 2025 12,000 were still displaced.

==== Animals ====
Animals were ferried from North Carolina shelters to other shelters in Louisiana, Virginia, Washington D.C, Mississippi and other locations as many of the shelters in the area were damaged or completely destroyed. Specific search and rescue teams were deployed to search for missing animals such as horses, dogs, cats, and guinea pigs. Workers and rescuers found that the animals at the Western North Carolina Nature Center were unharmed and the majority of the damage was to surrounding trees and fencing.

Flooding in western North Carolina has caused many yellow jackets, bees, and other insects in underground nests to be disrupted causing many of them to swarm in and around areas where residents are attempting to recover. The resulting insect stings has caused a reported surge in Benadryl and epinephrine injectors through hospitals, emergency medical officers and doctors.

45,000 chickens died in one North Carolina facility alone as a result of Helene. Damage to poultry facilities in North Carolina and Georgia have raised concerns about manure runoff into water supplies. North Carolina is a major supplier of poultry to the United States, and the storm is expected to have an impact on the nation's overall poultry supply.

=== Effect on 2024 elections ===
Prior to the storm, election officials had already mailed out more than 200,000 absentee ballots, including about 39,728 the day the storm hit to the 25 western counties that were part of the federal major disaster declaration for the storm. Only about 1,499 of those ballots had been returned before the storm hit.

The North Carolina State Board of Elections reported that at least ten election offices were closed as a result of flooding, causing difficulties in voter registration by the October 11 deadline and possible prevention of early in-person voting in affected regions, beginning October 17. The state board expressed that its officials were attempting to reopen impacted election offices in order to process new voter registrations and absentee ballot requests before their deadlines pass.

=== Healthcare ===
Following Hurricane Helene, concern regarding public health risks rose. As a result, the NC Department of Health and Human Services released a list of communicable and non-communicable disease that people exposed to the conditions following the storm were susceptible to for the sake of health workers responding to this event. Risk of gastroenteritis increased with exposure to pathogens in flood water, contaminated food, and lack of refrigeration. Viral respiratory illness became a concern due to close contact between survivors sheltering in cramped areas. Injuries and open wounds were exposed to infections such as cellulitis and tetanus, and flood waters provided breeding grounds for mosquitos potentially carrying diseases. Noncommunicable health concerns included increased exposure to mold and indoor-air pollutants, risk of domestic and sexual violence incidences due to higher stress levels, as well as opioid-related health crises.

According to a study conducted using records from emergency departments in rural Appalachia, hospital visits related to mental health disorders and substance abuse also increased in the aftermath of Helene. Mood disorders increased during the "early recovery period", schizophrenia and opioid-related visits increased during the later "short-term recovery period", and anxiety related visits increased throughout overall recovery. The results of a study published by the Journal of Appalachian Health indicated that higher rates of mental health issues such as PTSD symptoms may be observed in those that did not evacuate in comparison to those that did.

In a study conducted five months after flooding in Southern Appalachia, results indicated that higher rates of physical and mental health symptoms were observed among adults ages 55 to 75+, especially those with disabilities or illnesses. 24.4% of the participants in this study showed moderate to severe PTSD symptoms, and commonly reported physical symptoms for this age group were headaches, nose and eye irritation, and nausea.

Physician and Obama administration worker Dr. Kavita Patel described healthcare in the affected regions as being in "Third World conditions" due to supply shortages and power outages hindering care, reporting that several doctors in the region resorted to using Amazon Wishlist products such as water-sanitizing tablets to make water drinkable. 1,200 North Carolina Department of Adult Correction inmates were relocated due to power and water shortages.

In addition, a Baxter International manufacturing plant in Marion was closed as a result of the storm's impact, which analysts predicted could lead to significant disruptions to national medical supply chains, causing shortages of medications, dialysis solutions, and IV fluids nationwide.

Despite infrastructure weaknesses following Helene, the community in Western North Carolina came together to support physical and mental health. "Flush Brigades" volunteered to help mitigate unsanitary conditions that can lead to poor physical health by helping to pour clean water into toilets throughout the community, allowing potentially harmful waste to be properly disposed of. The Buncombe County Emergency Operations Center and Buncombe County Public Health worked together to set up "Community Care Stations" during the early recovery period to provide community members with survival necessities and access to health services. These health services also included offering tetanus vaccines, addressing the concerns about bacterial infection of wounds following the storm.

In Buncombe County, a survey to assess long-term public health needs after Helene was scheduled to begin in April 2025, but was cancelled due to layoffs at U.S. federal health agencies.

=== Power and utility outages ===
On October 1, Governor of North Carolina Roy Cooper reported that 460,000 North Carolinians suffered from power outages. Of these, over 100,000 people across Buncombe County suffered from power outages lasting into October 1. These, in addition to destroyed, damaged, and blocked bridges, destruction of utilities such as power and water, and the “complete infrastructural failure” across several settlements, significantly complicated rescue efforts and aid delivery. North Carolina Attorney General Josh Stein received over seventy complaints about the price gouging of groceries and hotel rooms, prompting him to compel businesses to provide support to those in need. Only one school out of 53 in Buncombe county had running water, forcing their closures.

Duke Energy reported that the degree of destruction to power infrastructure would require "significant replacement". On October 2, Duke Energy reported that 370 substations in western North Carolina were damaged or destroyed by the impacts of Helene, with several having been underwater.

On October 2, Verizon reported that while it had recovered cell coverage to 60% of all regions affected by Helene, that western North Carolina's thick forests, mountainous terrain, destroyed or blocked roads, and ongoing flooding made fixing cell towers in the region difficult, causing them to resort to use drones to provide temporary coverage. T-Mobile also noted difficulties in restoring coverage in North Carolina due to access challenges, resorting to distributing Wi-Fi connectivity stations and mobile generators to the region. Starlink announced that its satellite internet service would be "free" for all regions impacted by Helene for 30 days; Starlink equipment was required use the service, which was sold for approximately $349 plus shipping, and could not be delivered to many areas due to the road damage.

Following the storm, the webcam and weather station atop Mount Mitchell ceased transmitting data since the hurricane.

=== Road damage ===
The North Carolina Department of Transportation reported that 400 roads in western North Carolina, including hundreds of state and national routes, were closed or deemed impassable due to landslides, flooding, and destroyed bridges caused by Helene. Westbound I-40 and I-26 were initially closed, and were later reopened only for evacuations. Several roads were in areas that were either difficult to reach due to Appalachia's mountainous terrain or from closed roads preventing other roads from being accessed, making it difficult to assess every road that was damaged and resulted in an estimate of several months time for some roads to be fixed. The department declared that all roads in western North Carolina should be considered closed to non-residents who were not providing aid. Florida's Department of Transportation sent its own personnel and portable bridges to aid in road assessment and reconstruction.

Parts of the eastbound I-40 section in the Pigeon River Gorge collapsed into the Pigeon River due to its swelling and rapid flow, and this section was considered by the department to be the most challenging section of road to fix. The road reopened March 1 with one lane in each direction and a 35 MPH speed limit. The Blue Ridge Parkway was indefinitely closed due to damage between mileposts 217 to 469 – the entirety of the North Carolina segment. As of February 12, 2025, 310 miles of the parkway had reopened. The estimated repair cost was between $1 and $2 billion, and some work was expected to take two to three years.

The estimated cost to repair all damaged roads in Western North Carolina was $5 billion, $500 million of that for U.S. Route 19W and $1 billion for I-40.

=== Economy and tourism ===
As of October 3, much of the Great Smoky Mountains National Park was open.

On October 3, Gov. Roy Cooper told the Asheville Citizen-Times that only those providing help should travel to Western North Carolina. This was a problem for an area dependent on tourists coming to see fall leaves, but the priority, Cooper said, was "meeting people's immediate needs, saving lives". Visit North Carolina warned people not to come because of power and water outages, shortages of food and gas, and closed roads. Messages such as "It's too dangerous to travel to Haywood County" were necessary in the early days after the storm, but much of Waynesville and Maggie Valley were ready for tourists two weeks later and tried to change the message. Opponents of the change pointed out that many areas were not back to normal. Businesses, however, needed tourists to spend during the fall season before winter. Another area dependent on tourism was Blowing Rock, which had few effects, but nearly three weeks after the storm, few people visited during what was normally a busy fall leaf season. Despite problems with the Blue Ridge Parkway and other attractions, Blowing Rock was ready for tourists and inviting them to come. While the parkway drew 2 million visitors in October 2023, none of it was open until twenty miles opened in the northern part of the state on October 23. All of the southernmost 57 miles except for a short section near Devil's Courthouse opened October 30. About six more miles near Asheville opened November 1.

In the Asheville area, with tourism representing 20 percent of the economy and contributing $3 billion in 2023, North Carolina Arboretum reopened October 28 and Biltmore Estate started its Christmas season November 2. Buncombe County Tourism Development Authority and Explore Asheville resumed marketing, though VisitNC's Travel Advisory Map put the area under a yellow alert on October 19, meaning visitors should make sure they can get to where they want to go. One forecast cited by the authority estimated lodging taxes would be down 40 percent or more during the next three months. And the tourism industry in Asheville had already lost its busiest month. The authority predicted that for the last quarter of 2024, tourism would be down 70 percent, with the predicted revenue loss $584 million. Lodging numbers for the county were down 74 percent in October compared to the previous year, and 57 percent in November.

Employment rates in counties effected by Helene dropped significantly in the storm's aftermath. Immediately after Helene, Buncombe County jumped from 2.5 percent, the state's lowest, to 10.4 percent. Mitchell County had the state's highest rate in November at 9.1 percent, and in December at 7.3 percent. Buncombe and Madison Counties followed with 6 percent.

=== Long-term impacts ===
The Federal Emergency Management Agency (FEMA) reported that only 0.8 percent of households in disaster-declared counties in North Carolina held FEMA flood insurance policies. Environmental and insurance experts stated that the lack of flooding insurance would significantly slow the rebuilding and repairing of flood-damaged properties, as well as the recovery of entire communities. Lack of flooding insurance can also force many of the impacted to deplete their savings or abandon their homes entirely. Experts stated that low-income communities would suffer the worst due to lacking substantial savings and potentially not qualifying for credit from banks or from Small Business Administration (SBA) disaster loans. FEMA plans to update flood maps in 2026 after having been restricted by Congress to only look at past events for determining which properties are required to get flood insurance. Many communities and property owners appeal and contest flood risk findings by FEMA not wanting to make required protections or pay for insurance, leading to maps that underestimate risk. In some places in Western North Carolina impacted by Helene, maps by First Street found roughly 10x the number of properties would have been in a 100-year flood zone category, if FEMA had been allowed to use more comprehensive and modern forecasting. Better maps could have resulted in more insurance coverage and flood prevention measures.

These predictions were partly based on a 2023 study examining the aftermath of Hurricane Florence in 2018, which found that uninsured losses, when coupled with declining property values, caused significant increases in the risk of mortgage default and abandonment of housing. Similar patterns were observed following Hurricane Harvey in 2017.

== Response ==
Governor of North Carolina Roy Cooper stated on October 1 that “The devastation brought by Hurricane Helene is beyond belief” and that, “Communities were wiped off the map.” He further reported that over 57,000 people applied for FEMA assistance, and over $1 million had been distributed to residents directly so far. The governor's report stated that as of that morning, more than 700 North Carolina National Guard soldiers and airmen had been activated, with 275 vehicles and 15 aircraft, to deliver supplies and conduct search and rescue operations. More than 400 people had been rescued by NC National Guard soldiers, and search and rescue teams from other states as well as federal teams had facilitated additional rescues and evacuations.

After several days, Gov. Cooper commended the first responders and healthcare workers who traveled to devastated areas to assist those in need, especially since many were departing from their own homes which had been severely impacted by the storm, but he never addressed the failures in deploying personnel. Director of Emergency Management for North Carolina William Ray instructed people to not use drones in the area due to the potential hazards it could bring to rescue and response operations.

The lieutenant governor of North Carolina Mark Robinson, tweeted on October 1 false claims that United States President Joe Biden had stated that the federal government had "no more supplies" for the state. When asked for proof of the statement, Robinson's office sent over a video clip of Biden on September 29, being asked if there was anymore resources from the federal government for the state. Biden responded, "no...we have pre-planned a significant amount of [resources], even though they hadn’t asked for it yet."

FEMA Administrator Deanne Criswell was directed by Biden to stay in North Carolina until the region was stabilized, with Biden intending to visit Raleigh. Over 1,200 personnel entered North Carolina, along with ten search and rescue teams. Biden also directed Defense Secretary Lloyd Austin to send 1,000 active-duty military personnel to the region.

Governor of Florida Ron Desantis sent resources and personnel from Florida to North Carolina to assist with rescue operations.

During the October 1 Vice Presidential debate, Republican J.D. Vance called the hurricane's impact “an unbelievable, unspeakable human tragedy” and stated that both he and Democrat Tim Walz "want as robust and aggressive as a federal response as we can get to save as many lives as possible. And then, of course, afterwards, to help the people in those communities rebuild”. Walz concurred and called the hurricane a "horrific tragedy".

In the weeks following the disaster, the Tryon International Equestrian Center and Resort (Tryon International), in Mill Spring (Polk County), served as a command center and community assembly point - providing food, water, vital supplies, shelter and support to devastated communities in Polk, Rutherford, Henderson and other nearby counties.

On October 25, 2024, Tryon International hosted PHP: People Helping People, a benefit concert headlined by internationally known musician, composer, actor and Tryon, NC native Dr. Samuel Waymon, with The Magic Man Band. Emceed by actress, comedienne and talk radio host Pam Stone, the show featured performances by Champagne Charlie, The Zion Grove AME Zion Church Music Department, Awake in the Dream, Shane Pruitt, The Flatrock Playhouse and the Kenya Cultural Quintet. On February 21, 2025, Waymon's performance of Randy Newman's "Baltimore" (In Four Movements) - recorded live during the benefit show at Tryon International - was released worldwide via the popular music streaming platforms.

Eric Church and Luke Combs put together the "Concert for Carolina" on October 26, 2024, at Bank of America Stadium in Charlotte, which raised over $24 million for hurricane relief.

Throughout the fall of 2024, businesses organized mutual aid efforts following the hurricane, with some companies donating portions of profits to relief and recovery programs. U.S. Small Business Administration (SBA) Administrator and Trump Administration Cabinet Official Kelly Loeffler visited the region on June 20, 2025, to celebrate the reopening of just one of the many businesses reopenings following the hurricane. During the visit she cited that the SBA had given out over $380 million in loans to the Western North Carolina region.

On January 1, 2025, American professional wrestling promotion All Elite Wrestling (AEW) hosted a special episode of their flagship show, Dynamite: Fight for the Fallen, at Harrah's Cherokee Center in Asheville. Proceeds from the event were donated to local charities and hurricane relief efforts.

How both Cooper and Wheatley responded to Helene became a key part of the campaign for the 2026 senate race in the state.

== See also ==
- Effects of Hurricane Dorian in the Carolinas
- Effects of Hurricane Floyd in North Carolina
- List of North Carolina hurricanes (2000–present)
- Tropical cyclones in 2024
