= Mount Craig (North Carolina) =

Mountain in North Carolina, United States

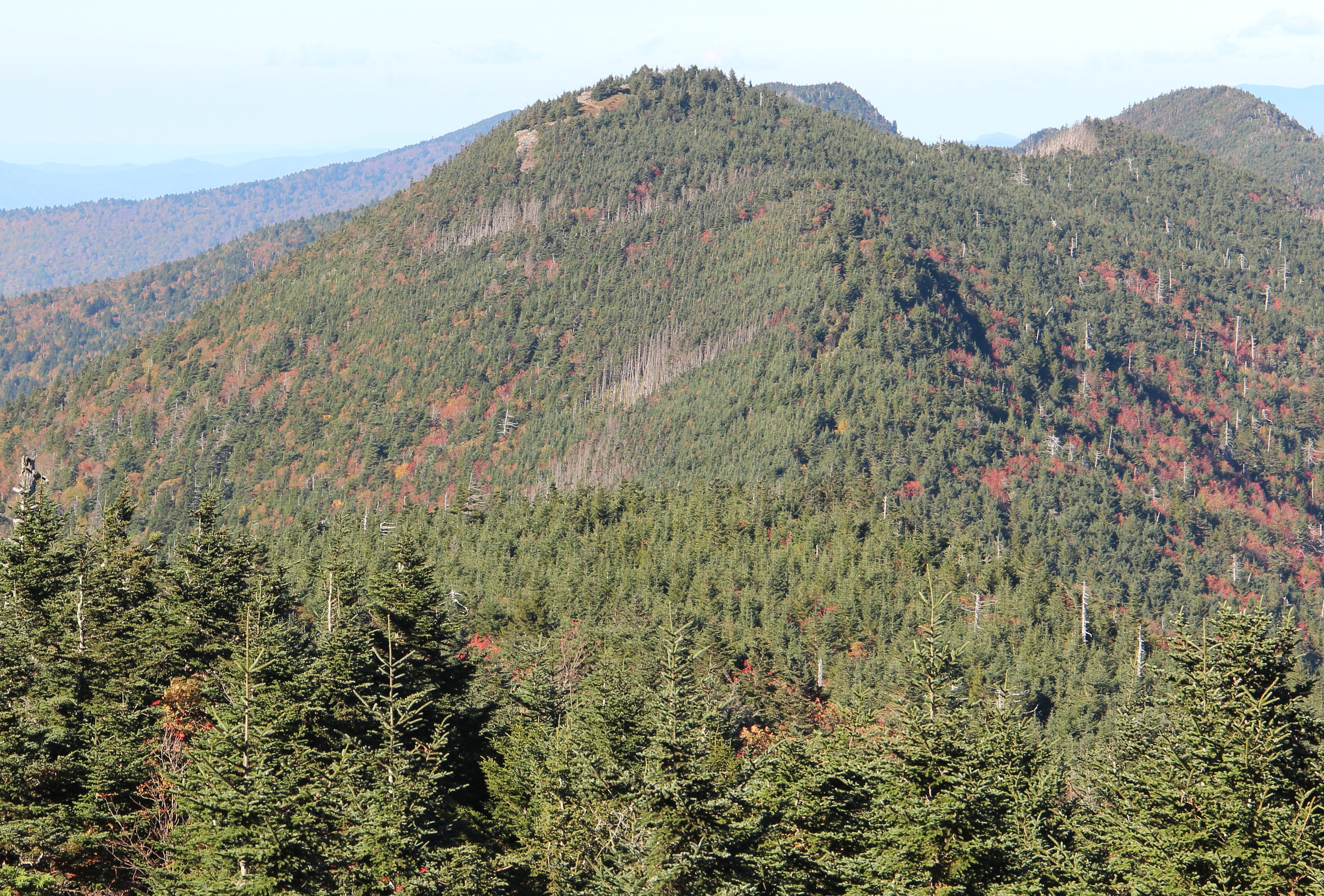
- Mount Craig viewed from the summit of Mount Mitchell in 2016

Highest point
- Elevation: 6,647 ft (2,026 m)
- Prominence: 287 ft (87 m)
- Coordinates: 35.7774°N 82.2618°W

Geography
- Location: Yancey County, North Carolina, U.S.
- Parent range: Appalachian Mountains
- Topo map: USGS Mount Mitchell

Climbing
- Easiest route: Hike

Mount Craig, 6,647 feet (2,026 m), is the second highest peak of the Appalachian Mountains and second only to 6,684 feet (2,037 m) Mount Mitchell in eastern mainland North America. It is located in the Black Mountains in Yancey County, North Carolina. The mountain lies about a mile (2 km) north of Mount Mitchell and is within Mount Mitchell State Park and the Pisgah National Forest.

Mount Craig was named in honor of Locke Craig, the governor of North Carolina from 1913 to 1917, who was partially responsible for establishing Mount Mitchell State Park in 1915 as the state's first in order to protect the area from excessive logging.

== Trails ==
The mountain can easily be reached via an approximately 45-minute hike on the Deep Gap Trail from the picnic area below the summit of Mount Mitchell off N.C. Highway 128. The view atop Mount Craig embraces much of the southern portion of the Black Mountain Range. A North Carolina Geodetic Survey triangulation marker is located on the summit.

The Deep Gap Trail proceeds beyond Mount Craig to other North Carolina high peaks including Big Tom, Cattail Peak, Balsam Cone, Potato Knob and through Deep Gap to Winter Star Mountain, Gibbs Mountain and Celo Knob.

== Elevation designation ==
Formerly the third highest point in mainland eastern North America, Mount Craig is currently designated by the USGS as the second. However, there is only a 4-foot (1.2 m) difference in elevation between it and 6,643-foot (2,025 m) Kuwohi, the highest point in the Great Smoky Mountains. Kuwohi's elevation is based on a conventional 1920 optical survey.

Mount Craig's elevation was revised upwards in 1993 based upon satellite GPS to an accuracy of 4 inches (10 centimeters). Until Kuwohi can be remeasured by GPS, Mount Craig retains its designation as second highest.

== See also ==
- Mount Mitchell State Park
- Mountain peaks of North America
- Mountain peaks of the United States
- List of mountains in North Carolina
