= Busick =

Busick is both a surname and a given name. Notable people with the name include:

- Amanda Busick (born 1986), American sports reporter
- Guy Busick, American film and television screenwriter
- Nick Busick (born 1954), American wrestler
- Steve Busick (born 1958), American football player
- Busick Harwood (1745?–1814), English physician

== See also ==
- Busick, North Carolina
