= Mount Mitchell Challenge =

The Mount Mitchell Challenge is a 40-mile Ultramarathon run in February of each year from the town of Black Mountain, NC to the top of Mt Mitchell, the highest point in the Eastern US, and back down again.

It was stated in 1998 by locals businesses Black Dome Mountain Sports and Black Mountain Savings.

== See also ==
- Mount Mitchell
- Mount Mitchell State Park
