= River Arts District =

Region of Asheville, North Carolina

Coordinates: 35.587°N 82.565°W

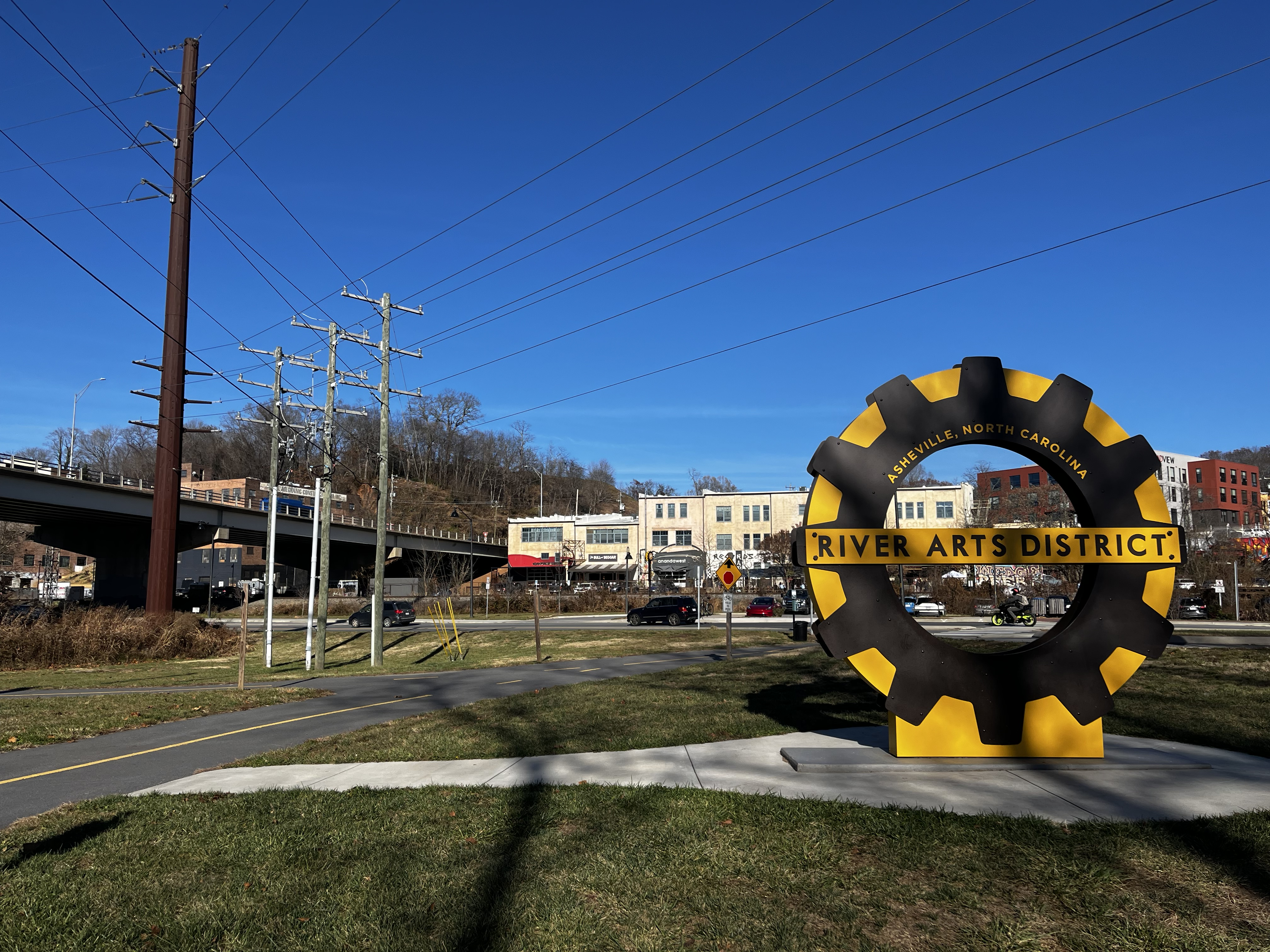
Jean Webb Park in the River Arts District

The River Arts District in Asheville, North Carolina, is an area of former industrial buildings located near the French Broad River, along Riverside Drive east of Interstate 240. Numerous artists have moved into the area and produce and display their works. It is the result of RiverLink's design to redevelop the urban riverfront corridor, built and expanded from the 1989 Asheville Riverfront Plan, which won the American Planning Association Award and represents the consolidation of over 20 years of community planning. The River Arts District was voted the No. 1 Best Arts District in the U.S. by USA TODAY in February 2026, recognizing its resilience, vibrant creative community, and over 500 working artists.

== Description ==
The River Arts District runs north along the east side of the French Broad River from the Lyman Street Curve to Jeff Bowen Bridge and along Depot Street and Roberts Street from Clingman Avenue.

== History ==
=== Development along the French Broad River ===
Starting in the early-to-mid-19th century, the riverfront's even ground and untainted openspace made it a popular trade route. Soon farmers, homesteads, inns and local small stores were drawn to take advantage of the economic opportunity. In the late 19th century, the Western North Carolina Railroad expanded along the French Broad River and the banks' land value increased. The river's natural attributes drew crowds and Asheville grew to be a small and economically adorned city.

After the first railroads reached Asheville in October 1880, industries began to locate along the French Broad River. The two-story Cotton Mill building, where denim and flannel were made, is one of the oldest buildings in the district. Built in 1887, it was the fifth large factory in the area. Moses and Caesar Cone took over C.E. Graham Manufacturing in 1893 and changed its name to Asheville Cotton Mills, which made coarse plaid cloth. Cone Mills closed the factory complex in 1953, and it remained empty for the next 40 years. Clyde Savings Bank sold the complex to the Preservation Society of Asheville and Buncombe County in 1993. Most of the 122,000-square-foot building burned April 2, 1995, in a fire determined to be arson. The society called the building "the key structure in the area's redevelopment." The fire destroyed a water tower intended to be a symbol of the new district. Eileen and Marty Black bought the remaining building in 2002, renovated it, and moved into Cotton Mill Studios with other artists.

Another major building built by Nabisco on Depot Street in 1907 became Lift Studios. Artist Daniel McClendon and his wife bought the long abandoned building in 2011 and renovated it.

By the very early 20th century, Asheville's portion of French Broad riverfront had become a prime destination point for travelers and a pivotal recreational and leisure space for residents. The Asheville Electric Company created a small diversion off the French Broad and named it Riverside Park. The park erected a carousel, a boat house and a movie screen that could only be viewed from a boat in the river. At the time, this type of entertainment was not only unique but left a strong impression. Unfortunately, in 1915 a fire destroyed much of Riverside Park and the following year brought more devastation.

In 1916 massive flooding not only destroyed what remained of Riverview Park but swept away the watershed community. The many local industry and business owners – who for years had thrived along the French Broad River – abandoned their buildings and relocated to higher ground. Soon after, Asheville's traffic system experienced rapid growth, and new highways and roads cut off access points to the river.

Industries began leaving the area in the 1940s due to flooding. Over time, the French Broad defaulted to an unregulated dumping site and leisure enjoyment was impossible and forgotten.

=== The RiverFront Plan ===
This wouldn't change until the 1970s, when the federal government attended to the deteriorating state of the nation's river systems and passed the Clean Water Act. Under this new policy, environmental regulation standards were raised and public interest was heightened. Citizen groups began to look at the river and the Land-of-Sky Regional Council (LOS) assembled a group of conservation advocates, called the French Broad River Foundation (FBRF), to help create a series of access parks along the 117 miles of the French Broad River.

Due to advocacy of regional policy analysts, politicians and local agencies, conservation groups and economists reset the agenda to develop and redevelop the French Broad's riverfront. In 1987 the Tennessee Valley Authority (TVA) and the Land of Sky attained funding through a civil works planning grant. A loosely knit group of volunteers and conservation advocates known as the French Broad Riverfront Planning Commission were asked to team up with the French Broad River Foundation and Asheville's Chamber of Commerce to create the Asheville Riverfront Plan.

In the 1980s, as efforts to clean up the river intensified with citizen advocacy groups like the FBRF, policy makers came to finally see the critical importance of the French Broad River to the region. For one, local economists began to recognize the riverfront's massive recreational and economic development potential. Also, through a series of management studies and evaluations by the LOS and local government agencies, it was determined that for the region to grow, the French Broad would have to be Buncombe County's primary potable water source.

In 1986, Karen Cragnolin moved to Asheville and asked how she could contribute to the city. After being referred to the French Broad River Foundation, in 1987 she started RiverLink, a regional non-profit organization.

If the French Broad River was to be successfully revitalized, the final plan had to truly represent and incorporate the wants and needs of the entire community. To gain a better understanding of the natural complexities that Asheville's riverfront presented, RiverLink recruited members of the American Institute of Architects (AIA) & American Society of Landscape Architects (ASLA) to form a charette team. Peter Batchelor, the Chairman of the NC AIA, then divided the joint charette into three primary groups: The first team focused on how to effectively reestablish a connection between downtown Asheville and the riverfront. Another team concentrated on how far the river could extend within city limits. The third group analyzed the river's prominent attributes in Asheville and Western North Carolina.

In 1989, after extensive planning and public discussion, the charette team completed The Asheville Riverfront Plan. The design included a detailed layout of the riverfront, complete with diagrams of the urban corridor, maps of future greenway space and descriptions of the charrette’s findings and suggestions. More importantly, the plan's mixed use for revitalizing the French Broad River satisfied the needs of all the community – environmental, recreation and business constituents. At that time, few people believed the area along the river could be improved, much less a destination.

The design received nationwide recognition for its ingenuity and thoughtful craftsmanship upon public presentation. National Geographic featured the plan as a new greenway initiative for WNC in its June 1990 issue. Also, the Riverfront Plan received The American Planning Association’s Large Scale Planning Award, a prestigious honor given only to the best designs in the nation.

Local governments soon adopted the Asheville Riverfront Plan to depict a unified vision for a revitalized riverfront. Buncombe County welcomed it as their new Master Plan for the river way and the City of Asheville included the ARP as an addendum to its award winning 2010 Comprehensive Plan. The implementation process could begin a design framework needed for the entire revitalization of the riverfront.

During September 1991, with strong support from local government authorities and the public, RiverLink received funding from the National Endowment for the Arts to develop what is now known as The Asheville Riverfront Open Space Design Guidelines. Once again RiverLink helped assemble a charette team with ALSA/AIA, and groups were divided. This time issues such as signage, river access, public art, support facilities, structures and landscaping were addressed. Through public forums constituents came to agree that all open space development should accentuate the unique geographical op aspects of Asheville and Western North Carolina. When completed, like the Riverfront Plan, the Open Space Guidelines were well received by the public. Local governments immediately adopted them and they were approved by The Asheville Council. The OSG now influence the City of Asheville's river zoning district, river parks and greenways, serving as a blueprint for sustainable development.

=== The Wilma Dykeman RiverWay Plan ===
Throughout the 1990s RiverLink strived to bring the pieces of the Riverfront Plan together in a progressive manner.

In 1991 Carolina Power & Light Company offered RiverLink a two-mile-long donation of property which became the first link in the urban riverfront greenway. For years the west bank riverfront property had been used as an "unofficial" land fill for construction companies and concrete manufacturers. Once the donation of land from CP&L was accepted, RiverLink and The City of Asheville entered into a public-private partnership to develop it as the French Broad River Park & Greenway System.

With the city's help, RiverLink received a grant from The Z. Smith Reynolds Foundation to hire a landscape architecture firm to develop the master plan and construction drawings. A principal goal of the plan was to infuse characteristics of the old Riverside Park into The French Broad River Park. Also, RiverLink raised the funds needed to install picnic tables, benches, bike racks, bollards and other amenities. On September 21, 1994, the first part of the project was completed and the French Broad River Park became the first greenway (or watershed) built within the City of Asheville.

Phase two added another loop of greenway trails only a year after the first, in September 1995. In 1999, RiverLink received funding from the North Carolina Wildlife Resources Commission to implement the final phase, extending the greenway trail even further along the river next to Amboy Road. Moreover, in addition to the extension, the funding of this phase included a handicapped accessible fishing pier that was installed overlooking the river.

Asheville Motor Speedway on Amboy Road closed in 1999. RiverLink raised $1.6 million to purchase and develop the old speedway, then donated the site, with a conservation easement, to the city. The 50-acre site was rechristened as Carrier Park and joined the French Broad River Park System.

Much of the original design remained unrealized despite these accomplishments, however. Not only was there a lack of funding to continue implementation, but the Riverfront Plan had become outdated. Since the fifteen-year-old plan was first introduced, the zoning, demographics and development of Asheville's riverfront had vastly changed. Design modifications reflecting these new developments, diverging land use patterns and new community needs and desires along the river would be necessary.

By 2004, RiverLink had raised over $250,000 and was able to update the Riverfront Plan appropriately to accurately keep pace with current conditions and demands. Among those who financially contributed to its creation were: North Carolina Department of Transportation (DOT), The City of Asheville, Buncombe County, The Asheville Merchants Association, Tennessee Valley Authority (TVA), and Progress Energy.

An updated plan, a demonstration project for the entire French Broad River watershed, connected a 17 miles (27 km) Greenway System along the French Broad and Swannanoa Rivers and represented the consolidation of over 20 years of community planning. The greenway system would run along the French Broad River from Broadway Avenue through the central riverfront, along the WECAN neighborhood, through the recreational areas to the Amboy Road Exit of I-240. The plan also followed the Swannanoa River from its confluence with the French Broad through the Biltmore Village and up river to Tunnel Road and Azalea Park where it ended.

Similar to the original Riverfront Plan, though in significantly richer detail, the new design centered on three diverse concepts: First, with a road alignment study, it addressed specific development zones within the seventeen miles. Secondly, detailed site-plans and transportation engineering illustrations enhanced plan implementation. Lastly, market analysis demonstrated how the revitalization of the river could further reinforce traditional industries such as health/wellness, recreation, arts, crafts and entrepreneurship.

RiverLink had long emphasized that since the mid-1900s, many of their initiatives to revitalize the French Broad River had been previously championed by others.

One of the earliest advocates was a young author and educator named Wilma Dykeman, whose book "The French Broad," detailed the linkage between economic development and economic protection. Once the updated plan was refined and Asheville City Council adopted it, RiverLink aptly re-branded the new design as The Wilma Dykeman Riverway Plan.

As of 2010, by championing thousands of supporters and working with local government, RiverLink had contributed several popular parks and greenway extensions to The Wilma Dykeman Riverway Plan. The most notable of these achievements included the most-used park in the region, Carrier Park, and the French Broad River Park & Greenway System. Asheville's greenway system included 4.5 miles (7.2 km) of contiguous trail.

=== The River Arts District ===
Artists had moved into abandoned buildings in the 1970s, and the non-profit RiverLink began working to save the buildings. The 1989 plan began the formal process, which led to design guidelines in 1991 and the French Broad master plan in 1993.

RiverLink started the process of revitalizing the neighborhood in 1992 with the purchase of Warehouse Studios, which became a textile museum with small retail stores. Also in 1992, Pattiy Torno began renovations on several buildings she bought in 1989, making them available for artist studios, eventually calling them Curve Studios and Garden.

Artists began taking over abandoned warehouses. As of 2010, over 140 art studios occupied 16 buildings.

12 Bones Smokehouse, started in 2005, is a restaurant visited three times by President Barack Obama, though it has moved since then due to road improvements. 12 Bones added a second location in 2008 which will move for another road project.

New Belgium Brewing Company announced plans for a second Asheville brewery April 5, 2012. This operation would go on 20 acres that included a former landfill and a livestock market. This development was considered a major milestone in the district's development.

Also in 2012, 165 artists in 19 buildings opened their studios for the River Arts District Studio Stroll.

On January 22, 2013, the city council asked for a study of road, bicycle and sidewalk improvements referred to as the River Arts District Transportation Improvement Plan (RADTIP). The city council approved a $30 million plan on September 9, 2014, for property the city owned in the River Arts District. The Riverside Drive Redevelopment Plan included work on historic buildings, wetlands, and "visitor amenities". Funding included a TIGER grant of $14.6 million announced by U.S. Transportation Secretary Anthony Foxx in a visit to Asheville on September 12, 2014.

Because of the New Belgium project, the River Arts District experienced significant growth. RADTIP had an estimated cost of $34.3 million, with the city's total expected contribution of $17.5 million, including $9 million from the 2015–16 budget. Its purpose was to upgrade roads and add sidewalks, greenways, bike lanes and infrastructure improvements. A later estimate of $50 million went even higher as total bids and other costs ended up at $76 million. On June 27, 2017, the city council changed the plan to reduce the cost to $54.6 million. This action allowed the federal grant to be used, along with hotel tax revenues of $2.5 million. After the addition of $6 million, the city's contribution totalled $32 million. Dropped from the plan were three of the greenways, and other improvements would be scaled back. Work on the plan began in August 2017.

=== Hurricane Helene and Post-Storm Recovery and Renaissance ===
In late September 2024, Hurricane Helene triggered catastrophic flooding along the French Broad River, inundating much of the River Arts District (RAD). According to local reports, approximately 80% of the district's studios and buildings were damaged or destroyed. However, recovery efforts began quickly, with volunteers converging to help salvage artworks, clean studios and assist displaced artists. Local organizations and non‑profits launched grants and emergency relief funding, providing stipends and business recovery grants to producers in the RAD. These and similar initiatives resulted in most of the businesses in the RAD, including galleries, studios, restaurants and breweries, being reopened by the Autumn of 2025. This effort resulted in the RAD Renaissance, and was marked with numerous milestones including the reopening of flagship galleries and businesses including The Marquee, The Aura Arts Building, and Wedge Brewing Co. In addition, numerous new studios and galleries opened as part of the recovery, including RAD Rendezvous and the new River Arts District Welcome Center.
