= Assault on Mount Mitchell =

Annual bicycling endurance contest

The Assault on Mount Mitchell is an annual bicycling endurance contest in South Carolina and North Carolina first held in 1974.

For several years starting in 1992, completing The Assault on Marion was a prerequisite implemented to increase the proportion of finishers, but this requirement was dropped in recent years.

The ride starts in Spartanburg, South Carolina and ends at the summit of Mount Mitchell in Mount Mitchell State Park in Yancey County, North Carolina. The ride distance is 102 miles (164 km) and has over 11,000 vertical feet of climbing. Most riders finish in less than 12 hours; the leaders finish in under 6 hours. The contest typically includes over 800 cyclists from across the globe.

It spawned the Off-Road Assault on Mount Mitchell, which has taken place since 1999.

The record number of consecutive finishes is 40 (as of 2020), held by Michael H. Davis.

Scottie Weiss holds the record for the fastest finish, 4:54, set in 2012.

As of 2015, the contest has a charitable component, The Freewheelers Cycling Association. This 501(c)(3) organization is partnered with nonprofit organizations such as the Humane Society and Mt. Mitchell State Park.

As a result of the Covid-19 pandemic, the contest was cancelled for the years 2020 and 2021.
