= Mount Mitchell State Park =

State park in Yancey County, North Carolina, United States

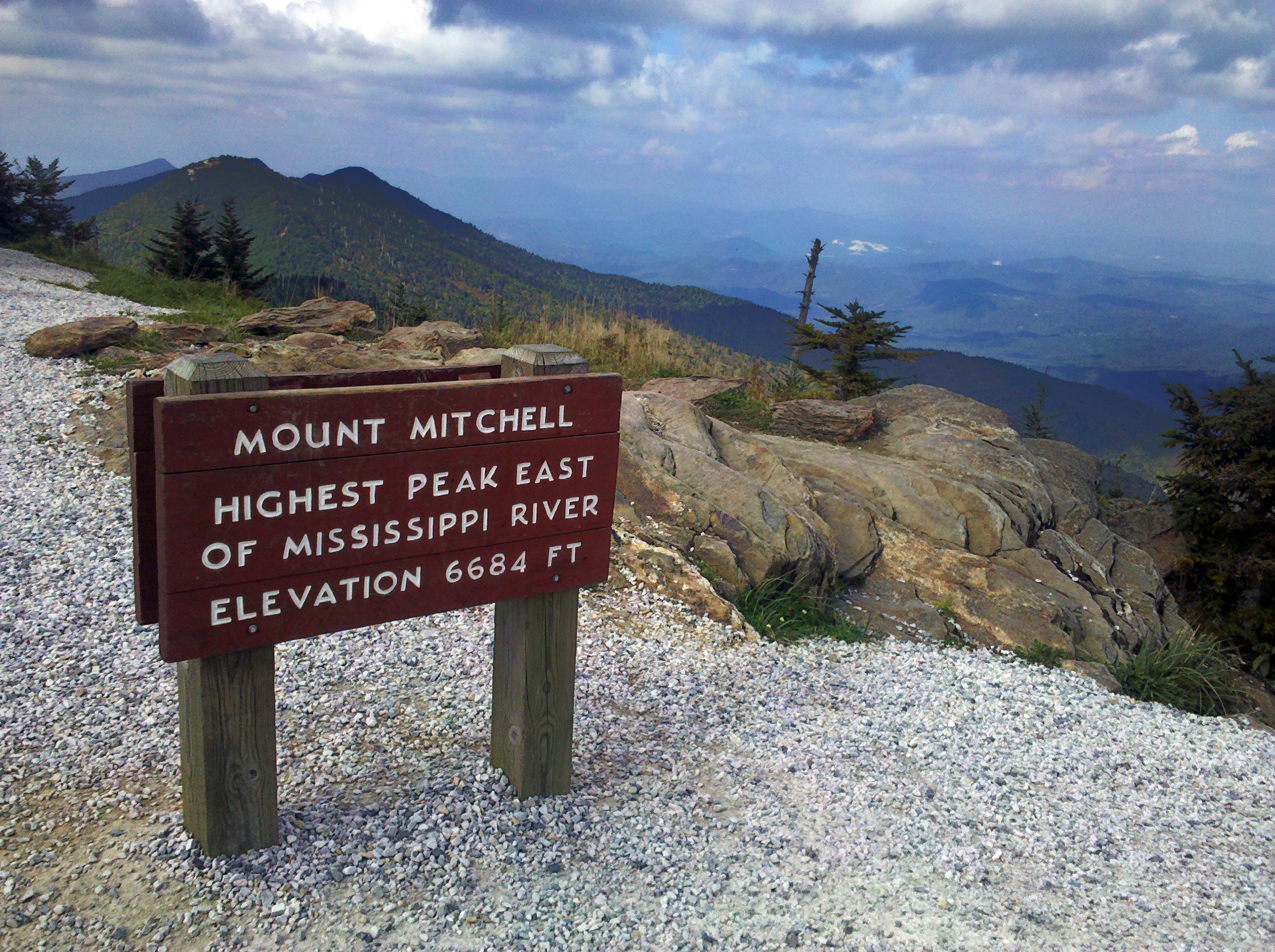

- Location within North Carolina Location within the United States
- Interactive map of Mount Mitchell State Park
- Location: Yancey County, North Carolina, United States
- Coordinates: 35°45′53″N 82°15′55″W
- Area: 4,789 acres (1,938 ha)
- Elevation: 6,366 ft (1,940 m)
- Established: 1916
- Administrator: North Carolina Division of Parks and Recreation
- Website: Official website

Mount Mitchell State Park is a 4,789-acre (1,938 ha) North Carolina state park in Yancey County, North Carolina in the United States. Located at the end of NC 128 off the Blue Ridge Parkway near Burnsville, North Carolina, it includes the peak of Mount Mitchell, the highest peak east of the Mississippi River. Established in 1915 by the state legislature, it became the first state park of North Carolina. The North Carolina State Parks System was established in the same bill.

== Features ==
In addition to Mount Mitchell itself, the park encompasses several other peaks which top out at over 6,000 feet (1,800 m) in elevation, including Mount Hallback, Mount Craig (just 52 feet (16 m) shy of Mount Mitchell in elevation and the second highest peak east of the Mississippi River), Big Tom, and Balsam Cone. Trails lead to all of these summits save Mount Hallback. About 8 miles (13 km) of trails exist within the park in all.

From the parking lot, a steep paved path leads visitors to the summit and a raised observation platform with 360 degree views. The grave of Elisha Mitchell, the professor who first noted the mountain's height, is located at the base of the observation platform. The old observation tower was torn down in early October 2006. The trail leading to the summit has been paved, and a new observation platform was constructed and opened to the public in January 2009. A museum is open seasonally at the summit with information about the mountain's natural, cultural and historical heritage. The park operates a restaurant and a small tent camping sites seasonally. The buildings were built in the 1950s and renovation is planned. Most visitors come between May and November because the only access is the Blue Ridge Parkway. The park is staffed year-round, but can become difficult to reach during the worst weather conditions.

The park had 398,000 visitors in 2017.

Robert McGraw has been superintendent of the park since 2020.

Another destination accessible by trail within the park is Camp Alice, located south of the summit of Mount Mitchell at an elevation of 5800 ft (1767.84 m). This historic site is the location of a logging and, later, Civilian Conservation Corps tourist camp at the terminus of the old Mount Mitchell toll road. Lower Creek, one of the highest elevation perennial streams in the Appalachians, flows across the main trail at this point.

== Gallery ==
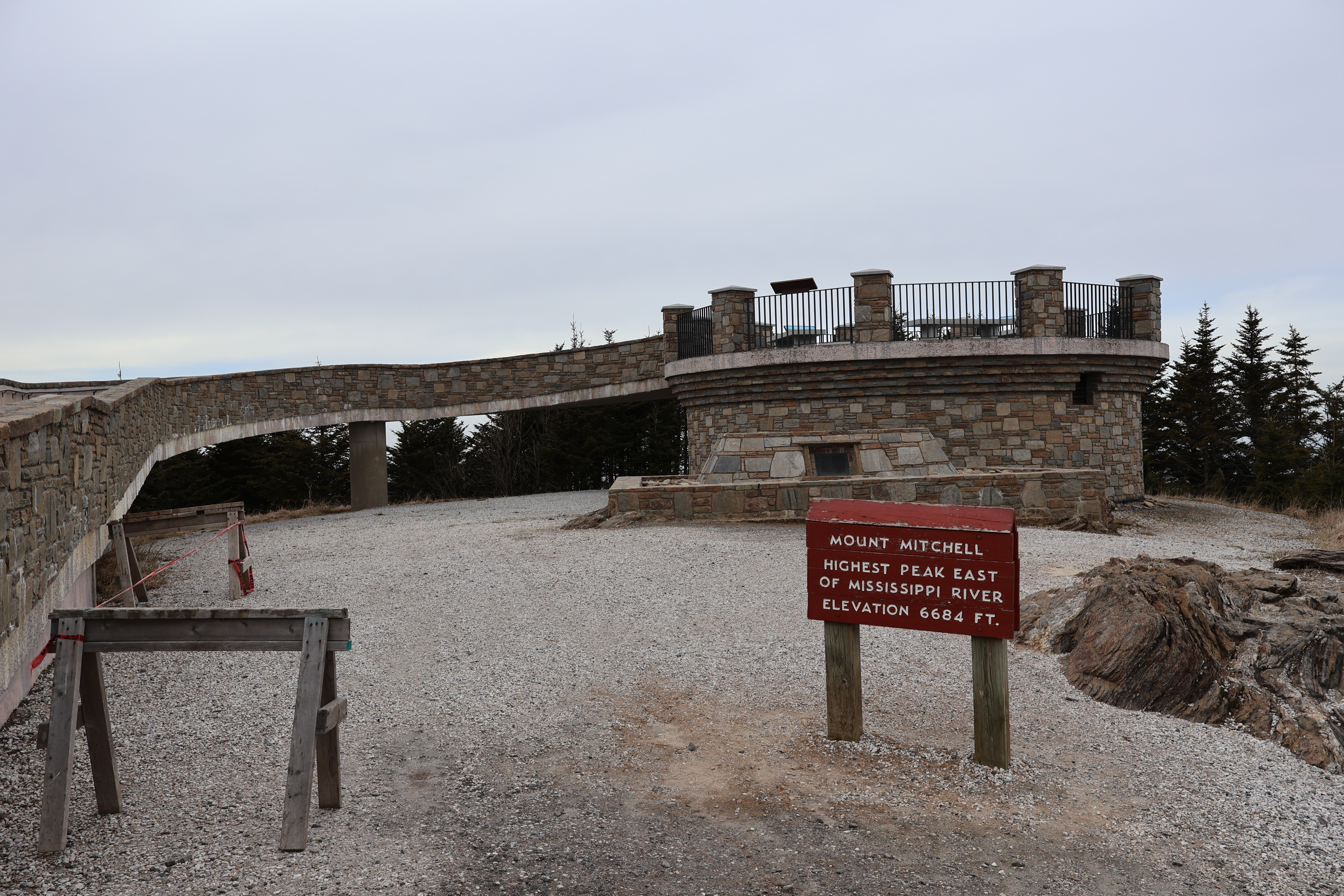
Observation deck on the peak of Mount Mitchell

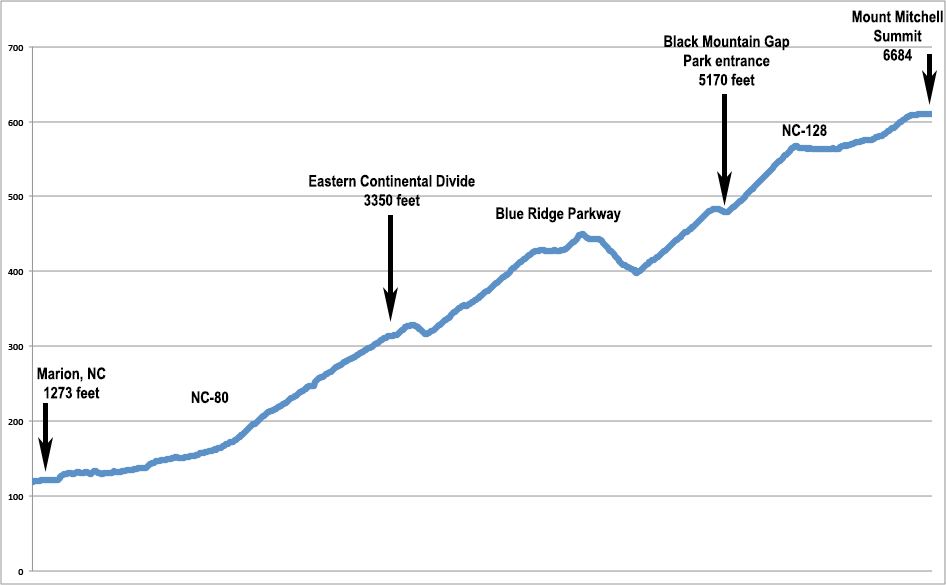
Elevation change along the drive reaching the park from Marion, NC along NC-80, the Blue Ridge Parkway and NC-128

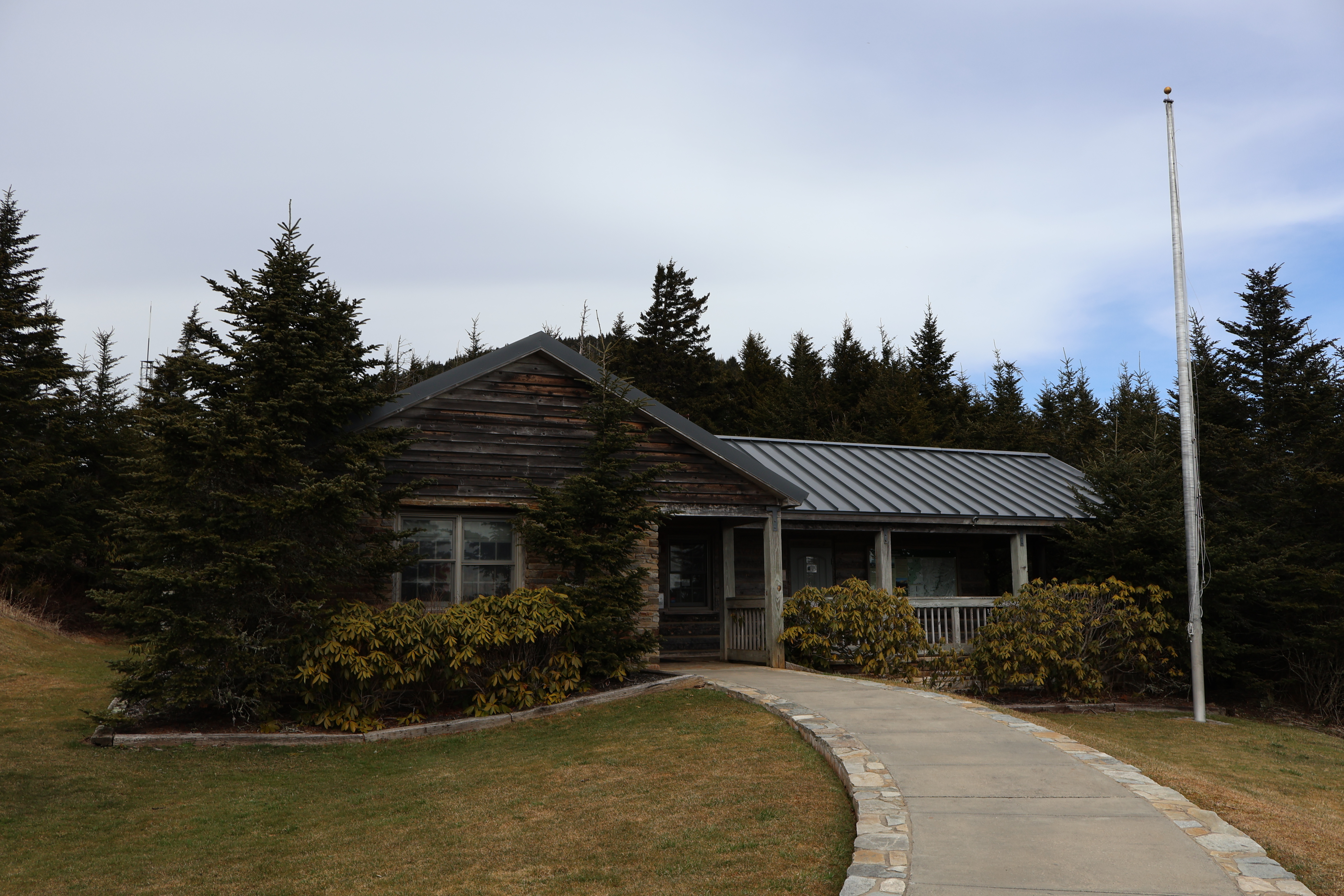
Mount Mitchell State Park Office

== Events ==
The park serves as the finish line for The Assault on Mount Mitchell and the midpoint for the Mount Mitchell Challenge ultramarathon.

== Hurricane Helene ==
The park closed on September 26, 2024 as Hurricane Helene approached the area. Due to extensive storm-related damage to sections of the Blue Ridge Parkway, the park remained closed for nearly a year while roads were repaired. The park reopened on September 15, 2025.

== See also ==
- Mountains-to-Sea Trail
