= Busick, North Carolina =

- Populated place
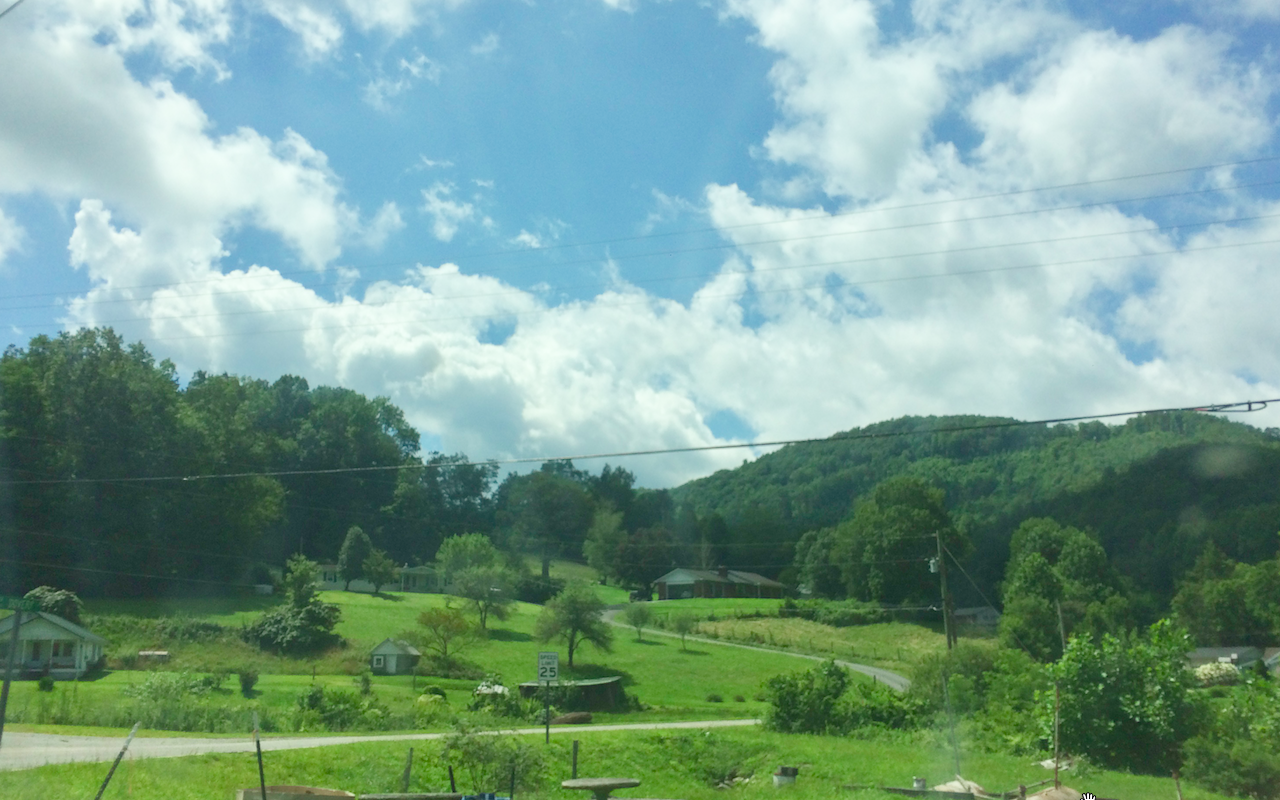
- Interactive map of Busick, North Carolina
- Coordinates: 35°46′11″N 82°10′58″W
- Country: United States
- State: North Carolina
- County: Yancey
- Township: South Toe
- Elevation: 2,930 ft (890 m)
- Time zone: UTC-5 (Eastern (EST))
  - Summer (DST): UTC-4 (EDT)
- Area code: 828
- GNIS feature ID: 1019439

Busick is a populated place in the South Toe Township of Yancey County, North Carolina, United States. It is the settlement nearest to Mount Mitchell State Park by road. Busick is the site of the highest measured rainfall amount of 30.78 inches from Hurricane Helene and the preceding rainfall event from September 25-27, 2024.

== Geography ==
Busick is located in the Still Fork Creek valley along North Carolina Highway 80, approximately one mile west of the Blue Ridge Parkway. The South Toe River flows past about one mile to the west by Mount Mitchell Golf Club.
