= Wilma Dykeman RiverWay Plan =

The Wilma Dykeman RiverWay Plan is RiverLink's design to redevelop the urban riverfront corridor of the U.S. City of Asheville, as a demonstration project for the entire French Broad River watershed by connecting a 17 miles (27 km) Greenway System along the French Broad and Swannanoa Rivers. It was built and expanded on a former Plan created by RiverLink in 1989, called the Asheville Riverfront Plan, which won the American Planning Association Award and represents the consolidation of over 20 years of community planning.

== Objectives ==
Aside from providing environmental benefits, and recreational and wellness opportunities, the Wilma Dykeman RiverWay Plan is expected to revitalize the riverfront by encouraging economic development and job creation. Proponents of the plan say that with a cost benefit analysis, the essence of The Wilma Dykeman RiverWay Plan speaks for itself in terms of return on investment, tax base enhancement, bond rating improvement, job creation, mixed-use trails and sustainable development. Furthermore, the connectivity of The RiverWay would encourage multi-modal transportation opportunities like bicycling, and enhance access to the city's riverfronts.

However, the full implementation of The RiverWay is a complex and expensive task. Nevertheless, RiverLink has continued to further the plan by attaining riverfront parcels through conservation easement donations and property sales. In addition, state and federal governments have played a role in funding the Dykeman Plan, primarily through grants from the Department of Transportation.

Since its inception in 1987, RiverLink, a regional non-profit organization, has spearheaded The RiverWay by gaining public support and partnering with local, state, regional and federal agencies, the public at large, private foundations, Buncombe County, and the City of Asheville for the plan's implementation.

As of now, by championing thousands of supporters and working with local government, RiverLink has contributed several popular parks and greenway extensions to The Wilma Dykeman Riverway Plan. The most notable of these achievements include the old Asheville-Weaverville Speedway – the most-used park in the region now known as Carrier Park – and the French Broad River Park & Greenway System. Asheville's greenway system currently boasts 4.5 miles (7.2 km) of contiguous trail.

RiverLink founder, Karen Cragnolin served as its executive director for over 30 years.

Under her leadership the plans were developed that led to over 200 million dollars of investment from federal and state transportation agencies. Junk yards are being reclaimed as public open space and the French Broad River watershed is a prime destination and melting pot for the community.

== Background ==
Many local industry and business owners – who for years had thrived along the French Broad River - abandoned their buildings and relocated to higher ground. Asheville's traffic system experienced rapid growth, and new highways and roads cut off access points to the river. Over time, the French Broad defaulted to an unregulated dumping site and leisure enjoyment was impossible and forgotten. Eventually citizen groups began to look at the river and the Land-of-Sky Regional Council (LOS) assembled a group of conservation advocates, called the French Broad River Foundation (FBRF), to help create a series of access parks along the 117 miles of the French Broad River. In the 1980s, as efforts to clean up the river intensified with citizen advocacy groups like the FBRF, policy makers came to finally see the critical importance of the French Broad River to the region. For one, local economists began to recognize the riverfront's massive recreational and economic development potential.

Due to advocacy of regional policy analysts, politicians and local agencies, conservation groups and economists reset the agenda to develop and redevelop the French Broad's riverfront. In 1987 the Tennessee Valley Authority (TVA) and the Land of Sky attained funding through a civil works planning grant. At this time RiverLink, a loosely knit group of volunteers and conservation advocates known as the French Broad Riverfront Planning Commission, were asked to team up with the French Broad River Foundation and Asheville's Chamber of Commerce to create the Asheville Riverfront Plan, completed in 1989. The design included a detailed layout of the riverfront, complete with diagrams of the urban corridor, maps of future greenway space and descriptions of findings and suggestions. More importantly, the plan's mixed use for revitalizing the French Broad River satisfied the needs of all the community – environmental, recreation and business constituents.

The design received nationwide recognition for its ingenuity and thoughtful craftsmanship upon public presentation. National Geographic featured the plan as a new greenway initiative for WNC in its June 1990 issue. Also, the Riverfront Plan received The American Planning Association’s Large Scale Planning Award, a prestigious honor given only to the best designs in the nation.

During September, 1991, with strong support from local government authorities and the public, RiverLink received funding from the National Endowment for the Arts to develop what is now known as The Asheville Riverfront Open Space Design Guidelines. RiverLink helped assemble a charette team with ALSA/AIA, and groups were divided. This time issues such as signage, river access, public art, support facilities, structures and landscaping were addressed. Through public forums constituents came to agree that all open space development should accentuate the unique geographical op aspects of Asheville and Western North Carolina. When completed, like the Riverfront Plan, the Open Space Guidelines were well received by the public. Local governments immediately adopted them and they were approved by The Asheville Council. The OSG now influence the City of Asheville's river zoning district, river parks and greenways, serving as a blueprint for sustainable development.

== The Wilma Dykeman RiverWay Plan ==
Throughout the 1990s RiverLink strived to bring the pieces of the Riverfront Plan together in a progressive manner.

Thanks to rousing public support, the environmental organization acquired several large contaminated parcels along the French Broad River in West Asheville. Combining the power of their volunteers and partnership with the City of Asheville, RiverLink was able to convert the land into active-use parks and greenways.

Much of the original design remained unrealized despite these accomplishments, however. Not only was there a lack of funding to continue implementation, but the Riverfront Plan had become outdated. Since the fifteen-year-old plan was first introduced, the zoning, demographics and development of Asheville's riverfront had vastly changed. Design modifications reflecting these new developments, diverging land use patterns and new community needs and desires along the river would be necessary.

By 2004, RiverLink had raised over $250,000 and was able to update the Riverfront Plan appropriately to accurately keep pace with current conditions and demands. Among those who financially contributed to its creation were: North Carolina Department of Transportation (DOT), The City of Asheville, Buncombe County, The Asheville Merchants Association, Tennessee Valley Authority (TVA), and Progress Energy.

The new plan increased the greenway to 17 miles along the French Broad River from Broadway Avenue through the central riverfront, along the WECAN neighborhood, through the recreational areas to the Amboy Road Exit of I-240. The plan also follows the Swannanoa from its confluence with the French Broad through the Biltmore Village and up river to Tunnel Road and Azalea Park where it ends.

More concisely, the updated plan “linked the French Broad and Swannanoa Rivers into a continuous pathway with separate walking and biking trails anchored on the south at the North Carolina Arboretum, on the east by the Blue Ridge Parkway, and on the north by the University of North Carolina Asheville (UNCA)”.

However, it's evident that the amended plan intended much bigger ideas and developments than just greenways. Similar to the original Riverfront Plan, though in significantly richer detail, the new design centered on three diverse concepts: First, with a road alignment study, it addressed specific development zones within the seventeen miles. Secondly, detailed site-plans and transportation engineering illustrations enhanced plan implementation. Lastly, market analysis demonstrated how the revitalization of the river could further reinforce traditional industries such as health/wellness, recreation, arts, crafts and entrepreneurship.

RiverLink had long emphasized that since the mid-1900s, many of their initiatives to revitalize the French Broad River had been previously championed by others.

One of the earliest advocates was a young author and educator named Wilma Dykeman, whose book “The French Broad,” detailed the linkage between economic development and economic protection. Once the updated plan was refined and Asheville City Council adopted it, RiverLink aptly re-branded the new design as The Wilma Dykeman Riverway Plan.

== Parks and greenways ==
There are several parks and greenways incorporated within The Wilma Dykeman RiverWay Plan. Amongst these are:

=== French Broad River Park & Greenway System ===
The initial breakthrough to gain riverside property occurred in 1991, when the non-profit organization, RiverLink, was offered a two-mile-long donation from the Carolina Power & Light Company. This property is now known as the first link in the urban riverfront greenway. For years the west bank riverfront property had been used as an “unofficial” land fill for construction companies and concrete manufactures. However, beyond the poison ivy infested and trash littered terrain RiverLink saw potential and convinced the city to receive the donation.

It is at this time that the organization created a concept called, “The Mayor’s Greenway Award” and presented it to CP&L during a reception at city hall. This award was a symbol of goodwill and community enrichment and has since become used as an incentive to encourage other citizens and corporations to donate land for public access along The Wilma Dykeman Riverway's identified greenway routes.

Once the donation of land from CP&L was accepted, RiverLink and The City of Asheville entered into a public-private partnership to develop it. In accordance to The RiverWay Plan, the implementation of the two-mile riverfront stretch in West Asheville was divided into three phases. It would be eventually named the French Broad River Park & Greenway System.

=== French Broad River Park ===
During phase one of the French Broad River Greenway System, with the City's help, RiverLink received a grant from The Z. Smith Reynolds Foundation to hire a landscape architecture firm to develop the master plan and construction drawings. A principal goal of the plan was to infuse characteristics of the old Riverside Park into The French Broad River Park. Once the design was complete, RiverLink's staff & volunteers worked with The City of Asheville's Parks & Recreation Department to develop the park. Also, RiverLink raised the funds needed to install picnic tables, benches, bike racks, bollards and other amenities that make the greenways at French Broad River Park phases I, II and III user-friendly and comfortable.

On September 21, 1994 the first part of the project was completed and the French Broad River Park became the first greenway (or watershed) built within the City of Asheville.

=== French Broad River Park Greenway Extension ===
Soon after the initial park was completed, phase two began. This phase added another loop of greenway trails as well as a dog park and wildflower garden to the park. Again relying heavily on community involvement and with a corresponding relationship with the City's Parks & Recreation Department, this phase was completed only a year after the first - In September 1995. For the first two years RiverLink was vital in operating The French Broad River Park however it is now maintained regularly by The City of Asheville Parks and Recreation Department.

It was not until four years later, in 1999, that RiverLink received funding from the North Carolina Wildlife Resources Commission to implement the final phase of The French Broad River Greenway. Phase three extended the greenway trail even further along the river next to Amboy Road. Moreover, in addition to the extension, the funding of this phase included a handicapped accessible fishing pier that was installed overlooking the river.

=== Carrier Park ===
The second major breakthrough for The Wilma Dykeman Riverway Plan occurred in 1999, when RiverLink managed to obtain the former Asheville-Weaverville Speedway on Amboy Road (35.56583°N 82.58132°W) (which is still in development as of April 2011). After raising $1.6 million to purchase and develop the old speedway, RiverLink donated it, with a conservation easement, to the City of Asheville. As like before, during the development of The French Broad River Park & Greenway, RiverLink and the city worked closely together to implement the park. Foremost, city employees with expertise in park development resurfaced the racetrack, which now invites Asheville cyclist and non-motor races.

Furthermore, with a combined effort from citizens and city employees an outdoors education wetland/stormwater Education Center was constructed, along with: basketball courts, bocce ball/bowling alleys, volleyball courts, an in-line skating ring, and a combination of baseball & soccer fields. Also, by rallying 1000 volunteers in five days, RiverLink built a playground to add to the park. When it was all complete the 50-acre old speedway was rechristened as Carrier Park and joined the French Broad River Park System.
