= Wilma Dykeman =

American writer

- Born: May 20, 1920
- Died: December 22, 2006 (aged 86)
- Education: Biltmore Junior College; Northwestern University
- Writing career
- Subject: Appalachia

Wilma Dykeman Stokely (May 20, 1920 – December 22, 2006) was an American writer of fiction and nonfiction whose works chronicled the people and land of Appalachia.

== Biography ==
Dykeman grew up in the Beaverdam community of Buncombe County, North Carolina, now part of Asheville. She was the only child of Bonnie Cole Dykeman and Willard Dykeman. Her father had relocated to the Asheville area from New York as a widower with two grown children, and had met and married her mother in Asheville. He was 60 years old when Wilma was born and died when Wilma was 14 years old. In later life, she credited both of her parents for giving her a love of reading and her father for giving her a love of nature and a curiosity about the world around her.

She attended Biltmore Junior College (now the University of North Carolina at Asheville), graduating in 1938, and Northwestern University, where she graduated in 1940 with a major in speech.

In August 1940, shortly after her graduation from Northwestern, she was introduced to her future husband, James R. Stokely Jr., by Mabel Wolfe, the sister of Asheville writer Thomas Wolfe. Stokely, of Newport, Tennessee, was a son of the president of Stokely Brothers Canning Company (which in 1933 bought Van Camp to become Stokely-Van Camp Inc. The Stokely brand of canned food is now a brand of Seneca Foods and Van Camps a brand of Conagra Inc.) The couple married just two months after they met. They had two sons, Dykeman Stokely and James R. "Rory" Stokely III. The couple maintained homes in Asheville and Newport, and Dykeman continued to divide her time between both homes after Stokely died in 1977. Dykeman and Stokely wrote several books together, including Neither Black Nor White, a pioneering 1957 book about race relations in the South which included interviews with Blacks as well as Whites from all walks of life. Medgar Evers, for example, told Dykeman and Stokely that "we are treated like dogs." On the strength of this Sidney Hillman Award-winning book, Dykeman and Stokely wrote approximately 20 articles for The New York Times Magazine during the late 1950s and early 1960s, providing periodic reports on the state of the civil rights movement. Their article "Montgomery Morning" is collected in the Library of America's Reporting Civil Rights, Volume 1.

Wilma Dykeman became the first female trustee of Berea College and the first female Tennessee State Historian. Her first novel, The Tall Woman, was one of the first realistic novels portraying life in the Southern mountains and is still in print. Because of her world-class speaking skills, and a boundless energy that took her to workshops, classrooms, and other venues throughout the region, Dykeman is sometimes referred to as "the mother of Appalachian Studies."

Dykeman died on December 22, 2006, after suffering complications from a fractured hip and subsequent hip replacement surgery. She is buried at Beaverdam Baptist Church cemetery next to her mother near her childhood home.

After Dykeman's death, Appalachian writer Jeff Daniel Marion called the couple's marriage a "partnership in every sense of the word," describing Dykeman and Stokely as "partners in writing, partners in marriage and partners in having similar points of view."

In addition to this, in honor of Wilma Dykeman who strongly advocated for linkage between economic development and environmental protection along the French Broad River, both the City of Asheville and Buncombe County in Western North Carolina have adopted the Wilma Dykeman RiverWay Plan - a 17-mile greenway and park system that intends to revitalize sustainable economic growth along the French Broad and Swannanoa River.

== Works ==
=== Books ===
Dykeman wrote a total of eighteen books, including both nonfiction and fiction.

Her first book, The French Broad, was published in 1955 as part of the Holt Rinehart Rivers of America Series.

Dykeman wrote three novels: The Tall Woman (1962), The Far Family (1966), and Return the Innocent Earth (1973). The main character in The Tall Woman is a mountain woman who works to bring a community together after the Civil War. The Far Family continues the story of that same woman's family, generations later. Return the Innocent Earth recalls the Stokely family's legacy, examining modern industry through a fictionalized Tennessee canning company. The book portrayed the Clayburns, a poor but enterprising family who went into the canning business in a small mountain town called Churchill around 1900.

Dykeman's 1975 book Too Many People, Too Little Love is a biography of Edna Rankin McKinnon, a pioneer in family planning.

Dykeman was also chosen for the prestigious honor of authoring "Tennessee, A History", published in 1975, as part of The States and the Nation series in celebration of our nation's bicentennial. The series, which includes 51 books, one for each state and the District of Columbia, was administered by the American Association for State and Local History via a grant from the National Endowment for the Humanities.

=== Newspaper columns and magazine articles ===
From 1962 to 2000, she was a columnist for the Knoxville News-Sentinel newspaper, contributing as many as three columns each week. When introducing her as a new columnist, the paper's editor announced that Dykeman would write under the title "The Simple Life," which would be "a momentary turning aside, a glimpse down a different path, to see, hear, feel, ponder the common uniqueness of our lives" and communicate "the salt of humor, gnarled strength of old ideals, the variety of new ideas and the friendship of people well-known and little-known along the way." Two collections of her columns were published in book form: The Simple Life and Explorations (1984). She also contributed regular columns to the Newport Plain Talk newspaper. Dykeman's writings also appeared in magazines including The New York Times magazine, U.S. News & World Report, Harper's, and Reader's Digest.

== Public speaking and education activities ==
Dykeman was popular as a public speaker, giving 50 to 75 lectures a year by her own estimate. She also taught classes at Berea College and the University of Tennessee in Knoxville. She was a member of Board of Trustees for Berea College and the advisory board of the University of North Carolina. During the period 1978 to 1982 she served as a consultant to the Children's Museum of Oak Ridge for its "An Appalachian Experience" public education project, of which her son James R. Stokely III was executive director. The project resulted in the development of teaching materials on Appalachia and the 1982 publication of An Encyclopedia of East Tennessee, edited by James R. Stokely III and Jeff D. Johnson (ISBN 978-0-9606832-0-8).

== Awards and honors ==
Dykeman received many awards and other recognitions. In 1981, Tennessee governor Lamar Alexander named her official state historian, an honorary role that she filled until 2002. In 1985 she received the North Carolina Award for literature. In 1957 she shared the Sidney Hillman Award with her husband, James Stokely, for their book Neither Black Nor White, which was recognized as the best book of the year on world peace, race relations or civil liberties. In 1994, she received the Pride of Tennessee Award from Governor Ned Ray McWherter, honoring her commitment to community, education, and advancement of the humanities. McWherter said, "She has managed to capture and truthfully portray the people, places, and events that make East Tennessee and Appalachia a unique place in world culture." Other awards she received include the Thomas Wolfe Memorial Trophy, a Guggenheim Fellowship (in 1956), a National Endowment for the Humanities Senior Fellowship, and the Tennessee Conservation Writer of the Year Award. She also was inducted into the North Carolina Hall of Fame and received honorary degrees from several colleges and universities.

== Legacy ==
The Appalachian Writers Guild's Wilma Dykeman Award for Essay is named in her honor. This recognition is awarded each year for the best essay on Appalachian life and literature, religion, folklore, culture, or values. The East Tennessee Historical Society also has given a Wilma Dykeman Award for Regional Historical Literature.

In 2012, Dykeman's younger son and daughter-in-law founded the Wilma Dykeman Legacy, a nonprofit based in Weaverville, North Carolina that develops and sponsors diverse and inclusive talks, workshops, events, books, and other programs, products and services to sustain the following core values for which Wilma Dykeman stood and worked: environmental integrity, social justice, and the power of the written and spoken word.

On March 23, 2021, the Asheville city council voted to name the 2-mile-long French Broad River East Bank Greenway after Dykeman. Eventually, this greenway will be extended to 3.5 miles.

A species of spider is named for Dykeman.
