= North Carolina Highway 128 =

State highway in Yancey County, North Carolina, US

North Carolina Highway 128

Route information
- Maintained by NCDOT
- Length: 4.6 mi (7.4 km)
- Existed: 1947–present
- Tourist routes: Mount Mitchell Scenic Drive

Major junctions
- South end: Blue Ridge Parkway (milepost 355)
- North end: Mount Mitchell State Park

Location
- Country: United States
- State: North Carolina
- Counties: Yancey

Highway system
- North Carolina Highway System; Interstate; US; State; Scenic
← NC 127	→ US 129

North Carolina Highway 128 (NC 128) is a primary state highway in the U.S. state of North Carolina. It runs from the Blue Ridge Parkway (mile marker 355) to Mount Mitchell State Park. Reaching an elevation of over 6,400 feet (2,000 m), it is the highest (of any) road or highway east of the Mississippi River.

== Route description ==
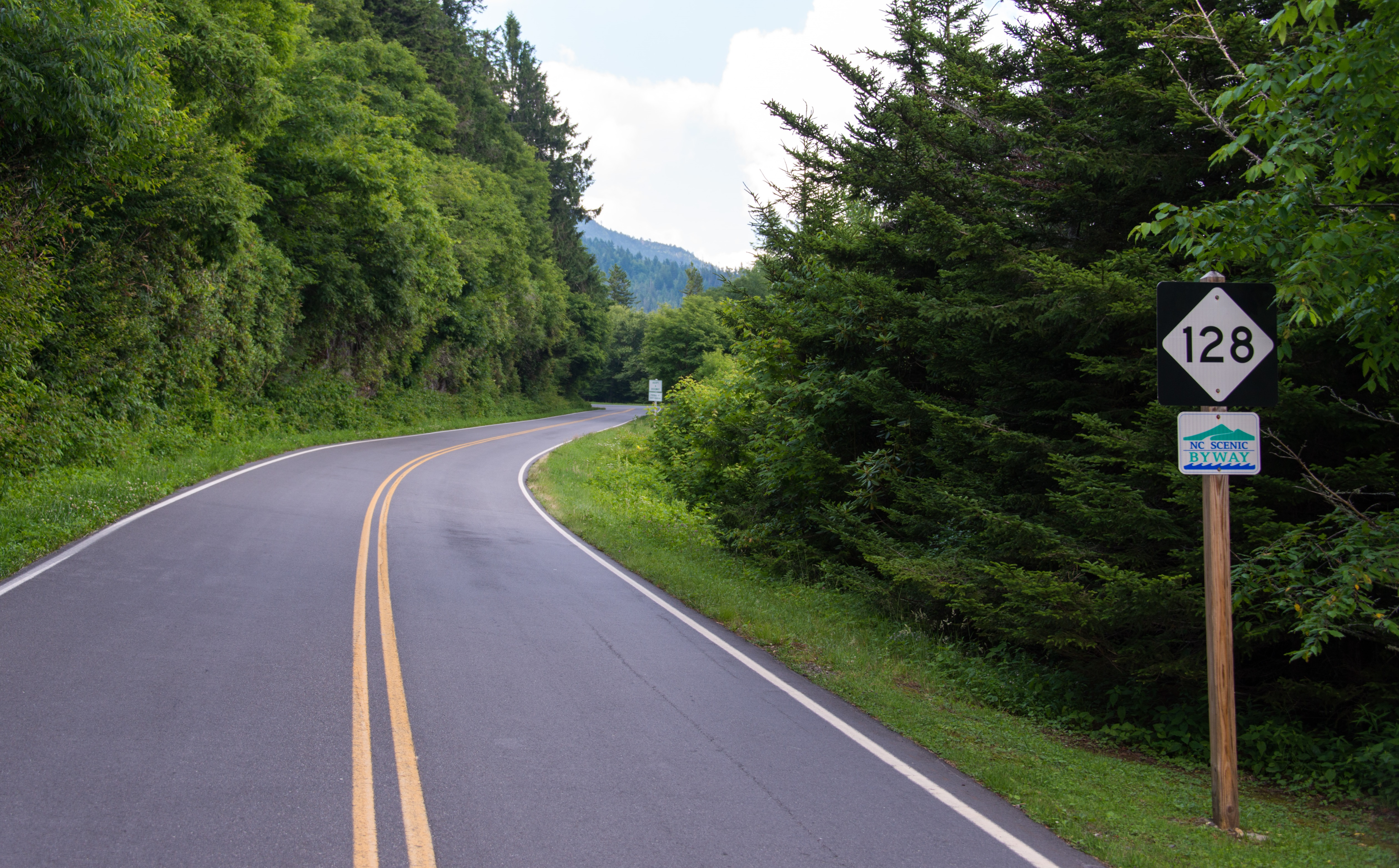
Mount Mitchell Scenic Drive

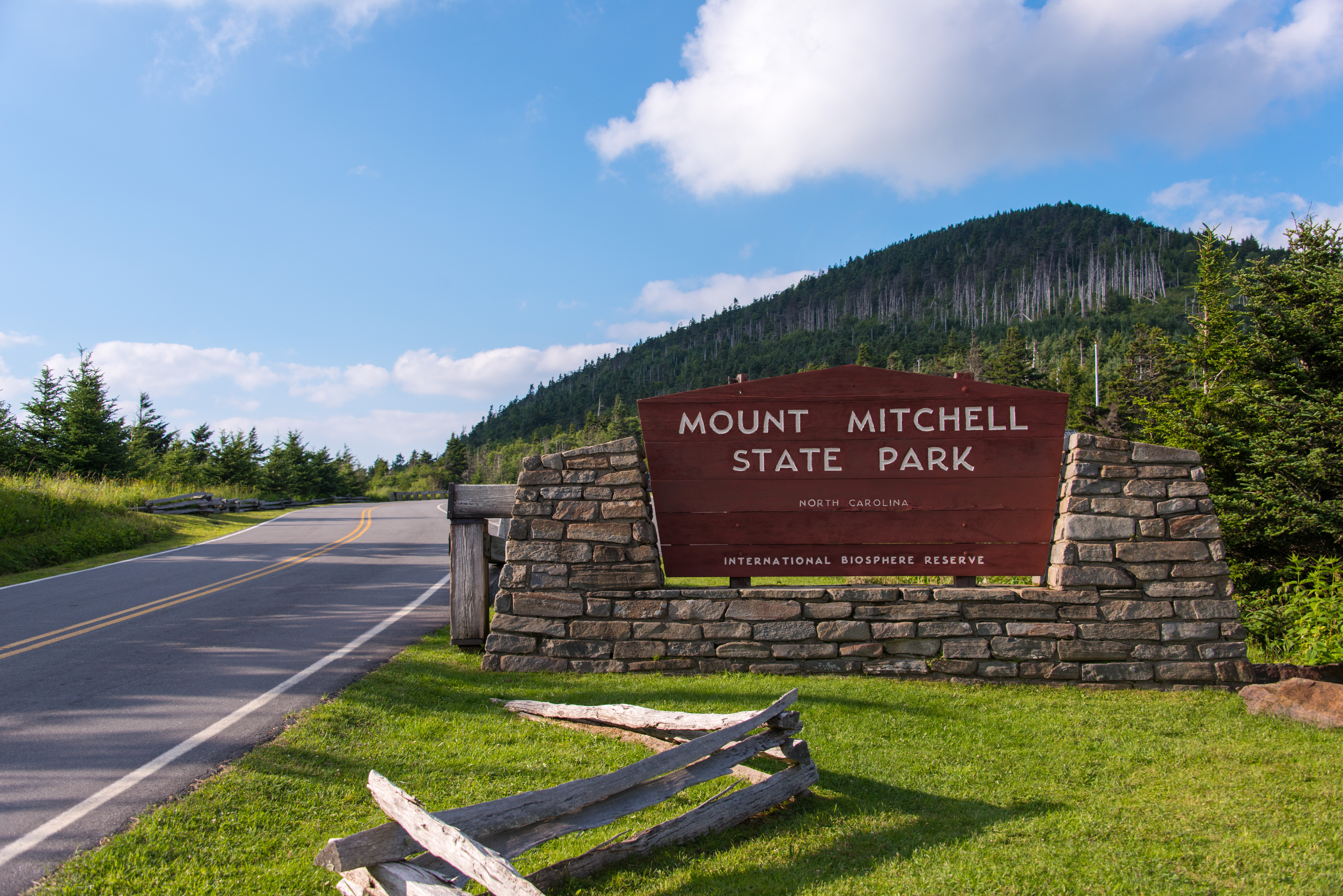
Mount Mitchell State Park

The route serves as a spur from the Blue Ridge Parkway to Mount Mitchell. The highway begins at mile marker 355 on the Blue Ridge Parkway (on the border of Yancey and Buncombe counties); once past the gates, drivers are greeted by the only NC 128 shield on the whole route, its only indication (other than on a map) that it is a state highway. The two-lane road has mild curves as it enters Mount Mitchell State Park. It continues its ascent until it ends at the state park's parking lot, just below the summit of Mount Mitchell, the highest point in eastern North America.

The highway does not cross any primary or secondary routes. Only one service road (Radio Station Road) connects, making it the most isolated route in the state. If the Blue Ridge Parkway is closed due to inclement weather, access to NC 128 is cut-off.

NC 128 is also part of one scenic byway in the state (indicated by a Scenic Byways sign). Mount Mitchell Scenic Drive is an 52-mile (84 km) byway from the I-26 exit 9 to the top of Mount Mitchell, via US 19, US 19E, NC 80, Blue Ridge Parkway and NC 128. This designation became official in 2011.

== History ==
In 1922, the first NC 128 existed briefly, originally running from Scotland Neck to Rich Square. It was quickly renumbered to NC 125 (now US 258). The current route was numbered NC 128, on or around 1947, as a new primary route and has remained unchanged since. The road itself existed earlier as a toll road on a 1936 county map.

== Junction list ==
The entire route is in Yancey County.

Location	mi	km	Destinations	Notes
	0.0	0.0	Blue Ridge Parkway	Milepost 355
	4.6	7.4	Mount Mitchell State Park	Parking lot
1.000 mi = 1.609 km; 1.000 km = 0.621 mi
