= Mount Mitchell =

Highest mountain in North Carolina, United States

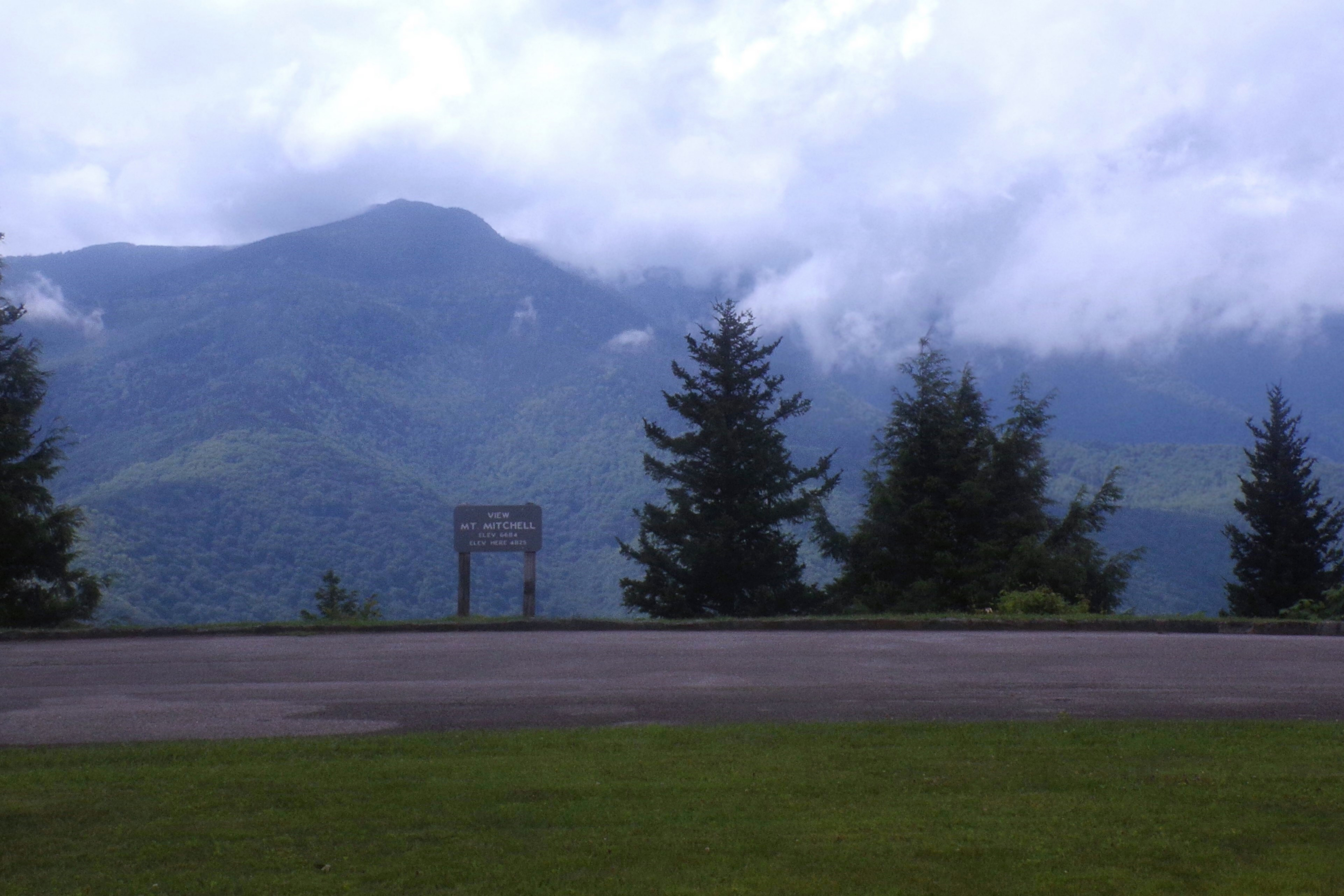
- Mount Mitchell, viewed from the Blue Ridge Parkway in North Carolina

Highest point
- Elevation: 6,684 ft (2,037 m)
- Prominence: 6,089 ft (1,856 m)
- Isolation: 1,189 miles (1,914 km)
- Listing: World most isolated peaks 31st; North America isolated peaks 4th; US most prominent peaks 62nd; U.S. state high points 16th; Ultra
- Coordinates: 35°45′53″N 82°15′54″W

Geography
- Location within North Carolina Location within the United States
- Location: Yancey County, North Carolina, U.S.
- Parent range: Appalachian Mountains
- Topo map: USGS Mount Mitchell

Climbing
- Easiest route: Hike

Mount Mitchell (Attakulla in Cherokee) is the highest peak of the Appalachian Mountains and the highest peak in mainland North America east of the Mississippi River. It is located near Burnsville in Yancey County, North Carolina, in the Black Mountain subrange of the Appalachians about 19 miles (31 km) northeast of Asheville. It is protected by Mount Mitchell State Park and surrounded by the Pisgah National Forest. Mount Mitchell's elevation is 6,684 feet (2,037 m) above sea level. Mount Mitchell is ranked 31st by topographic isolation.

== Geography ==
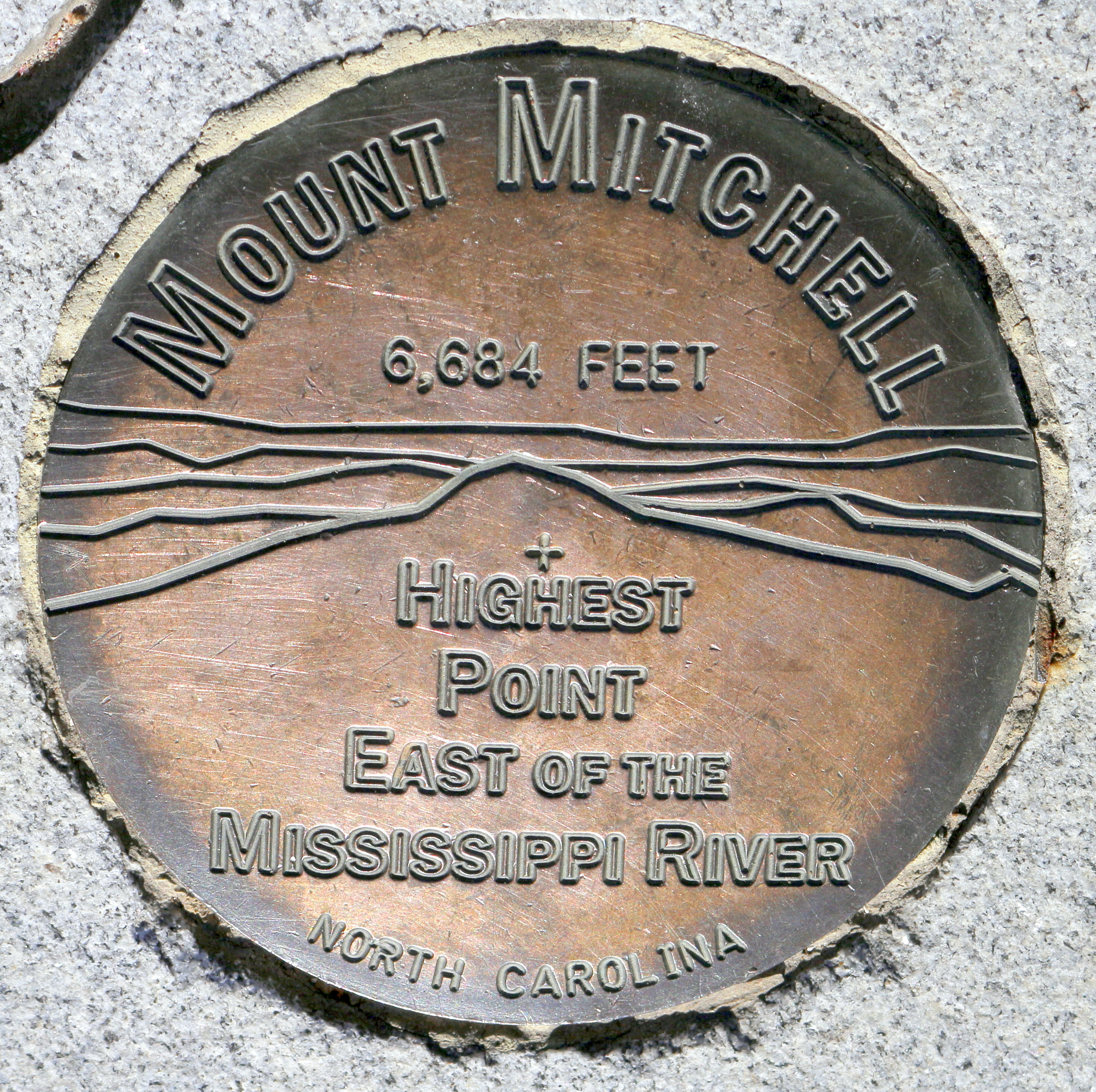
Surveyor's mark embedded in the observation tower notes the elevation of 6684-feet above sea level

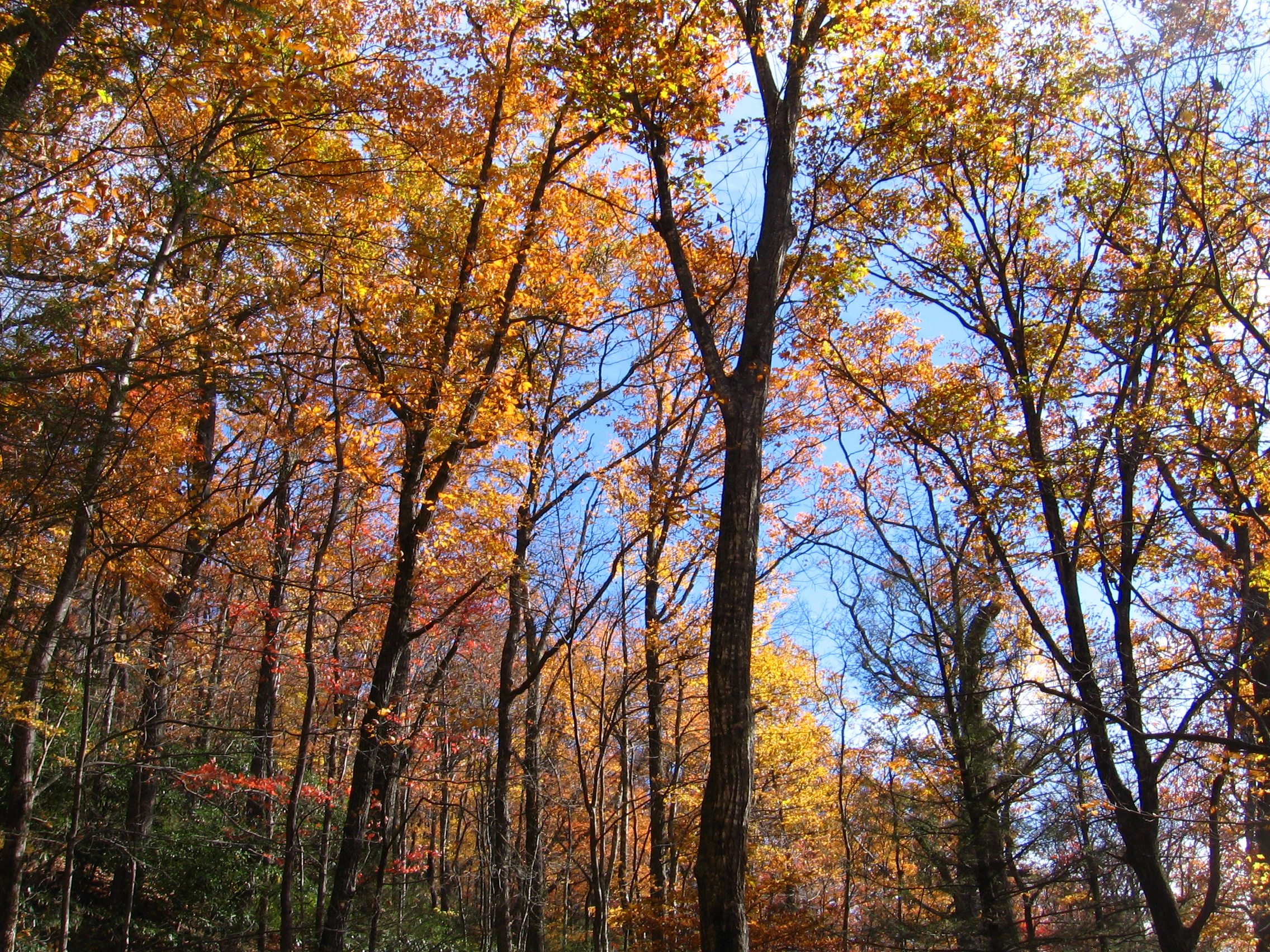
Fall foliage at Mount Mitchell

The peak is the highest mountain in the United States east of the Mississippi River, and the highest in all of eastern North America south of the Arctic Cordillera. Barbeau Peak is higher, but it is located in the very remote Canadian Arctic. The nearest higher peaks are in the Black Hills of South Dakota and the highland foothills of Colorado. The mountain's topographic isolation is calculated from the nearest discernible single higher point: Lone Butte, which is 1,189 miles (1,913 km) away, in southeastern Colorado.

== History ==
Mount Mitchell was the highest mountain of the United States from 1789 until the Louisiana Purchase in 1803 when Mount Elbert became the highest mountain claimed by the United States. Mount Mitchell was also the most isolated peak in the United States from 1789 until the Treaty of Guadalupe Hidalgo in 1848 when Mount Whitney became the most isolated.

The Cherokee people, who long occupied this area as part of their homeland, called the mountain Attakulla. European-American settlers first called the mountain Black Dome for its rounded shape. They later named it after Elisha Mitchell, a professor at the University of North Carolina, who first explored the Black Mountain region in 1835. He determined that the height of the range exceeded by several hundred feet that of Mount Washington in New Hampshire. The latter had been commonly thought at the time to be the highest point in the United States east of the Rocky Mountains. Mitchell fell to his death at nearby Mitchell Falls in 1857, where he had returned to verify his earlier measurements.

A 4.6-mile (7.4 km) road (NC 128) connects the scenic Blue Ridge Parkway to a parking lot where a steep paved 980-foot (300 m) trail leads through a conifer forest to the summit. The 40-foot (12 m) stone observation tower on the summit was torn down in late 2006. A new observation deck was constructed and opened to visitors in January 2009.

== Geologic composition ==
Mount Mitchell was formed during the Precambrian when marine deposits were metamorphosed into gneiss and schist. These metasedimentary rocks were later uplifted during the Alleghenian orogeny. The soils are well drained, dark brown and stony with fine-earth material ranging in texture from sandy clay loam to loam or sandy loam; Burton and Craggey are the most common series around the summit.

Identifying the specific rocks of Mount Mitchell and their relationships with one another helps us understand the mountain's geological history and development. Mount Mitchell is located along the Ashe Metamorphic Suite and is composed largely of metagreywacke rocks. These include, quartzite, marble, amphibolite gneiss and schist, and mica gneiss and schist. In addition to these metamorphic rocks, igneous rocks allow Mount Mitchell to deteriorate at a slower pace. These rocks can endure harsh conditions, resisting erosion, and allowing Mount Mitchell to continue to be the tallest peak in North Carolina. Three orogenies in particular led to the formation of Mount Mitchell, including the Taconic, Acadian, and Alleghanian. These orogenies occurred in sequential order to form the Ashe Metamorphic Suite, inclusive of Mount Mitchell.

Many studies have been done to identify exact temperature and pressure constraints the rocks of Mount Mitchell withstood during formation. One specific study performed by the Environmental Studies Department at the University of Asheville, North Carolina found that the Slant Rock of Mount Mitchell formed in medium to high temperature and pressure ranges. This conclusion was based on the composition of kyanite and sillimanite in the samples that only form under conditions of at least 500 degrees Celsius and 0.4 GPa.

== Environment ==
The mountain's summit is coated in a dense stand of Southern Appalachian spruce-fir forest, which consists primarily of two evergreen species—the red spruce and the Fraser fir. Most of the mature Fraser firs, however, were killed off by the non-native balsam woolly adelgid in the latter half of the 20th century. Additionally, at the beginning of the twentieth century, logging became a common practice and eradicated much of the populations of the red spruce and Fraser fir. Following logging, an intense wildfire arose and transformed the landscape dramatically. The presence of forest fires reconfigured the soil, such that what remained of the red spruce and Fraser fir could not readily repopulate. The high elevations expose plant life to high levels of pollution, including acid precipitation in the form of rain, snow, and fog. These acids damage the red spruce trees in part by releasing natural metals from the soil, such as aluminum, and by leaching important minerals. To what extent this pollution harms the high-altitude ecosystem is debatable.

Despite adverse conditions affecting the populations of these tree species, conservationist groups have emerged to help re-establish in particular, the red spruce. The Southern Appalachian Spruce Restoration Initiative (SASRI) began working directly on Mount Mitchell with Sue Cameron representing their leader. Their plan was to re-establish the red spruce in the Black Mountains, allowing the conifer forest to return to its original density. After investigating maps indicating spruce distribution, Sue Cameron decided that Camp Alice was a favorable site to perform red spruce plantation. The Fish and Wildlife Service was a contributor to this project, and began walking the site, placing flags down where trees could be installed. 327 trees were loaded and transported to the site; thirty-eight people gathered to help plant the trees in the ground. The many volunteers contributing to this effort included twenty-one volunteers originating from the North Carolina High Peaks Trail Association, five volunteers from Warren Wilson College, six volunteers from the Service's Asheville Field Office, five volunteers from North Carolina State Parks, and one volunteer from the North Carolina Wildlife Resources Commission. This effort to restore an integral part of Mount Mitchell's ecosystem required partnership and community assistance to ensure a smooth process.

Red spruce trees have multiple ties within the existing wildlife and ecological community of Mount Mitchell. The Carolina northern flying squirrel is an endangered species that can only be located in high-elevation regions of Southern Appalachia. Red spruce trees provide both shelter for this species in their branches, as well as food for the squirrel in the soil of its roots. Mycorrhizal fungi grow alongside plants such as the red spruce, creating a mutualistic relationship as they both benefit through the reciprocal transfer of nutrients and water. The Carolina northern flying squirrel consumes truffles, which are the fruiting bodies that mycorrhizal fungi produce. This allows for the dispersement of fungal spores. In this way, the presence of red spruce trees allows for a system where species can depend on each other. Additionally, the presence of red spruce benefits two other species currently being protected by the Endangered Species Act. These are the spruce-fir moss spider and the rock gnome lichen. These species depend on high-moisture environments, which these forests, with heavy fog conditions provide. Aiding the growth of these forests, permitting them to become healthier and more interconnected with the environment allows for micro-climate shifts that can counter climate change and create a region that animals can depend upon.

While the mountain is still mostly lush and green in the summer, many dead Fraser fir trunks can be seen due to these serious problems.

Wildflowers are abundant all summer long. Young fir and spruce trees do well in the subalpine climate, and their cones feed the birds along with wild blueberry and blackberry shrubs.

The second highest point in eastern North America, Mount Craig at 6,647 feet (2,026 m), is roughly a mile to the north of Mount Mitchell.

=== Climate ===
Mount Mitchell

Climate chart (precipitation, max. and min. temperature)
J	F	M	A	M	J	J	A	S	O	N	D
6.5 33 17	5.9 35 18	7.1 41 24	5.7 49 31	5.3 57 41	5.7 63 49	5.8 66 52	7.2 65 52	7.5 60 46	5.1 53 37	6.7 45 28	6.2 36 21
- █ Average max. and min. temperatures in °F
- █ Precipitation totals in inches
- Source: NOAA
Metric conversion
J	F	M	A	M	J	J	A	S	O	N	D
166 1 −8	149 2 −8	179 5 −5	145 9 0	135 14 5	146 17 9	148 19 11	182 18 11	190 16 8	129 12 3	170 7 −2	158 2 −6
- █ Average max. and min. temperatures in °C
- █ Precipitation totals in mm

The summit area of Mount Mitchell is marked by a warm-summer humid continental climate (Köppen Dfb), with mild summers and long, moderately cold winters, being more similar to southeastern Canada than the southeastern U.S. The monthly daily average temperature ranges from 25.1 °F (−3.8 °C) in January to 59.6 °F (15.3 °C) in July. The coldest temperature ever recorded in the state occurred there on January 21, 1985, when it fell to −34 °F (−36.7 °C), during a severe cold spell. It is also the coldest average reporting station in the state at 42.9 °F (6.1 °C), well below any other station.

Unlike the lower elevations in the surrounding regions, heavy snows often fall from December to March, with 50 inches (1.27 m) accumulating in the Great Blizzard of 1993 and 33 inches (0.84 m) in the January 2016 blizzard. Due to the high elevation, precipitation is heavy and reliable year-round, averaging 81.09 inches (2,060 mm) for the year, with no month receiving less than 5 in (127 mm) of average precipitation. The summit is often windy, with recorded gusts of up to 178 mph (286 km/h).

Mount Mitchell recorded a new state record of 139.94 inches (3,554.5 mm) of precipitation in 2018, which is also the highest total rainfall recorded during a calendar year anywhere east of the Cascade Range in the Contiguous United States.

Climate data for Mount Mitchell, North Carolina (1991–2020 normals, extremes 1980–present)
Month	Jan	Feb	Mar	Apr	May	Jun	Jul	Aug	Sep	Oct	Nov	Dec	Year
Record high °F (°C)	61 (16)	62 (17)	73 (23)	73 (23)	78 (26)	79 (26)	80 (27)	81 (27)	77 (25)	73 (23)	67 (19)	64 (18)	81 (27)
Mean maximum °F (°C)	51.0 (10.6)	52.3 (11.3)	58.6 (14.8)	66.6 (19.2)	69.6 (20.9)	72.7 (22.6)	74.0 (23.3)	73.3 (22.9)	70.8 (21.6)	66.5 (19.2)	59.0 (15.0)	53.5 (11.9)	75.2 (24.0)
Mean daily maximum °F (°C)	33.5 (0.8)	35.5 (1.9)	41.0 (5.0)	50.2 (10.1)	57.8 (14.3)	63.8 (17.7)	66.8 (19.3)	66.0 (18.9)	61.4 (16.3)	53.6 (12.0)	44.8 (7.1)	37.7 (3.2)	51.0 (10.6)
Daily mean °F (°C)	25.1 (−3.8)	27.0 (−2.8)	32.3 (0.2)	41.1 (5.1)	49.5 (9.7)	56.3 (13.5)	59.6 (15.3)	58.6 (14.8)	53.8 (12.1)	45.2 (7.3)	36.2 (2.3)	29.6 (−1.3)	42.9 (6.1)
Mean daily minimum °F (°C)	16.7 (−8.5)	18.5 (−7.5)	23.6 (−4.7)	32.0 (0.0)	41.3 (5.2)	48.7 (9.3)	52.3 (11.3)	51.2 (10.7)	46.2 (7.9)	36.9 (2.7)	27.6 (−2.4)	21.4 (−5.9)	34.7 (1.5)
Mean minimum °F (°C)	−6.5 (−21.4)	−0.7 (−18.2)	3.9 (−15.6)	14.7 (−9.6)	26.2 (−3.2)	38.9 (3.8)	45.4 (7.4)	45.5 (7.5)	35.2 (1.8)	19.8 (−6.8)	9.2 (−12.7)	1.6 (−16.9)	−9.5 (−23.1)
Record low °F (°C)	−34 (−37)	−23 (−31)	−15 (−26)	1 (−17)	13 (−11)	27 (−3)	36 (2)	32 (0)	23 (−5)	5 (−15)	−19 (−28)	−22 (−30)	−34 (−37)
Average precipitation inches (mm)	7.47 (190)	5.62 (143)	7.22 (183)	6.52 (166)	6.08 (154)	5.46 (139)	6.92 (176)	7.69 (195)	8.76 (223)	6.29 (160)	6.17 (157)	6.89 (175)	81.09 (2,060)
Average snowfall inches (cm)	19.2 (49)	18.6 (47)	18.5 (47)	7.1 (18)	1.4 (3.6)	0.0 (0.0)	0.0 (0.0)	0.0 (0.0)	0.0 (0.0)	0.7 (1.8)	3.9 (9.9)	19.7 (50)	89.1 (226)
Average precipitation days (≥ 0.01 in)	14.1	12.4	14.1	12.6	14.2	16.1	17.8	16.1	12.7	10.3	10.4	13.1	163.9
Average snowy days (≥ 0.1 in)	6.4	6.5	4.9	2.5	0.3	0.0	0.0	0.0	0.0	0.4	2.0	5.2	28.2
Source: NOAA

== Fauna ==
Understanding species diversity in Mount Mitchell is crucial to identify the impacts of environmental changes and better conserve organisms of the area. Leuctra are found in abundance in the Appalachian Mountains of the United States of America. The eastern Nearctic is a region these Leuctra are located, therefore identified as Nearctic Leuctra. Nearctic Leuctra are aquatic organisms; distinguishing each organism part of a species is essential to understanding water quality levels and biodiversity. Using Mount Mitchell as their area of interest, a study was done and published in the Canadian Entomologist Journal where researchers sampled stonefly fauna. Stoneflies are part of the order, Plecoptera, which includes species of the genus Leuctra. Female Leuctra are often difficult to discern or identify by appearance and anatomical traits unlike males. Through genetic sequencing and the creation of phylogenetic trees, they confidently classified groups of males and females into nine species of Leuctra. This then allowed for 235 females to be named.

Another study done by the Department of Biology and Center of Biodiversity Studies at Western Kentucky University sampled the more general stonefly species of Mount Mitchell State Park. Wide scale stonefly diversity is most often found in streams of mountain ranges. These freshwater areas are vulnerable to environmental disturbances such as climate change, pollution, urbanization, and deforestation. Stoneflies are ideal organisms to study when identifying current and future environmental changes. They are highly sensitive to environmental alterations and are normally the first aquatic insects to disperse from an affected habitat. Using an integrated molecular approach and stereo microscopes to examine stonefly, researchers collected 58 species, which added to the prior 140 known species inhabiting the area. Species richness values were estimated to range from 63 to 65.

The Southern Appalachian Mountains are known to be a hotspot for organism biodiversity. An initiative was performed by five separate researchers from several institutions to update the lichen inventory of Mount Mitchell State Park. They discovered and reported 72 lichen taxa for an updated total 243 taxa documented for all time points. Additionally, they rediscovered 13 of the 27 species the 2017 study reported as missing. This updated list contained a surprisingly high level of cyanolichen diversity. Cyanolichen is extremely vulnerable to pollution and disturbance. This finding suggests that the increased level of environmental stressors such as acid rain and hemlock woolly adelgid have a less significant impact on the diversity of Mount Mitchell than previously thought. Additionally, from this research study, five rare lichens were proposed to be conserved at the state level. These include the Alectoria fallacina, Hypotrachyna densirhizinata, Lobarina scrobiculata, Nephroma parile, and Parmelia neodiscrodans.

== See also ==
- Assault on Mount Mitchell, bicycling endurance
- List of mountains in North Carolina
- Mountains-to-Sea Trail
