= National Register of Historic Places listings in Mitchell County, North Carolina =

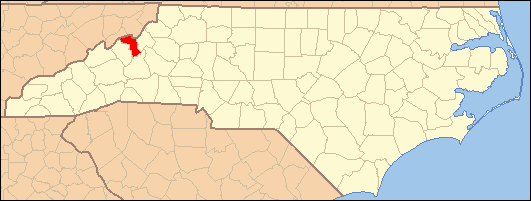

This list includes properties and districts listed on the National Register of Historic Places in Mitchell County, North Carolina. Click the "Map of all coordinates" link to the right to view an online map of all properties and districts with latitude and longitude coordinates in the table below.

== Current listings ==
This National Park Service list is complete through NPS recent listings posted March 14, 2025.

	Name on the Register	Image	Date listed	Location	City or town	Description
1	Blue Ridge Parkway	Blue Ridge Parkway	December 13, 2024 (#100011353)	Blue Ridge Parkway through Virginia and North Carolina; 35°51′04″N 82°05′05″W	Spruce Pine vicinity	
2	Church of the Resurrection	Church of the Resurrection	March 5, 1999 (#99000272)	302 High Ridge Rd. 35°51′03″N 82°05′26″W	Little Switzerland	
3	Dellinger Mill	Dellinger Mill	November 19, 1998 (#98001385)	S side of Cane Creek Rd., just W of jct. with NC 1239; 36°01′01″N 82°05′53″W	Hawk	
4	Downtown Spruce Pine Historic District	Downtown Spruce Pine Historic District	August 28, 2003 (#03000855)	Roughly bounded by Oak Ave., Locust St., Topaz St., and NC 226; 35°54′58″N 82°04′12″W	Spruce Pine	
5	Gunter Building	Gunter Building	March 1, 2002 (#02000112)	288 Oak Ave. 35°54′57″N 82°04′06″W	Spruce Pine	
6	Mitchell County Courthouse	Mitchell County Courthouse	May 10, 1979 (#79001736)	Main St. 36°00′57″N 82°09′30″W	Bakersville	
7	Penland Post Office and General Store	Penland Post Office and General Store	April 16, 2012 (#12000214)	1162 Penland Rd. 35°55′48″N 82°06′50″W	Penland	
8	Penland School Historic District	Penland School Historic District	December 10, 2003 (#03001270)	NC 1164 (Conley Ridge Rd.); 35°56′26″N 82°07′00″W	Penland	
9	John N. Peterson Farm	John N. Peterson Farm	December 6, 1990 (#90001859)	E side of SR 1321 just N of jct. with SR 1322; 36°05′25″N 82°19′48″W	Poplar	
10	Henry Willis House		July 14, 1988 (#88001051)	SR 1164; 35°56′17″N 82°07′47″W	Penland	

== See also ==
- National Register of Historic Places listings in North Carolina
- List of National Historic Landmarks in North Carolina
