= National Register of Historic Places listings in Carter County, Tennessee =

Location of Carter County in Tennessee

This is a list of the National Register of Historic Places listings in Carter County, Tennessee.

This is intended to be a complete list of the properties and districts on the National Register of Historic Places in Carter County, Tennessee, United States. Latitude and longitude coordinates are provided for many National Register properties and districts; these locations may be seen together in a map.

There are 13 properties and districts listed on the National Register in the county, including 1 National Historic Landmark.

See also National Register of Historic Places listings in Washington County, Tennessee for additional properties in Johnson City, a city that spans the county line.

Contents: Counties in Tennessee
Anderson – Bedford – Benton – Bledsoe – Blount – Bradley – Campbell – Cannon – Carroll – Carter – Cheatham – Chester – Claiborne – Clay – Cocke – Coffee – Crockett – Cumberland – Davidson – Decatur – DeKalb – Dickson – Dyer – Fayette – Fentress – Franklin – Gibson – Giles – Grainger – Greene – Grundy – Hamblen – Hamilton – Hancock – Hardeman – Hardin – Hawkins – Haywood – Henderson – Henry – Hickman – Houston – Humphreys – Jackson – Jefferson – Johnson – Knox – Lake – Lauderdale – Lawrence – Lewis – Lincoln – Loudon – Macon – Madison – Marion – Marshall – Maury – McMinn – McNairy – Meigs – Monroe – Montgomery – Moore – Morgan – Obion – Overton – Perry – Pickett – Polk – Putnam – Rhea – Roane – Robertson – Rutherford – Scott – Sequatchie – Sevier – Shelby – Smith – Stewart – Sullivan – Sumner – Tipton – Trousdale – Unicoi – Union – Van Buren – Warren – Washington – Wayne – Weakley – White – Williamson – Wilson

This National Park Service list is complete through NPS recent listings posted March 14, 2025.

== Current listings ==
	Name on the Register	Image	Date listed	Location	City or town	Description
1	Rueben Brooks Farmstead	Rueben Brooks Farmstead	April 5, 2001 (#01000344)	1548 Blue Springs Rd. 36°23′46″N 82°06′25″W	Elizabethton	Farm established c. 1820, house constructed during the same period.
2	John and Landon Carter House	John and Landon Carter House	April 14, 1972 (#72001230)	1013 Broad St. 36°21′14″N 82°12′17″W	Elizabethton	
3	Elizabethton Historic District	Elizabethton Historic District	March 14, 1973 (#73001754)	Bounded roughly by 2nd, 4th, East, and Sycamore Sts. 36°20′52″N 82°12′41″W	Elizabethton	
4	Henson Hunt House	Henson Hunt House	December 26, 1979 (#79002414)	Brookdale Rd. 36°17′56″N 82°19′25″W	Johnson City	
5	Miller Farmstead	Miller Farmstead	July 25, 2014 (#14000449)	Roan Mountain State Park; 36°10′41″N 82°06′38″W	Roan Mountain	
6	Renfro-Allen Farm		March 28, 1996 (#96000333)	Judge Ben Allen Rd., northeast of Elizabethton; 36°22′37″N 82°10′48″W	Elizabethton	
7	Sabine Hill	Sabine Hill	April 11, 1973 (#73001755)	Off State Route 67; 36°19′33″N 82°16′11″W	Elizabethton	
8	Shelving Rock Encampment	Shelving Rock Encampment	July 10, 2009 (#09000533)	State Route 143 and Smith Branch Rd. 36°11′00″N 82°04′32″W	Roan Mountain	Site where the Overmountain Men camped in September 1780 while en route to the Battle of Kings Mountain.
9	Simerly-Butler House	Simerly-Butler House	November 7, 1996 (#96001315)	206 Main St. 36°17′00″N 82°10′24″W	Hampton	Now known as Butler Mansion; built in 1867 by local businessman and politician Elijah Simerly; later occupied by Ralph Butler.
10	Sycamore Shoals	Sycamore Shoals	October 15, 1966 (#66000721)	2 miles (3.2 km) west of Elizabethton on the Watauga River; 36°20′33″N 82°15′21″W	Elizabethton	
11	U.S. Post Office	U.S. Post Office	August 9, 1983 (#83003024)	201-203 N. Sycamore St. 36°20′56″N 82°12′54″W	Elizabethton	Early-1930s beaux-arts building designed by James Wetmore; now home to the Elizabethton-Carter County Public Library.
12	Watauga Hydroelectric Project	Watauga Hydroelectric Project	August 11, 2017 (#100001463)	774 Wilbur Dam Rd. 36°19′24″N 82°07′19″W	Elizabethton	
13	John T. Wilder House	John T. Wilder House	March 13, 1986 (#86000400)	202 Main St. 36°11′45″N 82°04′16″W	Roan Mountain	Built in 1884 by General John T. Wilder.

== Former listings ==
	Name on the Register	Image	Date listed	Date removed	Location	City or town	Description
1	Carriger-Cowan House		June 6, 1979 (#79002415)	March 27, 2013	East of Siam	Siam	
2	Henry Range House		March 25, 1982 (#82003956)	April 12, 1991	South of Watauga on Smallings Rd.	Watauga	Relocated to the property of the Isaac Hammer House in Washington County.

== See also ==
- List of National Historic Landmarks in Tennessee
- National Register of Historic Places listings in Tennessee
