= Roan Mountain =

Roan Mountain can refer to:

- Roan Mountain (Roan Highlands), a mountain on the border between Tennessee and North Carolina
- Roan Mountain, Tennessee, a small town in northeastern Tennessee near the base of Roan Mountain
- Roan Mountain State Park, a state park in northeastern Tennessee, covering Roan Mountain's northern slope and immediate base
