= North Carolina Highway 261 =

State highway in Mitchell County, North Carolina, US

North Carolina Highway 261

Route information
- Maintained by NCDOT
- Length: 12.8 mi (20.6 km)
- Existed: 1952–present

Major junctions
- South end: NC 226 in Bakersville
- North end: SR 143 at the Tennessee state line near Roan Mountain, TN

Location
- Country: United States
- State: North Carolina
- Counties: Mitchell

Highway system
- North Carolina Highway System; Interstate; US; State; Scenic
← US 258	→ US 264

North Carolina Highway 261 (NC 261) is a short state highway going from Bakersville to the Tennessee state line where the road turns into Tennessee State Route 143 (SR 143). The road is only 12.8 miles (20.6 km) long and is very curvy. The road is close to Roan Mountain State Park in Tennessee.

== Route description ==
NC 261 begins in the town of Bakersville, the county seat of Mitchell County, at a stop-controlled T-intersection with NC 226 (Crimson Laurel Way). It immediately climbs a short hill out of the town and into the Pisgah National Forest. As it starts to head in a northeastern general direction, NC 261 begins a winding course between the Cub Creek and Pumpkin Patch Mountain. After crossing Pumpkin Patch Gap (elevation approximately 3,140 feet (960 m)), the road begins to follow the Little Rock Creek and pass through the communities of Cookstown and Glen Ayre. three miles (4.8 km) outside of Glen Ayre, after paralleling more streams, NC 261 starts a climb up to Roan Mountain. Afters some hairpin turns, the road reaches Carvers Gap (elevation 5,500 feet (1,680 m)) where the state line and Appalachian Trail crosses the road. Tennessee SR 143 continues ahead towards the community of Roan Mountain.

== History ==
What became NC 261 was an unnumbered gravel and dirt road between Bakersville and Carvers Gap. Between 1949 and 1953, the state took over the road and paved it with asphalt. The routing has not changed since its original designation.

== Junction list ==
The entire route is in Mitchell County.

Location	mi	km	Destinations	Notes
Bakersville	0.0	0.0	NC 226 (Crimson Laurel Way)	
	12.8	20.6	SR 143 north – Roan Mountain	Tennessee state line
1.000 mi = 1.609 km; 1.000 km = 0.621 mi
