= Wilder House =

Wilder House may refer to:

- Wilder House (Prescott, Arizona), listed on the National Register of Historic Places (NRHP) in Yavapai County, Arizona
- Wilder House (Chatham, Louisiana), listed on the NRHP in Jackson Parish, Louisiana
- Wilder House (Ruston, Louisiana), listed on the NRHP in Lincoln Parish, Louisiana
- The Wilder Homestead, Buckland, Massachusetts, listed on the NRHP in Franklin County, Massachusetts
- General John T. Wilder House, a home of John T. Wilder in Knoxville, Tennessee
- John T. Wilder House, a home of John T. Wilder in Roan Mountain, Tennessee
