= Tennessee State Route 143 =

Highway in Tennessee

State Route 143
- Roan Road
- SR 143 highlighted in red

Route information
- Maintained by TDOT
- Length: 12.46 mi (20.05 km)

Major junctions
- South end: NC 261 at the North Carolina state line near Roan Mountain State Park
- North end: US 19E in Roan Mountain

Location
- Country: United States
- State: Tennessee
- Counties: Carter

Highway system
- Tennessee State Routes; Interstate; US; State
← SR 142	→ SR 144

State Route 143 (SR 143) is a 12.46-mile-long (20.05 km) state highway that goes through the Cherokee National Forest and Roan Mountain State Park in northeastern Tennessee. The road is very curvy as it does go through a mountainous area. Its northern terminus is U.S. Route 19E (US 19E) in the town of Roan Mountain and its southern terminus is North Carolina Highway 261 (NC 261).

== Route description ==
SR 143 begins at the top of Roan Mountain on the North Carolina border, where it continues south as North Carolina Highway 261 (NC 261). It goes north through some switchback curves and mountainous terrain before straightening out and leaving the mountains to pass through some farmland and Roan Mountain State Park. SR 143 then enters the town of Roan Mountain and intersects with its former alignment through town before bypassing downtown to the west before coming to an end at an intersection with US 19E/SR 37.

== Junction list ==
The entire route is in Carter County.

Location	mi	km	Destinations	Notes
Carver's Gap	0.0	0.0	NC 261 – Bakersville	Southern terminus; North Carolina state line
Roan Mountain	11.9	19.2	Old Highway 143 – Downtown Roan Mountain	
Roan Mountain	12.46	20.05	US 19E (SR 37) – Elizabethton, Elk Park, NC	Northern terminus
1.000 mi = 1.609 km; 1.000 km = 0.621 mi
