= Mars Hill terrane =

The Mars Hill terrane (MHT) is a belt of rocks exposed in the southern Appalachian Mountains, between Roan Mountain, North Carolina and Mars Hill, North Carolina. The terrane is located at the junction between the Western Blue Ridge and the Eastern Blue Ridge Mountains.

The unique lithology., age, and metamorphic history of the MHT suggest an exotic terrane origin, unrelated to either the Laurentian or peri-Gondwanan terranes that make up most of the Appalachian Mountains. Whole-rock Rb-Sr dating suggests an age of 1.8 Ga for the MHT, making it the oldest terrane in the southern Appalachians by 600 million years.

== Characteristics ==
The main outcrops of the Mars Hill terrane occur in far western North Carolina, between Mars Hill and Roan Mountain. There are additional associated Mesoproterozoic outcrops that may also be a part of the terrane.

The MHT is unique in the southern Appalachians, for several reasons:

1. Lithology. The MHT comprises a more diverse set of rocks than any other basement exposure in the southern Appalachians, including mafics/ultramafics interspersed with granitic gneisses. In contrast:
  - The Western Blue Ridge show no mafics/ultramafics at all. These metasedimentary rocks were likely originally deposited as sedimentary sequences on the margin of Laurentia before the various terrane accretions starting forcing up the Appalachians
  - The Eastern Blue Ridge Mountains do show some mafic rocks, but always in contact with metasedimentary rocks. This is likely because the Eastern Blue Ridge comprises island arc(s) and their accompanying sedimentary sequences that docked onto Laurentia during the Phanerozoic. Additionally, the Eastern Blue Ridge mafics are rarely migmatitic; the MHT mafics are often migmatitic.
2. Metamorphic Grade. The MHT has been metamorphosed to granulite facies. In contrast, Western and Eastern Blue Ridge rocks rarely experienced metamorphism above amphibolite facies.
3. Age. Whole-rock Rb-Sr dating suggests crystallization from magma at 1.8 Ga. This is significantly earlier than most Western/Eastern Blue Ridge rocks, which are consistently age-dated at less than 750 Ma.

In terms of lithology, age, and metamorphic history, the MHT appears to be related to Paleoproterozoic terranes in the Great Lakes region of the U.S. and Canada.

== Origins and evolution ==
- 1.8 Ga - Crystallization from magma. Whole-rock Rb-Sr dating suggests that initial protolith crystallization occurred near 1.8 Ga. The original tectonic environment is now difficult to discern, because these rocks have been metamorphosed repeatedly since their original crystallization. However, it is likely that they formed as igneous rocks in a subduction-related island arc system. Subsequent or co-eval sedimentation added clastic deposits to the terrane. Where this happened is uncertain. It's possible that the terrane formed as a portion of Laurentia, then rifted off and was re-attached during a subsequent orogeny. Alternatively, it may have formed adjacent to a different Paleoproterozoic landmass (e.g., West Africa or Amazonia), then rifted off and collided with Laurentia.
- 1.2 Ga - Metamorphic and magmatic event. Zircon analysis suggests that the MHT underwent a metamorphic event near 1.2 Ga, possibly related to the Grenville Orogeny that assembled the supercontinent Rodinia. This event brought the MHT rocks up to granulite facies. The event likely also emplaced large volumes of felsic and mafic igneous rocks in the MHT.
- 730 Ma - Magmatic event. The MHT was intruded again by mafic magmas approximately 730 Ma, possibly as a result of Rodinia rifting.
- 470 Ma - Metamorphic event, likely the Taconic Orogeny.

== Mapping ==
The Mars Hill terrane comprises several units, variously named:

- Pumpkin Patch Metamorphic Suite / Fries Thrust Sheet - Northern high metamorphic grade portion of Mars Hill terrane. (Goldberg et al., 1989; Adams et al., 1995; Stewart et al., 1997; Trupe et al., 2001)
- Cullowhee terrane - Previous name for portion of MHT
- Amphibolitic Basement Complex - Previous name for portion of MHT
