= Ellen Weiske =

American goldsmith (born 1958)

Ellen M. Wieske (born 1958) is an American artist, metalsmith, goldsmith, curator, educator, author, and an arts administrator. She is the deputy director of the Haystack Mountain School of Crafts. Wieske is known for her wirework pieces.

== Biography ==
Ellen Wieske was born in Detroit, Michigan where she continued to live and attend college at Wayne State University. There, she received a BA (Bachelor of Arts), and then a MFA (Master of Fine Arts) from Cranbrook Academy of Art, located in Bloomfield, Michigan. Weiske then went on to teach and work as a metalsmith for over 23 years. She is a member of Society of North American Goldsmiths (SNAG) and resided as a member on the Board of Directors in 2005 and 2006.

Although her career as a student remained in Michigan, Weiske has taught at various colleges and universities all over the United States, including Penland School of Crafts in Penland, North Carolina; Arrowmont School of Arts and Crafts in Gatlinburg, Tennessee; and Haystack Mountain School of Crafts in Deer Isle, Maine. She has also taught in Provence, France for four summers.

== Work ==
Weiske works at Dow Studio in Deer Isle, Maine where she teaches and continues to expand on her multi-media body of work. Her art work has been exhibited nationally as well as internationally.

Her work is in public museum collections, included in the Farnsworth Art Museum.

== Bibliography ==
- Weiske, Ellen (2001). Weekend Crafter. Lark Books. ISBN 1-57990-190-5..
