= Cloudland (disambiguation) =

Cloudland is a former entertainment venue in Brisbane, Australia.

Cloudland may also refer to:

- Cloudland (adventure), a fantasy role-playing game adventure
- Cloudland (album), by Pere Ubu, 1989
- Cloudland, Georgia, an unincorporated community in western Chattooga County
- Cloudland High School, a public high school in Roan Mountain, Tennessee

== Other uses ==
- Cloudland Canyon State Park, a state park in Georgia, U.S.A.
- Cloudland Canyon (band), an American psychedelic rock band
