= John T. Wilder House =

Historic house in Tennessee, United States

- U.S. National Register of Historic Places
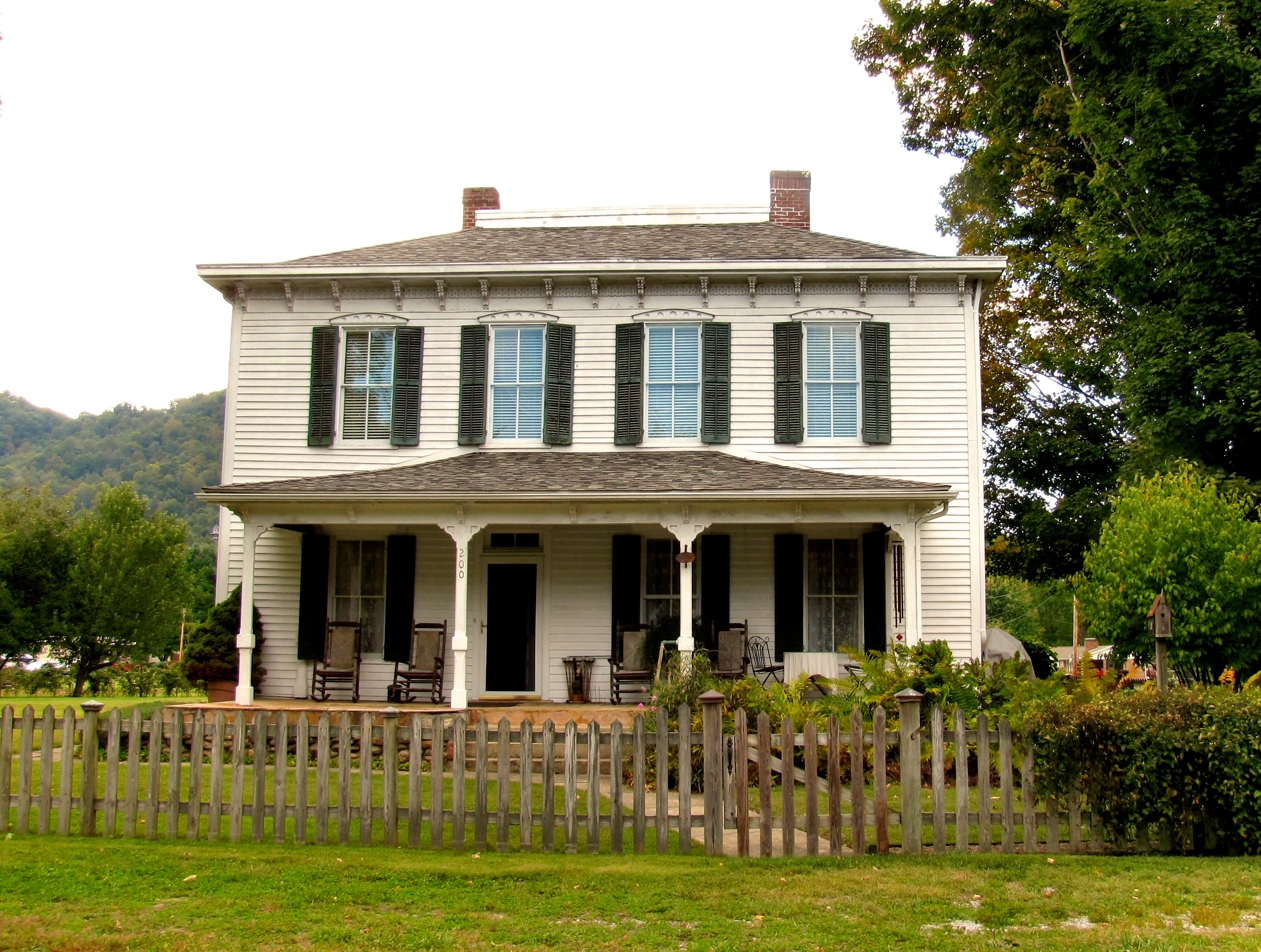
- The home in 2015

- Location within Tennessee Location within the United States
- Location: 202 Main St., Roan Mountain, Tennessee
- Coordinates: 36°11′45″N 82°4′16″W
- Area: less than one acre
- Built: 1884
- Architectural style: Italianate
- NRHP reference No.: 86000400
- Added to NRHP: March 13, 1986

John Thomas Wilder built several houses for his family and wife, Martha Jane Stewart, which are still in existence, and at least two have historic markers.

The John T. Wilder House in Roan Mountain, Tennessee, United States, was one of the homes of John T. Wilder, the Union Army general and industrialist who built the Cloudland Hotel on Roan Mountain. The house was listed on the National Register of Historic Places in 1986. It is one of two homes on Main Street in Roan Mountain that Wilder built.

The General John T. Wilder House in Knoxville is another of Wilder's homes that is listed on the National Register.

Another house is located in Greensburg, Indiana. See https://www.in.gov/history/markers/414.htm.
