= Bakersville, North Carolina =

- Town
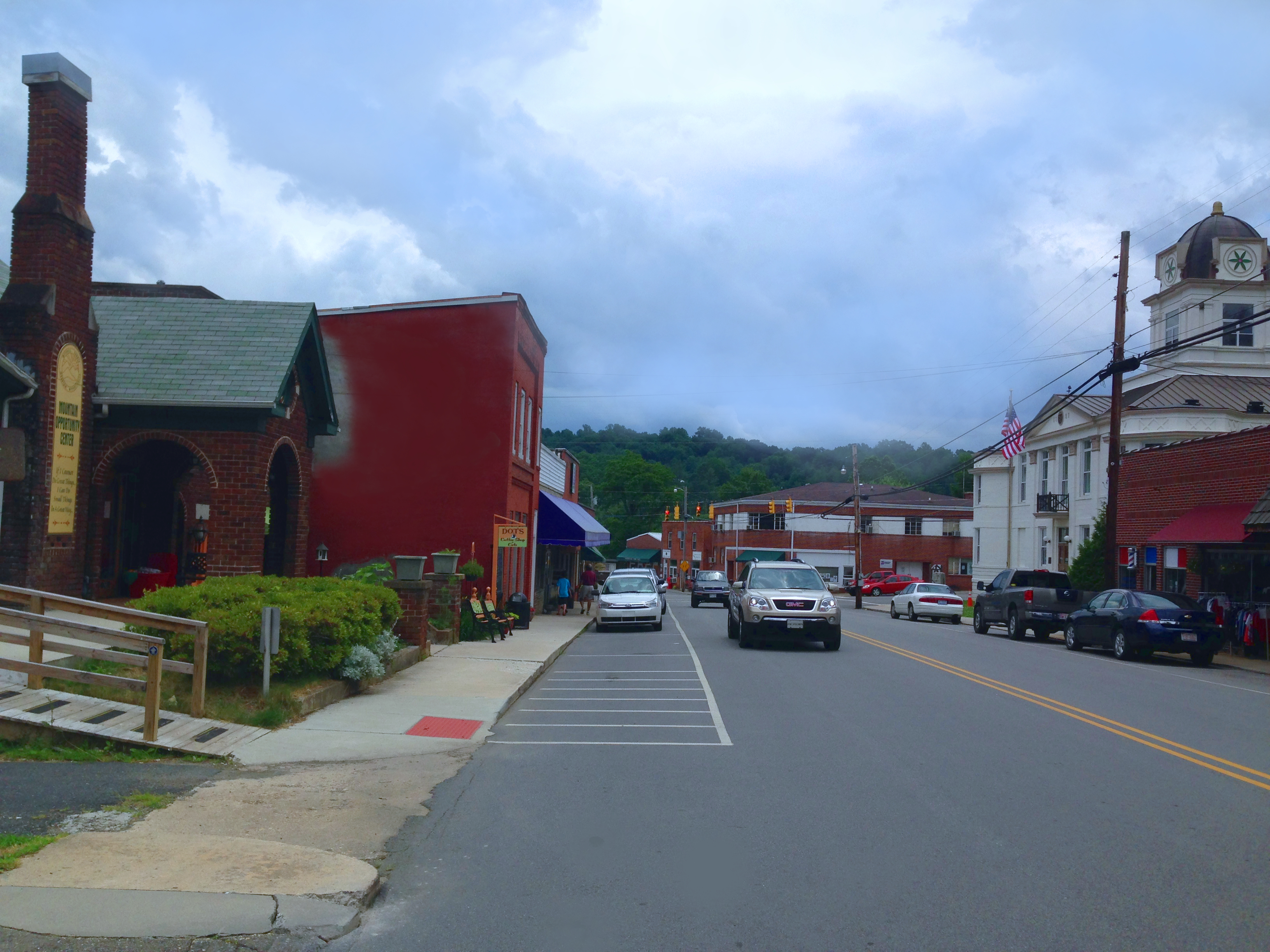
- North Mitchell Ave in downtown Bakersville

- Seal
- Motto: "Gateway to the Roan, Home to the Arts"
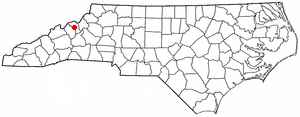
- Location in North Carolina
- Coordinates: 36°00′55″N 82°09′30″W
- Country: United States
- State: North Carolina
- County: Mitchell
- Incorporated: 1868
- Named for: David Baker

Area
  - Total: 0.76 sq mi (1.97 km^{2})
  - Land: 0.76 sq mi (1.97 km^{2})
  - Water: 0 sq mi (0.00 km^{2})
- Elevation: 2,464 ft (751 m)

Population (2020)
  - Total: 450
  - Density: 592.0/sq mi (228.58/km^{2})
- Time zone: UTC-5 (Eastern (EST))
  - Summer (DST): UTC-4 (EDT)
- ZIP Code: 28705
- Area code: 828
- FIPS code: 37-03100
- GNIS feature ID: 2405201
- Website: www.bakersvillenc.com

Bakersville is a town in Mitchell County, North Carolina, United States. The population was 450 at the 2020 census. It is the county seat of Mitchell County.

== History ==
In prehistoric times, local mica deposits were extensively mined by Native Americans. The first Euro-American settlers arrived in the area after the American Revolution, establishing scattered homesteads. The town of Bakersville dates from the 1850s and was named for David Baker, a Revolutionary War soldier and one of the first to live in the area around 1790 and described as "a large land owner, innkeeper, merchant and political leader until his death in 1838. Some of David's sons and daughters remained and were equally influential in the area for many years after David's death." Situated on the main route leading over Roan Mountain and westward into Tennessee, the town developed slowly. Traveler Frederick Law Olmsted passed through Bakersville in the early 1850s and noted that the "town" consisted of only a couple of cabins within a quarter-mile radius. In 1861, a post office was established and named "Davis" after Jefferson Davis. Following the Civil War, the county seat of newly created Mitchell County was relocated to the town that had been renamed Bakersville by the Republican state government, leading to the construction of a courthouse and a growth in population. In the 1870s, as mica became commercially valuable, the rich local deposits of the mineral caused a temporary economic boom. Bakersville is also home to the North Carolina Rhododendron Festival. The pageant attracts visitors from across the state and nation, most notably Richard Nixon in 1958.

Historian and sociologist James W. Loewen has identified Bakersville as one of several possible sundown towns in North Carolina.

The Mitchell County Courthouse was added to the National Register of Historic Places in 1979.

== Geography ==
Bakersville is in central Mitchell County, in the valley of Cane Creek, sitting at an elevation of 2,471 feet (753 m) above sea level. Pumpkin Patch Mountain (4,098 feet [1,249 m]) and Meadlock Mountain (3,895 feet [1,187 m]) rise above the town to the north, and Roan Mountain rises to 6,283 feet (1,915 m) beyond them, 6 miles (10 km) north of the town.

North Carolina Highway 226 runs through the center of Bakersville, leading southeast 11 miles (18 km) to Spruce Pine, the largest town in Mitchell County, and west, then north 15 miles (24 km) to the Tennessee border at Iron Mountain Gap. North Carolina Highway 261 starts in Bakersville and leads north 12 miles (19 km) to the crest of Roan Mountain at Carvers Gap on the Tennessee border.

According to the U.S. Census Bureau, the town of Bakersville has a total area of 0.8 square miles (2.1 km^{2}), all land. Cane Creek, running through the center of town, is a west-flowing tributary of the North Toe River, one of the headwaters of the Nolichucky River which flows west into Tennessee.

== Education ==
Bakersville has one public primary and used to have a middle school, with approximately two hundred students.

== Demographics ==
Historical population
Census	Pop.	Note	%±
1900	511		—
1910	416		−18.6%
1920	332		−20.2%
1930	426		28.3%
1940	437		2.6%
1950	428		−2.1%
1960	393		−8.2%
1970	409		4.1%
1980	373		−8.8%
1990	332		−11.0%
2000	357		7.5%
2010	464		30.0%
2020	450		−3.0%
U.S. Decennial Census

As of the census of 2000, there were 357 people, 168 households, and 97 families residing in the town. The population density was 474.4 inhabitants per square mile (183.2/km^{2}). There were 206 housing units at an average density of 273.8 per square mile (105.7/km^{2}). The racial makeup of the town was 99.72% White and 0.28% Native American. Hispanic or Latino of any race were 0.28% of the population.

There were 168 households, out of which 20.2% had children under the age of 18 living with them, 45.2% were married couples living together, 12.5% had a female householder with no husband present, and 41.7% were non-families. 39.3% of all households were made up of individuals, and 22.6% had someone living alone who was 65 years of age or older. The average household size was 2.04 and the average family size was 2.72.

In the town, the population was spread out, with 19.3% under the age of 18, 8.1% from 18 to 24, 20.4% from 25 to 44, 26.1% from 45 to 64, and 26.1% who were 65 years of age or older. The median age was 46 years. For every 100 females, there were 77.6 males. For every 100 females age 18 and over, there were 76.7 males.

The median income for a household in the town was $19,286, and the median income for a family was $31,563. Males had a median income of $27,500 versus $22,083 for females. The per capita income for the town was $15,997. About 15.2% of families and 18.2% of the population were below the poverty line, including 16.9% of those under age 18 and 23.7% of those age 65 or over.

== Educational facilities ==
Bakersville is home to Gouge Primary School (K–2), Former Bowman Middle School (5–8), Mitchell Middle School (3–8) and Mitchell High School (9–12).

The Mitchell County Library, a branch of the Avery-Mitchell-Yancey Regional Library, is located at 18 North Mitchell Avenue.

== Notable people ==
- William Bowman, stage and film actor, writer, and director
- Del McCoury, bluegrass musician
- Ella St. Clair Thompson, suffragist, attorney and business owner
- Red Wilson, bluegrass musician
- Waddell Wilson, former crew chief and engine builder in NASCAR
- Ralph Yelton, served in the Tennessee House of Representatives from 1977 to 1989

== See also ==
- Roan Mountain, Tennessee
- Roan Mountain State Park
