= Penland Post Office and General Store =

- U.S. National Register of Historic Places
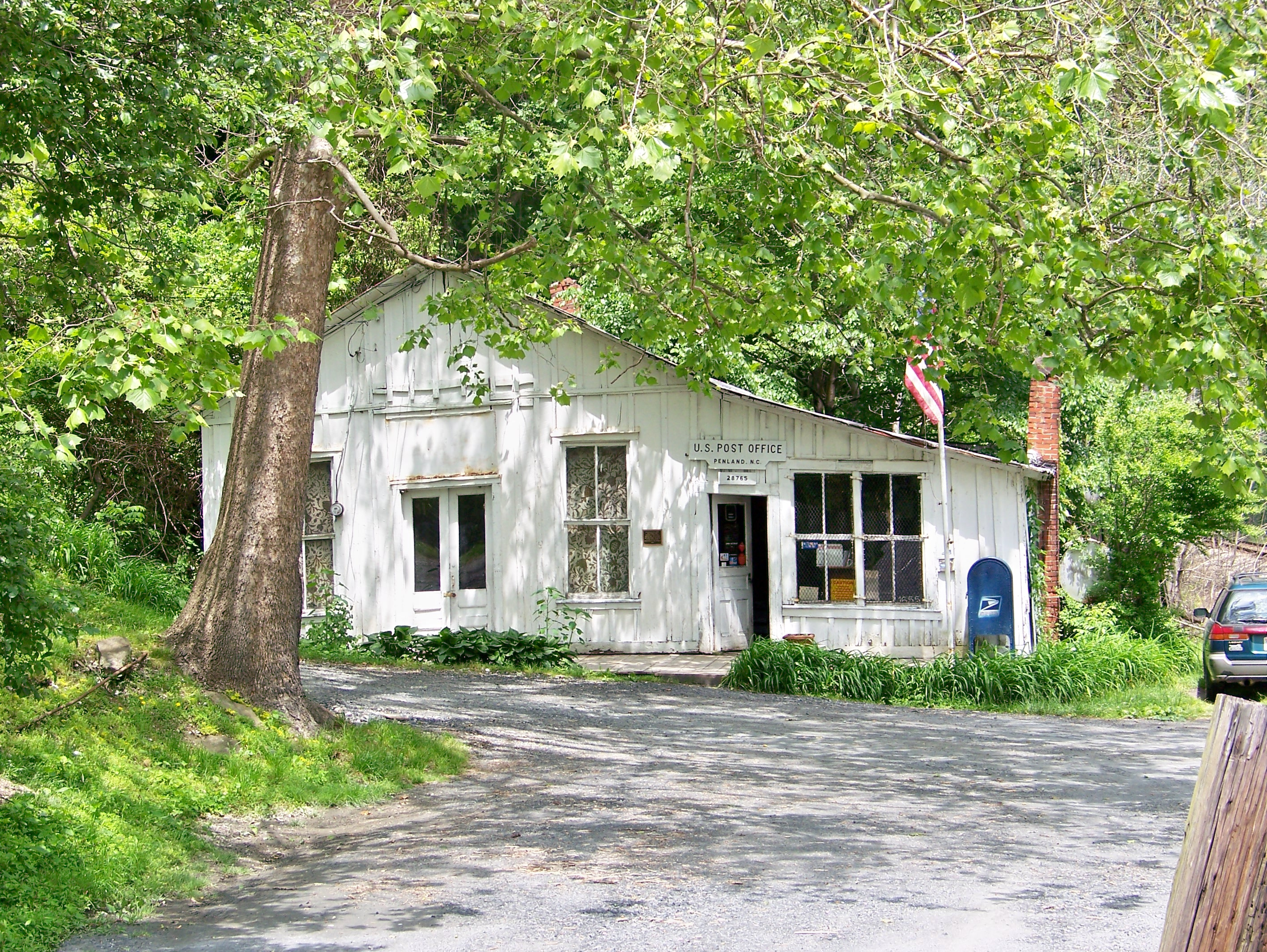

- Location within North Carolina Location within the United States
- Location: 1162 Penland Rd., Penland, North Carolina
- Coordinates: 35°55′48″N 82°06′50″W
- Area: 0.12 acres (0.049 ha)
- Built: c. 1900, 1934
- NRHP reference No.: 12000214
- Added to NRHP: April 16, 2012

Penland Post Office and General Store, also known as Bailey Lumber Company Office Building and Bailey Lumber Company Office and General Merchandise Store, is a historic post office and general store located at Penland, Mitchell County, North Carolina. It was built about 1879, and is a long, one-story, frame building with a front-gable roof and rough-sawn board and batten siding. The building housed the office and store of the Bailey Lumber Company from about 1900 to 1916, and a general store from about 1902 to 1974. It has housed the Penland post office since 1934 and is the oldest active post office facility in Mitchell County and is the county's last remaining Fourth Class post office.

It was added to the National Register of Historic Places in 2012.
