= Mitchell High School (North Carolina) =

American public school in North Carolina

Location
- 416 Ledger School Rd; Bakersville, North Carolina 28705; United States
- Coordinates: 35°58′13″N 82°7′3″W

Information
- Type: Public
- Established: 1978 (48 years ago)
- School district: Mitchell County Schools
- CEEB code: 340220
- Principal: Cole Chester
- Staff: 42.45 (FTE)
- Grades: 9–12
- Enrollment: 508 (2023–2024)
- Student to teacher ratio: 11.97
- Colors: Purple and white
- Athletics: Football, Baseball, Basketball, Cheerleading, Cross Country, Soccer, Volleyball, Track and Field, Wrestling, Softball, and Golf
- Team name: Mountaineers
- Website: www.mcsnc.org/o/mhs

Mitchell High School is a high school in western North Carolina located in Mitchell County, North Carolina. Their mascot is the Mountaineers, and the school colors are purple and white.

== History ==
Mitchell High School opened in 1978 as the result of consolidation of all high schools in Mitchell County. It was built in the small unincorporated community of Ledger between the only two municipalities of Mitchell County, Spruce Pine, North Carolina and Bakersville, North Carolina. For some students in the more remote areas of the county such as Pigeonroost and Poplar, a school bus ride of over an hour is not uncommon.

In 2014, the Mitchell High School Show Choir won the state title.

Mitchell High School is accredited by both the North Carolina State Department of Public Instruction and Southern Association of Schools.

== Athletics ==
Mitchell High School has won the following North Carolina High School Athletic Association (NCHSAA) team state championships:

- Girls Basketball: 1996 (2A), 2003 (2A)
- Boys Golf: 2023 (1A), 2024 (1A)
- Wrestling Dual Team: 2014 (1A), 2015 (1A)
- Wrestling State Tournament Team: 1988 (1A/2A), 1990 (1A/2A), 2015 (1A)
