= Dellinger Mill =

- U.S. National Register of Historic Places
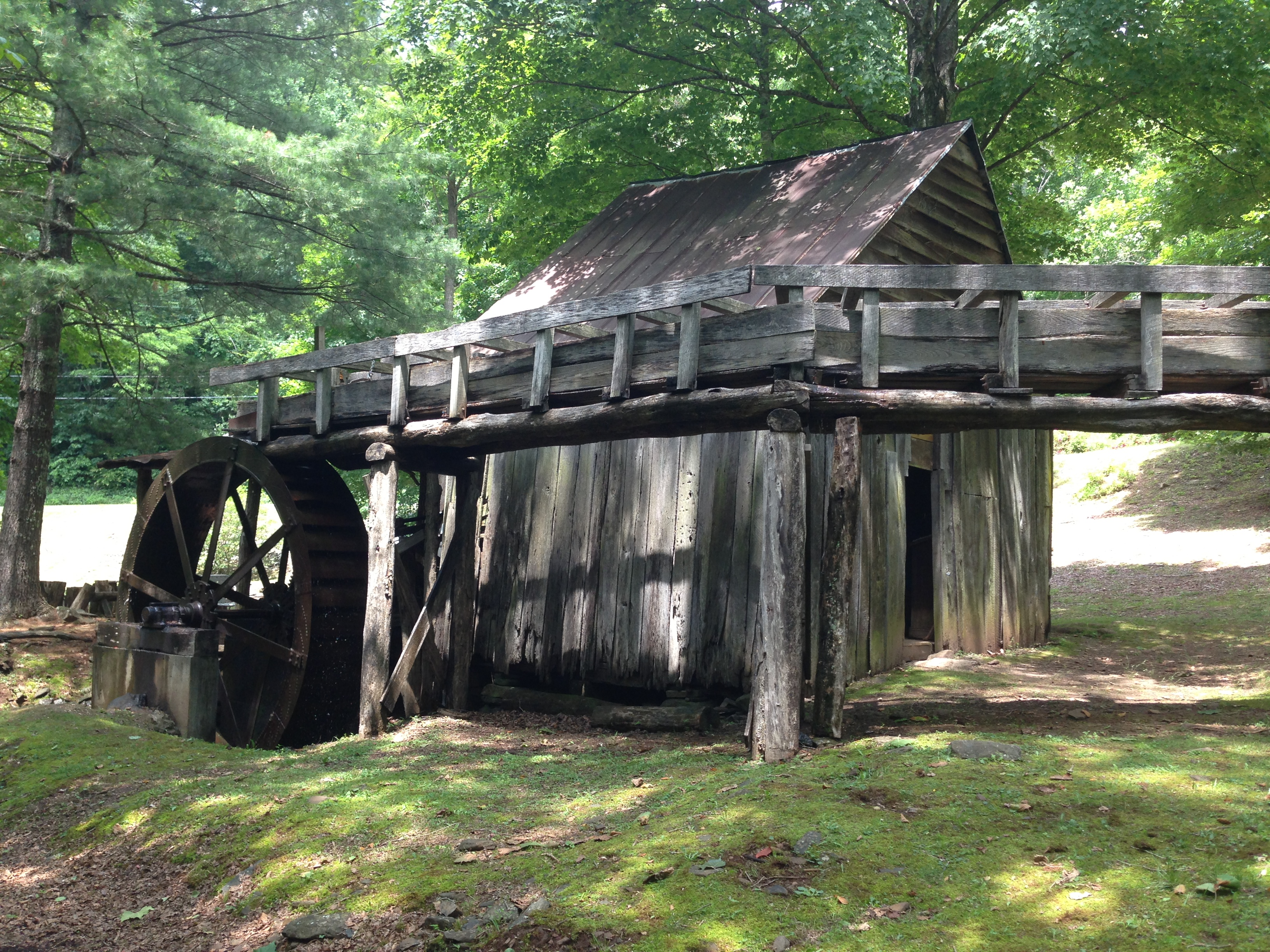
- Dellinger Mill, June 2013

- Location within North Carolina Location within the United States
- Location: S side of Cane Creek Rd., just W of jct. with NC 1239, near Hawk, North Carolina
- Coordinates: 36°1′1″N 82°5′53″W
- Area: 3.6 acres (1.5 ha)
- Built: c. 1901-1903
- NRHP reference No.: 98001385
- Added to NRHP: November 19, 1998

Dellinger Mill is a historic grist mill located near Hawk, Mitchell County, North Carolina. It was built about 1901–1903, and is a small unpainted rectangular frame building. It measures 18 feet by 14 feet, 6 inches, and is sheathed in chestnut boards and weatherboard. It has a 23 feet in diameter water wheel that was rebuilt in the 1940s. Other contributing resources are an apple house (c. 1901–1903) and the mill site. The mill operated until 1955 and was restored after 1997. It is the last water powered/stone ground grist mill of its kind left in the state of North Carolina.

It was added to the National Register of Historic Places in 1998.
