= Henry Willis House =

Historic house in North Carolina, United States

- U.S. National Register of Historic Places
- Location within North Carolina Location within the United States
- Location: SR 1164, near Penland, North Carolina
- Coordinates: 35°56′17″N 82°07′47″W
- Area: 18 acres (7.3 ha)
- Built: c. 1880, c. 1890
- Architectural style: Double-pen log house
- NRHP reference No.: 88001051
- Added to NRHP: July 14, 1988

Henry Willis House, also known as Ehle House, is a historic home located near Penland, Mitchell County, North Carolina. It was built about 1880, and enlarged about 1890. It is a double-pen log house, with a weatherboarded log ell added after the turn of the 20th century. It was enlarged again about 1930 and in the 1980s. Also on the property is a contributing privy. It is one of the three traditional log homesteads in Mitchell County.

It was added to the National Register of Historic Places in 1988.
