= Mitchell County Courthouse (North Carolina) =

- U.S. National Register of Historic Places
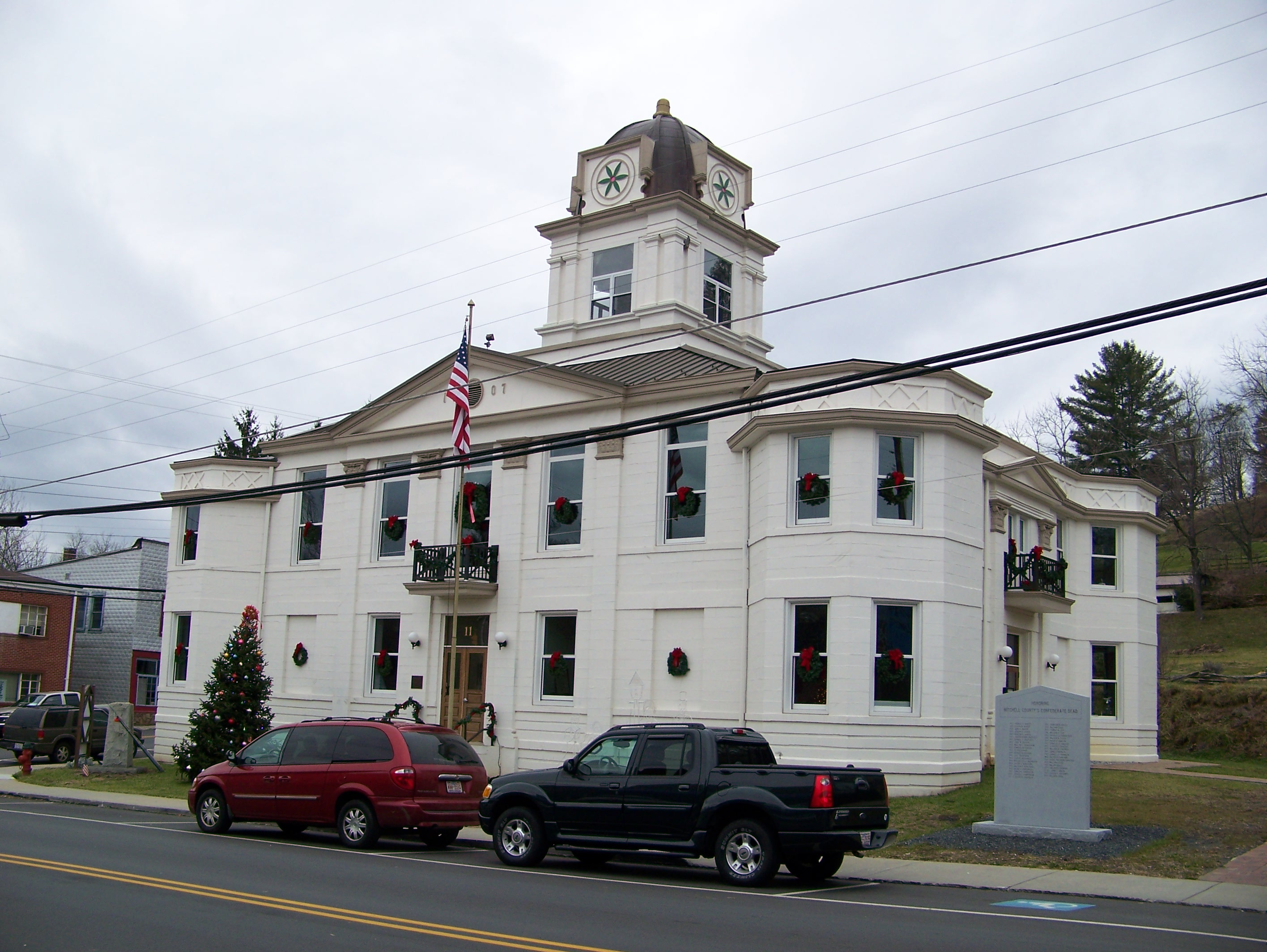

- Location within North Carolina Location within the United States
- Location: 11 N Mitchell Ave., Bakersville, North Carolina
- Coordinates: 36°0′57″N 82°9′30″W
- Area: less than one acre
- Built: 1907-1908
- Architectural style: Classical Revival
- MPS: North Carolina County Courthouses TR
- NRHP reference No.: 79001736
- Added to NRHP: May 10, 1979

The old Mitchell County Courthouse is an historic courthouse located at Bakersville, Mitchell County, North Carolina. It was built in 1907–1908, and is a two-story cast stone building in a vernacular Classical Revival style. It has a hipped roof with a two-stage square cupola crowned by a domical roof. It has four-sided turret-like corner bays.

It was added to the National Register of Historic Places in 1979. The new courthouse building was constructed in 2003 nearby on Long View Drive, replacing the historic courthouse. The old courthouse building currently houses the county Board of Elections office, as well as the Historical Society and Rural Education Partnership.
