= General John T. Wilder House =

Historic house in Tennessee, United States

- Gen. John T. Wilder House
- U.S. National Register of Historic Places
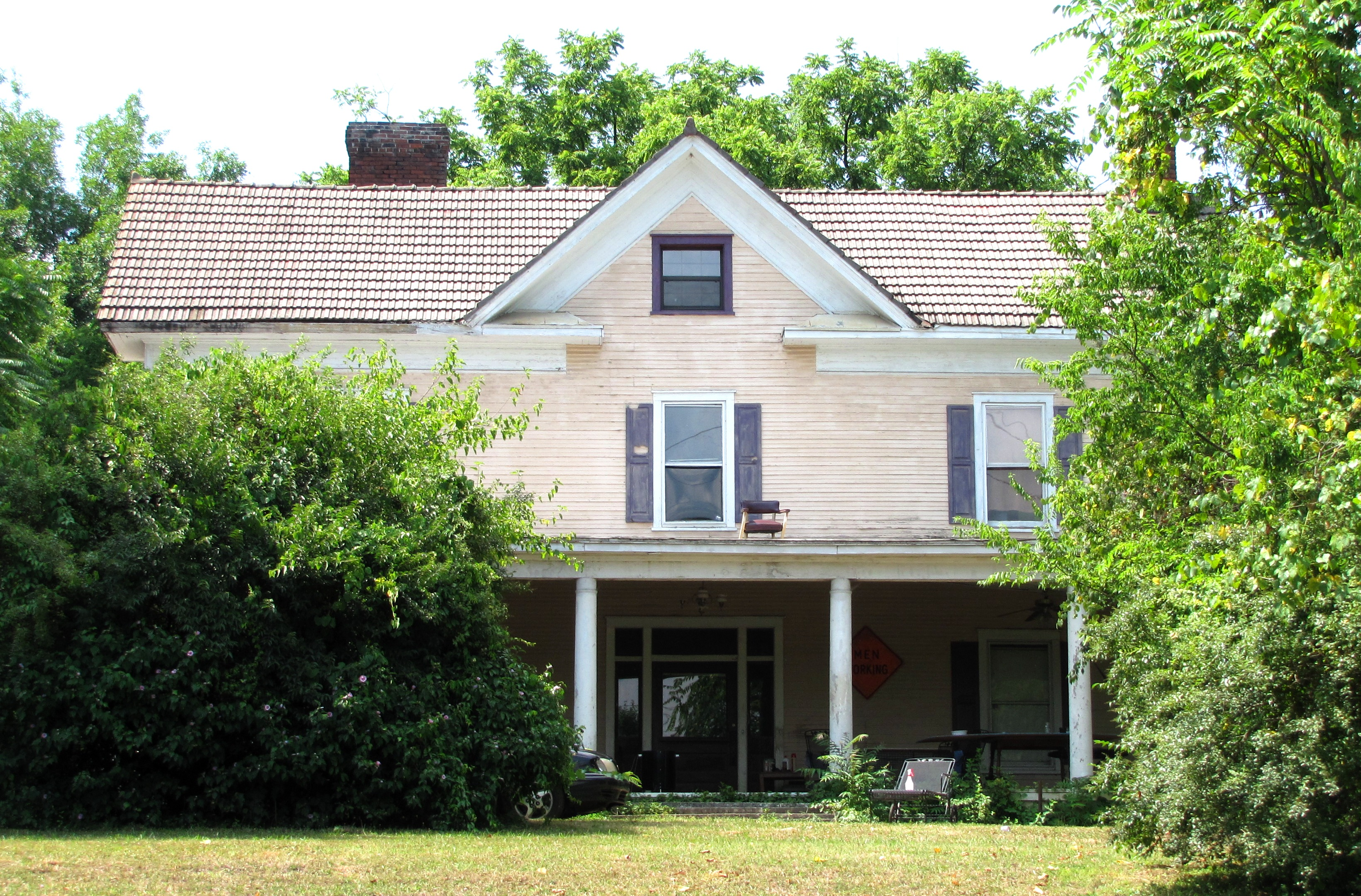
- Location: 2027 Riverside Dr. Knoxville, Tennessee
- Coordinates: 35°57′59″N 83°53′23″W
- Built: 1904
- NRHP reference No.: 97001463
- Added to NRHP: November 24, 1997

The General John T. Wilder House is a historic home located at 2027 Riverside Drive in Knoxville, Tennessee, United States. It was constructed by Union General John T. Wilder, leader of the 17th Indiana Volunteers (Lightning Brigade) who fought in the Civil War Battle of Chickamauga.

General Wilder built the home in 1904, presumably as a summer home since he already owned a home in the Fort Sanders neighborhood of Knoxville. The home is on the National Register of Historic Places.

He was appointed by four U.S. Presidents (Grant, McKinley, Roosevelt and Taft) to administer pensions in East Tennessee. Along with his friend, Capt. Hiram S. Chamberlain of Knox County, he also purchased over 700 acres of land in Roane County, Tennessee. They founded Rockwood, Tennessee, and the Roane Iron Company. He also had interests in cement, mining and banking around Knoxville, as well as a hotel atop Roan Mountain, Tennessee.
