= Cloudland High School =

Location
- 476 Cloudland Drive; Roan Mountain, Tennessee 37687; United States; 36.193497°N 82.0650761°W

Information
- Type: Public
- School district: Carter County School District
- NCES School ID: 470051000153
- Principal: Amy Horney
- Teaching staff: 19.10
- Grades: 7–12
- Enrollment: 245 (2023-2024)
- Average class size: 15
- Student to teacher ratio: 12.83
- Color
- Fight song: Scotland the Brave
- Mascot: Scotty the Scot
- Nickname: Landers
- Team name: Highlanders
- Alumni: Sonny Smith
- Website: sites.google.com/a/chs.carterk12.net/cloudland-high/

Cloudland High School is a public high school in Roan Mountain, Tennessee, United States and is one of the Carter County schools in north east Tennessee. The school has 337 students in grades seven through twelve.
