= Penland, North Carolina =

- Unincorporated community
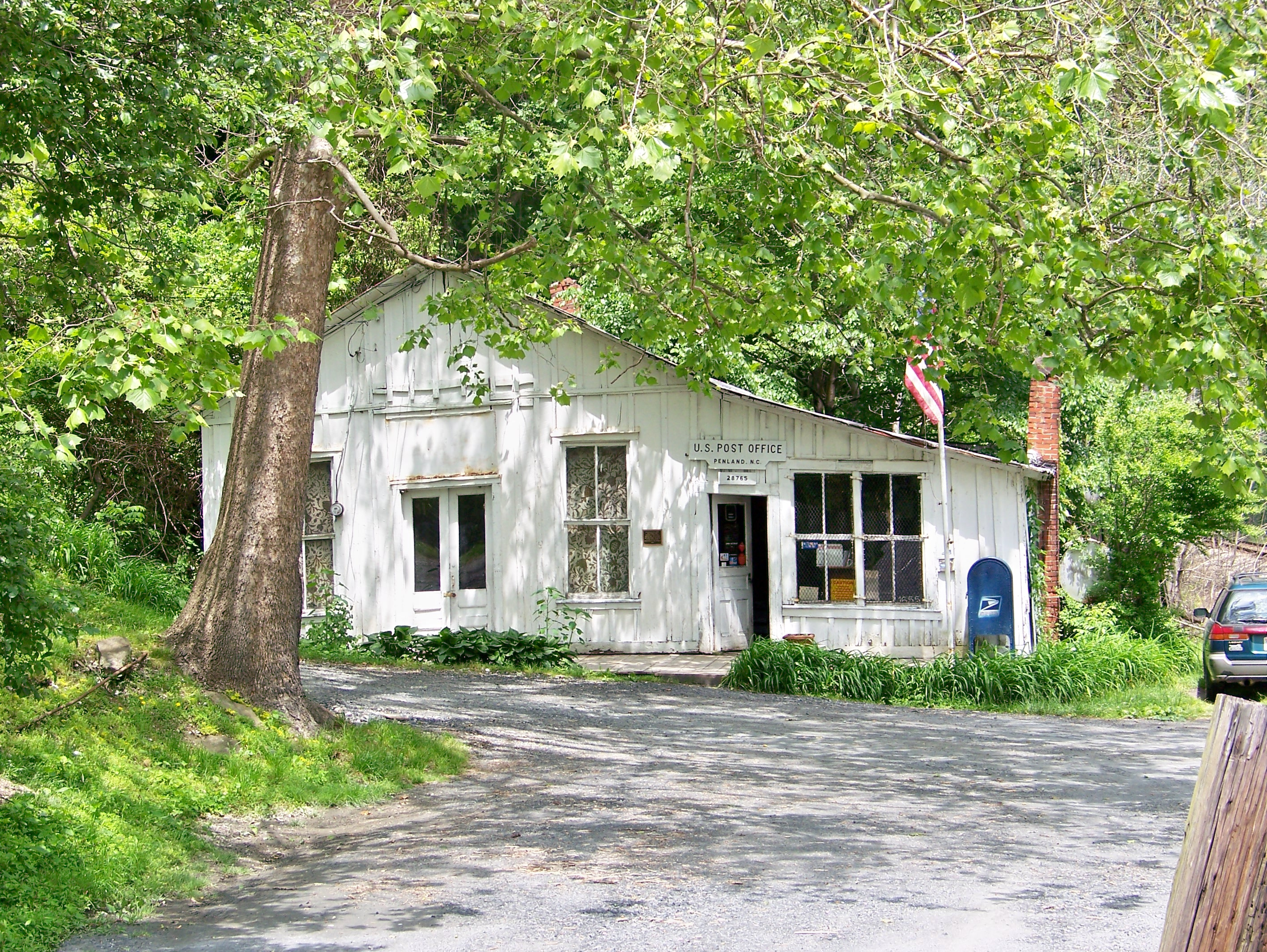
- Penland Post Office

- Location within North Carolina Location within the United States
- Coordinates: 35°55′48″N 82°06′43″W
- Country: United States
- State: North Carolina
- County: Mitchell
- Elevation: 2,461 ft (750 m)
- Time zone: UTC-5 (Eastern (EST))
  - Summer (DST): UTC-4 (EDT)
- ZIP code: 28765
- Area code: 828
- GNIS feature ID: 1021863

Penland is an unincorporated community in the Snow Creek Township of Mitchell County, North Carolina, United States. Penland is 2.9 miles (4.7 km) west-northwest of Spruce Pine. Approximately 200 year-round residents live in the community, the center of which is the Penland Road bridge crossing the North Toe River and CSX railroad line.

The community is located on the northern edge of western North Carolina's Black Mountains and is bisected by the North Toe River, a tributary of the Cane and Nolichucky rivers.

The Penland Post Office and General Store with ZIP code 28765, is listed on the National Register of Historic Places due to its significance as the longest continuously operating post office in the area. Also listed in the National Register of Historic Places are the Penland School Historic District Conley Ridge Cemetery and Beacon Church and the Henry Willis House.

The community is named for Robert Penland, a wealthy local businessman who in the 1850s operated an inn for travelers. Penland School of Craft, established in the early 1920s, is the largest and oldest professional crafts school in the United States. The school offers courses in all of the major craft media and many fine arts fields, bringing thousands of students and prominent instructors together every year. Nine of North Carolina's seventeen Living Treasures live within a five-mile radius of Penland.

Conley Ridge Cemetery and Beacon Church are in a Historic District and on the National Register of Historic Places. Beacon Church is recognized for its architecture and Conley Ridge Cemetery for its association with 19th Century families significant to the Penland Community and to the development of schools in the area, including Penland School.
