= Roan Mountain (Roan Highlands) =

Mountain straddling the North Carolina/Tennessee border

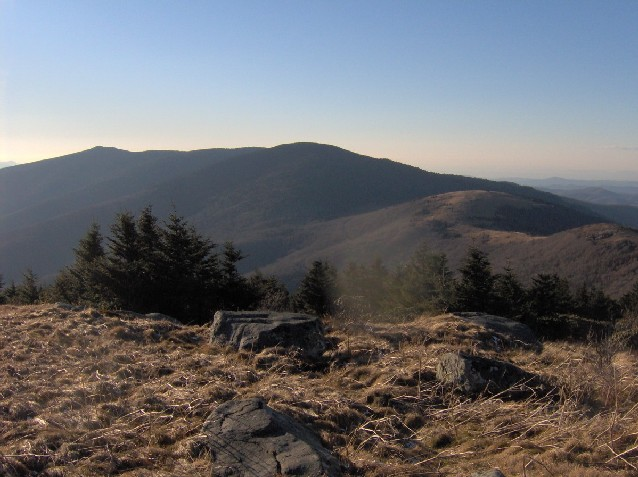
- Roan Mountain, looking northwest from Grassy Ridge Bald

Highest point
- Peak: Roan High Knob
- Elevation: 6,277 ft (1,913 m)
- Prominence: 3,515 ft (1,071 m)
- Parent peak: Potato Knob
- Coordinates: 36°06′16″N 82°07′20″W

Geography
- Location within North Carolina Location within Tennessee
- Location: Mitchell County, North Carolina, U.S.; Carter County, Tennessee, U.S.
- Parent range: Unaka Mountains
- Topo maps: USGS Bakersville, North Carolina; USGS Carvers Gap, North Carolina

Roan Mountain is a 6,277 ft (1,913 m) mountain straddling the North Carolina/Tennessee state line in the Unaka Range of the Southern Appalachian Mountains in the Southeastern United States. The range's highpoint, Roan is clad in a dense stand of Southern Appalachian spruce–fir forest and includes the world's largest natural rhododendron garden and the longest stretch of grassy bald in the Appalachian range. The Roan Highlands contain the highest quality remaining stretch of Fraser fir forest throughout the tree's entire range. The Cherokee National Forest and Pisgah National Forest converge atop the mountain, with Roan Mountain State Park located near its northern base. The Appalachian Trail traverses most of the Roan's crest. The Roan High Knob Shelter is the highest back-country shelter on the entire 2,174-mile (3,499 km) trail.

Roan Mountain comprises the greater part of the Roan Highlands, a 20-mile (32 km) massif stretching from Big Rock Creek in the west to U.S. Route 19 in the east. Most of this massif lies along the Tennessee-North Carolina border, between Carter County and Mitchell County. Yellow Mountain and Little Hump Mountain, on the northern tip of the massif, are part of the Roan Highlands but are generally not considered part of Roan Mountain proper. Roan Mountain encompasses five summits, which are divided into two sections by Carver's Gap. The first section—composed of Roan High Bluff and Roan High Knob—lies west of Carver's Gap and is characterized by a thick coniferous forest. This part of Roan is shaped something like the body of a double-humped camel, with the "humps" being High Bluff and High Knob. Tollhouse Gap lies between the two peaks and contains the rhododendron gardens. The second section of Roan Mountain—known as Grassy Ridge—is east of Carver's Gap, and is the longest stretch (approx. 7 mi or 11 km) of grassy bald in the Appalachian Mountains. A grassy bald is a type of highland meadow characterized by thick grass and sparse tree coverage. The three peaks atop Grassy Ridge are Round Bald, Jane Bald, and Grassy Ridge Bald. The bald area spans the summits of all three, covering an area roughly equal to 1,000 acres (400 hectares).

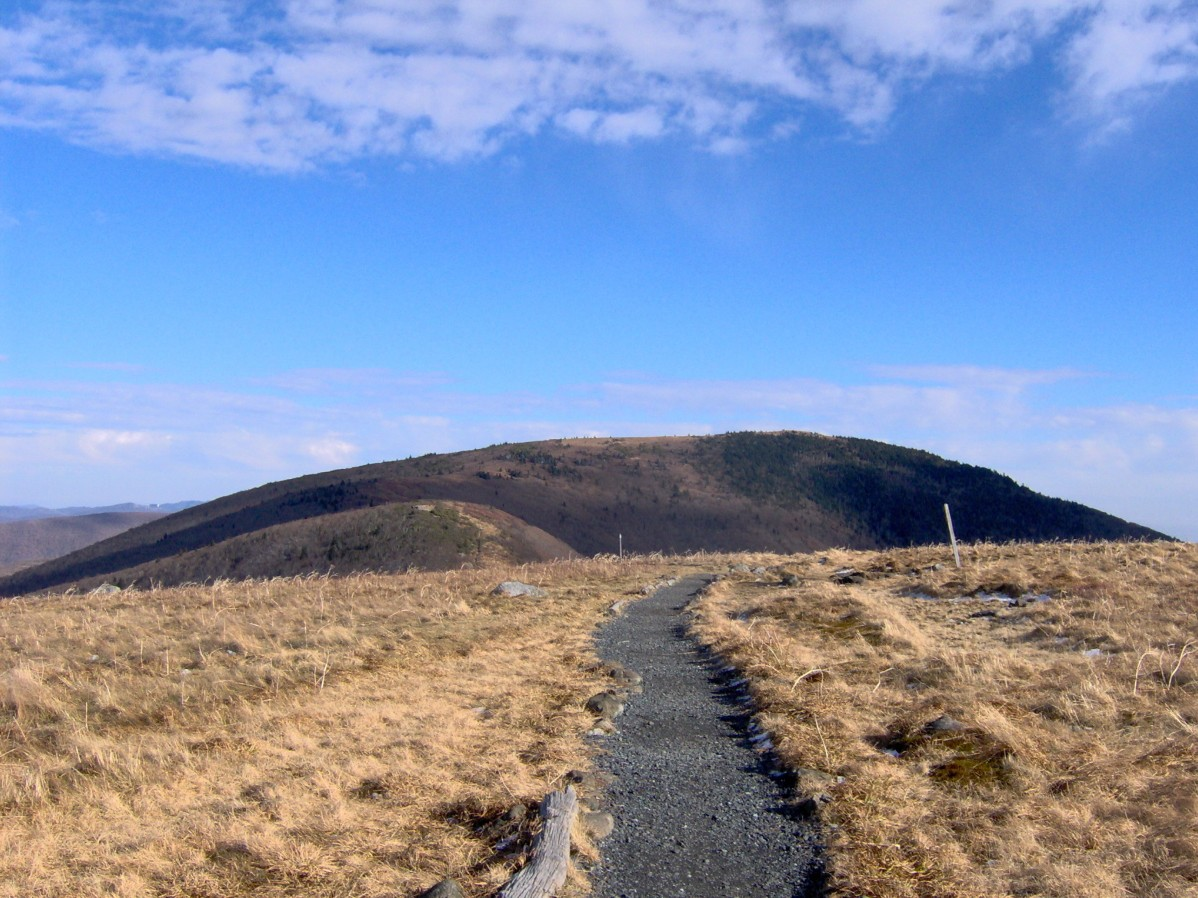
The Appalachian Trail crossing Round Bald with Jane Bald and Grassy Ridge Bald in the distance.

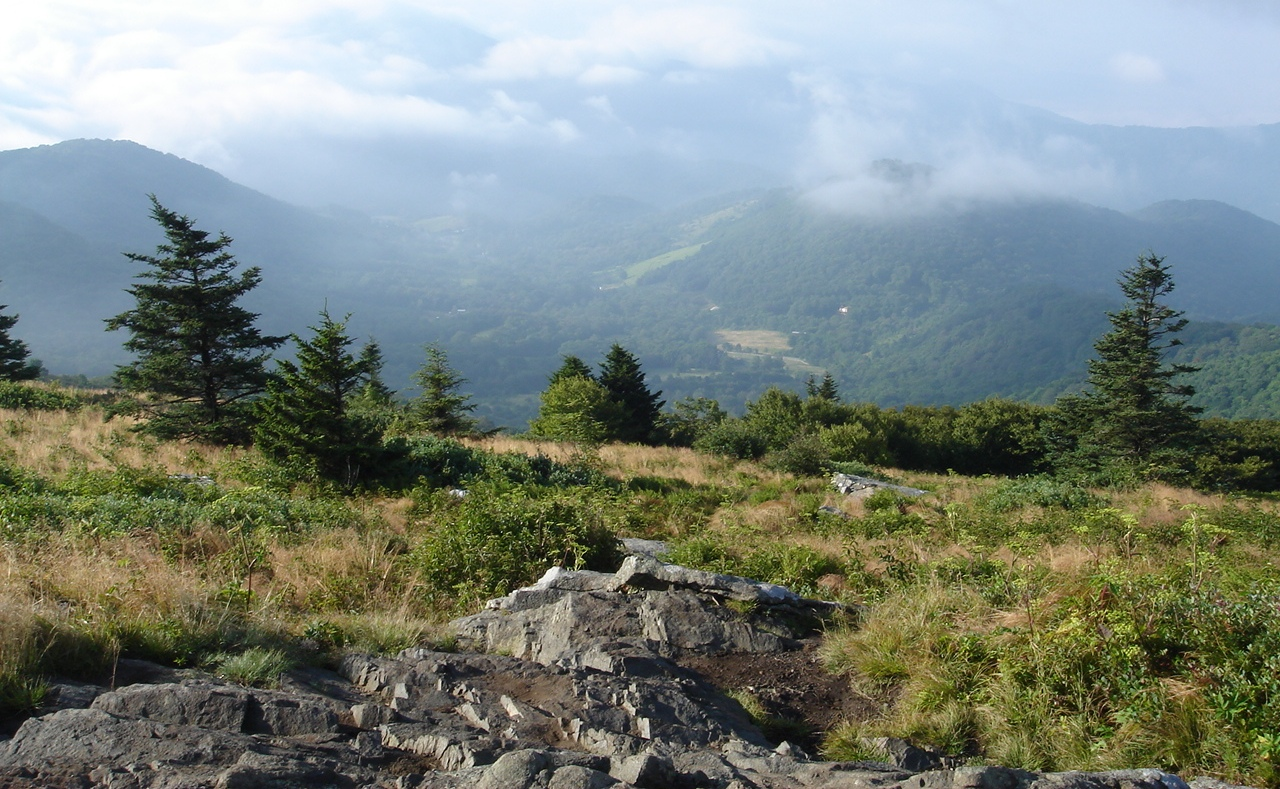
Eastward view from Round Bald.

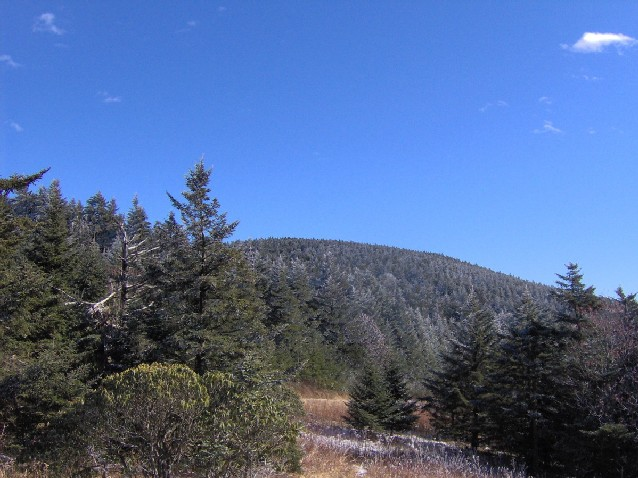
Roan High Knob, looking east from Tollhouse Gap.

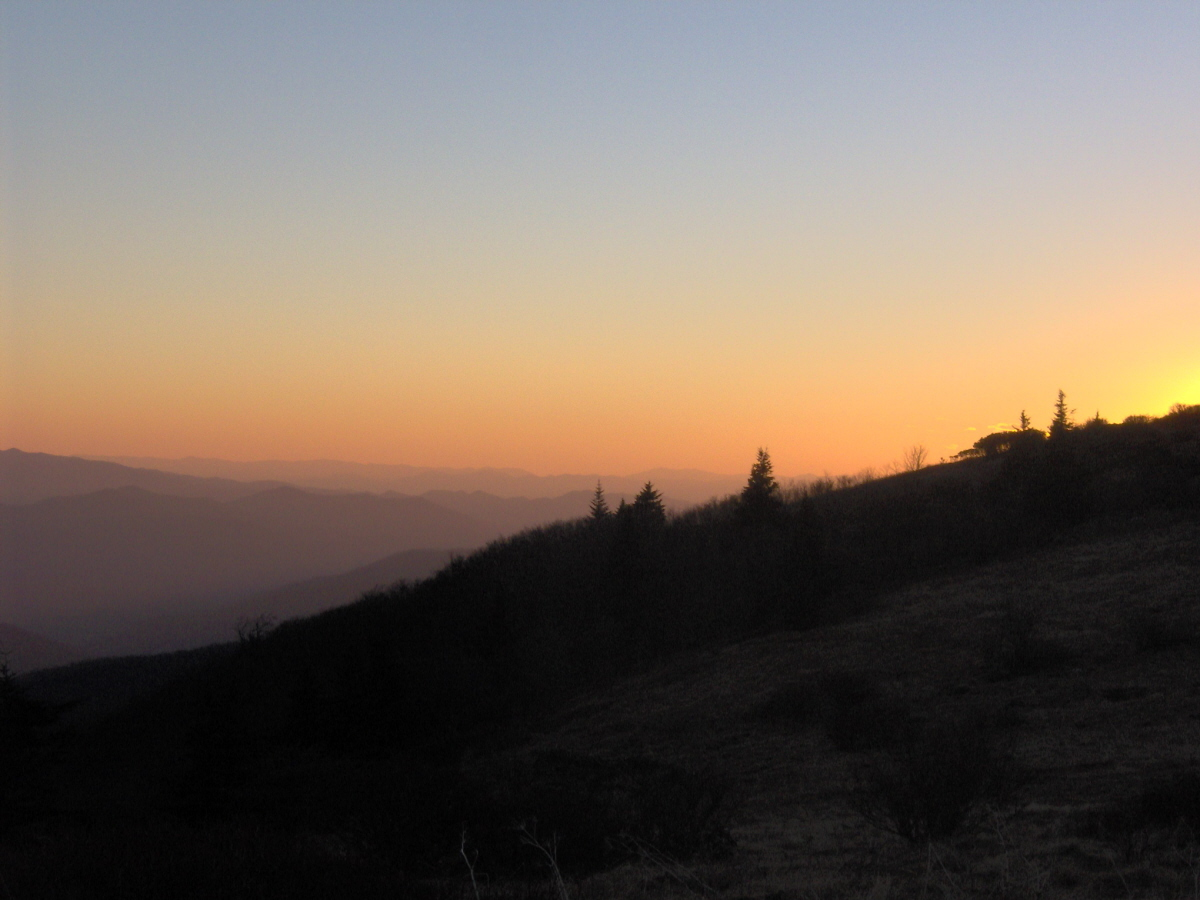
Sunset over the Blue Ridge Mountains, looking southwest from Grassy Ridge.

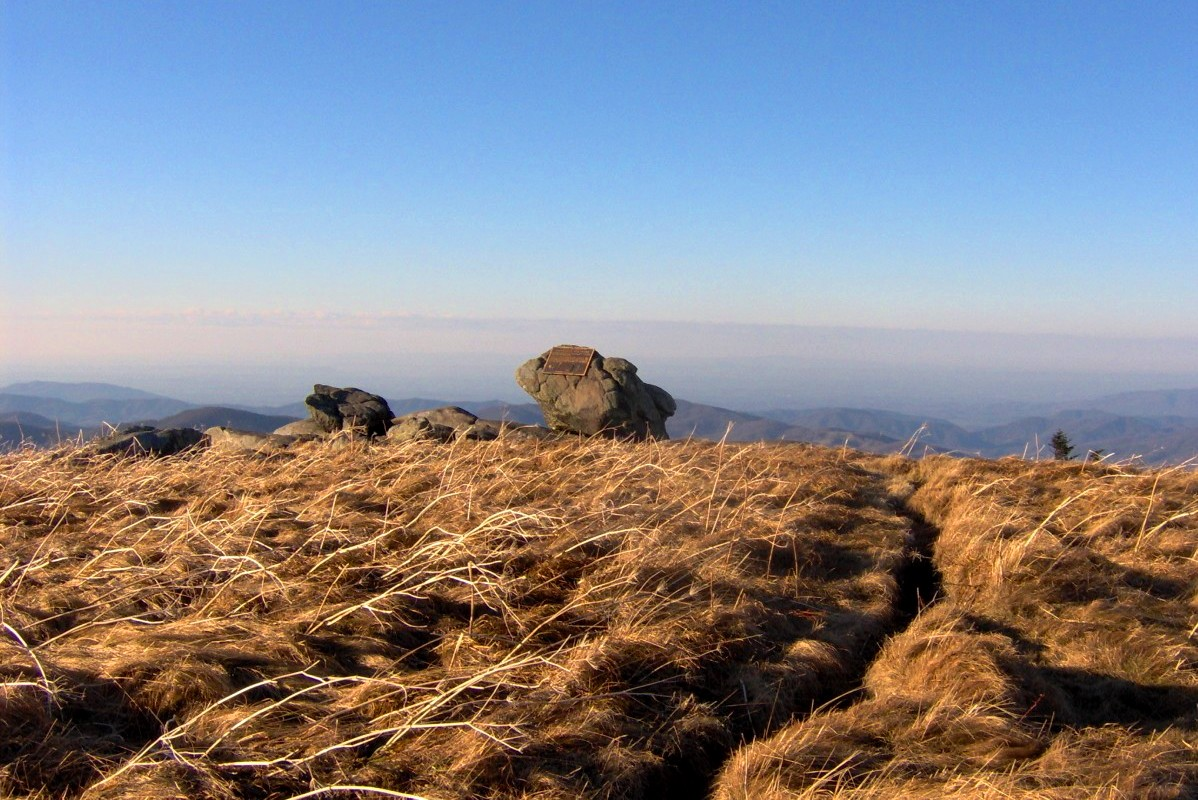
The summit of Grassy Ridge Bald.

== Summits ==
Roan Mountain contains five peaks:

Roan High Knob, located between Carver's Gap and Tollhouse, is the highest point on Roan Mountain with an elevation of 6,277 feet (1,913 m). The Tennessee-North Carolina border crosses its summit. High Knob is the highest point in Tennessee outside of the Great Smoky Mountains and is the 15th-highest peak in the eastern United States. The Appalachian Trail crosses High Knob's western slope, with a well-marked spur trail leading to the summit. The Roan High Knob Shelter is a few feet from the summit. The distance to the horizon (ignoring the effect of atmospheric refraction and natural obstructions) from Roan High Knob is approximately 164 miles (264 km).

Roan High Bluff, on the mountain's western end at 36°05′35″N 82°08′43″W, has an elevation of 6,260 feet (1,910 m) and is entirely within North Carolina. Unlike its sister peak, High Bluff is steep, rising sharply toward the summit with a rapid 1,000-foot (300 m) drop on its northwest side. While High Bluff's actual summit is closed to the public, an observation platform sits some 20 feet (6.1 m) below it and offers a 180-degree view of the valley to the northwest. The platform can be accessed via the Cloudland Trail, which rises out of Tollhouse Gap.

Round Bald rises near the center of the Roan massif. It has an elevation of about 5,824 feet (1,775 m) and overlooks Carver's Gap at the far western end of Grassy Ridge. The Appalachian Trail (following the state border) crosses its summit, first passing through a sparse tree line on the mountain's northwestern slope before emerging in the bald area near the top. There is a panoramic view from the summit, where it is possible to see the skyline of Charlotte, over 150km distant.

Jane Bald is a small knob between Round Bald and Grassy Ridge Bald, with an elevation of about 5,811 feet (1,771 m). A local legend relates its name to a woman named "Jane" who died of milk sickness while crossing the mountain. The bald area atop Jane is much less substantial than its two massive neighbors and is partially overgrown by rhododendron. The Appalachian Trail crosses its summit.

Grassy Ridge Bald dominates the center of Grassy Ridge. It has an elevation of about 6,185 feet (1,885 m), making it one of the highest grassy balds in the Appalachian Mountains (Black Balsam Knob, located southwest of Asheville, is slightly higher at 6,214 feet (1,894 m).) The bald area atop the mountain covers several 100 acres (40 hectares), with patches of trees and shrubbery in some places. The Appalachian Trail crosses the mountain's northern slope, with several spurs (usually marked) traversing the top of the mountain. The summit is adorned by a rock pile and a bronze plaque placed to honor the memory of a local highland farmer named Cornelius Rex Peake. There is a panoramic view from the summit, with Grandfather Mountain standing prominently to the east and the Black Mountains visible to the south. The summit of Grassy Ridge Bald is almost entirely within North Carolina.

Yellow Mountain (5,410 ft or 1,650 m) and Little Hump Mountain (5,446 ft or 1,660 m) comprise the northeastern fringe of the Roan Highlands. Both are traversed by the Appalachian Trail.

== Geology ==
The mountains were formed between 200 million and 400 million years ago during the Appalachian orogeny, when the North American and African plates collided, thrusting the rock upward. Among the rocks that make up Roan Mountain, the oldest are a type of metamorphic rock known as Cranberry gneiss. Formed over a billion years ago from ancient ocean sediments, they are among the oldest in the United States. Roan gneiss, another type of metamorphic rock found on the mountain, was formed roughly 800 million years ago. Also in abundance is Beech granite, a type of igneous rock believed to be 700 million years old.

== Ecology ==
The grassy Appalachian balds and Southern Appalachian spruce–fir forest of the Roan are globally imperilled ecosystems. The Roan Highlands are a biodiverse region which hosts dozens of rare, threatened, and endangered species. Five federally endangered species and one federally threatened species can be found at the Roan.

== History ==
Native Americans were the first human visitors to Roan Mountain. A Catawba legend tells of a great battle with the Cherokee atop the mountain that left the rhododendron colored crimson and parts of the mountain treeless. While there is no hard evidence that such a battle ever occurred, numerous Native American settlements have been found around the base of the mountain, and the Cherokee settlement of Old Fields stood near modern-day Elizabethton, Tennessee.

Throughout the 18th and 19th centuries, botanists paid frequent visits to the area to collect plant specimens. Among them were John Bartram, who crossed the Roan Highlands in the late 1730s while studying the botanical make-up of what is now the southeastern United States. Andre Micheaux followed in 1794, discovering several alpine species rarely found outside of the New England and Canadian latitudes. In 1799, John Fraser explored Roan Mountain, collecting specimens of rhododendron and noting the existence of the fir tree that now bears his name. Other early explorers included Elisha Mitchell, for whom Mount Mitchell is named, Thomas L. Clingman, who had also measured Kuwohi, and Harvard botanist Asa Gray. The origin of the name Roan is unknown. Hypotheses include that roan refers to the reddish splotches of rhododendron blooms in the spring or mountain ash berries in the fall, or that it refers to Daniel Boone's roan horse.

=== American Revolutionary War ===
In 1780, at the height of the American Revolution, British General Charles Cornwallis opened his invasion of the southern colonies with the capture of Charleston, South Carolina, and a victory over American forces at Camden. With South Carolina apparently secure, Cornwallis marched north toward Charlotte, North Carolina. During this march, Cornwallis dispatched a band of Loyalists under the command of Major Patrick Ferguson to raid western Carolina. To counter Ferguson's threat, a group of frontiersmen from the mountains of what is now East Tennessee, North Carolina and Virginia assembled at Fort Watauga, located in present-day Elizabethton. This rallied force of frontiersmen—known as the Overmountain Men—crossed the Roan Highlands en route to the other side of the Blue Ridge Mountains, where they engaged and defeated Ferguson's forces at the Battle of Kings Mountain. While most returned home afterward, some Overmountain Men continued southward to link up with Daniel Morgan's forces and contribute to the American victory at Cowpens in 1781.

Prior to the Revolution, very little gunpowder had been made in the United States. During the colonial period, most gunpowder used in America had been manufactured in Britain. In October 1777, the British Parliament banned the importation of gunpowder into the rebellious American colonies. To supply the Overmountain Men, 500 pounds of black powder were manufactured by Mary Patton and her husband at their Gap Creek powder mill in present-day Elizabethton. On the first night of the march from Sycamore Shoals, the Overmountain Men stored the Patton black powder in a dry cave known as "Shelving Rock" to protect it from the rain. Shelving Rock is located along TN-143 just outside Roan Mountain State Park.

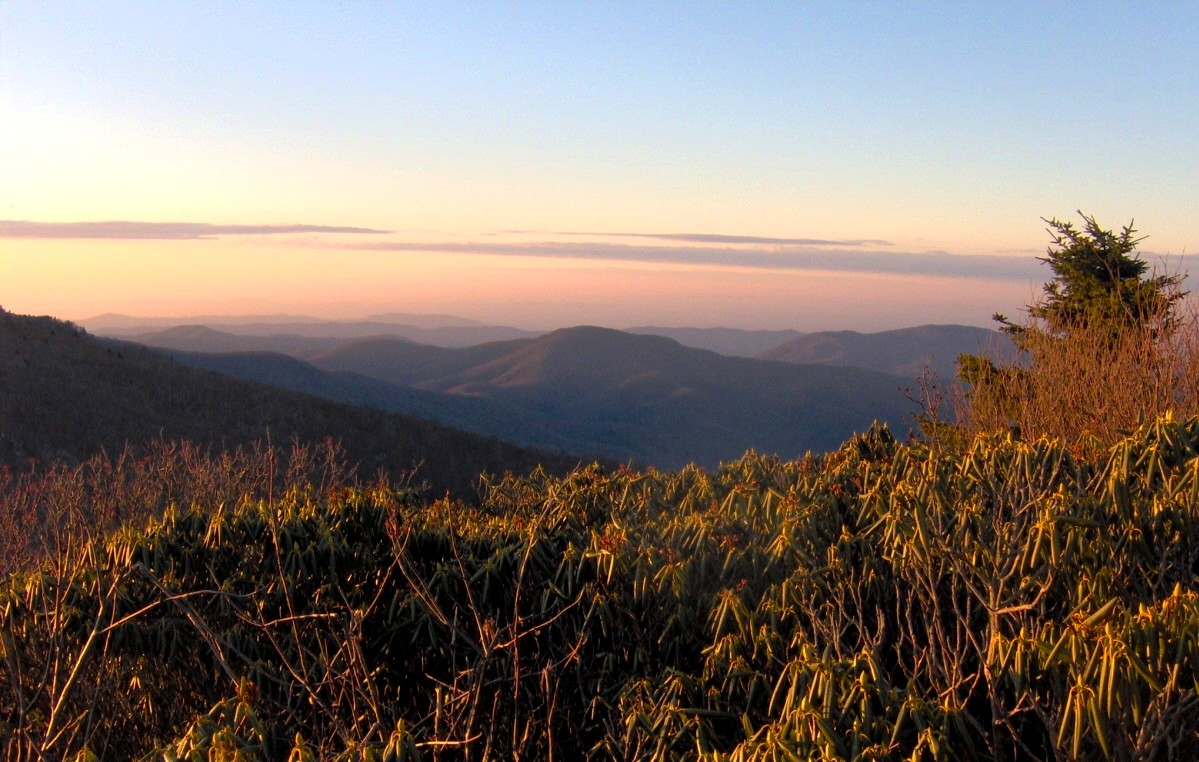
The view looking north from Jane Bald.

=== Mining and logging ===
In 1826, Josh, Ben, and Jake Perkins—three brothers from Crab Orchard, Tennessee—were searching for ginseng on the North Carolina side of Roan (possibly evading an arrest warrant in Tennessee) when they noted deposits of iron ore near Cranberry Creek. This led to the discovery of a massive iron ore deposit known as the Cranberry vein and the establishment of the Cranberry Mine, which extracted the ore for nearly a century until being forced to close by the Great Depression.

In the late 19th century, the logging industry was booming, due in large part to the arrival of the band saw and the logging railroad. As forests in the lower lands were cut down, loggers began moving into the more mountainous areas in search of timber. At Roan Mountain, a steam engine was set up in the gap between Round Bald and Jane Bald (this gap is still called "Engine Gap") to move lumber from the Tennessee side to the mills located on the North Carolina side. A large log flume was built between Burbank (near Hughes Gap) and the village of Roan Mountain. Erosion brought about by excessive logging was believed to be part of the cause of a massive flood that destroyed much of the area in 1901.

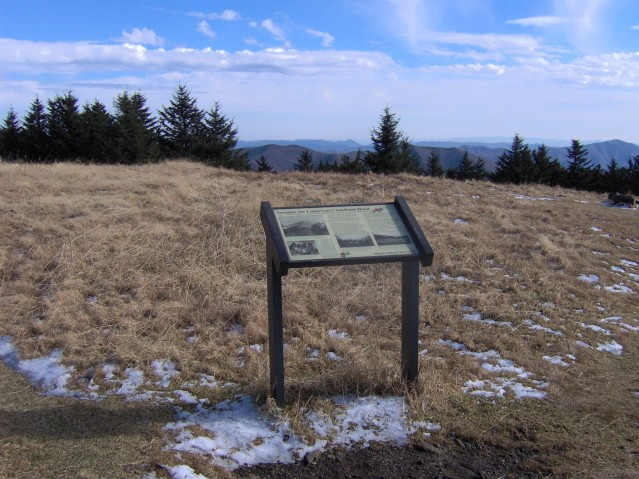
USFS sign marking the former site of the Cloudland Hotel (c. 1885–1910) at Tollhouse Gap.

=== Cloudland Hotel ===
Tourists had been visiting Roan Mountain since the mid-19th century. In 1857, two such tourists recalled their visit to the mountain in an article written for New Harper's Weekly:

The sweep of the vision in every direction is unlimited, except by the curvature of the earth or the haziness of the atmosphere. The first idea suggested is that you are looking over a vast blue ocean, whose monstrous billows, once heaving and pitching in wild disorder, have been suddenly arrested by some overruling power.

It was experiences such as this that no doubt persuaded former Civil War general and mining tycoon John T. Wilder to construct a 20-room spruce log lodge atop Roan Mountain in 1877. The lodge was built in the area now known as Tollhouse Gap, between Roan High Knob and Roan High Bluff.

Quickly seeing the value in providing a summertime escape from the hot, humid lowlands and overcrowded cities, Wilder began construction on a much larger hotel atop Roan in the early 1880s. To move materials up to the construction site (and to keep the hotel supplied once it was finished), Wilder had to construct a road across Carver's Gap. He also built a house and the Roan Mountain Inn in what is now the village of Roan Mountain, Tennessee. The Cloudland Hotel, as it came to be called, was completed in 1885. The hotel stood a few hundred meters away from the spruce log structure that preceded it.

The Cloudland Hotel was billed as a health resort, especially for those suffering from hay fever. Over the years, its guest list grew to include various American politicians and European royalty. Rates were $2/day, $10/week, or $30/month. The hotel sat right along the state line, and a white line was even painted across the dining room, following the border. During this period, alcohol consumption was legal in Tennessee but illegal in North Carolina, so alcoholic drinks could only be served on the Tennessee side of the line. One story tells of a local North Carolina sheriff who "guarded" the dining room to ensure no one imbibed on the North Carolina side.

The high operating costs of maintaining a mountain-top hotel eventually doomed the Cloudland. The hotel was abandoned by 1910 and quickly fell into a state of disrepair. Wilder sold the hotel shortly before his death, and the new owner auctioned off the decaying building room-by-room. By 1927, a pile of rubble was all that remained.

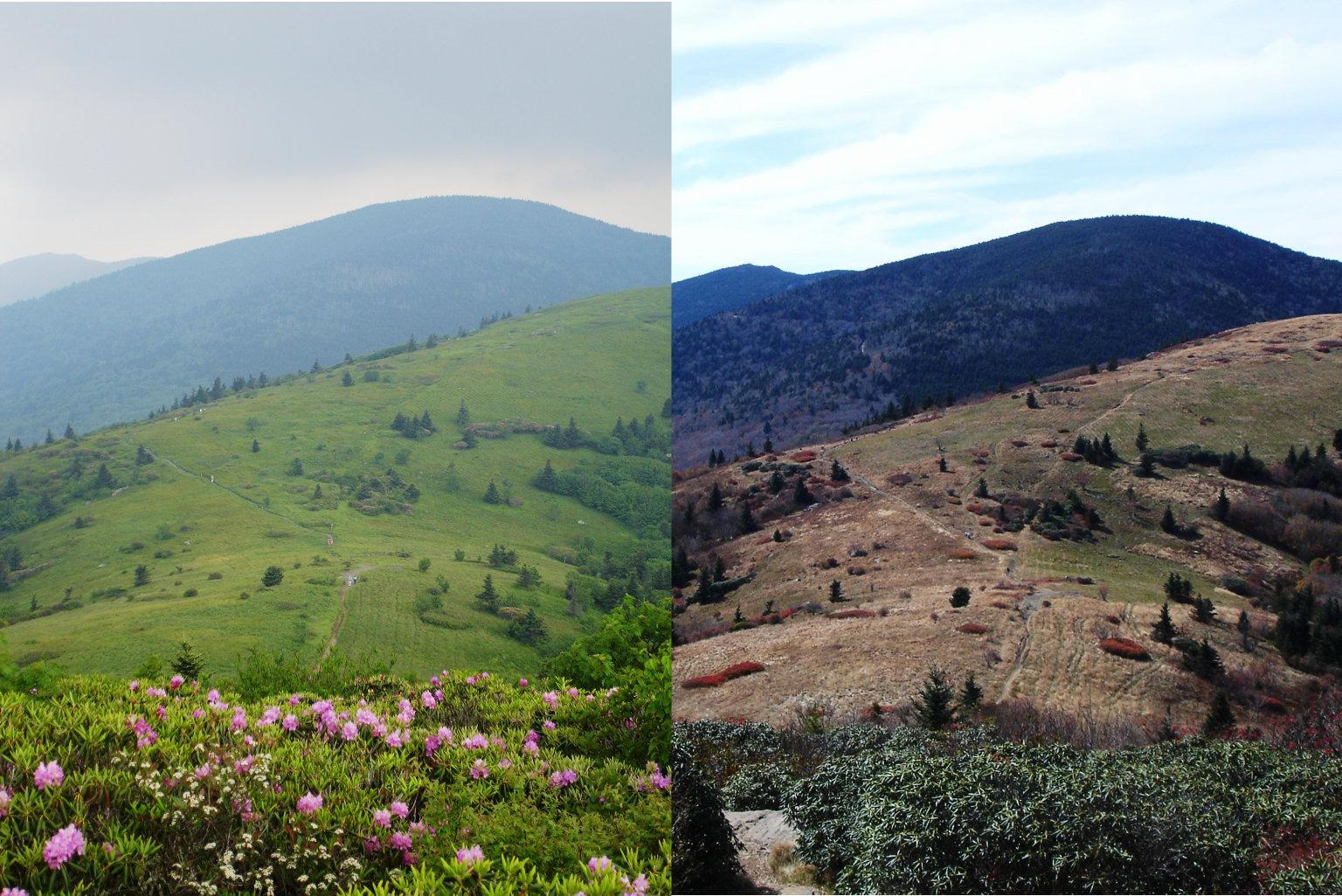
View of the Roan Highlands in Spring and Autumn.

=== 20th century ===
In 1933, the Civilian Conservation Corps constructed a fire tower and fire warden's cabin at the summit of Roan High Knob. Although the tower proved ineffective and did not last long (the cabin was renovated in 1980 and now serves as the Roan High Knob Shelter), the United States Forest Service purchased 7,000 acres (2,800 hectares) atop Roan Mountain in 1941, putting an end to abusive logging practices. Between 1959 and 1974, the state of Tennessee acquired just over 2,000 acres (810 hectares) of land that would eventually comprise Roan Mountain State Park.

In the mid-20th century, Cornelius Rex Peake operated the highest cultivated farm in the U.S. east of the Rocky Mountains and became instrumental in bringing the conservationist movement to the mountain. A plaque at the summit of Grassy Ridge Bald honors his memory. Most recently in the latter part of the 20th century, parts of the same farm areas have been re-cultivated by S. Kenneth Wilson, a descendant of the Peake and Ayers families that owned a significant amount of land which now makes up much of the North Carolina side of the Roan. In addition to herding livestock on and around the balds, his family has made significant efforts to restore many of the medicinal plant species that have been hunted to near extinction in the area. In 2007 the USDA recognized his livestock farm to be the highest operating on the entire east coast of the U.S.

== Access ==
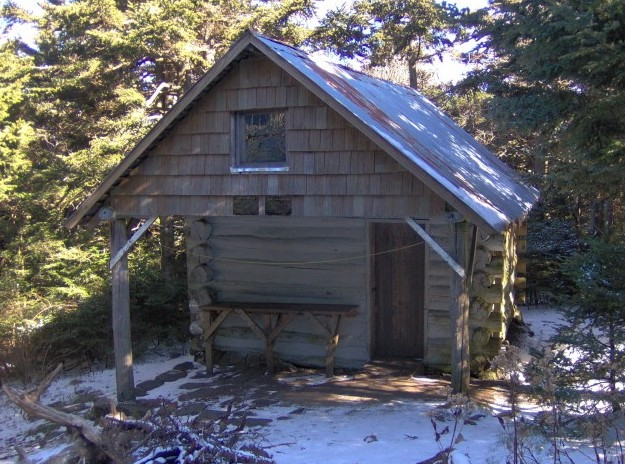
The Roan High Knob Shelter.

State Routes TN 143/NC 261—which connect the village of Roan Mountain with Bakersville, North Carolina—ascend the northeast slope of Roan Mountain, crossing its crest at Carver's Gap. The Appalachian Trail can be accessed from Carver's Gap (it runs perpendicular to the highway), where there is a small parking lot. To the east (across the street from the parking lot), the trail ascends Round Bald and proceeds across Grassy Ridge. To the west, the trail swings around Roan High Knob just over one mile (1.6 km) to Tollhouse Gap, where it turns north.

A paved road crosses the south side of Roan High Knob, connecting Carver's Gap with Tollhouse Gap, although this road is closed in winter. This road leads to the Cloudland Trailhead, which crosses the Rhododendron Gardens and ascends the western slope of Roan High Bluff to the observation platform just below the summit. The trail is just over a mile (1.6 km) long.

The Roan High Knob Shelter, near the summit of Roan High Knob, can accommodate 15 backpackers. The shelter is maintained by the Tennessee Eastman Hiking and Canoeing Club. However, Overmountain Shelter (found approximately 5.5 miles (8.9 km) from Carver's Gap towards 19-E) has been indefinitely closed since September 4, 2019. The U.S. Forest Service has deemed this famous red barn structurally unsound.

The Appalachian Trail, after traversing Iron Mountain to the west, crosses Hughes Gap and ascends Roan's northern slope to Tollhouse Gap. From there, it makes a sharp turn to the east, crossing Roan High Knob, Carver's Gap, Grassy Ridge, and Yellow and Little Hump Mountains before descending to US-19 and the White Rocks Mountain area. From the slopes of Old Black in the Great Smoky Mountains, some 150 miles (240 km) to the south, to Mount Washington in the White Mountains of New Hampshire, some 1,500 miles (2,400 km) to the north, Roan Mountain is the only area where the trail rises above the 6,000-foot (1,800 m) mark.

== See also ==
- Carter County, Tennessee
- Eastern Continental Divide
