= Roan Mountain, Tennessee =

Roan Mountain
- CDP
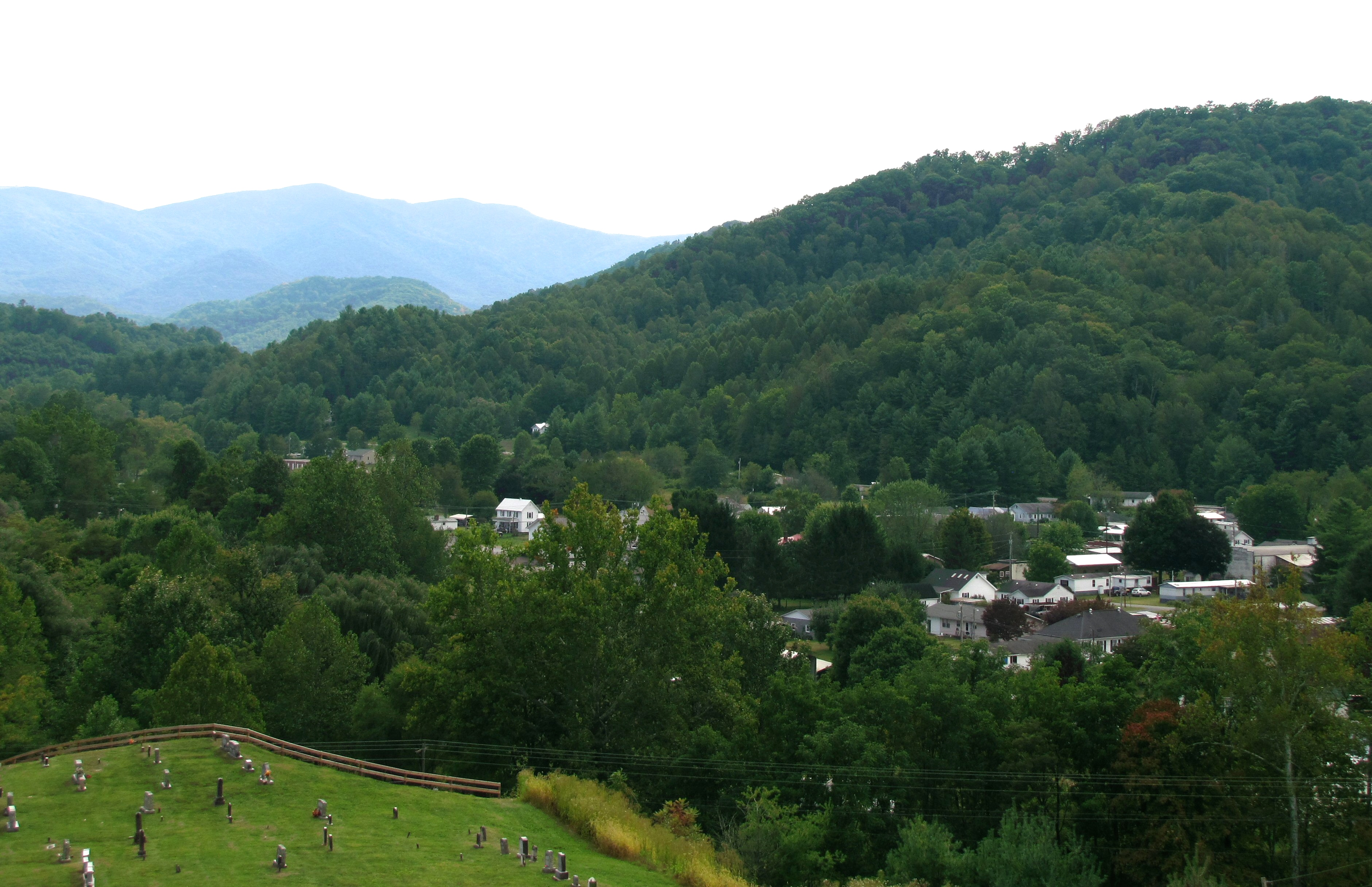
- Roan Mountain, the community (foreground, right), and Roan Mountain, the mountain (background, left)
- Motto: Nature's Beauty At Its Best
- Location of Roan Mountain, Tennessee
- Coordinates: 36°11′39″N 82°4′6″W
- Country: United States
- State: Tennessee
- County: Carter

Area
  - Total: 6.63 sq mi (17.16 km^{2})
  - Land: 6.63 sq mi (17.16 km^{2})
  - Water: 0 sq mi (0.00 km^{2})
- Elevation: 2,579 ft (786 m)

Population (2020)
  - Total: 1,078
  - Density: 162.7/sq mi (62.82/km^{2})
- Time zone: UTC-5 (Eastern (EST))
  - Summer (DST): UTC-4 (EDT)
- ZIP code: 37687
- Area code: 423
- FIPS code: 47-63840
- GNIS feature ID: 1299556
- Website: http://www.roanmountain.com/

Roan Mountain is a census-designated place (CDP) in Carter County, Tennessee, United States. The population was 1,360 at the 2010 census. It is part of the Johnson City Metropolitan Statistical Area, which is a component of the Johnson City–Kingsport–Bristol, TN-VA Combined Statistical Area – commonly known as the Tri-Cities region.

== History ==
In September 1780, the Overmountain Men— a group of American soldiers from the trans-Appalachian frontier who fought during the American Revolution— passed through Roan Mountain en route to North Carolina, where they would engage and defeat a group of loyalists at the Battle of Kings Mountain. On the night of September 26, this force camped at Shelving Rock, between what is now the Roan Mountain CDP and Roan Mountain State Park, where a rocky outcropping provided a convenient place for the soldiers to store their weapons and gunpowder. The site is now part of the Overmountain Victory National Historic Trail, and the field where the soldiers camped is listed on the National Register of Historic Places.

During the 1870s, John T. Wilder, an industrialist and former Union general, began purchasing large tracts of iron ore-rich lands in the Roan Mountain area, and established several mining operations in the region. In the early 1880s, he established the Roan Mountain community, originally known as Roan Mountain Station, as a stop along the East Tennessee and Western North Carolina Railroad ("Tweetsie"). He laid out streets, planted trees, and built a hotel, the Roan Mountain Inn, as well as a house for his family (the house still stands at the corner of Main and Stratton). In 1885, he established a resort atop the mountain, the Cloudland Hotel, which catered to people seeking relief from hay fever and other seasonal allergies. In 1998, Roan Mountain was victim of massive flooding due to a devastating winter storm which caused widespread damage. The flood killed 7 people, and 200 mobile homes and 15 houses were destroyed. Bridges and cars were swept away by the flood water.

== Geography ==
Roan Mountain is located in northeast Tennessee at 36°11′39″N 82°4′6″W (36.194219, -82.068417). According to the United States Census Bureau, the CDP has a total area of 6.6 square miles (17.2 km^{2}), all land. The elevation of Roan Mountain near the center of the CDP is 2,550 feet (780 m).

Roan Mountain is located in southeastern Carter County, near the Tennessee-North Carolina border. The community is situated along the upper Doe River at the river's confluence with Buck Creek. The mountain with which the community shares its name, Roan Mountain, rises several miles to the south. Reaching an elevation of 6,285 feet (1,916 m), the mountain is the highest point in Tennessee outside the Great Smoky Mountains. The Appalachian Trail traverses the mountain before descending and crossing U.S. Route 19E near the state line east of the CDP, and then turning westward across the crest of White Rocks Mountain, which rises immediately north of the CDP.

Roan Mountain State Park lies immediately south of the CDP. Elk Park, North Carolina is located across the state line in Avery County, North Carolina. Hampton, Tennessee, is located further down the Doe Valley to the northwest.

== Demographics ==
Historical population
Census	Pop.	Note	%±
2020	1,078		—
U.S. Decennial Census

As of the census of 2000, there were 1,160 people, 484 households, and 351 families residing in the CDP. The population density was 60.4/km^{2} (156.4/sq mi) and there were 539 housing units at an average density of 72.7 per square mile (28.1/km^{2}). The racial makeup of the CDP was 99.48% White, 0.26% African American, 0.09% Native American, and 0.17% from two or more races. Hispanic or Latino of any race were 0.17% of the population.

There were 484 households, out of which 31.6% had children under the age of 18 living with them, 56.0% were married couples living together, 14.0% had a female householder with no husband present, and 27.3% were non-families. 24.8% of all households were made up of individuals, and 11.2% had someone living alone who was 65 years of age or older. The average household size was 2.40 and the average family size was 2.86.

In the CDP, the population was spread out, with 23.6% under the age of 18, 7.2% from 18 to 24, 30.1% from 25 to 44, 24.1% from 45 to 64, and 15.1% who were 65 years of age or older. The median age was 38 years. For every 100 females, there were 96.6 males. For every 100 females age 18 and over, there were 95.6 males.

The median income for a household in the CDP was $17,813, and the median income for a family was $24,524. Males had a median income of $19,044 versus $20,792 for females. The per capita income for the CDP was $12,046. About 23.4% of families and 27.1% of the population were below the poverty line, including 35.4% of those under age 18 and 26.4% of those age 65 or over.

== Education ==
Cloudland Elementary School and Cloudland High School are located in Roan Mountain.

== Culture ==
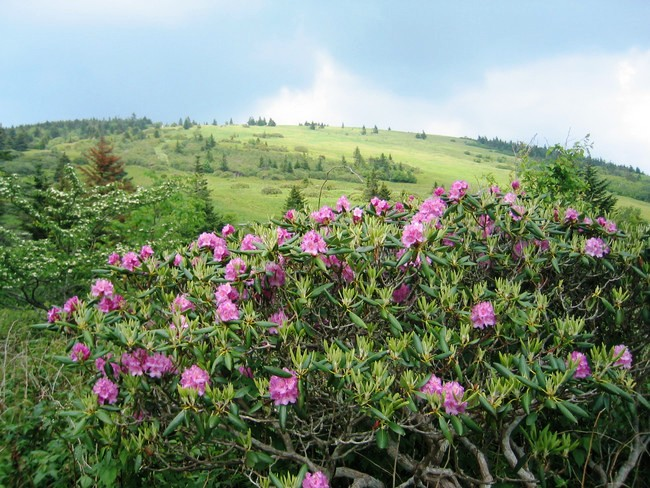
The Roan Mountain Rhododendron Gardens are located above the community of Roan Mountain

The Roan Mountain Rhododendron Festival is held each summer at the lower elevation of Roan Mountain State Park, offering visitors opportunities to sample traditional foods, purchase locally handmade crafts, and listen to a variety of traditional Southern Appalachian musicians, as well as to view the alpine catawba rhododendron gardens whose blooming season usually peaks during the third or fourth weekend in June. The festival began in 1947.

The Roan Mountain Hilltoppers, a well-known old-time string band performing traditional Appalachian music, hail from the Roan Mountain area. This family band has been featured at venues including the Smithsonian Museum's American Folklife Festival, the 1982 World's Fair in Knoxville, Tennessee, and the Country Music Hall of Fame in Nashville. The band has received numerous awards and recognitions, and acquired an unexpected audience after Malcolm McLaren sampled some of its music in his 1982 hit song, "Buffalo Gals." Later the Hilltoppers' home was visited by the Sex Pistols and Boy George.

== Transportation ==
- Interstate 26 to Exit 31 (Elizabethton);
- U.S. Route 321 east to Elizabethton, and;
- U.S. Route 19E at Elizabethton then south into Roan Mountain, Tennessee.

US 19 splits into US 19E and US 19W in Bluff City, Tennessee, north of Elizabethton. The routes rejoin in rural Yancey County, North Carolina. While US 19W heads directly for Interstate 26 at Exits 35 and 36 in Johnson City, Tennessee, US 19E takes a 70-mile (113 km) path through the heart of the Unaka Mountains. US 19W splits from I-26 shortly before reaching the Tennessee-North Carolina border, and passes through the mountains of Yancey County, North Carolina.

Alternate US 19W is co-signed with Interstate 26 for much of its length in Tennessee. US 19E in Tennessee runs concurrently with State Route 37.

Tennessee State Route 143 intersects US-19E in the Roan Mountain community, and connects the area with both the state park and Carvers Gap (near the summit of Roan Mountain).
