= Mitchell County, North Carolina =

County in North Carolina, United States

- County
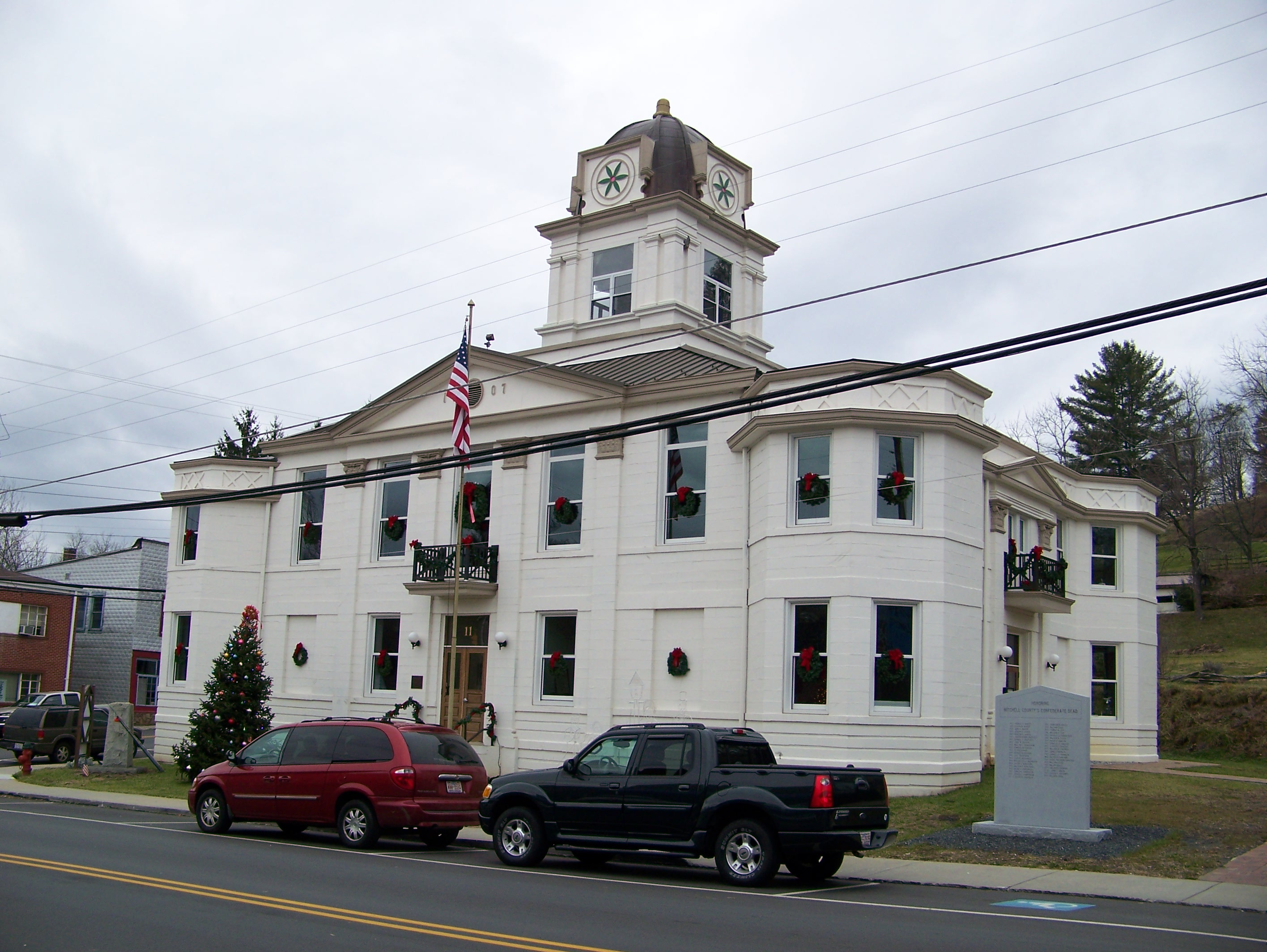
- Old Mitchell County Courthouse in Bakersville

- Flag Seal

- Location within the U.S. state of North Carolina
- Interactive map of Mitchell County, North Carolina
- Coordinates: 36.01°N 82.16°W
- Country: United States
- State: North Carolina
- Founded: 1861
- Named for: Elisha Mitchell
- Seat: Bakersville
- Largest community: Spruce Pine

Area
  - Total: 221.88 sq mi (574.7 km^{2})
  - Land: 221.25 sq mi (573.0 km^{2})
  - Water: 0.63 sq mi (1.6 km^{2}) 0.28%

Population (2020)
  - Total: 14,903
  - Estimate (2025): 15,062 ▲
  - Density: 67.36/sq mi (26.01/km^{2})
- Time zone: UTC−5 (Eastern)
  - Summer (DST): UTC−4 (EDT)
- Congressional district: 11th
- Website: www.mitchellcounty.org

Mitchell County is a county located in the U.S. state of North Carolina. As of the 2020 census, the population was 14,903. Its county seat is Bakersville.

The county is home to Spruce Pine, nicknamed the "Mineral City of the World", and Bakersville, "Gateway to Roan Mountain", which includes the world's largest natural rhododendron garden and the longest stretch of grassy bald in the Appalachian range. Throughout the year such festivals as North Carolina Mineral and Gem Festival and North Carolina Rhododendron Festival bring visitors to the area.

== History ==
The county was formed in 1861 from parts of Burke County, Caldwell County, McDowell County, Watauga County, and Yancey County. It was named for Elisha Mitchell, professor of mathematics, chemistry, geology, and mineralogy at the University of North Carolina from 1818 until his death in 1857. Dr. Mitchell was the first scientist to argue that a nearby peak in the Black Mountains was the highest point east of the Mississippi River. He measured the mountain's height and climbed and explored it. In 1857 he fell to his death on a waterfall on the side of the mountain. The mountain was subsequently named Mount Mitchell in his honor.

By 1899, Mitchell County had a sundown town policy of preventing Black Americans from living or working in the county. By the early 1920s, Black Americans began working and living in the county in larger numbers, especially as mine workers and as convict laborers constructing local infrastructure, including new state highways such as what is now US Highway 19E. In September 1923, a 75-year-old White woman named Alice Thomas accused John Goss, an escaped Black convict laborer, of raping her. A White mob formed in Spruce Pine, and when they could not locate the fugitive Goss, the mob (which included members of the Ku Klux Klan) forced nearly all of the Black people onto train cars heading out of the county. Governor Cameron Morrison, an ally of the infrastructure construction and mining industries, declared martial law and called in the National Guard in an attempt to stop the mob violence, but by the time the Guard units arrived two days later, the Black mine and construction laborers had already been driven from the county. The National Guard occupied Spruce Pine for nearly two weeks. Despite Morrison's declaration of martial law having little effect, it was the first time martial law was declared in response to an instance of mass racial violence in the United States. Ultimately, 86 members of the white supremacist mob were indicted for their actions, many of whom pleaded guilty to minor offences. Goss was arrested in Hickory four days after the alleged rape, and at the orders of the Governor, jailed in Raleigh to avert lynching. He was tried three weeks later in Mitchell County, convicted by jury after five minutes of deliberation, and executed by electrocution.

The county took a direct hit from "The Storm of the Century", also known as the "’93 Superstorm", or "The (Great) Blizzard of 1993". This storm event was similar in nature to a hurricane. The storm occurred between March 12–13, 1993, on the East Coast of North America. Parts of Cuba, Gulf Coast States, Eastern United States and Eastern Canada were greatly impacted. The county suffered a tragic event on May 3, 2002, when a fire broke out at the Mitchell County jail in Bakersville, North Carolina. Eight men lost their lives in the fire.

Mitchell County was one of the three entirely dry counties in North Carolina, along with Graham and Yancey, but in March 2009, after much controversy, the Town of Spruce Pine approved beer, wine and limited retail sale.

== Geography ==
According to the U.S. Census Bureau, the county has a total area of 221.88 square miles (574.7 km^{2}), of which 221.25 square miles (573.0 km^{2}) is land and 0.63 square miles (1.6 km^{2}) (0.28%) is water. It is the fourth-smallest county in North Carolina by land area and second-smallest by total area. The northwest sections of county border the state of Tennessee. Sections of both the Blue Ridge Parkway and Appalachian Trail are located in the county. Parts of the Pisgah National Forest are located in the northern sections of the county. Several conservation lands are within Pisgah National Forest in Mitchell and neighboring Avery County.

=== National protected areas ===
- Blue Ridge Parkway (part)
- Cherokee National Forest (part)
- Pisgah National Forest (part)

=== State and local protected areas ===
- Pisgah National Forest Game Land (part)
- Pisgah (WRC) Game Land (part)
- Yellow Mountain State Natural Area (part)

=== Major water bodies ===
- Nolichucky River
- North Toe River

=== Adjacent counties ===
- Carter County, Tennessee – north-northeast
- Avery County – northeast
- McDowell County – south
- Yancey County – southwest
- Unicoi County, Tennessee – north-northwest

=== Major highways ===
- US 19E
- NC 80
- NC 197
- NC 226
- NC 226A
- NC 261
- Blue Ridge Parkway

== Demographics ==
Historical population
Census	Pop.	Note	%±
1870	4,705		—
1880	9,435		100.5%
1890	12,807		35.7%
1900	15,221		18.8%
1910	17,245		13.3%
1920	11,278		−34.6%
1930	13,962		23.8%
1940	15,980		14.5%
1950	15,143		−5.2%
1960	13,906		−8.2%
1970	13,447		−3.3%
1980	14,428		7.3%
1990	14,433		0.0%
2000	15,687		8.7%
2010	15,579		−0.7%
2020	14,903		−4.3%
2025 (est.)	15,062	▲	1.1%
U.S. Decennial Census; 1790–1960 1900–1990; 1990–2000 2010 2020

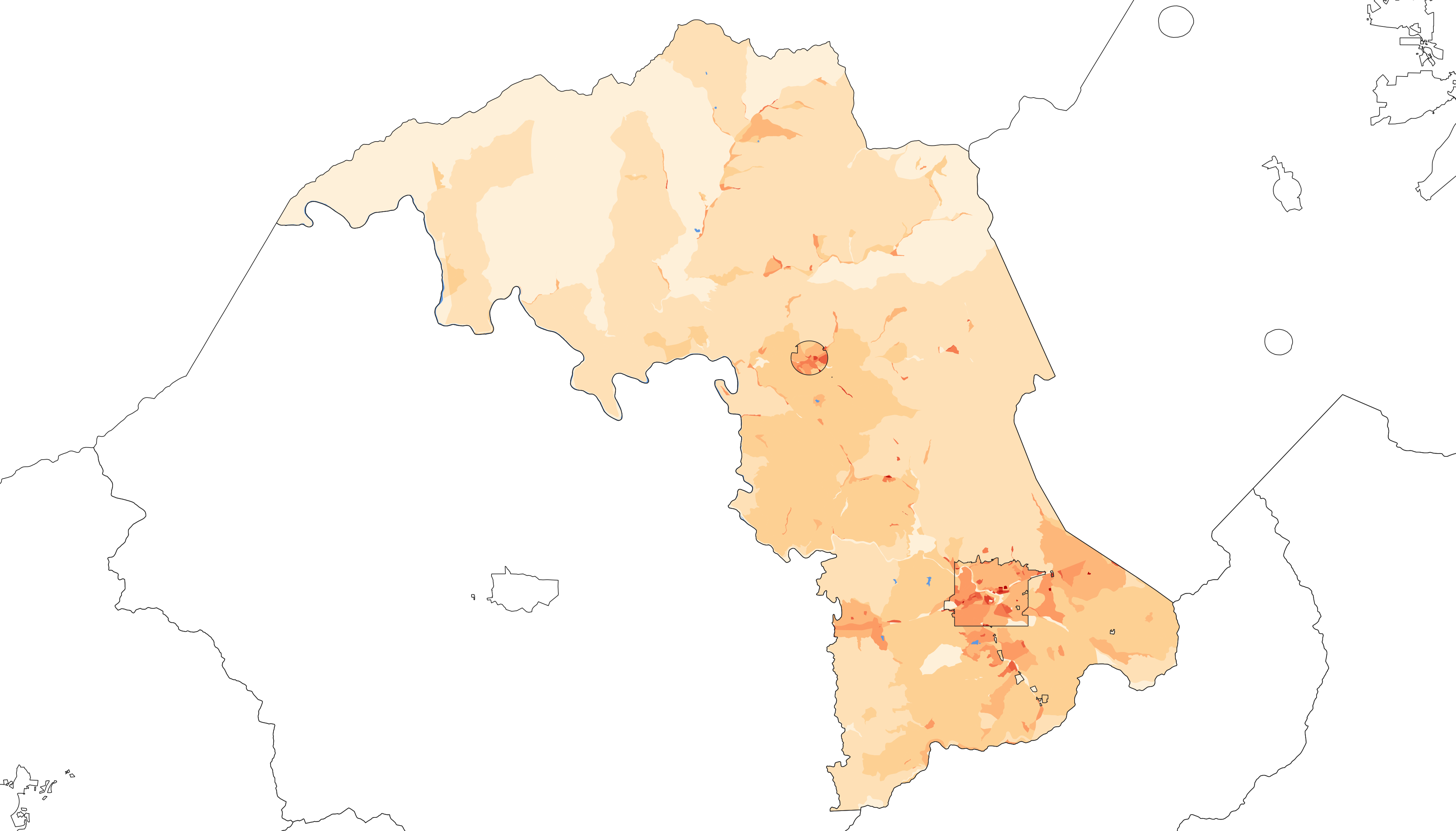
2020 population density of Mitchell County NC by census block

=== Racial and ethnic composition ===
Mitchell County, North Carolina – Racial and ethnic composition Note: the US Census treats Hispanic/Latino as an ethnic category. This table excludes Latinos from the racial categories and assigns them to a separate category. Hispanics/Latinos may be of any race.
Race / Ethnicity (NH = Non-Hispanic)	Pop 1980	Pop 1990	Pop 2000	Pop 2010	Pop 2020	% 1980	% 1990	% 2000	% 2010	% 2020
White alone (NH)	14,277	14,324	15,210	14,656	13,514	98.95%	99.24%	96.96%	94.08%	90.68%
Black or African American alone (NH)	18	23	33	53	50	0.12%	0.16%	0.21%	0.34%	0.34%
Native American or Alaska Native alone (NH)	21	19	23	36	30	0.15%	0.13%	0.15%	0.23%	0.20%
Asian alone (NH)	23	17	32	46	52	0.16%	0.12%	0.20%	0.30%	0.35%
Native Hawaiian or Pacific Islander alone (NH)	x	x	0	1	1	x	x	0.00%	0.01%	0.01%
Other race alone (NH)	8	0	3	9	0	0.06%	0.00%	0.02%	0.06%	0.00%
Mixed race or Multiracial (NH)	x	x	75	147	555	x	x	0.48%	0.94%	3.72%
Hispanic or Latino (any race)	81	50	311	631	701	0.56%	0.35%	1.98%	4.05%	4.70%
Total	14,428	14,433	15,687	15,579	14,903	100.00%	100.00%	100.00%	100.00%	100.00%

=== 2020 census ===
As of the 2020 census, there were 14,903 people, 6,612 households, and 4,031 families residing in the county. The median age was 49.3 years, with 17.8% of residents under the age of 18 and 26.0% aged 65 or older.

For every 100 females there were 94.3 males, and for every 100 females age 18 and over there were 92.4 males age 18 and over.

The racial makeup of the county was 91.7% White, 0.4% Black or African American, 0.2% American Indian and Alaska Native, 0.4% Asian, <0.1% Native Hawaiian and Pacific Islander, 2.4% from some other race, and 5.0% from two or more races. Hispanic or Latino residents of any race comprised 4.7% of the population.

<0.1% of residents lived in urban areas, while 100.0% lived in rural areas.

There were 6,612 households in the county, of which 23.3% had children under the age of 18 living in them. Of all households, 50.9% were married-couple households, 17.7% were households with a male householder and no spouse or partner present, and 26.8% were households with a female householder and no spouse or partner present. About 30.1% of all households were made up of individuals and 16.0% had someone living alone who was 65 years of age or older.

There were 8,638 housing units, of which 23.5% were vacant. Among occupied housing units, 76.0% were owner-occupied and 24.0% were renter-occupied. The homeowner vacancy rate was 2.3% and the rental vacancy rate was 9.8%.

=== 2000 census ===
At the 2000 census, there were 15,687 people, 6,551 households, and 4,736 families residing in the county. The population density was 71 people per square mile (27 people/km^{2}). There were 7,919 housing units at an average density of 36 units per square mile (14 units/km^{2}). The racial makeup of the county was 97.87% White, 0.22% Black or African American, 0.45% Native American, 0.20% Asian, 0.66% from other races, and 0.60% from two or more races. 1.98% of the population were Hispanic or Latino of any race.

There were 6,551 households, out of which 27.40% had children under the age of 18 living with them, 60.90% were married couples living together, 8.10% had a female householder with no husband present, and 27.70% were non-families. 25.20% of all households were made up of individuals, and 12.00% had someone living alone who was 65 years of age or older. The average household size was 2.37 and the average family size was 2.82.

In the county, the population was spread out, with 21.20% under the age of 18, 6.80% from 18 to 24, 26.40% from 25 to 44, 27.10% from 45 to 64, and 18.60% who were 65 years of age or older. The median age was 42 years. For every 100 females there were 95.60 males. For every 100 females age 18 and over, there were 92.30 males.

The median income for a household in the county was $30,508, and the median income for a family was $36,367. Males had a median income of $26,550 versus $20,905 for females. The per capita income for the county was $15,933. About 10.70% of families and 13.80% of the population were below the poverty line, including 17.20% of those under age 18 and 16.40% of those age 65 or over.

=== Ancestry ===
As of 2015, the largest self-reported ancestry groups in Mitchell County were:

Ancestry	Percent (2015)
American (United States)	17.3%
English (England)	14.7%
German (Germany)	12.2%
Irish (Republic of Ireland)	11.9%
Scotch-Irish (Ulster)	9.8%
Scottish (Scotland)	5.0%
French (except Basque) (France)	2.3%
Italian (Italy)	1.9%
Swedish (Sweden)	1.6%
Dutch (Netherlands)	1.5%

== Law and government ==
Mitchell County is a member of the regional High Country Council of Governments.

=== Politics ===
Owing to its Civil War-era Unionist sympathies, along with its rural character, Mitchell has continuously been an overwhelmingly Republican county, even during the "Solid South" Democratic era. No Democratic presidential candidate has carried Mitchell County since Samuel J. Tilden in 1876. Since Tilden's win, every Republican candidate has obtained at least sixty percent of the county's vote, with the solitary exception of the 1912 election when the party was divided between the two candidacies of William Howard Taft and Theodore Roosevelt, the latter of whom carried the county.

As of October 2022, 58 percent of active voters in Mitchell County are registered Republicans—the highest such rate statewide—while Democrats have their lowest county registration rate.

United States presidential election results for Mitchell County, North Carolina
Year	Republican		Democratic		Third party(ies)	
Year	No.	%	No.	%	No.	%
1912	203	15.57%	385	29.52%	716	54.91%
1916	1,298	73.75%	462	26.25%	0	0.00%
1920	2,153	75.54%	697	24.46%	0	0.00%
1924	1,540	68.84%	689	30.80%	8	0.36%
1928	3,436	80.60%	827	19.40%	0	0.00%
1932	3,798	68.06%	1,773	31.77%	9	0.16%
1936	3,380	66.71%	1,687	33.29%	0	0.00%
1940	3,290	69.41%	1,450	30.59%	0	0.00%
1944	3,192	75.71%	1,024	24.29%	0	0.00%
1948	2,908	76.35%	818	21.48%	83	2.18%
1952	4,009	76.43%	1,236	23.57%	0	0.00%
1956	4,269	79.97%	1,069	20.03%	0	0.00%
1960	4,831	80.45%	1,174	19.55%	0	0.00%
1964	3,263	65.27%	1,736	34.73%	0	0.00%
1968	3,778	72.65%	819	15.75%	603	11.60%
1972	4,240	83.45%	800	15.74%	41	0.81%
1976	3,728	64.50%	2,031	35.14%	21	0.36%
1980	4,322	68.93%	1,765	28.15%	183	2.92%
1984	4,737	78.51%	1,286	21.31%	11	0.18%
1988	4,620	76.82%	1,377	22.90%	17	0.28%
1992	4,405	62.79%	1,727	24.62%	883	12.59%
1996	3,874	65.15%	1,496	25.16%	576	9.69%
2000	4,984	75.52%	1,535	23.26%	81	1.23%
2004	5,686	72.92%	2,080	26.67%	32	0.41%
2008	5,499	70.09%	2,238	28.52%	109	1.39%
2012	5,806	74.77%	1,838	23.67%	121	1.56%
2016	6,282	77.59%	1,596	19.71%	218	2.69%
2020	7,090	78.42%	1,867	20.65%	84	0.93%
2024	6,843	77.39%	1,915	21.66%	84	0.95%

==== 2016 presidential primaries ====
In the 2016 Republican Primary in Mitchell County, Donald Trump received 1,775 votes (or 46.8 percent of the total votes) followed by Ted Cruz who came in second with 1,188 votes (or 31.3% of the total votes). In the 2016 Democratic Primary, Bernie Sanders received 450 votes (57.9% of the total) whereas Hillary Clinton only won 314 votes (40.4% of the total). In the general election Donald Trump received 6,282 votes (or 77.6% of the total vote) whereas Hillary Clinton only received 1,596 votes (19.7% of the vote) and Libertarian Candidate Gary Johnson only received 138 votes (1.7% of total votes in the county).

== Economy ==
The Mitchell County Economic Development Commission (EDC) is a nine-member board with representatives from various business, education, and government sectors in the county. The goal of the board is to promote the establishment, development, and retention of businesses in Mitchell County.

Top 10 employers ranked largest to smallest:

1. Mitchell County Board of Education
2. Sibelco North America, Inc.
3. Blue Ridge Medical Center, Lllp.
4. Walmart Associates, Inc.
5. Mayland Community College
6. Mitchell County Government
7. Hospice of the Blue Ridge
8. Ingles Markets, Inc.
9. Bombardier Motor Corp of America (BRP)
10. The Quartz Corp USA

== Education ==
Mitchell High School is a comprehensive four-year high school (9–12) centrally located in the community of Ledger when built in 1978.

Spruce Pine is home to three schools: Greenlee Primary (K-2), Deyton Elementary (3–5), and Harris Middle (6–8). Bakersville is home to two schools: Gouge Primary (K-4) and Bowman Middle (5–8).

Mayland Community College also calls Mitchell County home. Founded by an act of the North Carolina General Assembly in 1971, Mayland hosts some 35 curriculum programs and provides vocational and technical training, along with college transfer opportunities to residents of the region.

Penland School of Crafts is an educational facility located in the Penland Community. It is designed to educate students who will apply workable knowledge in creation of books, paper, clay, drawing, glass, iron, metals, photography, printmaking and letterpress, textiles, and wood. The school was established in the early 1920s, it is the largest and oldest professional crafts school in the United States.

== Media ==
The county is served by The Mitchell News-Journal, a weekly newspaper printed by Community Newspapers, Inc. and WTOE radio, at 1470 kHz on the AM dial to cover local news.

== Communities ==
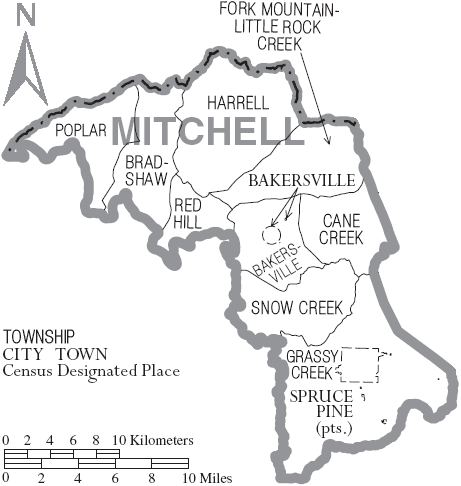
Map of Mitchell County with municipal and township labels

=== Towns ===
- Bakersville (county seat)
- Spruce Pine (largest community)

=== Townships ===
- Bakersville
- Bradshaw
- Cane Creek
- Fork Mountain-Little Rock Creek
- Grassy Creek
- Harrell
- Poplar
- Red Hill
- Snow Creek
- Spruce Pine

=== Unincorporated communities ===
- Bailey Settlement
- Bandana
- Buladean
- Clarrissa
- Estatoe
- Hawk
- Kona
- Ledger
- Little Switzerland (also in McDowell County)
- Loafers Glory
- Penland
- Poplar
- Red Hill
- Tipton Hill
- Toecane

== See also ==
- List of counties in North Carolina
- List of sundown towns in the United States
- National Register of Historic Places listings in Mitchell County, North Carolina
