= Roan Mountain State Park =

Coordinates: 36°10′08″N 82°06′03″W

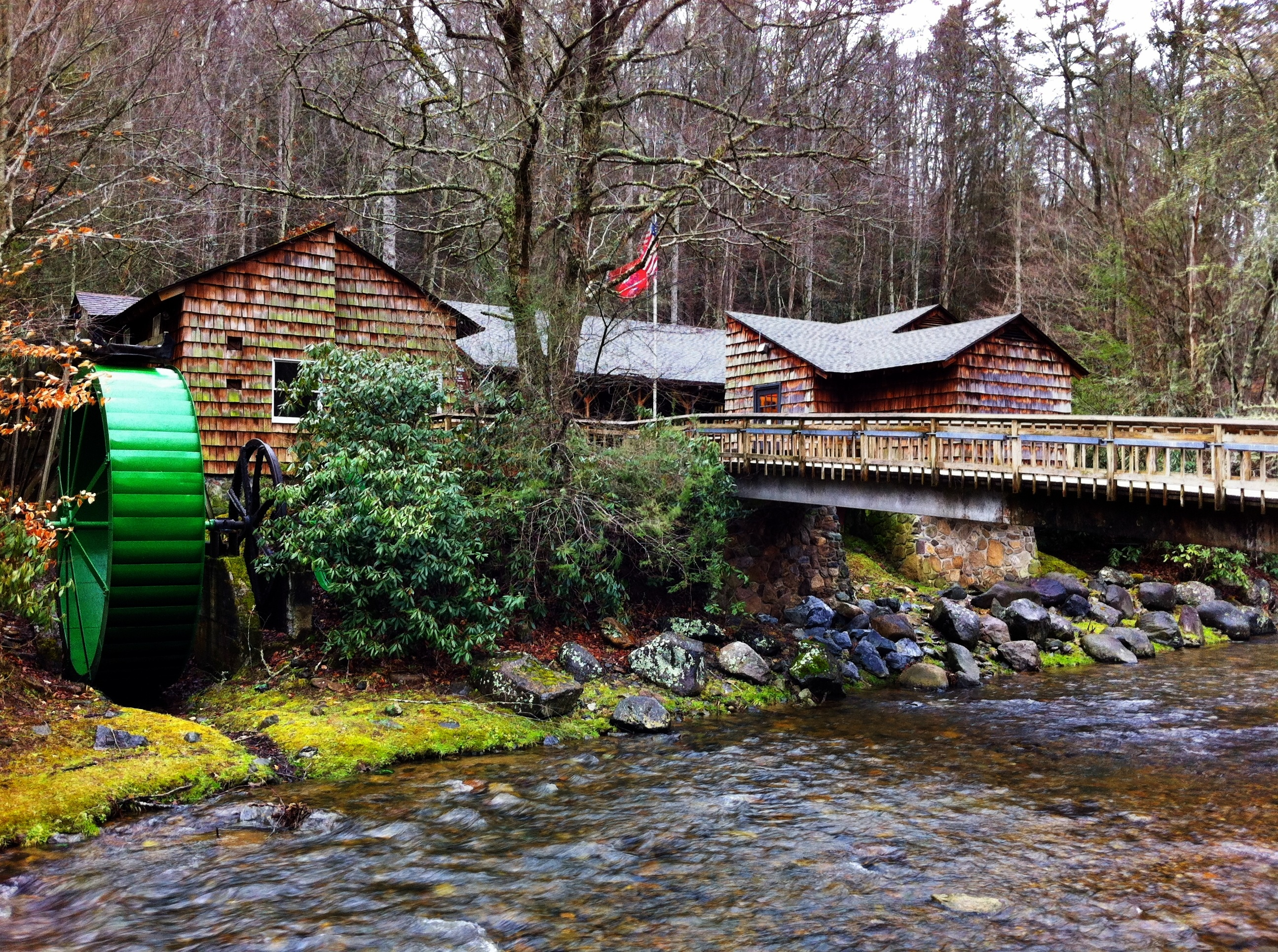
- Roan Mountain State Park Visitor Center
- Interactive map of Roan Mountain State Park
- Type: Tennessee State Park
- Location: Roan Mountain, Tennessee
- Area: 2,006 acres (8.12 km^{2})
- Operator: Tennessee Department of Environment and Conservation
- Open: Year Around
- Website: Roan Mountain State Park

Map spot location of Roan Mountain State Park

Roan Mountain State Park is a Tennessee state park in Carter County, in Northeast Tennessee. It is close to the Tennessee-North Carolina border and near the community of Roan Mountain, Tennessee. Situated in the Blue Ridge of the Appalachian Mountains, the park preserves 2,006 acres (8.12 km^{2}) of mostly hardwood forest. The park is in close proximity to 6,285-foot (1,916 m) Roan Mountain and the Appalachian Trail, both of which are owned and managed by the US Forest Service. On exceptionally clear days, the Charlotte skyline can be photographed from the peak. Most of the town of Roan Mountain is privately owned by the residents, and much of the land in Roan Mountain has been family owned for many generations, being passed down generation after generation through the years.

== Activities ==
Roan Mountain State Park hosts a variety of outdoor activities including hiking, mountain biking, camping, cross-country skiing (during snowy, winter months), fishing, and swimming. A heated swimming pool is open from Memorial Day to mid-August. At an elevation of 2,972 feet (906 m), the outdoor swimming pool is at the highest elevation of any swimming pool within the Tennessee State Park System. Other attractions include the historic Miller homestead and the Roan Mountain Rhododendron Festival. The festival celebrates the blooming of the world's largest natural rhododendron garden, and it is held in the park annually, during the peak of the alpine catawba rhododendron bloom in late June.

== Amenities ==
Roan Mountain State Park has a 107-site campground for tents, trailers, and RVs, as well as 30 rental cabins available by reservation. A modern meeting facility is also available for rent, by advance reservation. Picnicking is also available in the park. There are three picnic pavilions.

== Miller Farmstead ==
- Miller Farmstead
- U.S. National Register of Historic Places
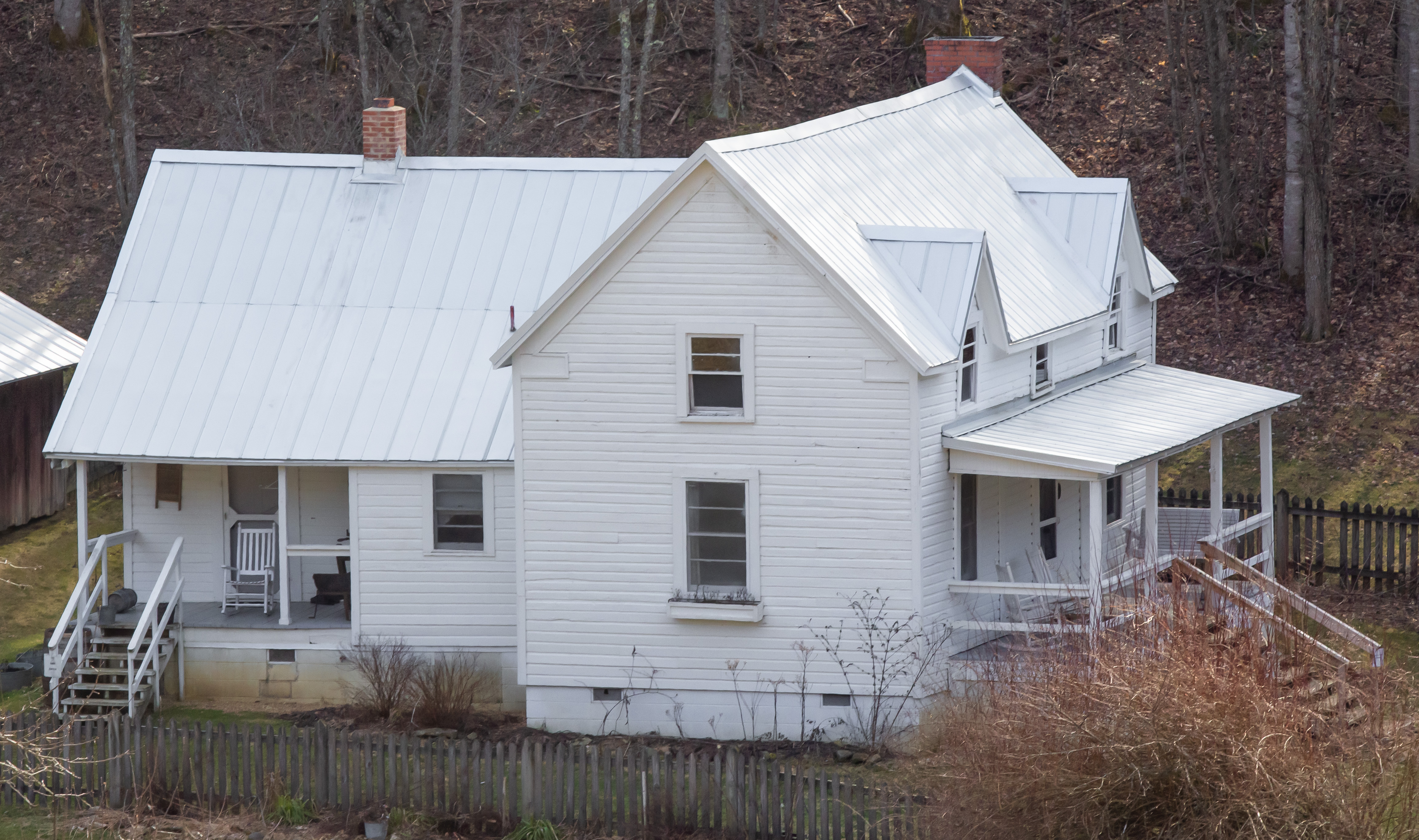
- Location: Roan Mountain State Park, Roan Mountain, Tennessee
- Built: 1870–1910
- NRHP reference No.: 14000449
- Added to NRHP: July 25, 2014

Miller Farmstead is a historic farmstead located in the park. It was listed on the National Register of Historic Places on July 25, 2014.

The farm was settled in 1870 and the house was built in either 1908 or 1910.

The farmstead includes the home, a barn, a chicken coop, and several other contributing structures. The Miller Family Cemetery is also located on the farm.

== Nearby state parks ==
The following state parks are within 30 miles (48 km) of Roan Mountain State Park:

Elk Knob State Park, North Carolina
Grandfather Mountain State Park, North Carolina
Lake James State Park, North Carolina
Lamar Alexander Rocky Fork State Park
Mount Mitchell State Park, North Carolina
Sycamore Shoals State Park
