= National Register of Historic Places listings in Yancey County, North Carolina =

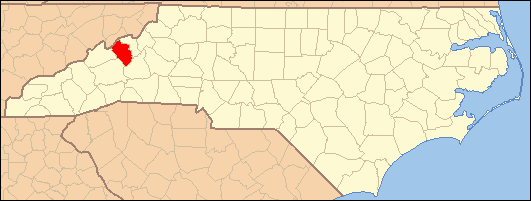

This list includes properties and districts listed on the National Register of Historic Places in Yancey County, North Carolina. Click the "Map of all coordinates" link to the right to view an online map of all properties and districts with latitude and longitude coordinates in the table below.

== Current listings ==
This National Park Service list is complete through NPS recent listings posted May 1, 2026.

	Name on the Register	Image	Date listed	Location	City or town	Description
1	Bald Creek Historic District	Bald Creek Historic District	January 29, 2009 (#08001391)	Both sides of Bald Creek School Rd., 76-239 Pleasant Valley Rd., and 6193-6195 US 19E; 35°54′45″N 82°25′22″W	Burnsville	
2	Blue Ridge Parkway	Blue Ridge Parkway	December 13, 2024 (#100011353)	Blue Ridge Parkway through Virginia and North Carolina; 35°47′09″N 82°10′05″W	Burnsville vicinity	
3	David M. Buck House		April 25, 2001 (#01000420)	NC 1395, 1.1 miles SW of jct with NC 1401; 35°57′52″N 82°28′24″W	Bald Mountain	
4	Chase-Coletta House		June 16, 2004 (#04000605)	108 Town Sq. 35°55′00″N 82°17′56″W	Burnsville	
5	Citizens Bank Building	Citizens Bank Building	March 29, 1990 (#90000545)	Town Sq. 35°55′00″N 82°18′00″W	Burnsville	
6	John Wesley McElroy House	John Wesley McElroy House	November 29, 1990 (#90001802)	11 Academy St. 35°55′04″N 82°18′05″W	Burnsville	Houses the Rush Wray Museum of Yancey County History
7	Nu Wray Inn	Nu Wray Inn	April 15, 1982 (#82003535)	Off US 19E; 35°55′00″N 82°17′58″W	Burnsville	
8	Yancey Collegiate Institute Historic District	Yancey Collegiate Institute Historic District	August 21, 2003 (#03000799)	School Dr. and Green Mountain Dr. 35°55′18″N 82°17′39″W	Burnsville	
9	Yancey County Courthouse	Yancey County Courthouse	May 10, 1979 (#79001767)	W. Main at Town Square; 35°55′01″N 82°18′02″W	Burnsville	

== See also ==
- National Register of Historic Places listings in North Carolina
- List of National Historic Landmarks in North Carolina
