= Yancey Railroad =

Railway line in North Carolina, United States

Overview
- Headquarters: Burnsville, North Carolina
- Reporting mark: YAN
- Locale: Yancey County, Western North Carolina
- Dates of operation: 1955–1982
- Predecessor: Black Mountain Railway (subsidiary of the Clinchfield Railroad)

Technical
- Track gauge: 4 ft 8 1/2 in (1435 mm) (standard gauge)
- Length: 12.83 miles (20.65 km)

The Yancey Railroad (reporting mark YAN) was an American Class III shortline railroad that operated for freight service from a connection with the Clinchfield Railroad at Kona, North Carolina, through Micaville, to Burnsville, 10.6 miles (17.1 km). A short branch ran from Micaville to Bowditch, North Carolina, 2.11 miles (3.40 km). Total mileage was 12.83 miles (20.65 km). Rail was 60–65 pounds and the maximum load limit was 75 tons. Traffic was feldspar, mica, fertilizer, building materials, livestock feed and steel spring wire.

== History of the Black Mountain Railway ==
The line was built in 1907 as the Black Mountain Railway, an 8-mile (13 km) standard-gauge line running from Kona, where it connected with the South and Western Railroad (a predecessor of the Clinchfield), to Bowditch, where a band mill was built to process lumber. The Black Mountain Ry. was extended from Micaville to Burnsville by 1912 and on to Pensacola, Murchison, and Eskota, with a short 2-mile (3.2 km) logging spur built from near Burnsville to Athlone in 1913 to tap the area's lumber reserves. The Micaville-Eskota line was envisioned as part of a longer through route to Asheville, North Carolina, 40 miles (64 km) south of Eskota, which would allow the Black Mountain Railway to break the monopoly held by the Southern Railway in that area.

Financing for part of the construction came from the Scutte-Lambert Lumber Company for $40,000 in notes, which had pledged the notes to the Holston Corporation (which later acquired control of the South and Western, renaming it the Carolina, Clinchfield and Ohio Railway). When the notes defaulted in 1913, Holston took over the railroad's notes, passing control of it to the Clinchfield, but retaining the Black Mountain Railway name as a subsidiary. While the line was never extended to Asheville, the railroad became profitable for the Clinchfield during World War I into the mid 1920s.

Two other short spurs were built off the Burnsville-Micaville section of the Black Mountain Ry. during the 1920s. One, following George's Fork Creek just east of the community of Windom southward for 2 miles (3.2 km) into the Black Mountains, was built by the Tennessee Eastman Corporation in 1923 and was used to haul timber for 2 years, until 1925, when it was removed. The other line, at 1.5 miles (2.4 km) in length, followed Cane Branch Creek from a point just west of Micaville south to a feldspar crusher on the eastern slope of the Black Mountains. This was removed by the early 1930s.

By 1926, the timber reserves west of Burnsville began to be played out, causing the decision by the Black Mountain Ry. to abandon all trackage west of Burnsville to Eskota. The former railroad's grade between those points was then used to construct part of North Carolina Highway 197. From Burnsville east, as well as from Bowditch to Micaville, the Black Mountain Railway continued to haul feldspar, lumber, and general commodities.

== History of the Yancey Railroad ==
Although the Black Mountain Railway had managed to limp through the Great Depression and World War II, traffic had declined to the point that, by 1951 the railroad's parent, the Clinchfield, had wished itself to cease paying the interest on the original $40,000.00 in notes. The Black Mountain Railway applied for abandonment of all of its remaining trackage through the Interstate Commerce Commission. The ICC granted the request in 1954 on the provision that the line was offered for sale to an individual or a group of locals from Yancey County.

As the news of the potential abandonment was made known, citizens begin a fundraising drive to sell common stock in order to raise $70,000 for the purchase of the railroad as well as a new diesel locomotive to operate over the line. The group was successful, and in 1954, paid $22,000 to the Clinchfield for the remaining trackage of the Black Mountain Railway.

The railroad was renamed the Yancey Railroad and began operations on April 1, 1955, using a GE 45-ton switcher diesel locomotive built new for the Yancey in March 1955 at GE's locomotive plant in Erie, Pennsylvania as builder number 32344 at a cost of $44,000. The locomotive was numbered 1 and was given the nicknamed "Blackie" by the crews of the railroad due to her factory black paint job. Number 1 was driven by a sprocket and chain drive and produced 300 horsepower. When not in use, Yancey number 1 was stored at Burnsville in a small insulated engine shed that was built on a section of the former right of way toward Eskota, near the line's depot which served as the railroad's headquarters.

Included with the purchase of the railroad was a former wooden boxcar that was remodeled to serve as a caboose/mail/baggage car for the Black Mountain Railway. After it was acquired by the Yancey, the car was turned into a work flat for maintenance of way service.

Traffic begin to grow to the point that in 1964, the Yancey had acquired a second diesel locomotive, a GE 50-ton switcher built new in March 1941 at GE's Schenectady, New York locomotive plant for the US Navy as 65-0098, carrying the builder's number 12984. This locomotive was propelled by side rods (rods mounted on the side of the locomotive's trucks in order to turn the wheels so that the locomotive can gain traction) and produced 300 horsepower (220 kW) as well. The Yancey numbered the locomotive 2 and nicknamed it "Puddles" as, according to former Yancey president Bill Cannon, "it had a tendency to waddle along the tracks without falling into a puddle". Number 2 was usually stored in an identical small enginehouse to the one at Burnsville at the end of the line to Bowditch.

For a brief time in 1968, the Yancey Railroad offered steam trips between Micaville and Kona using a former Brooklyn Eastern District Terminal Railroad 0-6-0T oil-fired steam engine #15 and two steel coaches lettered "Southern Appalachian Railway". This operation was not successful and the equipment was stored in Burnsville for several years before being sold. The 0-6-0T operates today as a Thomas The Tank engine after being cosmetically altered by the Strasburg Rail Road.

The Yancey Railroad continued to show a modest profit each year, until 1971 when the Feldspar Corporation closed its plant at Bowditch, resulting in the loss of 36,000 tons of feldspar shipped annually. The following year, heavy rains caused by Hurricane Agnes washed several small bridges and culverts along the line. Both locomotives were stored at different points on the railroad, which made it easier to restore service in seven weeks. The Yancey continued to operate on a shoestring.

In August 1976, The Yancey purchased a secondhand GE 65-ton switcher, numbered 3. Number 1 was then sold to the Sigri Great Lakes Carbon facility in Morganton, North Carolina as an industrial switcher. To increase revenue, the railroad began storing boxcars (mostly National Railway Utilization cars lettered for the Pickens Railroad) on the line from Micaville to Bowditch. More flooding in 1977 damaged sections of the track in spots as well as weakened the piers and pilings on the bridge over the North Toe River. This resulted in the loss of much of the Yancey's remaining freight customers.

The number 3 was sold off by 1980 to Centex (now PulteGroup) and a former Narragansett Pier Railroad Vulcan Iron Works 65-ton locomotive was purchased. This unit was built for the US Navy in 1943 and was sold to the Narragansett Pier in 1963 as their number 40. This unit was acquired by the Yancey in 1981 shortly after the Narragansett Pier ceased operations and was used for a brief time before all operations on the Yancey shut down in late 1982. Most of the remaining equipment was taken off the railroad by the summer of 1984 (which included the scrapping of GE 45-ton locomotive #2), while the remaining assets were auctioned off in May 1985.

== See also ==
- Burnsville, North Carolina
- Micaville, North Carolina
