= Frankie Stewart Silver =

American murderer (1814/15–1833)

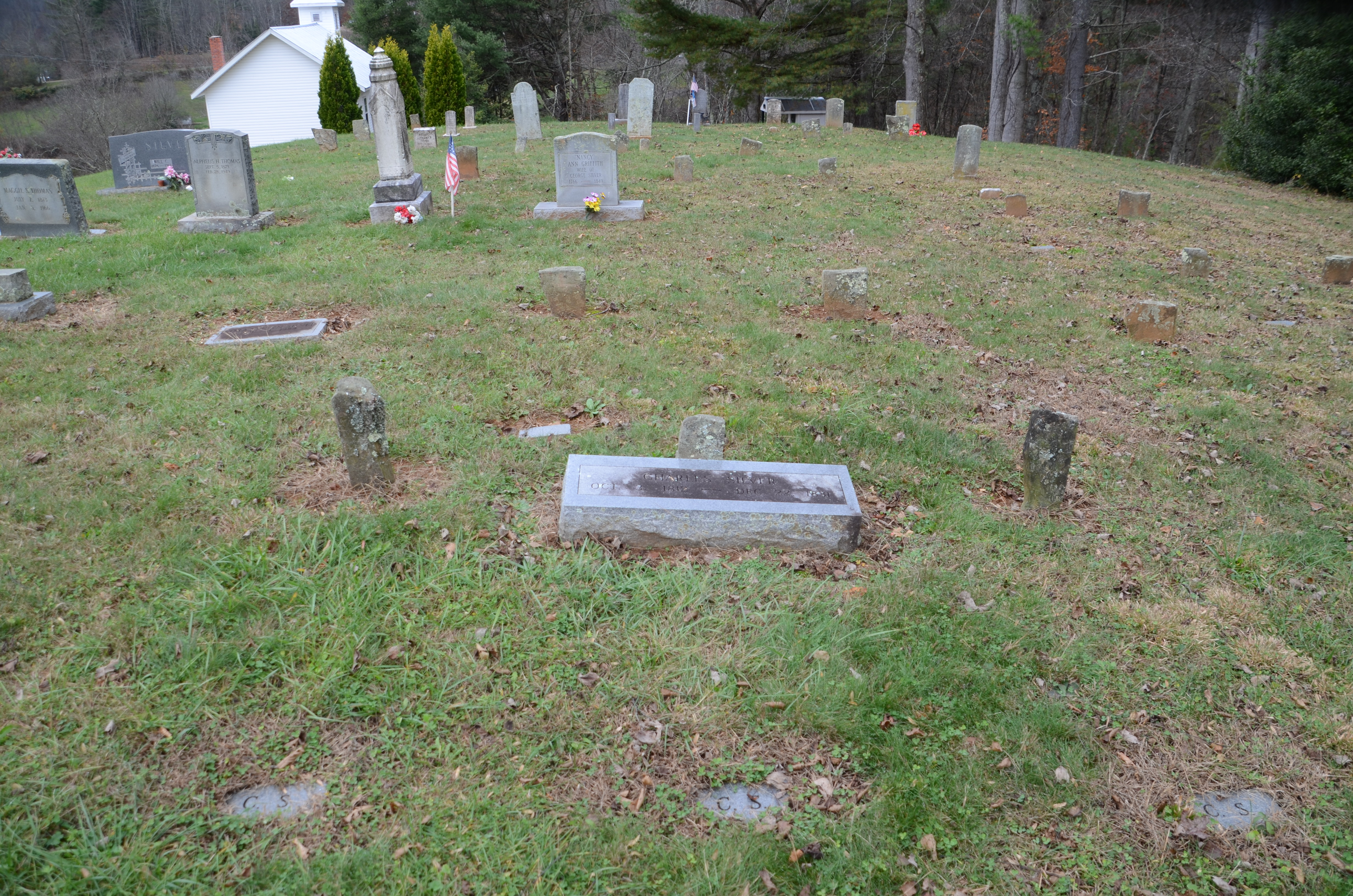
The grave of Charles Silver in Kona, North Carolina.

Frances Stewart Silver (born 1814 or 1815; died July 12, 1833) was hanged in Morganton, Burke County, North Carolina for the axe murder of her husband Charles Silver. Frankie Silver, as she was known, is believed to have been the first white woman executed in North Carolina.

== Early life ==
She was born Frances Stewart, the daughter of Isaiah and Barbara (née Howell) Stewart. The family moved to Burke County when Frankie was young, around 1820. They lived in the town of Kona near the home of Jacob Silver who had lost his wife Elizabeth in childbirth. His son Charlie Silver was a year older than Frankie. Charlie and Frankie married and initially seemed a good pair. On 3 November 1830 their first daughter, Nancy, was born. They lived in a wooden cabin on land gifted by Jacob Silver.

== Murder ==
On December 22, 1831, Charles Silver (sometimes referred to as “Johnny Silver”) was killed in his cabin in Burke County, North Carolina. Contemporary reports confirm that he was struck with an axe and that his body was burned in the fireplace. Neighbors, suspicious after Charles failed to return from a hunting trip, discovered bloodstains on the floor and human bones in the hearth.

According to later family lore, parts of the body were also concealed beneath the floorboards. However, a sworn statement published in the Southern Citizen in 1837—presented as Frankie Silver’s own confession—explicitly denied this, insisting that she “rolled him into the fire, whole as he was… and did not cut him in any way at all.”

While the exact circumstances remain debated, it is clear from both court records and press accounts that Charles Silver was the victim of a fatal axe blow and that his remains were partially consumed in the fireplace.

== Arrest and trial ==
Shortly after the murder, suspicion fell on Charles’s wife Frankie, her mother, Barbara Stewart, and her brother, Blackston (or “Blackstone”) Stewart. All three were arrested and brought before a magistrate in 1832. Barbara and Blackston pled not guilty and were discharged, while Frankie alone was indicted for murder and remained in custody.

A lesser-known account, published in the Southern Citizen (Asheboro, NC) on February 25, 1837, preserves what it describes as Frankie Silver’s sworn confession, given in Burke County jail on May 23, 1833, and witnessed by attorney William Casper Bevens and Deputy Sheriff Thomas Wilson. In this statement, Silver described repeated abuse by her husband, Charles Silver, and said the killing occurred in a moment of fear and fury rather than premeditation. Several newspapers reporting her execution in July 1833 quoted passages consistent with this confession, suggesting the account likely circulated earlier in now-unrecovered issues.

Frankie’s trial began on March 29, 1832. The evidence against her—bloodstains, remains found in the fireplace, and neighbors’ testimony—was circumstantial by modern standards. The jury initially struggled to reach a verdict, but after further instruction from the judge they returned a guilty verdict, and she was sentenced to death.

== Interpretations ==
Accounts of the Silver case have long been divided. Some later writers interpreted Frankie as having involved family members in the crime, while others have argued she was a battered wife who killed her husband in self-defense during one of his beatings. The exact circumstances inside the Silver cabin on the night of December 22, 1831, remain uncertain.

Contemporaneous reports and later petitions suggest that many in the community believed Frankie had been abused by her husband. A petition signed by townspeople, including neighbors and members of her late husband Charlie Silver's family—including several members of the all-male jury that convicted her—was submitted to Governor Montfort Stokes requesting clemency, but it was denied.

Legends around her execution added to the mystery. One story, later to be found inaccurate, holds that as she was asked for final words on the gallows, her father called out, “Die with it in you, Frankie!” Some interpreted this to mean that other family members were involved in the killing of Charles Silver. The family’s later attempt to help Frankie escape custody reinforced these suspicions for some observers.

== Escape, Recapture, Execution, and Burial ==
While awaiting execution, Frankie Silver escaped from the Burke County jail with outside help. Someone entered through a basement window and, using false keys, opened the doors leading to her quarters.

She was recaptured about a week later in Rutherford County, walking behind her father’s wagon. Disguised in men’s clothing with her hair cut short, she was recognized by the pursuing posse. Her father and uncle were arrested and jailed as accessories to the escape.

Folklore later embellished the story, claiming that she had hidden in a hay wagon and attempted to pass herself off as “Tommy,” until a slip of the tongue by her uncle revealed her identity. This anecdote has circulated widely in local tradition but is not confirmed by contemporary records.

Frankie was executed by hanging in Morganton on Friday, July 12, 1833 at Damon's Hill, located off present-day Valdese Avenue. Her father reportedly intended to bring her body home for burial in the family plot, but the summer heat forced a hasty interment in an unmarked grave behind the Buckhorn Tavern, a few miles west of Morganton. For many years the exact location was uncertain; it is now believed to be on private property along Buckhorn Tavern Road.

In 1952, Beatrice Cobb, editor of the Morganton News Herald, arranged for a granite stone to be placed near the site. The marker misspells Frankie’s married name as “Silvers.”

== Popular culture ==
- The popular song "Frankie and Johnny" is theorized to have been inspired by Frankie Silver's crime.
- As a young college student in September 1963, author Perry Deane Young discovered the letters and petitions to the governor which turned upside down the traditional story of a jealous wife seeking her revenge. Thus began a lifelong crusade by Young to show through documentation that Frankie Silver was unjustly hanged. At the height of the Watergate hearings, Sen. Sam Ervin wrote to Young to concur that Frankie should never have been hanged. Young's book, The Untold Story of Frankie Silver, reproduced all of the documents which proved Frankie's innocence. His later play, Frankie, fictitiously gave the long-dead woman a chance to tell her side of the story. These accounts are known to be controversial, especially among descendants of the Silver family, who claim that "there were no documents to ever officially exist as this author suggests."
- The case of Frankie Silver served as the basis of Sharyn McCrumb's 1999 novel, The Ballad of Frankie Silver. In it, McCrumb's series character Spencer Arrowood takes a fresh look at the Frankie Silver case and at a (fictional) modern murder with many parallels.
- The 2000 film The Ballad of Frankie Silver and its re-release in 2010 as The Ballad of Frankie Silver:(Special Edition) DVD was written, directed, and produced by Theresa E. Phillips of Legacy Films Ltd. This film presents an alternative theory of the crime.
- In a 2013 episode of the Investigation Discovery show Deadly Women, Frankie Stewart Silver appears. The episode was titled "Brides of Blood."
- A petition to have Frankie officially pardoned for the murder was formed unsuccessfully on April 9, 2013.
- In 2016 Parkway Playhouse in Burnsville, North Carolina adapted Sharyn McCrumb's book into a stage show.
- In 2025, Dalton Walters, a local writer and historian from Morganton, North Carolina, published a newly transcribed 1837 account of Silver’s confession and formally petitioned Governor Josh Stein for a posthumous pardon. The request is currently under consideration.

== Bibliography ==
- The Ballad of Frankie Silver, by Sharyn McCrumb (ISBN 0-451-19739-9)
- The Untold Story of Frankie Silver, by Perry Deane Young (ISBN 0-595-37725-4)
- Roaming the Mountains, by John Paris (LCCCN 55-12508)
- The Ballad of Frankie Silver:(Special Edition) DVD by Legacy Films Ltd.
- The Ballad of Frankie Silver: As told by Bobby McMillon in Folkstreams film

http://www.folkstreams.net/film-detail.php?id=96
