= Yancey County News =

Former American newspaper

- Type: Weekly newspaper
- Owner(s): Jonathan and Susan Austin
- Founded: January 2011
- Ceased publication: Summer 2014
- City: Burnsville, North Carolina
- Circulation: 1,000-1,300

The Yancey County News was a weekly newspaper in Burnsville, North Carolina, serving Yancey County. In operation from 2011 to 2014, it was owned and operated by Jonathan and Susan Austin.

== History ==
The Yancey County News was started in January 2011 by the husband and wife team; Jonathan Austin had 30 years of journalism experience and had dreamed of starting a newspaper in his father's adopted mountain town. The paper covered Yancey County, North Carolina, which had for years been served by a local paper that didn't rock the boat. Its paid circulation was between 1,000 and 1,300; the cost of a print copy was 50 cents.

Jonathan said that his intent with the newspaper was to bring "the attitude of well-funded reporting" to a small-town paper while also covering all local events. The paper covered government meetings, local sports, and also published nutrition and hunting columns. In two series of investigative reports beginning with its first issue and titled "Unlawful Law Enforcement", the newspaper reported criminal abuses of absentee balloting and vote fraud organized by staff at the sheriff's department. The paper also documented that county-owned firearms were being pawned by the chief deputy, who later resigned and pleaded guilty to dereliction of duty.

The Yancey County News received two major American journalism awards for its work in 2011: the E.W. Scripps Award for Distinguished Service to the First Amendment and the 2012 Ancil Payne Award for Ethics in Journalism from the University of Oregon School of Journalism and Communication. In November 2012 it was also awarded the Tom and Pat Gish Award for courage, integrity and tenacity by the Institute for Rural Journalism and Community Issues at the University of Kentucky.

The newspaper closed in summer 2014 after a local grocery store withdrew its advertising.
