= Mountain Heritage High School =

American public school in North Carolina

Location
- 333 Mountain Heritage High School Rd; Burnsville, North Carolina; United States; 35°54′31″N 82°20′00″W

Information
- Type: Public
- Motto: Learning for Life
- Established: 1976 (50 years ago)
- School district: Yancey County Schools
- CEEB code: 340525
- Principal: Daron Williams
- Teaching staff: 46.52 (FTE)
- Grades: 9–12
- Enrollment: 633 (2023-2024)
- Student to teacher ratio: 13.61
- Colors: Green, black, and white
- Athletics: Conference 42
- Nickname: Cougars
- Rival: Mitchell High School
- Newspaper: Heritage Highlight
- Yearbook: The Trillium
- Feeder schools: East Yancey Middle School, Cane River Middle School
- Website: mhhs.yanceync.net

Mountain Heritage High School is a public high school in Burnsville, North Carolina, United States. It is the sole public high school serving Yancey County Schools district. Both YCS public middle schools, East Yancey and Cane River, feed into Mountain Heritage. As of 2025 it is classified by NCHSAA as a 3A institution, having been reclassified from 1A in 2021.

== History ==
Mountain Heritage was established in 1976 when East Yancey High School merged with Cane River High School to form a single high school for the district.

== Academics ==
Mountain Heritage offers college prep, career and technical education, and special education courses. Eight Advanced Placement courses are offered, and students are permitted to register for courses at Mayland Community College as part of their dual enrollment program. Mountain Heritage received a B rating for academics in the 2013–2014 school year from Public Schools of North Carolina.

== Athletics ==
The Mountain Heritage Cougars participate in the 2A/3A Western Highlands Conference. In the fall, the school offers cheerleading, cross country, football, men's soccer, women's tennis, volleyball, and women's golf. In the winter, the school offers cheerleading, men's basketball, women's basketball, and wrestling. In the spring, the school offers men's golf, women's soccer, softball, men's tennis, track, and baseball.

In 2009, the Mountain Heritage football team traveled to the first state championship game in the team's history, but was defeated by Tarboro High School 28–3.

In 2019, the girls' basketball team completed a 29–0 undefeated season and earned the school's first ever team state championship under coach Susie Shelton, beating Farmville Central 63–53 at Reynolds Coliseum in Raleigh.
