= Kona, North Carolina =

- Unincorporated community
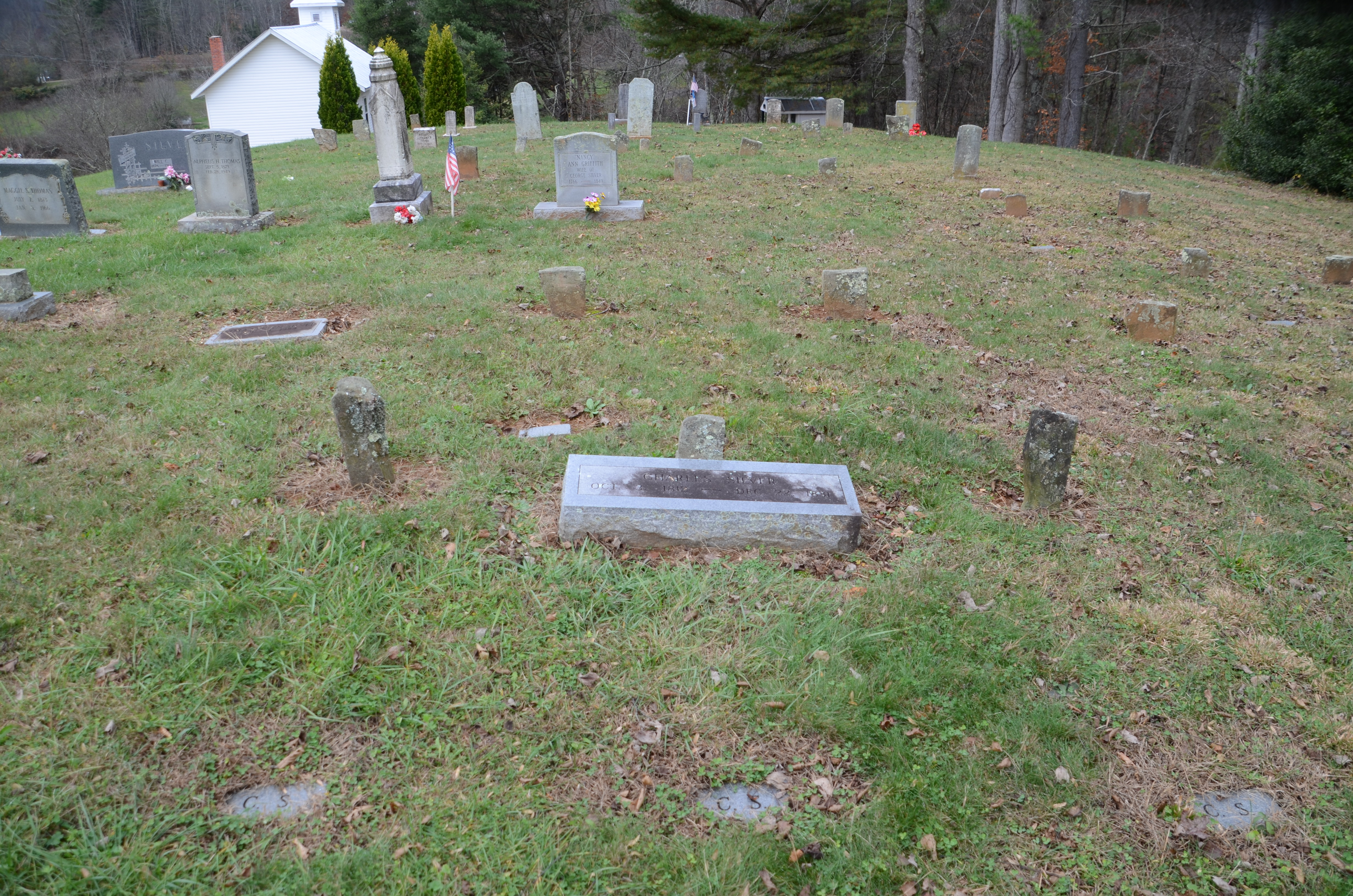
- The grave of Charles Silver

- Location within North Carolina Location within the United States
- Coordinates: 35°57′05″N 82°11′06″W
- Country: United States
- State: North Carolina
- County: Mitchell
- Founded: 1916
- Named for: Feldspar
- Elevation: 2,359 ft (719 m)
- Time zone: UTC-5 (Eastern (EST))
  - Summer (DST): UTC-4 (EDT)
- ZIP Code: 28705 (Bakersville)
- Area code: 828
- GNIS feature ID: 1021066

Kona is an unincorporated community in Mitchell County, North Carolina, United States. The community is located along North Carolina Highway 80 (NC 80), near the confluence of the North and South Toe Rivers and at the western slope of Ellis Mountain.

== History ==
The community of Kona is named after the chemical make-up of feldspar; K for potassium, O for oxygen, and Na for sodium. Founded in 1916, Kona became the original starting point for the Black Mountain Railway (later owned by Yancey Railroad) and where it connected to the South and Western Railroad (later owned by Clinchfield Railroad); it had daily roundtrip passenger and mixed train service to Murchison, via Burnsville. By the 1950s, only freight service remained along both lines; in 1982, the Yancey Railroad ceased operations and the rail line was abandoned. CSX, successor of the Clinchfield Railroad, continues rail service through the area.

The Kona Post Office operated from 1916 to 1953, when it was replaced with rural letter carrier service from Bakersville.

== Notable person ==
- Frankie Stewart Silver, axe murderer and one of the first women executed in North Carolina, for the murder of her husband Charles, 1833.
