= Swiss, North Carolina =

Populated place in North Carolina, United States

Coordinates: 35°54′51″N 82°26′59″W

Swiss is a populated place in the Cane River Township of Yancey County, North Carolina, United States. Its elevation is 2,756 ft (840 m).
