= David M. Buck House =

Historic house in North Carolina, United States

- U.S. National Register of Historic Places
- Location within North Carolina Location within the United States
- Location: NC 1395, 1.1 miles SW of jct with NC 1401, near Bald Mountain, North Carolina
- Coordinates: 35°57′52″N 82°28′24″W
- Area: 11.4 acres (4.6 ha)
- Built: c. 1904
- Architectural style: Colonial Revival
- NRHP reference No.: 01000420
- Added to NRHP: April 25, 2001

The David M. Buck House is a historic house located near Bald Mountain, Yancey County, North Carolina.

== Description and history ==
It was built around 1904 and is a large, two-story frame dwelling in the Colonial Revival style. The front façade features a wide, one-story porch supported by turned columns. Other contributing elements on the property include stone walls, three domestic outbuildings (spring house, apple house, and wood shed), a store, and the family cemetery (1938).

The property was added to the National Register of Historic Places on April 25, 2001.
