= South Toe River =

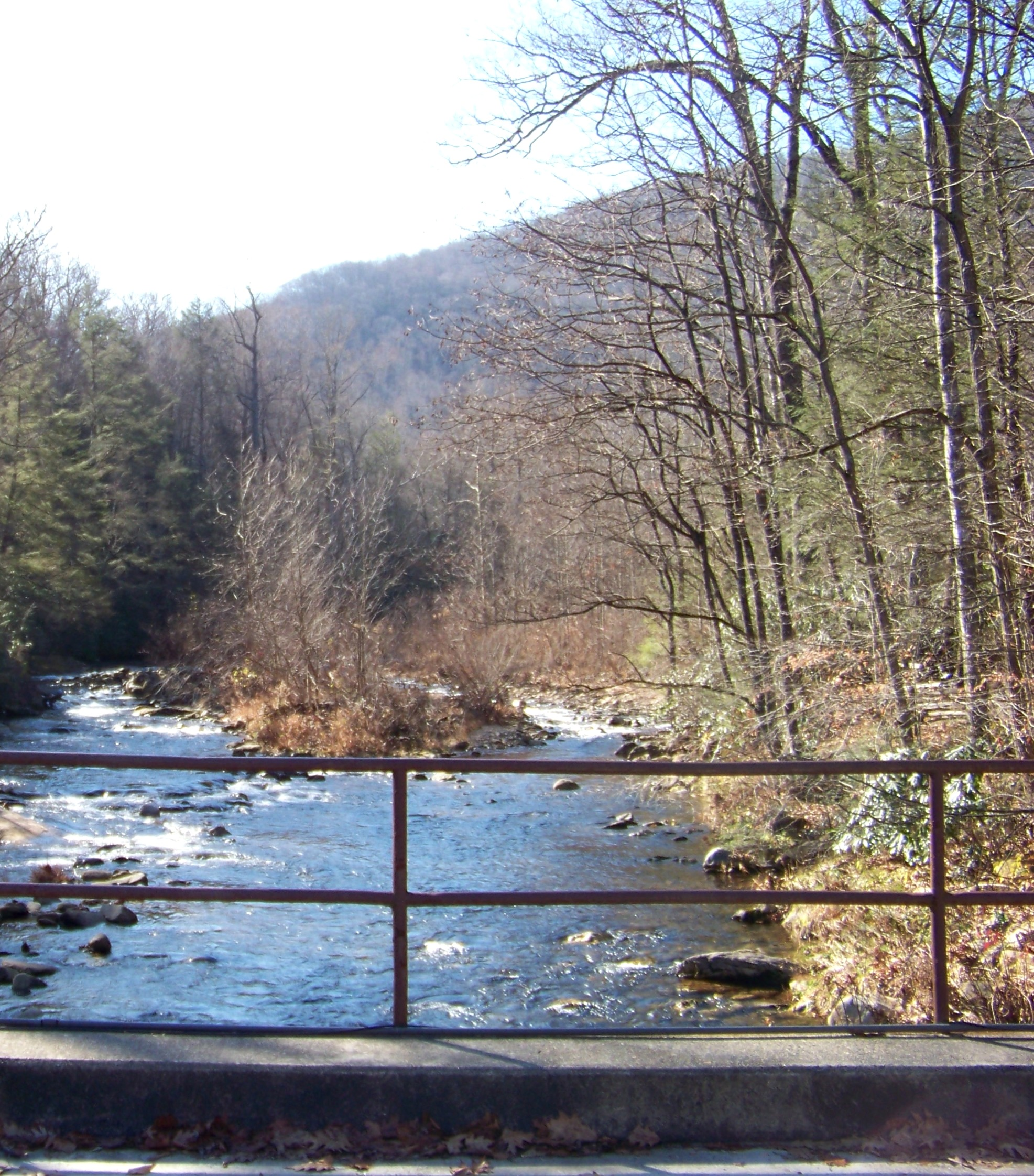

- Location of the mouth of South Toe River in North Carolina

Location
- Country: United States
- State: North Carolina
- County: Yancey

Physical characteristics
- Source: Confluence of Hemphill Creek and Left Prong South Toe River
  - location: North Carolina
  - coordinates: 35°42′39″N 82°15′01″W
  - elevation: 3,855 ft (1,175 m)
- Mouth: North Toe River
  - location: Kona, North Carolina
  - coordinates: 35°56′36″N 82°11′10″W
  - elevation: 2,333 ft (711 m)
- Length: 32.7 mi (52.6 km)
- Basin size: 227.99 square miles (590.5 km^{2})

Basin features
- Progression: South Toe → North Toe → Nolichucky → French Broad → Tennessee → Ohio → Mississippi → Gulf of Mexico
- River system: French Broad River

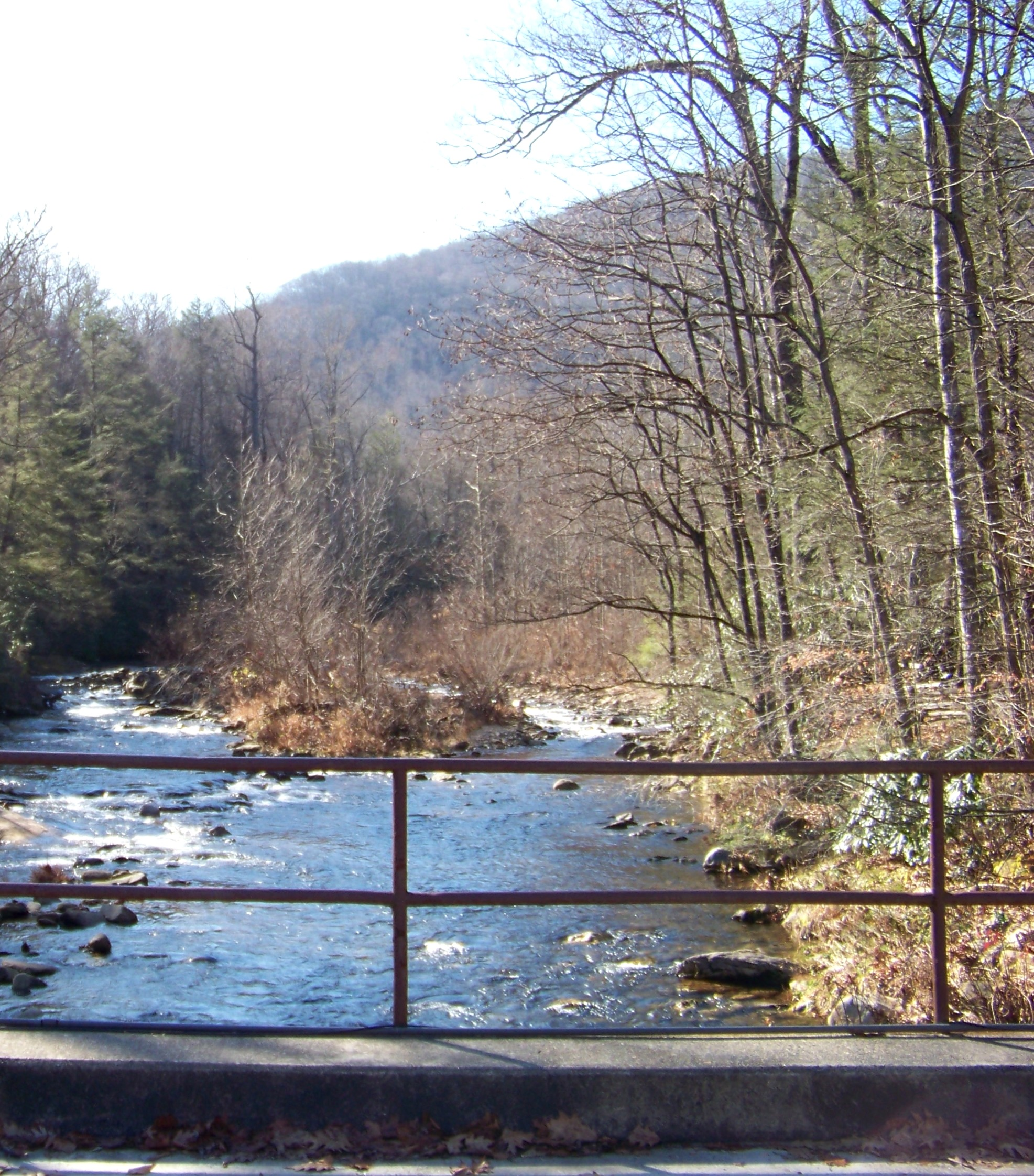
Crossing the South Toe River

The South Toe River is a river in Yancey County in Western North Carolina. The name Toe is taken from its original name Estatoe, pronounced 'S - ta - toe', a native American name associated with the Estatoe trade route leading down from the NC mountains through Brevard where there is a historical plaque with information that affirms the route, on into South Carolina where a village of the same name was located.

The stream headwaters originate in the ravine between the eastern side of the Black Mountains and the Blue Ridge Parkway near the Eastern Continental Divide at 35°42′39″N 82°15′01″W. It flows northward, alongside North Carolina Highway 80, until it merges with the North Toe River at about 2333 feet above sea level at 35°56′36″N 82°11′10″W. At the confluence the far bank (northeast) of the North Toe lies within Mitchell County and the community of Kona lies on the east bank of the North Toe less than one-half mile to the northwest. The water continues to the Nolichucky River, Tennessee River, Ohio River, and Mississippi River to the Gulf of Mexico.

The NC Wildlife Resources Commission stocks much of the river with trout for fishing, but the headwaters is designated as wild trout waters. The river is also home to a population of the Appalachian elktoe, an endangered species of freshwater mussel.

Tributaries from the west side include Hemphill Creek, Right Prong South Toe River, Left Prong South Toe River, South Fork Upper Creek, Middle Fork Upper Creek, Grassy Knob Branch, Lower Creek, Camp Creek, Setrock Creek, Little Mountain Creek, Laurel Branch, Middle Creek, Rock Creek, Colbert Creek, Locust Creek, Oak Forest Creek, White Oak Creek, and Brown's Creek. Tributaries coming from the east side include, Still Fork Creek, Clear Creek, Little White Oak Creek, Hannah Branch, Bobs Creek, Phips Branch, Murphy Branch.
