= Chase-Coletta House =

Historic house in North Carolina, United States

- U.S. National Register of Historic Places
- Location within North Carolina Location within the United States
- Location: 108 Town Sq., Burnsville, North Carolina
- Coordinates: 35°55′0″N 82°17′56″W
- Area: 0.7 acres (0.28 ha)
- Built: 1915
- Architectural style: Bungalow/craftsman
- NRHP reference No.: 04000605
- Added to NRHP: June 16, 2004

Chase-Coletta House, also known as the Lillie Ray Chase House, is a historic home located on the town square of Burnsville, Yancey County, North Carolina. It was built in 1914–1915, and is a 1 1/2-story, rectangular, Bungalow / American Craftsman style frame dwelling. It sits on a brick foundation and is sheathed in weatherboard. It features large gable dormers, a sleeping porch, and a hip roofed wraparound porch on brick piers. Also on the property is a contributing shed (c. 1925).

It was listed on the National Register of Historic Places in 2004.
