= Micaville, North Carolina =

Micaville
- Unincorporated community
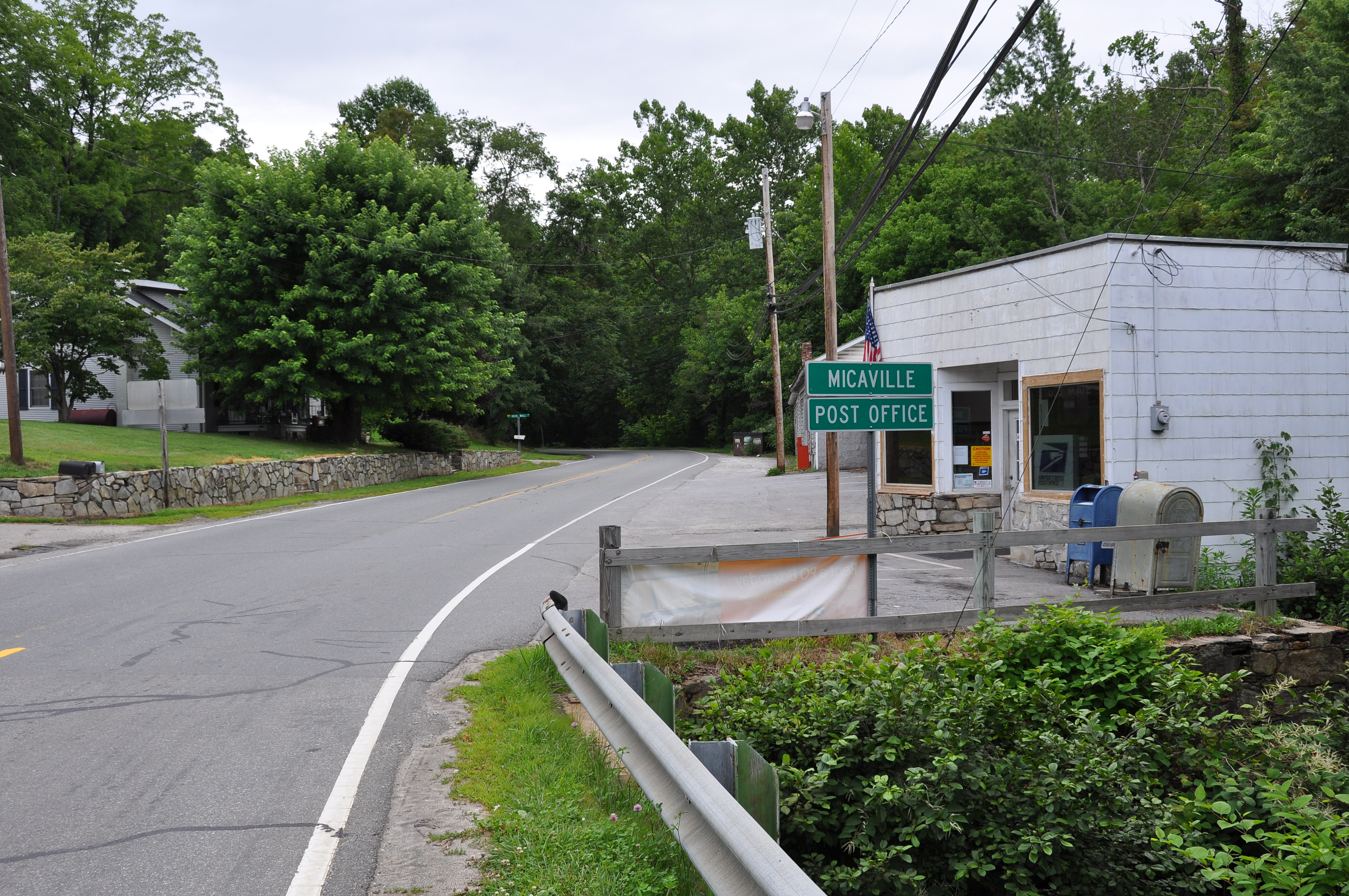
- Micaville sign and Post Office

- Location within the state of North Carolina
- Coordinates: 35°54′34″N 82°12′47″W
- Country: United States
- State: North Carolina
- County: Yancey
- Elevation: 2,441 ft (744 m)
- Time zone: UTC-5 (Eastern (EST))
  - Summer (DST): UTC-4 (EDT)
- ZIP code: 28755
- GNIS feature ID: 1021421

Micaville (/ˈmaɪkəvɪl/ MAYH-kuh-vil) is an unincorporated community in the Crabtree Township of Yancey County, North Carolina, United States. The name comes from a mineral mined there called mica. It was the central mining location in the county.

Micaville was a main point on the Yancey Railroad (YAN) carrying mica and feldspar, along with fertilizer, building materials, livestock feed and steel spring wire. Due to damage from Hurricane Agnes and flooding from other storms most of the bridges, track and branches were destroyed. Engine number 40 now sits abandoned along 19E in Micaville, across the road from the Silver Bullet convenience store.

In the early 1900s, the Black Mountain Railroad, later operating as the Yancey Railroad (YAN) transformed the economy from an agricultural-based into a mining community with later lumber harvesting adding into the economy.

== Education ==
Micaville Elementary School is operated by Yancey County Schools System.

== See also ==
Burnsville, North Carolina, the neighboring incorporated town and county seat.
