= Pensacola, North Carolina =

Pensacola
- Unincorporated community
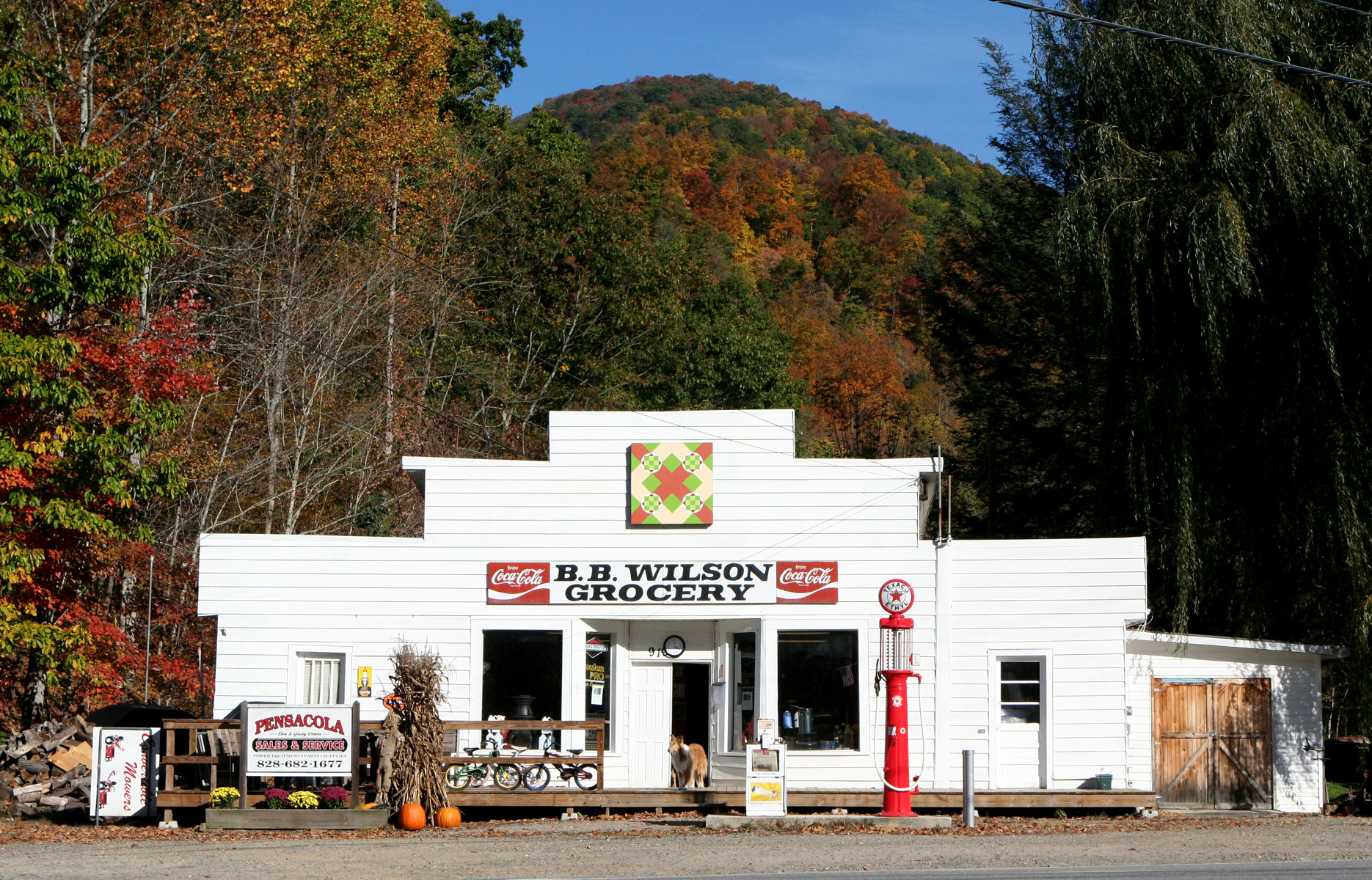
- Shop in Pensacola in 2008

- Location within the state of North Carolina
- Coordinates: 35.8478923°N 82.3081814°W
- Country: United States
- State: North Carolina
- County: Yancey

Population (2020)
  - Total: 548
- Time zone: UTC-5 (Eastern (EST))
  - Summer (DST): UTC-4 (EDT)
- ZIP code: 28714

Pensacola is an unincorporated community in Yancey County, North Carolina, United States.

== History ==
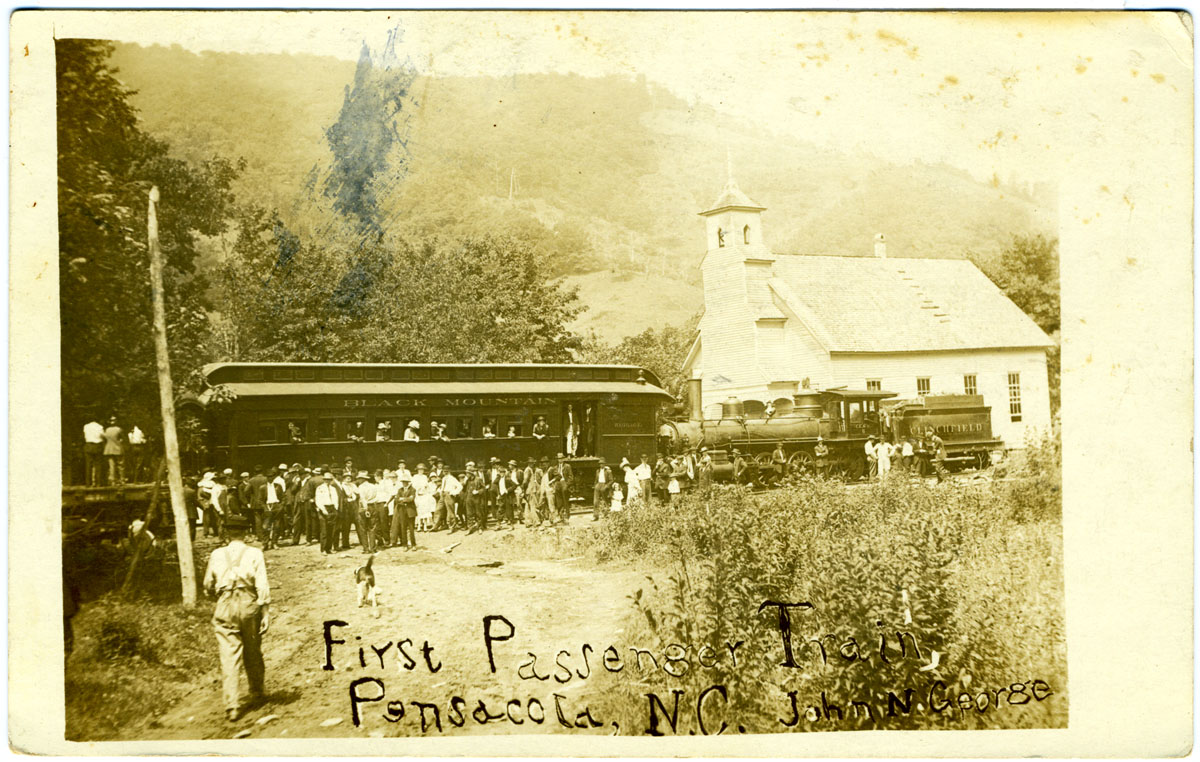
First passenger train arrives in Pensacola, North Carolina, in 1913

Pensacola was formerly serviced by the Yancey Railroad.

Pensacola was damaged in the flooding from Hurricane Helene in 2024
