= Bald Creek Historic District =

Historic district in North Carolina, United States

- U.S. National Register of Historic Places
- U.S. Historic district
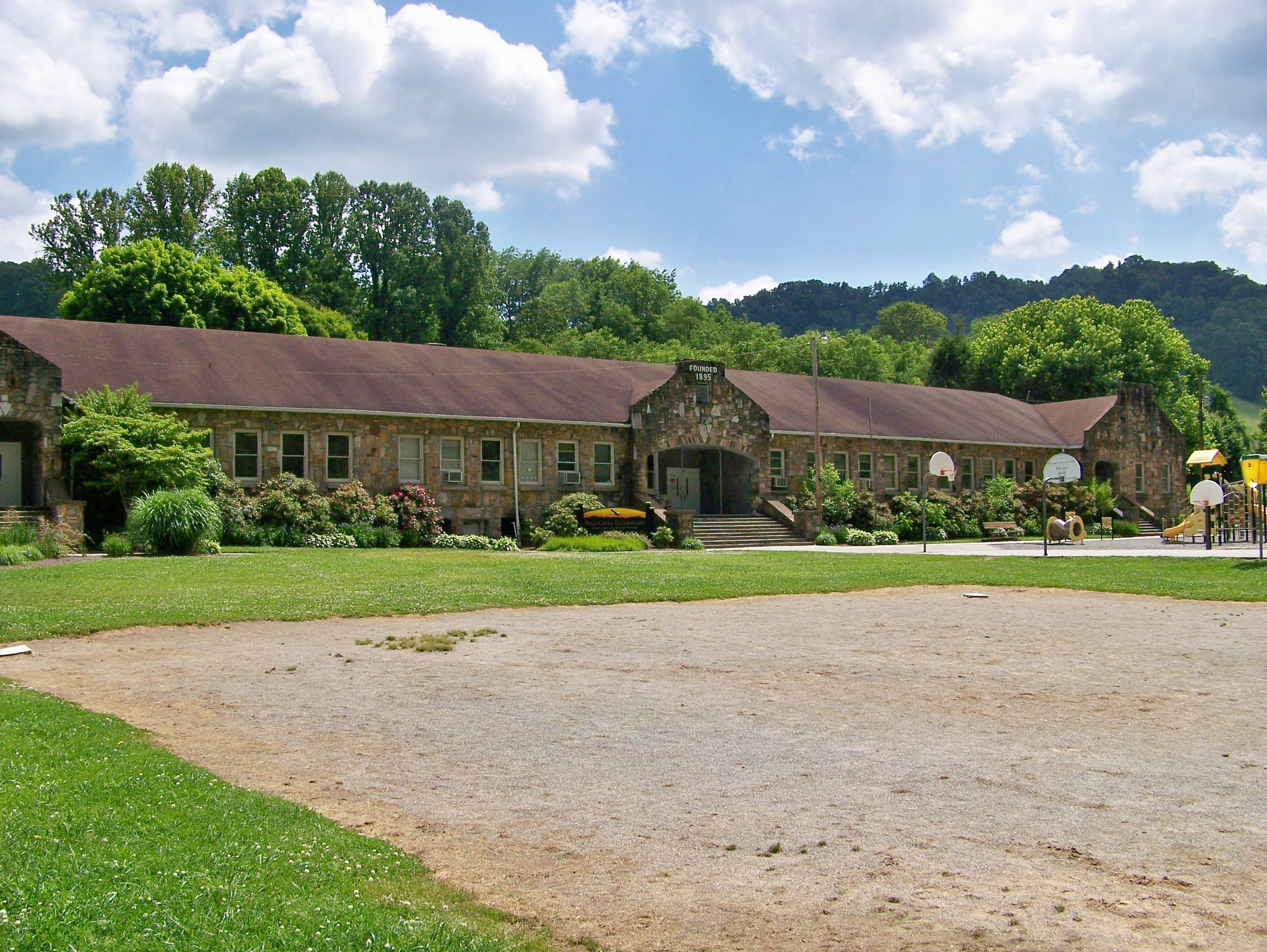
- Bald Creek Elementary School, June 2013

- Location within North Carolina Location within the United States
- Location: Both sides of Bald Creek School Rd., 76-239 Pleasant Valley Rd., and 6193-6195 US 19E, Burnsville, North Carolina
- Coordinates: 35°54′45″N 82°25′22″W
- Area: 16.8 acres (6.8 ha)
- Built: 1938
- Architectural style: Bungalow/craftsman, Rustic Revival
- NRHP reference No.: 08001391
- Added to NRHP: January 29, 2009

Bald Creek Historic District is a national historic district within the community of Bald Creek located about ten miles west of Burnsville, Yancey County, North Carolina.

The district encompasses 18 contributing buildings and 5 contributing structures in the Bald Creek community. The district includes notable examples of Bungalow / American Craftsman and Rustic Revival style architecture. Notable contributing resources include the C.W. Burton House (c. 1900), Burton-Howell House (c. 1930), Works Progress Administration supported Bald Creek Elementary School and Gymnasium (1938), Bald Creek United Methodist Church (1951-1955), Wilson House (c. 1930), and Glenn Proffitt House (c. 1920).

It was listed on the National Register of Historic Places in 2009.
