= Citizens Bank Building (Burnsville, North Carolina) =

Historic building in North Carolina, US

- U.S. National Register of Historic Places
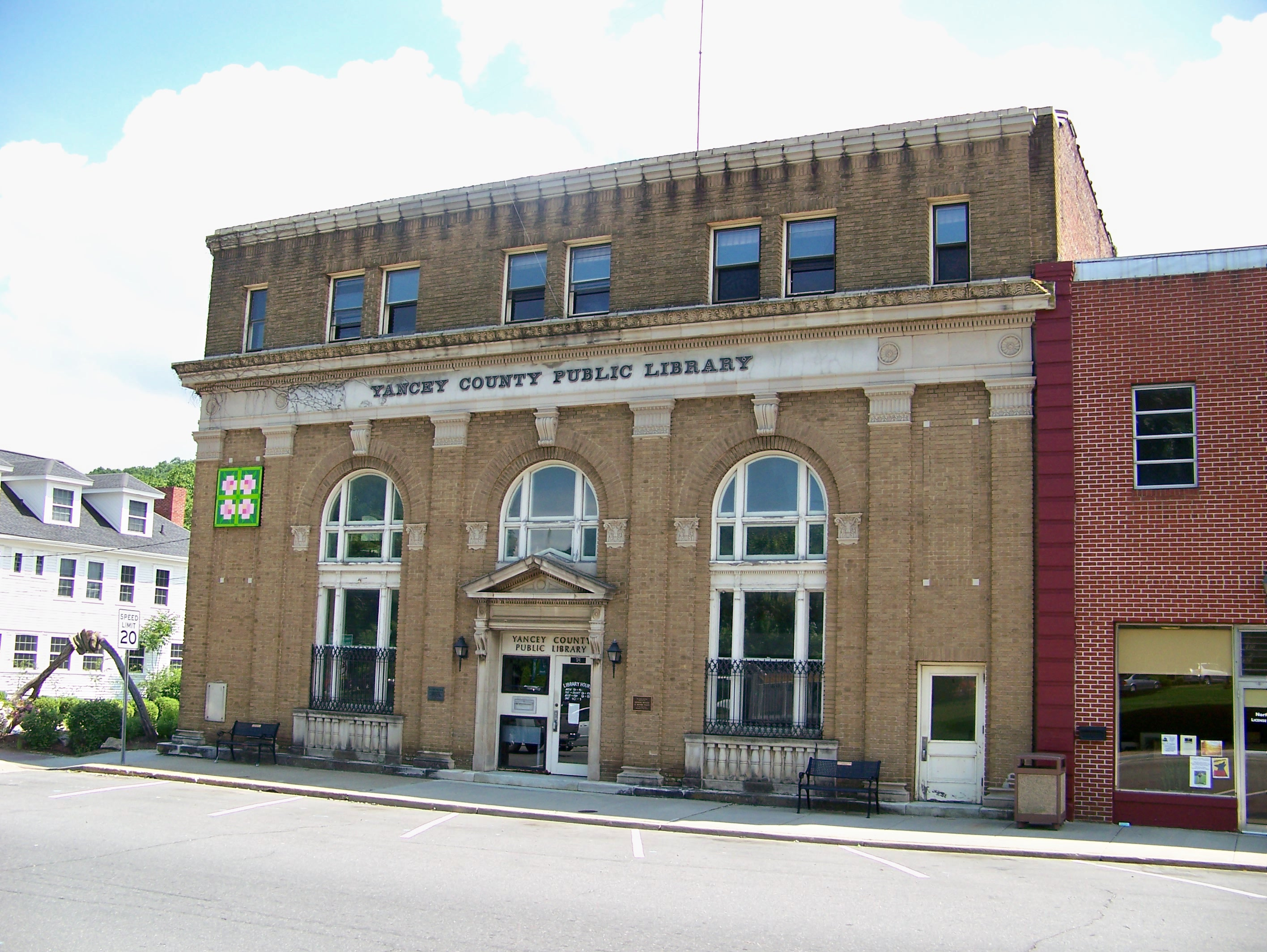
- Former Citizens Bank Building, June 2013

- Location within North Carolina Location within the United States
- Location: Town Sq., Burnsville, North Carolina
- Coordinates: 35°54′59″N 82°18′0″W
- Area: 0.1 acres (0.040 ha)
- Built: 1925
- Architectural style: Renaissance
- NRHP reference No.: 90000545
- Added to NRHP: March 29, 1990

Citizens Bank Building, also known as the Yancey County Public Library Building, is a historic bank building located at Burnsville, Yancey County, North Carolina. It was built in 1925, and is a three-story, yellow brick Renaissance Revival-style building. The front facade features fluted Corinthian order pilasters and arched brick openings. The building housed a bank until 1972, when it was donated for use as a county library.

It was listed on the National Register of Historic Places in 1990.
