= John Wesley McElroy House =

Historic house in North Carolina, United States

- U.S. National Register of Historic Places
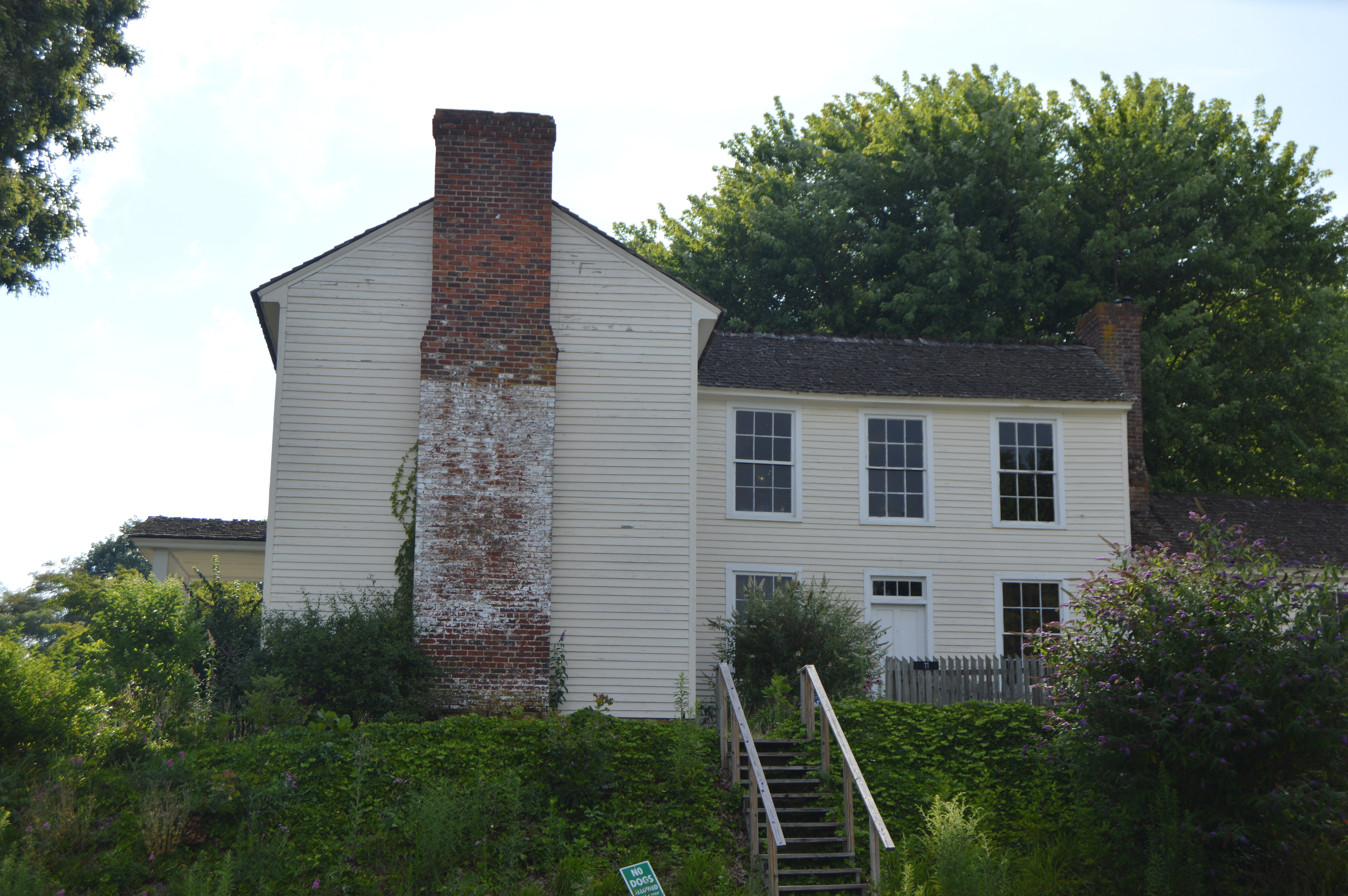
- Eastern side

- Location within North Carolina Location within the United States
- Location: 11 Academy St., Burnsville, North Carolina
- Coordinates: 35°55′4″N 82°18′5″W
- Area: 0.7 acres (0.28 ha)
- Built: 1845
- Architect: Ephraim Clayton
- Architectural style: Vernacular Federal-Greek Revival
- NRHP reference No.: 90001802
- Added to NRHP: November 29, 1990

The John Wesley McElroy House is a historic house museum in Burnsville, Yancey County, North Carolina. The vernacular Federal-Greek Revival style house, which was built in the 1840s, is on the National Register of Historic Places.

== History ==
The 3,000-square-foot (280 m^{2}) house was built by John Wesley McElroy as a mansion for his wife, Catherine. McElroy was a local businessman and lawyer, and a brigadier general in the Confederate Army. During the war, the house was used as a hospital and the headquarters for the home guard. In 1889 the house was purchased by William Moore, a state senator and former captain in the Union Army. Moore's family lived in the house until 1917 and it became the first Post Office in Burnsville. During the 1970s the house was abandoned and fell into disrepair.

The house was purchased in 1987 by the Yancey History Association. The Association restored the building, which was opened as the Rush Wray Museum of Yancey County History in 2003. The museum houses period furniture and exhibits on local history.

== Sources ==
- Heritage of the Toe River Valley, Volume II, Lloyd Bailey - McElroy House, Michael C. Hardy
