= Parkway Playhouse =

Summer theater playhouse

Coordinates: 35.9220°N 82.2946°W

The Parkway Playhouse, located in Burnsville, North Carolina, is the oldest continually operating summer theater in North Carolina.

It was established in 1947 by Dr. William Raymond Taylor, a professor of drama at Woman's College on Greensboro, North Carolina (now the University of North Carolina-Greensboro).

The Parkway Playhouse, for many years, was operated as a summer stock venue and a sponsored extension of the drama departments at UNC-G and the University of Miami. In the 1990s the Parkway Playhouse became an independent theater company, and is now operating as a small professional theater company serving the mountain region of Western North Carolina. It is housed in the (Former) Burnsville High School Gymnasium in the Yancey Collegiate Institute Historic District.

== See also ==
- Nu-Wray Inn
