= Mayland Community College =

College in Spruce Pine, North Carolina, U.S.

Coordinates: 35.9345°N 82.0170°W

- Type: Public community college
- Established: 1970; 56 years ago
- Parent institution: North Carolina Community College System
- President: Aron Gabriel
- Location: Spruce Pine, North Carolina, United States
- Campus: Rural
- Nickname: Highlanders
- Website: www.mayland.edu

Mayland Community College is a public community college in Spruce Pine, North Carolina. The college also operates learning centers in Newland and Burnsville, North Carolina. The college's name is derived from the three counties it primarily serves: Mitchell, Avery, and Yancey. It is part of the North Carolina Community College System.

Mayland Community College was first chartered as Mayland Technical Institute in February 1970 by the General Assembly of North Carolina upon recommendations by the State Board of Education, the Advisory Budget Commission, and Governor Robert W. Scott. The president of the college has been Aron Gabriel since January 2026.

Mayland offers a variety of curriculum programs, including numerous college transfer options, as well as nursing, adult education, distance learning, and dual enrollment for high school students. To assist the local workforce, MCC provides workforce development and continuing education courses that directly serve the needs of local and regional businesses and industries, as well as the civic and cultural interests of the community.
