= Yancey County Courthouse =

- U.S. National Register of Historic Places
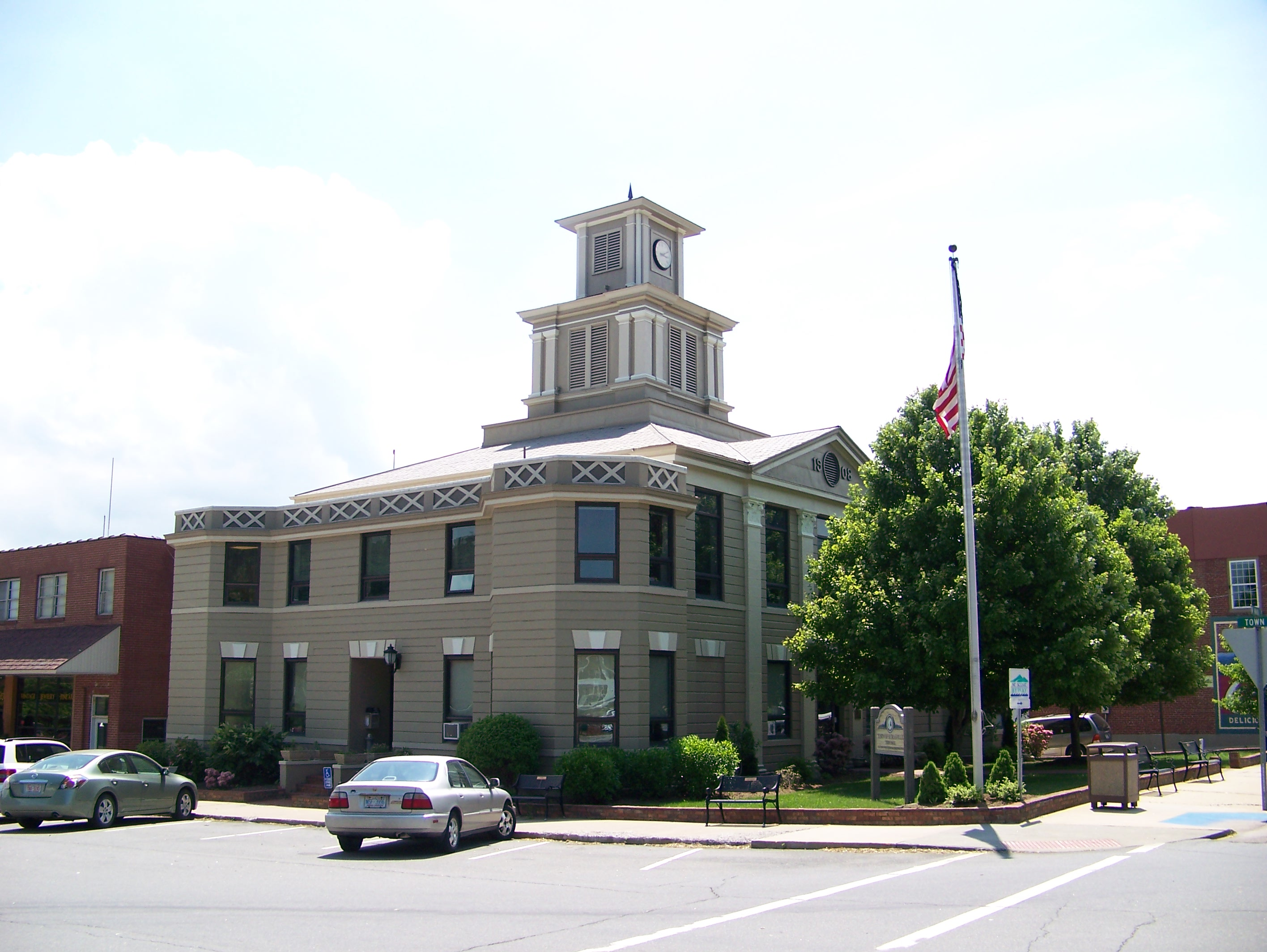
- Burnsville Town Hall, June 2013

- Location within North Carolina Location within the United States
- Location: 2 Town Square, Burnsville, North Carolina
- Coordinates: 35°55′0″N 82°18′1″W
- Area: less than one acre
- Built: 1908
- Architectural style: Classical Revival
- MPS: North Carolina County Courthouses TR
- NRHP reference No.: 79001767
- Added to NRHP: May 10, 1979

The old Yancey County Courthouse is a historic courthouse located on the town square of Burnsville, Yancey County, North Carolina, now serving as the Burnsville Town Hall. It was built in 1908, and is a two-story, Classical Revival style, concrete block building faced in stucco. It has a central pedimented entrance pavilion on the northern side surmounted by a blocky cupola.

The building features Corinthian order pilasters and polygonal corner projections. It served as the location for county offices until 1965, when a new courthouse was constructed on the other side of the square. The building sat vacant for ten years before being transferred to the town. The original cupola was moved to the new courthouse, and eventually replaced with a clock tower.

It was listed on the National Register of Historic Places in 1979.
