= Yancey Collegiate Institute Historic District =

Historic school building in North Carolina, United States

- U.S. National Register of Historic Places
- U.S. Historic district
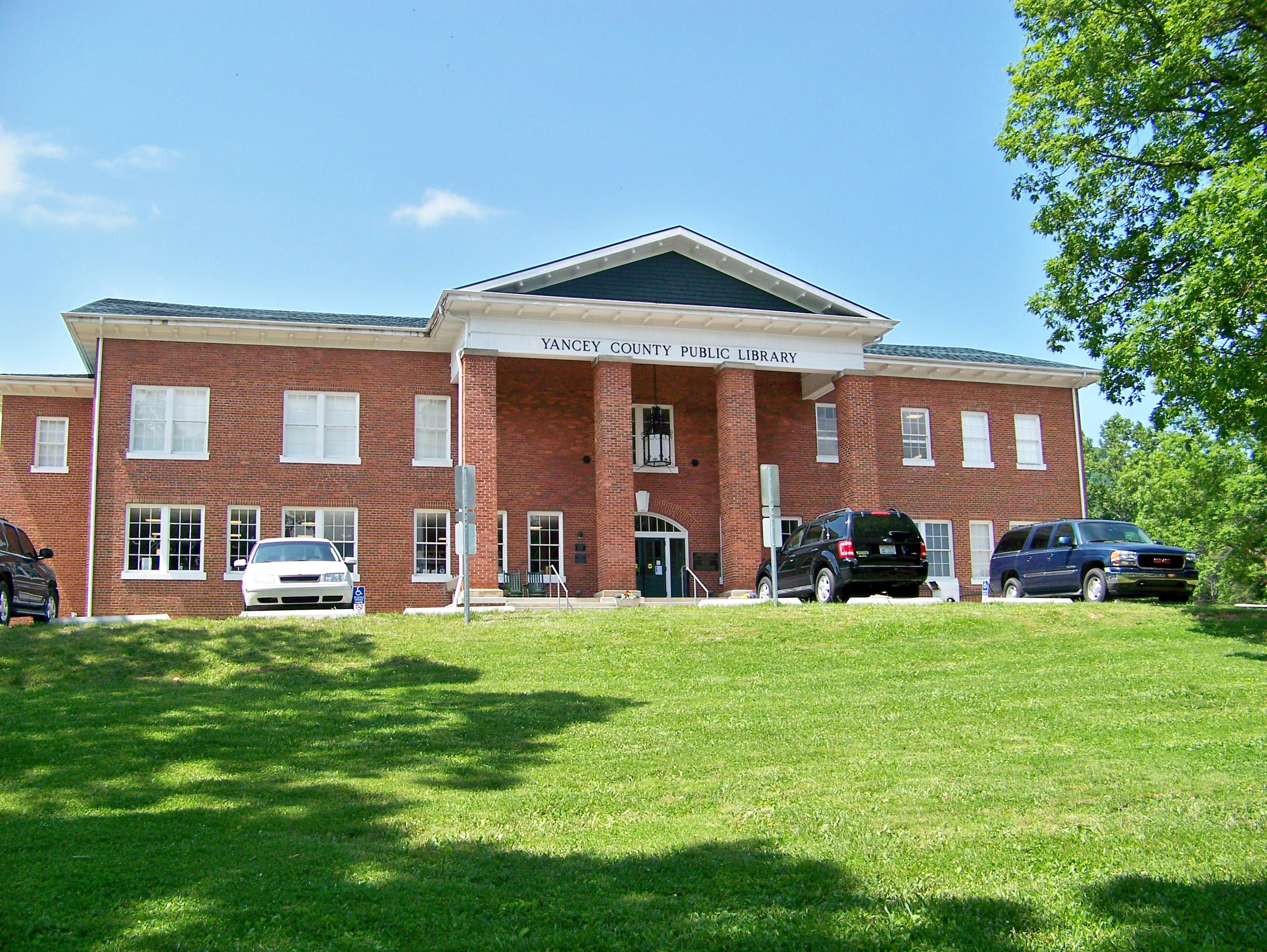
- Yancey County Library, June 2013

- Location within North Carolina Location within the United States
- Location: School Cir. and Green Mountain Dr., Burnsville, North Carolina
- Coordinates: 35°55′18″N 82°17′39″W
- Area: 3.2 acres (1.3 ha)
- Built: 1914
- Architectural style: Classical Revival, Colonial Revival, et al.
- NRHP reference No.: 03000799
- Added to NRHP: August 21, 2003

Yancey Collegiate Institute Historic District is a historic school complex and national historic district located at Burnsville, Yancey County, North Carolina. The district encompasses seven contributing buildings, one contributing structure, and one contributing object built between 1914 and 1955. Contributing resources include the Brown Dormitory for Boys (1914), (Former) Burnsville High School Gymnasium (Parkway Playhouse, 1933, 1947, 1955), an outdoor amphitheater (1950-1952), the Classical Revival style (Second) Administration Building for Yancey Collegiate Institute (1919, 1922), Gymnasium (c. 1946), former Burnsville High School built by the Works Progress Administration (1939) and a stone retaining wall (c. 1950). The Yancey Collegiate Institute (YCI) was established in 1901 and sponsored by the Baptist church. The YCI educated students until 1926, when the facilities were sold to the Yancey County Board of Education.

It was listed on the National Register of Historic Places in 2003.
