= Nu Wray Inn =

- Nu-Wray Inn
- U.S. National Register of Historic Places
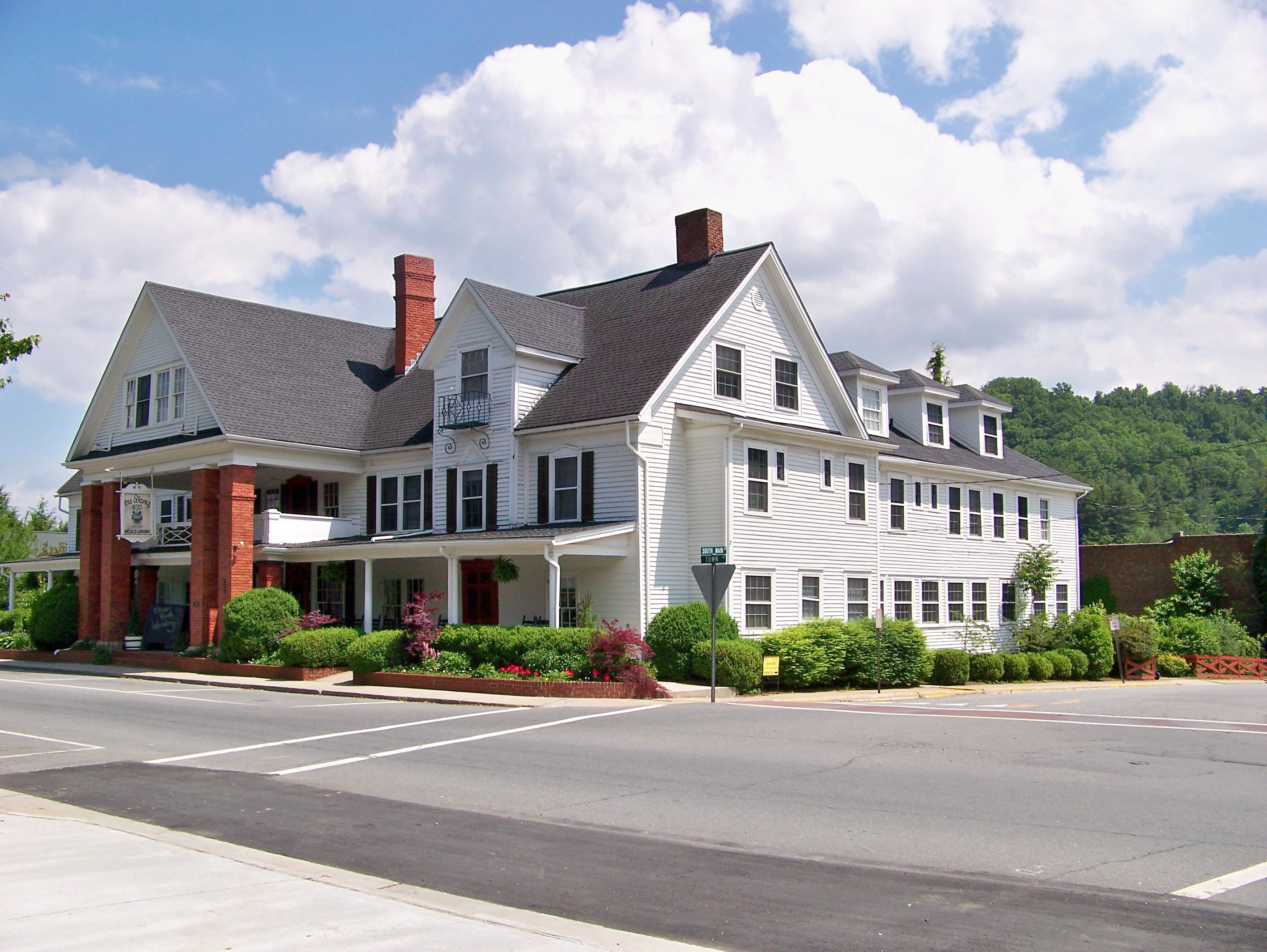

- Location within North Carolina Location within the United States
- Location: Off US 19E, Burnsville, North Carolina
- Coordinates: 35°54′59″N 82°17′58″W
- Area: 0.7 acres (0.28 ha)
- Built: 1833
- Architectural style: Colonial Revival
- Website: www.nuwray.com
- NRHP reference No.: 82003535
- Added to NRHP: April 15, 1982

The Nu Wray Inn is an historic hotel located at Burnsville, Yancey County, North Carolina. It was built in 1833 at the time Yancey County was formed and a year before Burnsville was established. It was originally built of logs and had eight bedrooms and a dining room and kitchen. It was listed on the National Register of Historic Places in 1982.

Thomas Wolfe spent the night there in 1929 when he was a witness at a murder trial in Burnsville. Elvis Presley and William Sidney Porter (O. Henry) were also guests.

It was owned by the same family for a century until the death of Wray family patriarch Rush Wray.

Writing about the Inn in 1941 the journalist Jonathan W. Daniels said:

Everything is on the table in the Nu-Wray Hotel at Burnsville. Nobody waits to give an order. They bring it in, three or four kinds of meat, all the vegetables of the whole mountain countryside. There are dishes of homemade jellies and preserves. The country ham is excellent. The stout tables do not groan but the stuffed guest rising sometimes does. It is country plenty, country cooked and country served, but in proof that the persisting homesickness for country eating is not entirely based on legend.

It was purchased by new owners in 2021, and has been under renovation since then. It acted as an important hub for recovery efforts in the aftermath of Hurricane Helene. It housed 16 members of the New York Swift Water Rescue team before and after the storm. They also worked with World Central Kitchen and fed hundreds of people every day during the recovery.
