= Yancey County, North Carolina =

County in North Carolina, United States

- County
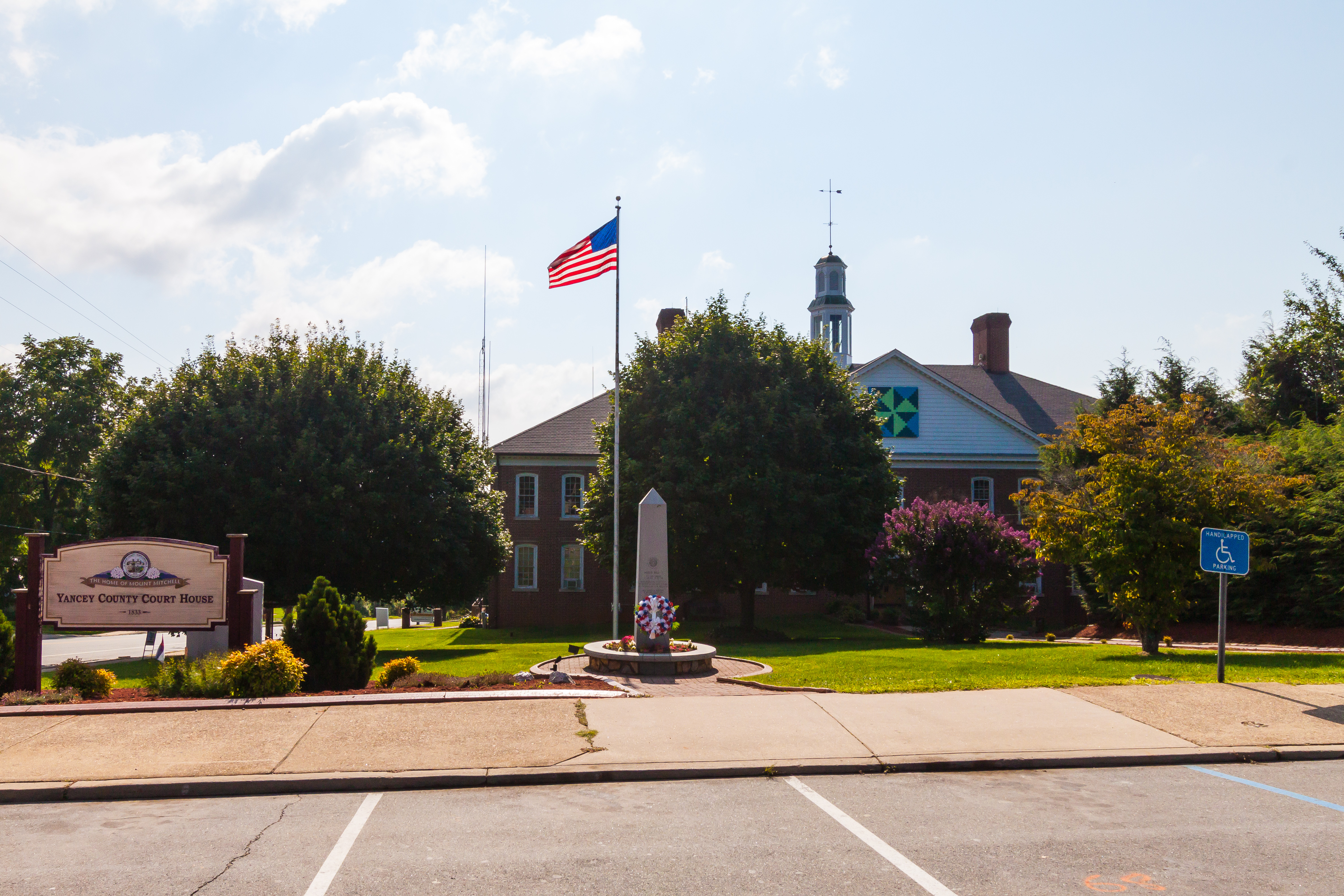
- Yancey County Courthouse

- Seal

- Location within the U.S. state of North Carolina
- Coordinates: 35.89°N 82.30°W
- Country: United States
- State: North Carolina
- Founded: 1833
- Named for: Bartlett Yancey
- Seat: Burnsville
- Largest community: Burnsville

Area
  - Total: 313.18 sq mi (811.1 km^{2})
  - Land: 312.59 sq mi (809.6 km^{2})
  - Water: 0.59 sq mi (1.5 km^{2}) 0.19%

Population (2020)
  - Total: 18,470
  - Estimate (2025): 19,084 ▲
  - Density: 59.09/sq mi (22.81/km^{2})
- Time zone: UTC−5 (Eastern)
  - Summer (DST): UTC−4 (EDT)
- Congressional district: 11th
- Website: www.yanceycountync.gov

Yancey County is a county located in the U.S. state of North Carolina. As of the 2020 census, the population was 18,470. Its county seat is Burnsville.

== History ==
The area of Yancey County was inhabited by the Cherokee prior to European settlement, as was much of the southern Appalachian region.

Independent and sturdy Scottish, English, and Scotch-Irish and Irish settlers of the Carolina frontier had crossed the Blue Ridge Mountains and settled the Toe River Valley by the mid-18th century. In the year 1796, one of the early land speculators, John Gray Blount, paid for 326,640 acres (1,321.9 km^{2}) of land, a portion of which later became Yancey County.

In December 1833, the General Assembly established a new western county, named Yancey, from sections of Burke and Buncombe counties. Yancey County was named in honor of Bartlett Yancey, of Caswell County. As a U.S. congressman (1813–1817) and as Speaker of the N.C. Senate (1817–1827), he was instrumental in many accomplishments that benefited the state, including the creation of an education fund that was the beginning of the N.C. Public School System. He was an advocate of correcting the inequality in representation in the General Assembly by the creation of new western counties; but he died on August 30, 1828, over five years before the General Assembly created a new county named in his honor. In Yancey's boundaries looms Mount Mitchell, the highest peak in the Eastern U.S., at 6,684 feet (2,037 m) above sea level.

On March 6, 1834, "Yellow Jacket" John Bailey conveyed 100 acres (0.40 km^{2}) of land for the county seat. John was given the nickname for his famous temper as told in the books The Bailey Family of Yancey County, North Carolina and Heritage of the Toe River Valley by Lloyd Richard Bailey Sr. The town was named Burnsville in honor of Captain Otway Burns, who voted for the creation of the new western county when he was serving in the General Assembly. He was also a naval hero in the War of 1812. A statue of Captain Burns stands on a 40-ton, Mount Airy granite pedestal in the center of the town's public square, which was given the official name of "Bailey Square" by the Yancey County Board of Commissioners on September 1, 1930. The statue of Captain Burns was given to the county on July 5, 1909, by Walter Francis Burns, a grandson of the naval captain. The inscription reads:

Otway Burns - Born in Onslow County, North Carolina, 1777 - Died at Portsmouth, North Carolina, 1850. Sailor - Soldier - Statesman. North Carolina's Foremost Son in the War of 1812-1815 - For Him, This Town Is Named - He Guarded Well Our Seas, Let Our Mountains Honor Him.

=== Natural disasters (21st century) ===
In September 2024, Hurricane Helene affected Yancey County, producing heavy rainfall that resulted in flooding, road closures, power outages, and damage to public and private infrastructure. The storm caused disruptions to transportation, emergency services, and county operations as local and state agencies responded to the developing conditions.

Under the leadership of Sheriff Shane Hilliard, the Yancey County Sheriff’s Office played a key role in emergency response efforts during and after the storm. Deputies assisted with evacuations, traffic control, welfare checks, and coordination with emergency management officials. The Sheriff’s Office worked alongside local fire departments, emergency medical services, and volunteer first responders to respond to hazardous conditions, conduct rescues, and support residents affected by flooding and storm-related damage. Firefighters and rescue personnel from multiple departments responded to incidents involving flooded roadways, stranded motorists, and structural damage while maintaining essential emergency services throughout the county.

Hurricane Helene also created challenges for county operations later in 2024, including preparations for the November general election. Damage to infrastructure and ongoing recovery efforts required contingency planning by the Yancey County Board of Elections. Under the guidance of Elections Director Mary Beth Tipton, election officials worked to ensure continuity of election administration, including securing polling locations, safeguarding voting equipment, and communicating updates to voters as needed. These efforts were discussed in regional and national media coverage, including a public media interview addressing election preparedness following the storm.

Recovery and repair efforts across Yancey County continued in the months following Hurricane Helene as local officials, emergency responders, and residents addressed long-term impacts to infrastructure and public services.

== Geography ==
Interactive map of Yancey County

According to the U.S. Census Bureau, the county has a total area of 313.18 square miles (811.1 km^{2}), of which 312.59 square miles (809.6 km^{2}) is land and 0.59 square miles (1.5 km^{2}) (0.19%) is water. Mount Mitchell at 6,684 feet (2,037 m), within Mount Mitchell State Park in Yancey County, is the highest point in the United States east of the Mississippi River. The Black Mountains, of which Mt. Mitchell is a part, contains five of the 10 highest peaks east of the Mississippi, all over 6,400 ft (2,000 m). In descending order of height, they are: Mount Mitchell, Mount Craig, Balsam Cone, Mount Gibbes, and Potato Hill.

=== National protected areas ===
- Blue Ridge Parkway (part)
- Crabtree Falls (part)
- Pisgah National Forest (part)

=== State and local protected areas/sites ===
- Bare Dark Sky Observatory
- Carolina Hemlocks Recreation Area
- John Wesley McElroy House
- Mount Mitchell State Park
- Nu-Wray Inn
- Pisgah National Forest Game Land (part)
- Ray-Cort Recreation Park

=== Major water bodies ===
- Big Crabtree Creek
- Big Creek
- Bowlens Creek
- Cane River
- Left Prong South Toe River
- Nolichucky River
- Right Prong South Toe River
- South Toe River
- Still Fork Creek

=== Adjacent counties ===
- Mitchell County – northeast
- McDowell County – southeast
- Buncombe County – southwest
- Madison County – west
- Unicoi County, Tennessee – northwest

=== Major highways ===
- US 19
- US 19E
- US 19W
- NC 80
- NC 128
- NC 197
- Blue Ridge Parkway

== Demographics ==
Historical population
Census	Pop.	Note	%±
1840	5,962		—
1850	8,205		37.6%
1860	8,655		5.5%
1870	5,909		−31.7%
1880	7,694		30.2%
1890	9,490		23.3%
1900	11,464		20.8%
1910	12,072		5.3%
1920	15,093		25.0%
1930	14,486		−4.0%
1940	17,202		18.7%
1950	16,306		−5.2%
1960	14,008		−14.1%
1970	12,629		−9.8%
1980	14,934		18.3%
1990	15,419		3.2%
2000	17,774		15.3%
2010	17,818		0.2%
2020	18,470		3.7%
2025 (est.)	19,084	▲	3.3%
U.S. Decennial Census; 1790–1960 1900–1990; 1990–2000 2010 2020

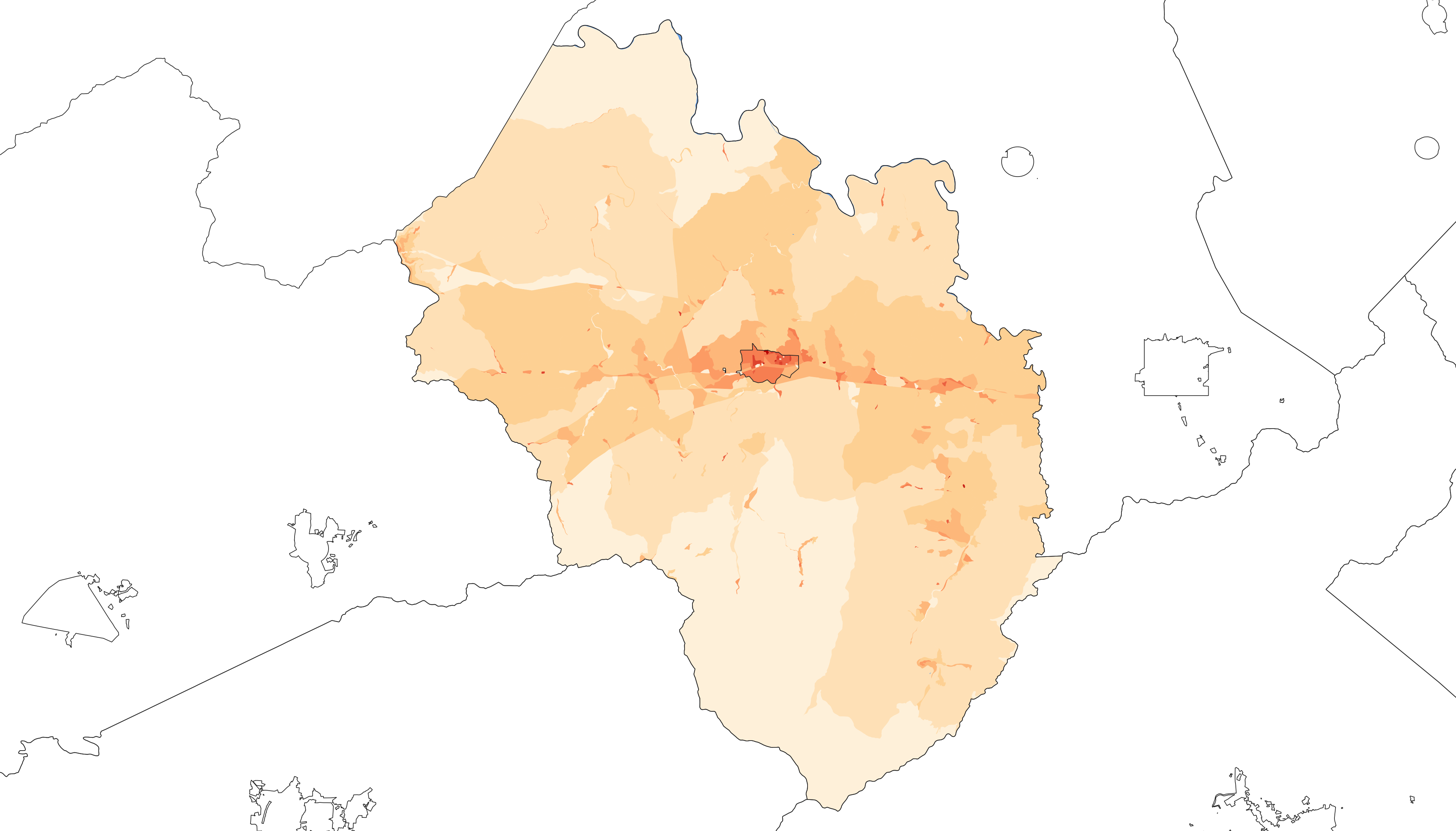
2020 population density of Yancey County NC by census block

=== Racial and ethnic composition ===
Yancey County, North Carolina – Racial and ethnic composition Note: the US Census treats Hispanic/Latino as an ethnic category. This table excludes Latinos from the racial categories and assigns them to a separate category. Hispanics/Latinos may be of any race.
Race / Ethnicity (NH = Non-Hispanic)	Pop 1980	Pop 1990	Pop 2000	Pop 2010	Pop 2020	% 1980	% 1990	% 2000	% 2010	% 2020
White alone (NH)	14,632	15,181	17,033	16,652	16,625	97.98%	98.46%	95.83%	93.46%	90.01%
Black or African American alone (NH)	197	151	101	128	104	1.32%	0.98%	0.57%	0.72%	0.56%
Native American or Alaska Native alone (NH)	21	27	38	42	57	0.14%	0.18%	0.21%	0.24%	0.31%
Asian alone (NH)	9	11	22	34	40	0.06%	0.07%	0.12%	0.19%	0.22%
Native Hawaiian or Pacific Islander alone (NH)	x	x	0	2	1	x	x	0.00%	0.01%	0.01%
Other race alone (NH)	5	0	7	6	40	0.03%	0.00%	0.04%	0.03%	0.22%
Mixed race or Multiracial (NH)	x	x	95	140	587	x	x	0.53%	0.79%	3.18%
Hispanic or Latino (any race)	70	49	478	814	1,016	0.47%	0.32%	2.69%	4.57%	5.50%
Total	14,934	15,419	17,774	17,818	18,470	100.00%	100.00%	100.00%	100.00%	100.00%

=== 2020 census ===
As of the 2020 census, there were 18,470 people and 5,081 families residing in the county.

The median age was 48.3 years, 18.2% of residents were under the age of 18, and 26.4% of residents were 65 years of age or older. For every 100 females there were 97.3 males, and for every 100 females age 18 and over there were 95.3 males age 18 and over.

The racial makeup of the county was 91.3% White, 0.6% Black or African American, 0.4% American Indian and Alaska Native, 0.2% Asian, <0.1% Native Hawaiian and Pacific Islander, 2.7% from some other race, and 4.7% from two or more races. Hispanic or Latino residents of any race comprised 5.5% of the population.

<0.1% of residents lived in urban areas, while 100.0% lived in rural areas.

There were 8,120 households in the county, of which 24.5% had children under the age of 18 living in them. Of all households, 52.2% were married-couple households, 17.6% were households with a male householder and no spouse or partner present, and 25.0% were households with a female householder and no spouse or partner present. About 29.4% of all households were made up of individuals and 15.9% had someone living alone who was 65 years of age or older.

There were 11,230 housing units, of which 27.7% were vacant. Among occupied housing units, 76.5% were owner-occupied and 23.5% were renter-occupied. The homeowner vacancy rate was 2.4% and the rental vacancy rate was 8.6%.

=== 2000 census ===
At the 2000 census, there were 17,774 people, 7,472 households, and 5,372 families residing in the county. The population density was 57 people per square mile (22 people/km^{2}). There were 9,729 housing units at an average density of 31 units per square mile (12 units/km^{2}). The racial makeup of the county was 97.99% White, 0.57% Black or African American, 0.34% Native American, 0.13% Asian, 0.41% from other races, and 0.56% from two or more races. 2.69% of the population were Hispanic or Latino of any race.

There were 7,472 households, out of which 27.30% had children under the age of 18 living with them, 61.20% were married couples living together, 7.80% had a female householder with no husband present, and 28.10% were non-families. 25.40% of all households were made up of individuals, and 12.50% had someone living alone who was 65 years of age or older. The average household size was 2.36 and the average family size was 2.81.

In the county, the population was spread out, with 21.20% under the age of 18, 7.00% from 18 to 24, 26.40% from 25 to 44, 27.10% from 45 to 64, and 18.20% who were 65 years of age or older. The median age was 42 years. For every 100 females there were 95.70 males. For every 100 females age 18 and over, there were 93.30 males.

The median income for a household in the county was $29,674, and the median income for a family was $35,879. Males had a median income of $26,800 versus $20,885 for females. The per capita income for the county was $16,335. About 10.90% of families and 15.80% of the population were below the poverty line, including 22.10% of those under age 18 and 16.30% of those age 65 or over.

=== Ancestry ===
As of 2015, the largest self-reported ancestry groups in Yancey County were:

Largest ancestries (2015)	Percent
English (England)	16.4%
American (United States)	16.2%
German (Germany)	15.1%
Irish (Republic of Ireland)	12.8%
Scottish (Scotland)	5.8%
Scotch-Irish (Ulster)	4.8%
Welsh (Wales)	2.0%
Dutch (Netherlands)	1.5%
French (except Basque) (France)	1.1%
Swedish (Sweden)	0.9%

== Government and politics ==
Yancey County is a member of the High Country Council of Governments.

United States presidential election results for Yancey County, North Carolina
Year	Republican		Democratic		Third party(ies)	
Year	No.	%	No.	%	No.	%
1912	60	2.72%	1,112	50.36%	1,036	46.92%
1916	1,082	45.94%	1,273	54.06%	0	0.00%
1920	2,596	53.24%	2,280	46.76%	0	0.00%
1924	2,156	45.21%	2,592	54.35%	21	0.44%
1928	2,712	52.27%	2,476	47.73%	0	0.00%
1932	2,396	41.19%	3,412	58.66%	9	0.15%
1936	2,691	42.76%	3,603	57.24%	0	0.00%
1940	2,516	41.90%	3,489	58.10%	0	0.00%
1944	2,402	42.12%	3,301	57.88%	0	0.00%
1948	2,282	39.13%	3,481	59.69%	69	1.18%
1952	2,953	44.43%	3,693	55.57%	0	0.00%
1956	2,808	48.65%	2,964	51.35%	0	0.00%
1960	3,284	49.80%	3,310	50.20%	0	0.00%
1964	2,004	35.05%	3,714	64.95%	0	0.00%
1968	2,448	45.21%	2,215	40.90%	752	13.89%
1972	3,106	57.10%	2,278	41.88%	56	1.03%
1976	2,688	40.43%	3,932	59.14%	29	0.44%
1980	3,363	44.57%	4,010	53.14%	173	2.29%
1984	4,296	53.96%	3,651	45.86%	14	0.18%
1988	4,160	52.00%	3,803	47.54%	37	0.46%
1992	3,994	43.38%	4,285	46.54%	929	10.09%
1996	3,973	45.75%	3,956	45.56%	755	8.69%
2000	4,970	56.71%	3,714	42.38%	80	0.91%
2004	4,940	52.38%	4,434	47.02%	57	0.60%
2008	5,045	51.92%	4,486	46.17%	186	1.91%
2012	5,278	55.85%	3,981	42.12%	192	2.03%
2016	6,385	64.11%	3,196	32.09%	379	3.81%
2020	7,516	66.21%	3,688	32.49%	148	1.30%
2024	7,509	66.55%	3,635	32.22%	139	1.23%

=== Law enforcement ===
The county has two law enforcement agencies. The Burnsville Police Department operates in the town limits, while the Yancey County Sheriff's Office has county-wide jurisdiction, aside from US Forest Service and State Park land, where law enforcement is provided by those respective agencies. State law enforcement agencies operating in the county, with offices in Burnsville, include the Highway Patrol (Troop G) and the Department of Adult Corrections and Juvenile Justice (Probation Officers and Juvenile Court Counselors). The State Bureau of Investigation assists the other agencies and investigates use of lethal force by law enforcement.

== Education ==
The Yancey County Schools system serves the K-12 public school students of the county. There are five members of the School Board, elected on even years to four year terms. Three seats are elected on presidential/gubernatorial election years, and two on midterm years. In 2017, the NC General Assembly passed a bill, sponsored by Rep. Michele Presnell, to change the YCS board elections from non-partisan to partisan. As of 2023, the partisan makeup of the board is four Republicans and one Democrat. Kathy Amos is the current superintendent.

In 2016, the YCS Board voted to consolidate three elementary schools in the west and north of the county (Bald Creek, Bee Log, and Clearmont) into one school, which was named Blue Ridge. At the time of its closure in 2018, Bee Log Elementary School was the smallest public school in the state with enrollment of 42. Bald Creek and Clearmont closed the following year. Yancey County schools currently consists of the following schools:

=== Elementary Schools (Grades K–5) ===
- Blue Ridge Elementary School
- Burnsville Elementary School
- South Toe Elementary School
- Micaville Elementary School (permanently closed due to Hurricane Helene)

=== Middle Schools (Grades 6–8) ===
- Cane River Middle School
- East Yancey Middle School

=== High School (Grades 9–12) ===
- Mountain Heritage High School

High school students in Yancey County have the option to enroll in Mayland Early College High School, located on the main campus of Mayland Community College in Spruce Pine. The program allows students to simultaneously complete their high school diploma and take college-level courses. While enrolled, students can earn college credits that count toward an Associate of Arts (AA) or an Associate of Science (AS) degree, depending on their course selection. This enables students to potentially graduate from high school having completed up to two years of college-level coursework, giving them a head start on higher education or career pathways. The Early College program is designed to reduce the total time and cost required for a college degree, provide exposure to college-level academics, and offer opportunities to explore career and academic interests.

There are two private schools in the county: Arthur Morgan School in Celo and Yancey County Christian School in Burnsville.

=== Higher Education ===
Mayland Community College serves the Toe River Valley counties of Avery, Mitchell, and Yancey. The main campus is in Spruce Pine, on the Avery-Mitchell line, but the Yancey Learning Center, a satellite campus, is just outside of the Burnsville town limits on the west side.

== Library ==
Avery-Mitchell-Yancey Regional Library (AMY) served the county, with the Yancey County Public Library branch located in Burnsville in the Yancey Collegiate Institute Historic District. The AMY system officially began in 1961. As a result of a Pride display, Yancey County commissioners began the process of taking over the library in June 2023. The library is set to become a county library on July 1, 2025. Some residents are suing. One reason given for opposing the change is the need to recover from Helene.

== Communities ==
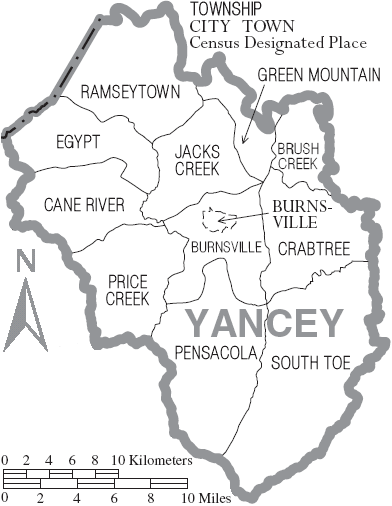
Map of Yancey County with municipal and township labels

=== Town ===
- Burnsville (county seat and largest community)

=== Townships ===
- Brush Creek
- Burnsville
- Cane River
- Crabtree
- Egypt
- Green Mountain
- Jacks Creek
- Pensacola
- Price's Creek
- Ramseytown
- South Toe

=== Unincorporated communities ===
- Bald Creek
- Bent Creek
- Busick
- Cane River
- Celo
- Day Book
- Green Mountain
- Hamrick
- Micaville
- Murchison
- Newdale
- Pensacola
- Ramseytown
- Sioux
- Swiss
- Windom

== See also ==
- List of counties in North Carolina
- National Register of Historic Places listings in Yancey County, North Carolina
- Yancey County News
- Parkway Playhouse
