= Burnsville, North Carolina =

- Town
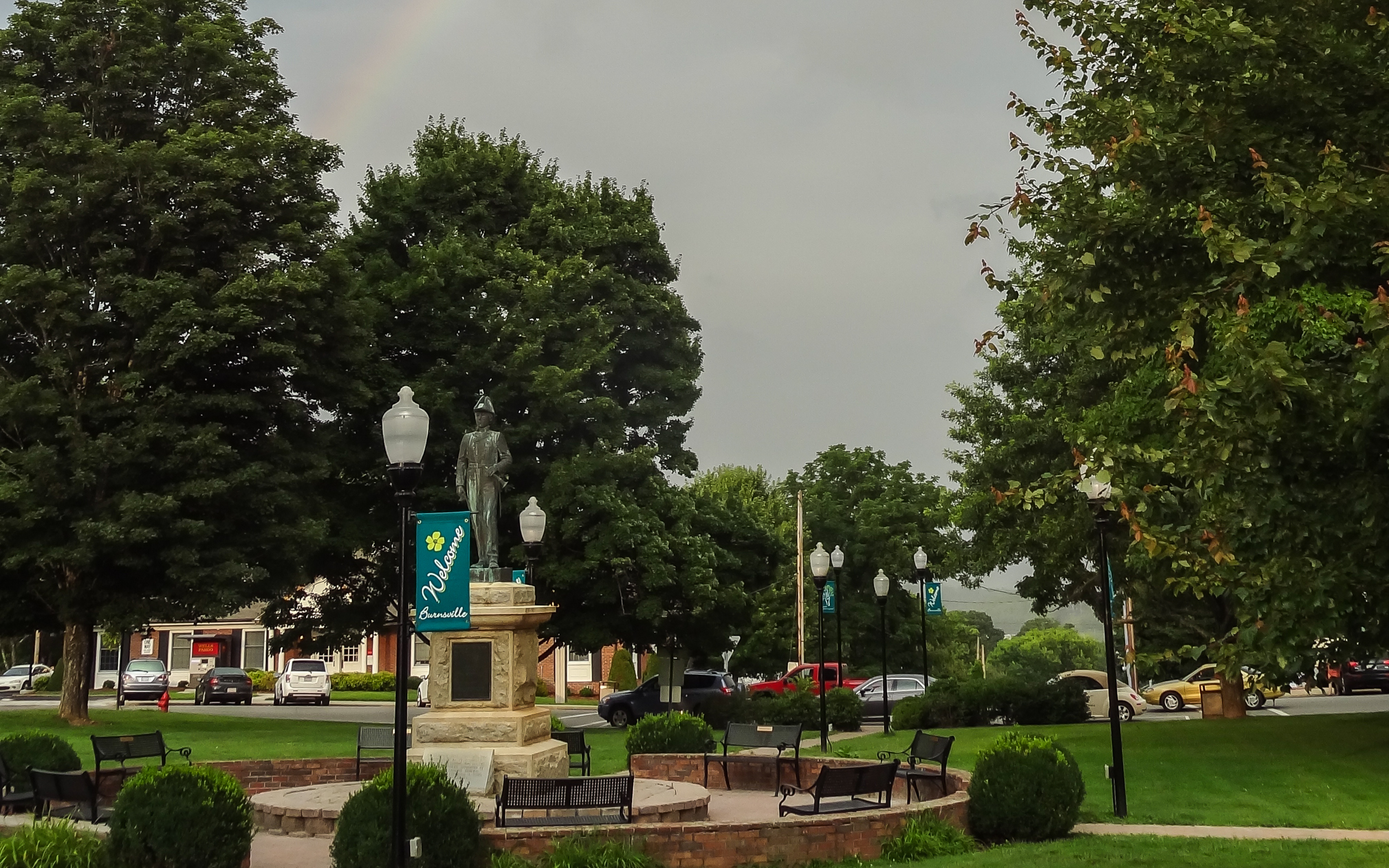
- Burnsville Town Square

- Seal

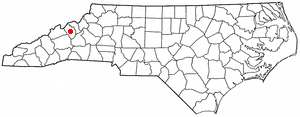
- Location of Burnsville, North Carolina
- Coordinates: 35°54′59″N 82°17′52″W
- Country: United States
- State: North Carolina
- County: Yancey
- Established: 1834

Area
  - Total: 1.60 sq mi (4.14 km^{2})
  - Land: 1.60 sq mi (4.14 km^{2})
  - Water: 0 sq mi (0.00 km^{2})
- Elevation: 2,749 ft (838 m)

Population (2020)
  - Total: 1,614
  - Density: 1,009/sq mi (389.4/km^{2})
- Time zone: UTC-5 (Eastern (EST))
  - Summer (DST): UTC-4 (EDT)
- ZIP code: 28714
- Area code: 828
- FIPS code: 37-09140
- GNIS feature ID: 2405350
- Website: townofburnsville.org

Burnsville is a town that serves as the county seat of Yancey County, North Carolina, United States. Located in the Blue Ridge Mountains of western North Carolina, it sits in the shadow of Mount Mitchell, the highest peak in the Eastern Continental United States. The population was 1,612 at the 2020 census.

== History ==
The town was founded on March 6, 1834, from land conveyed by John "Yellow Jacket" Bailey, and it was named after Captain Otway Burns, a naval hero of the War of 1812. In 1909, a statue of Captain Burns was given to the town by his grandson, Walter Francis Burns Sr., and it was set on a granite pedestal in the center of the town square. It has an inscription that reads, in part, "He Guarded Well Our Seas, Let Our Mountains Honor Him." Due to damages, the original statue was replaced in the early 2000s.

On April 6, 2010, Burnsville, the only incorporated town within Yancey County, held a referendum providing for the legal sale of alcohol within the town limits. The referendum passed. After applying for and receiving the applicable permits, Burnsville now operates an ABC store; some retail establishments now sell beer and wine; and a few restaurants sell beer, wine, and mixed drinks. Graham County is the last remaining fully dry county in the state of North Carolina.

In September 2024, Burnsville and the surrounding area was heavily impacted by Hurricane Helene and subsequent storm-induced landslides, resulting in devastating property and infrastructure damage to Yancey, Mitchell, and Avery Counties. Officials reported the damages and repairs to the area to be over $50 billion.

== Historic structures ==
One of the oldest buildings is the Nu-Wray Inn. It was built in 1833 and now, is listed on the National Register of Historic Places. The Parkway Playhouse, the oldest continually operating summer stock theater company in North Carolina, is located in Burnsville. It was founded in 1947 by W. R. Taylor, a professor of drama from the Woman's College of North Carolina-now the University of North Carolina-Greensboro, and a group of dedicated community leaders. Several other structures in Burnsvile are listed on the National Register of Historic Places. They include the Bald Creek Historic District, Chase-Coletta House, Citizens Bank Building, John Wesley McElroy House, Yancey Collegiate Institute Historic District, and Yancey County Courthouse.

== Annual fair ==
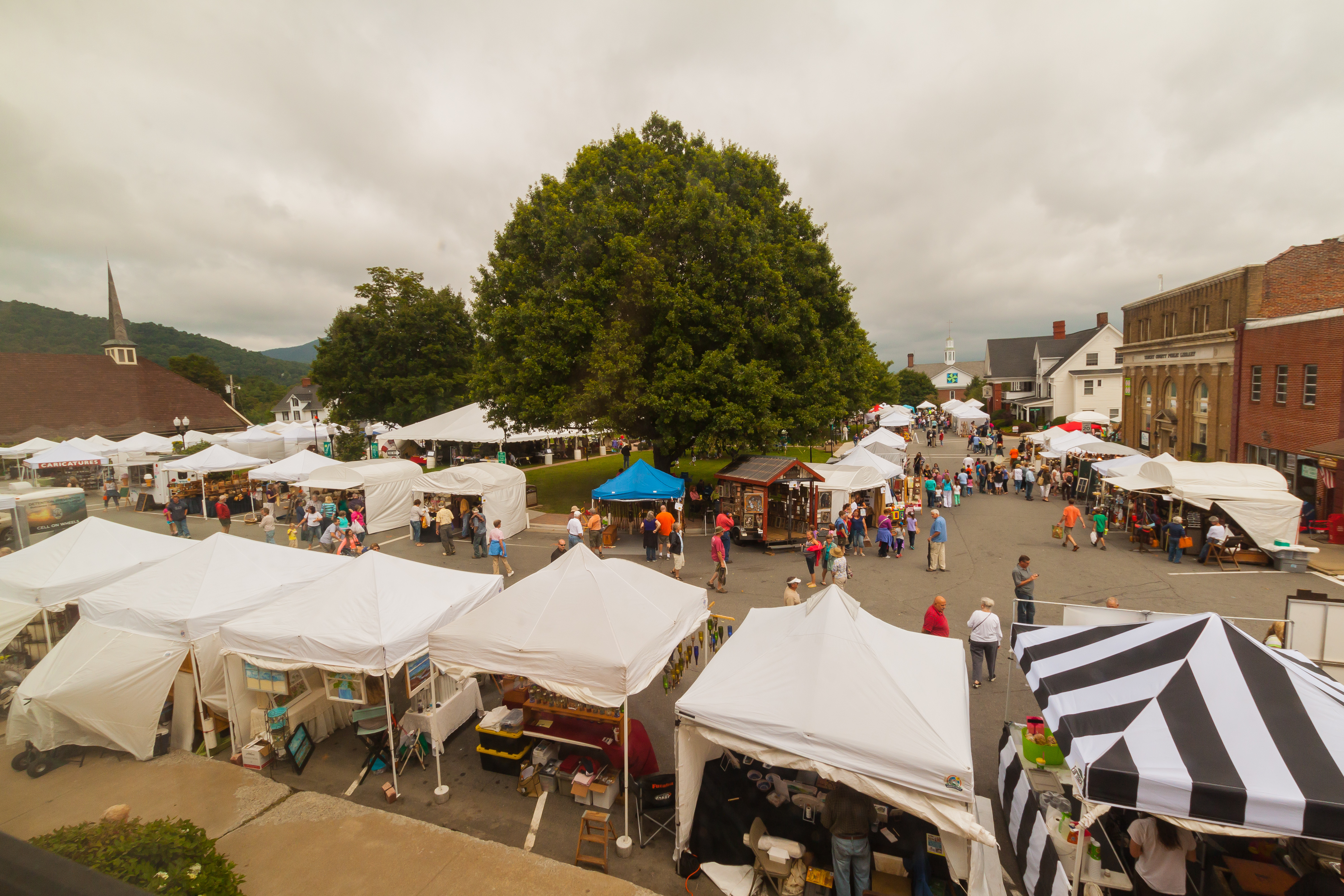
2014 Mt. Mitchell Crafts Fair

The Mt. Mitchell Craft Fair is held in Burnsville. This annual event, founded in 1956, attracts thousands of tourists and more than 200 vendors and performers. The fair is known for the local and visiting artisans who exhibit their handmade arts and crafts.

Established in 1956, The Mount Mitchell Arts & Crafts Fair is coordinated and sponsored by the Burnsville-Yancey Chamber of Commerce. It is the first Friday and Saturday in August in historic downtown Burnsville and features more than 200 vendors and performers. The event includes bluegrass and acoustic music, food vendors, and a unique selection of handmade arts and crafts from artisans across the country.

The Mt. Mitchell Arts & Crafts Fair brings together mountain heritage, traditional crafting, and contemporary art creating an event not to be missed.

== Geography ==
Burnsville is located in the mountains of western North Carolina, at 2,749 feet above sea level. It is on a tributary of the Cane River, just north of the Black Mountains, and 30 miles northeast of Asheville. U.S. Highway 19E runs through the town, leading to Interstate 26 and Mars Hill to the west and, to the east, to Spruce Pine.

According to the United States Census Bureau, the town has a total area of 1.6 square miles (4.1 km^{2}), all land.

== Demographics ==
Historical population
Census	Pop.	Note	%±
1900	207		—
1910	422		103.9%
1930	866		—
1940	997		15.1%
1950	1,341		34.5%
1960	1,388		3.5%
1970	1,348		−2.9%
1980	1,452		7.7%
1990	1,482		2.1%
2000	1,623		9.5%
2010	1,693		4.3%
2020	1,614		−4.7%
U.S. Decennial Census

=== 2020 census ===
As of the 2020 census, Burnsville had a population of 1,614. The median age was 49.6 years. 16.4% of residents were under the age of 18 and 30.0% of residents were 65 years of age or older. For every 100 females there were 88.6 males, and for every 100 females age 18 and over there were 84.4 males age 18 and over.

0.0% of residents lived in urban areas, while 100.0% lived in rural areas.

There were 737 households in Burnsville, of which 22.7% had children under the age of 18 living in them. There were 520 families residing in the town. Of all households, 37.7% were married-couple households, 19.0% were households with a male householder and no spouse or partner present, and 37.0% were households with a female householder and no spouse or partner present. About 41.4% of all households were made up of individuals and 23.8% had someone living alone who was 65 years of age or older.

There were 870 housing units, of which 15.3% were vacant. The homeowner vacancy rate was 2.5% and the rental vacancy rate was 7.6%.

Burnsville racial composition
Race	Number	Percentage
White (non-Hispanic)	1,374	85.13%
Black or African American (non-Hispanic)	26	1.61%
Native American	10	0.62%
Asian	11	0.68%
Pacific Islander	1	0.06%
Other/Mixed	51	3.16%
Hispanic or Latino	141	8.74%

=== 2000 census ===
As of the census of 2000, there were 1,623 people, 748 households, and 412 families residing in the town. The population density was 1,028.0 inhabitants per square mile (396.9/km^{2}). There were 845 housing units at an average density of 535.2 per square mile (206.6/km^{2}). The racial makeup of the town was 95.50% White, 1.91% African American, 0.49% Native American, 0.43% Asian, 0.86% from other races, and 0.80% from two or more races. Hispanic or Latino of any race were 3.88% of the population.

There were 748 households, out of which 21.9% had children under the age of 18 living with them, 41.2% were married couples living together, 11.6% had a female householder with no husband present, and 44.9% were non-families. 42.1% of all households were made up of individuals, and 25.1% had someone living alone who was 65 years of age or older. The average household size was 2.00 and the average family size was 2.70.

In the town, the population was spread out, with 18.1% under the age of 18, 5.7% from 18 to 24, 22.4% from 25 to 44, 23.2% from 45 to 64, and 30.7% who were 65 years of age or older. The median age was 48 years. For every 100 females, there were 75.3 males. For every 100 females age 18 and over, there were 70.8 males.

The median income for a household in the town was $21,653, and the median income for a family was $34,712. Males had a median income of $30,227 versus $25,234 for females. The per capita income for the town was $16,894. About 15.3% of families and 19.5% of the population were below the poverty line, including 24.2% of those under age 18 and 19.4% of those age 65 or over.

== Education ==
Burnsville is served by the Yancey County Schools System. Mountain Heritage High School, Yancey County's public high school is located outside the town limits to the west on Highway 19E, as is a satellite campus of Mayland Community College. Cane River Middle School lies to the west of the town limits. In 2019, Blue Ridge Elementary School was opened west of the town limits. Burnsville Elementary School and East Yancey Middle School lie to the east of the town limits.

== Economy ==
Altec and Glen Raven are manufacturing employers in Burnsville. Glen Raven is the only operating textile factory in the county. Formerly, Burnsville had two textile mills, with Avondale Mills and Glen Raven, Inc. each operating a mill in the town. The closures of the Avondale Mills facility and Taylor Togs' Micaville blue jeans factory occurred in 2004.

Mountain Gardens is a botanical garden on Shuford Creek Road, bordered by National Forest under the Black Mountains. Paradise is a 2025 documentary film about Joe Hollis and Mountain Gardens, by Garret Martin.

== Points of interest ==
- The Nu-Wray Inn has been used as a hotel since its construction in 1833.
- The Parkway Playhouse, founded in 1947, as a summer stock theatre, is one of the oldest continually operating theatre companies in North Carolina.
- John Wesley McElroy House, built circa 1830s, now is used as a museum.
- Mt. Mitchell, the tallest mountain east of the Mississippi River is located nearby in southern Yancey County.
- Mayland Earth to Sky Park offers views of the certified dark skies with its observatory and planetarium shows.

== Development ==
In 2006, the North Carolina Department of Transportation began widening U.S. 19 and U.S. 19E from a two-lane highway to a four-lane divided highway. The construction began at the junction of Interstate 26 in Madison County and continued to where U.S. 19E intersects with Jacks Creek Road. Construction on this section was completed and was dedicated on November 2, 2012. Work on widening the next section to the Micaville intersection was completed and opened to a four-lane traffic pattern over the weekend of October 29–30, 2016.
