= Shelby Bypass =

Highway in North Carolina

U.S. Highway 74 Bypass
- Shelby Bypass
- Opened segment of Shelby Bypass in red, segment under construction in orange

Route information
- Auxiliary route of US 74
- Maintained by NCDOT
- Length: 18.5 mi (29.8 km)
- History: First segment opened to traffic in 2020 with no designation

Major junctions
- West end: US 74 near Mooresboro
- NC 226 near Shelby; NC 18 near Shelby; NC 150 in Shelby
- East end: US 74 in Shelby

Location
- Country: United States
- State: North Carolina
- Counties: Cleveland

Highway system
- United States Numbered Highway System; List; Special; Divided; North Carolina Highway System; Interstate; US; State; Scenic

The Shelby Bypass, planned to be designated as U.S. Route 74 Bypass (US 74 Byp.), is a future 18.5-mile (29.8 km) four-lane freeway bypass of the city of Shelby along U.S. Route 74 (US 74) in Cleveland County in the U.S. state of North Carolina. It will begin at a trumpet interchange with US 74 west of Shelby, running along its northern city limits, before terminating at another trumpet interchange with US 74 on the southeast city limits of Shelby. The project will also include upgrading a stretch of US 74 from the eastern Shelby Bypass interchange to the diamond interchange with U.S. Route 74 Business (US 74 Bus.) just west of Kings Mountain. The bypass is currently under construction in six sections and is currently expected to be fully open to traffic in 2029.

As of June 2025, currently, the two segments of the bypass that are open to traffic are the 5.6-mile (9.0 km) segment between US 74 west of Shelby to North Carolina Highway 226 (NC 226; Polkville Road) on the northwestern edge of Shelby. This segment opened to traffic on April 13, 2020, but currently has no designation. The next segment, from NC 226 to North Carolina Highway 150 (NC 150; Cherryville Road) on the northeastern edge of Shelby, opened to traffic on June 16, 2025 at 5.3-mile (8.5 km). The last segment from west of Stony Point Road to US 74 Bus. in Kings Mountain began construction in 2023, with the entire bypass expected to be completed in 2029.

== Route description ==
The Shelby Bypass will begin at a trumpet interchange with U.S. Route 74 (US 74) west of Shelby, east of the town of Mooresboro. US 74 will exit the mainline highway, with through traffic following onto the bypass. The bypass then will curve northeastward, following the northwestern city limits of Shelby. It will have its first service interchange with Washburn Switch Road just outside the northwest tip of the Shelby city limits, with which it will have a parclo AB2 interchange with before crossing the Charlotte Subdivision. Continuing northeast, it will have another parclo AB2 interchange with North Carolina Highway 226 (NC 226; Polkville Road) northwest of Shelby city limits. It will continue on its trek northeastward, running alongside and just outside of Shelby city limits. At its diamond interchange with North Carolina Highway 18 (NC 18; Fallston Road) on the north side of Shelby, the bypass changes direction and begins traveling southeastward. Crossing the Charlotte Subdivision again, the bypass has another diamond interchange with North Carolina Highway 150 (NC 150; Cherryville Road) on the northeastern city limits of Shelby. Here, the bypass curves slightly more due south, running along the eastern side of Shelby and the western side of the Kings Mountain Reservoir (Moss Lake), through the unincorporated area of Light Oak. The bypass will end at another trumpet interchange with US 74 southeast of Shelby, with US 74 entering the mainline highway.

While not part of the bypass itself, the project will also include improving and converting the stretch of US 74 between the eastern terminus of the Shelby Bypass to the diamond interchange with U.S. Route 74 Business (US 74 Bus.) just west of Kings Mountain to a freeway. This will create a continuous freeway from just east of Mooresboro to Interstate 85 (I-85) and U.S. Route 29 (US 29) in Kings Mountain.

== History ==
The Shelby Bypass was planned in response to the growing traffic delays and accident rates along U.S. Route 74 (US 74) in the Shelby area, as well as stimulate local economic development. The current alignment of US 74 through Shelby is itself a bypass built to bypass Downtown Shelby. This was also done as part of the North Carolina Department of Transportation (NCDOT)'s plan to upgrade US 74 between Interstate 26 (I-26) at Columbus and Interstate 85 (I-85) and U.S. Route 29 (US 29) in Kings Mountain to a complete four-lane Interstate standard freeway. The Shelby Bypass is known by NCDOT as "Project #R-2707" and is expected to cost $284 million.

The Draft Environmental Impact Statement (EIS) was approved by the Federal Highway Administration (FHWA) and NCDOT in October 1998. In December 2006, a Land Use Management Plan was published by local leaders. The Final EIS was approved in January 2008. The chosen proposed route (selected alternative) of the Shelby Bypass, known as Alternate 21, or the Southern Alternate, was chosen by a decision by the FHWA and NCDOT in October 2008 due to it being determined to be the Least Environmentally Damaging Practicable Alternative (LEDPA) since it has fewer impacts on surrounding prime farmlands, wetlands, noise, costs cheaper to construct, and is consistent with local land use plans and policies. It was approved in December 2008. The City of Shelby has also been planning "Small Area Plans" which aim to plan the land use around the locations of the future interchanges to account for the expected new traffic.

On June 15, 2020, U.S. Senator of North Carolina Thom Tillis announced that the United States Department of Transportation had awarded a $25 million Infrastructure For Rebuilding America (INFRA) Grant to NCDOT to help fund improvements along the US 74 corridor, which includes the Shelby Bypass.

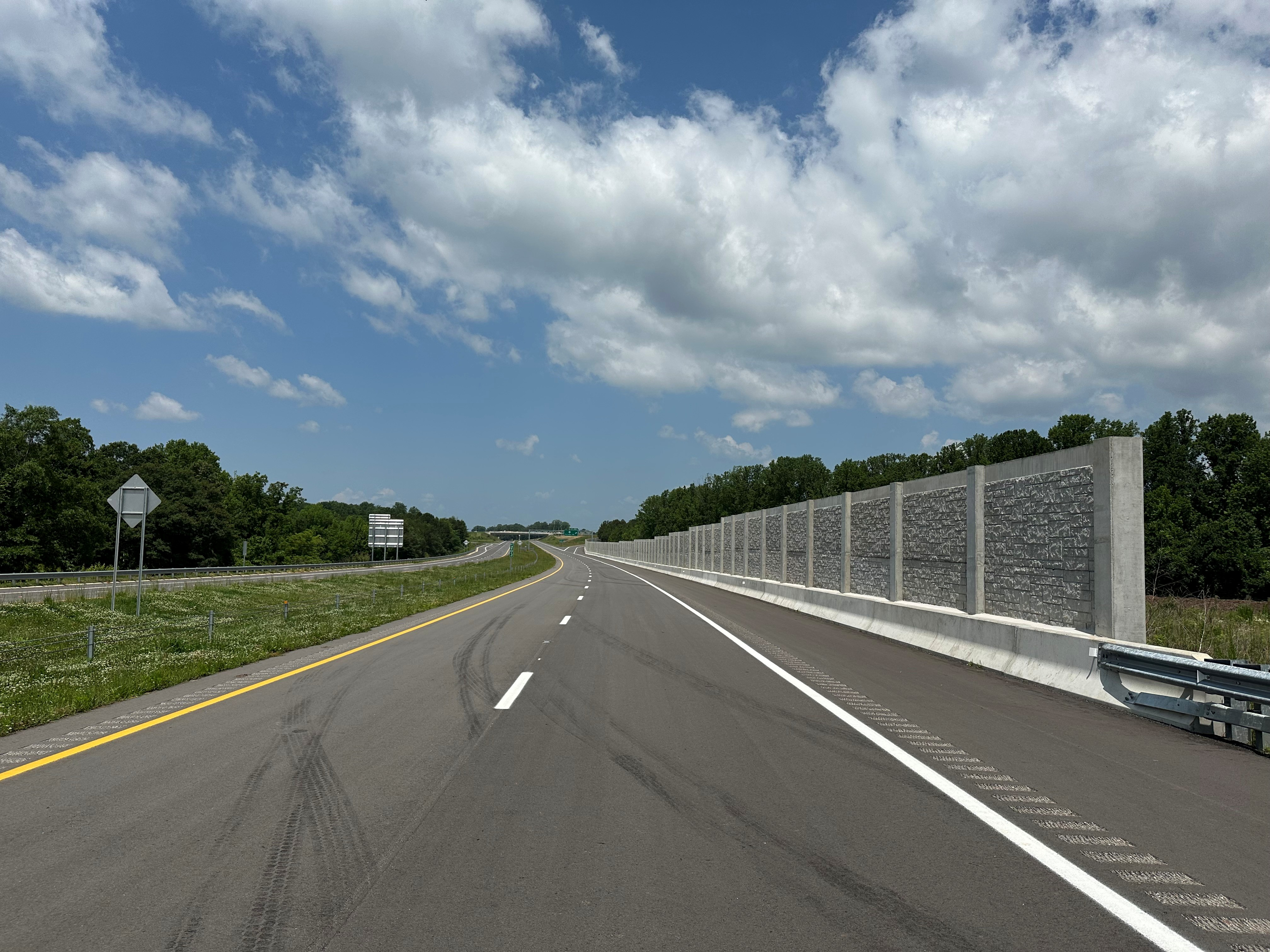
Noise wall near Fallston Road

Construction on the first 2-mile (3.2 km) section of the bypass, Section R-2707AA, which runs from west of Peachtree Road to east of Kimbrell Drive (now Westlee Street) near the town of Mooresboro began in July 2013 and was completed in September 2016. This section involved the construction of the western trumpet interchange with U.S. Route 74 (US 74) west of Shelby. Construction on the next two sections, Sections R-2707AB and R-2707B, began in July 2014 and was completed in April 2018. The first of these two sections extended from east of Kimbrell Drive (now Westlee Street) to east of Plato Lee Road and was 1.9 miles (3.1 km) in length. The second extended from east of Plato Lee Road to east of North Carolina Highway 226 (NC 226; Polkville Road) and was 2.6 miles (4.2 km) in length. All three sections, which all add up to 5.6 miles (9.0 km), were opened to traffic together after the paving was completed on April 13, 2020. AMT Engineering, a firm based in Rockville, Maryland, provided construction, engineering and inspection for these three sections, while the E.S. Wagner Company, a firm based in Charlotte, was awarded the contracts to construct these three sections.

Construction on the next section, Section R-2707C, which runs from east of NC 226 to west of North Carolina Highway 150 (NC 150; Cherryville Road) began in January 2017 and opened to traffic on June 16, 2025. This section is 5.3 miles (8.5 km) in length.

Section R-2707D, which extends from west of NC 150 to US 74 southeast of Shelby and is 4.1 miles (6.6 km) in length, along with Section R-2707E, which extends from US 74 southeast of Shelby to the west of Stony Point Road at U.S. Route 74 Business (US 74 Bus.) in Kings Mountain have both had their final designs and right of way acquisition completed, and construction began in 2023 with its completion set for 2029. Section R-2707D concerns the easternmost portion of the bypass, while Section R-2707E concerns the section of mainline US 74 between the bypass and Kings Mountain that will be converted into a full freeway.

=== Controversy ===
The Shelby Bypass project has been particularly controversial locally due to issues caused by construction on the bypass affecting nearby homeowners over the years, such as eminent domain, taxes, land use, the delayed timeframe of the project, concerns over local impacts, local traffic access changes, and surface runoff. Due to this, there have been plenty of lawsuits that were filed against NCDOT.

Due to road damage sustained from local hurricanes in recent years, NCDOT has shifted its priority from constructing new roads to repairing existing ones. This has delayed the completion of local projects, including the Shelby Bypass.

The construction of the Shelby Bypass is expected to negatively impact the survival of Hexastylis naniflora, a rare species of flowering plant endemic to the region, with over 3,000 plants expected to be lost, while over 2,000 more will be indirectly impacted, according to a 2012 report by NCDOT to the United States Fish and Wildlife Service (USFWS).

== Exit list ==
Exit numbers follow the mileage of U.S. Route 74 (US 74). The entire route is in Cleveland County.

Location	mi	km	Exit	Destinations	Notes
	194	312	194	US 74 east – Shelby	Continuation as US 74; opened to traffic on April 13, 2020
	197	317	197	Washburn Switch Road	Opened to traffic on April 13, 2020
	199	320	199	NC 226 (Polkville Road)	Opened to traffic on April 13, 2020
	202	325	202	NC 18 (Fallston Road)	Opened to traffic on June 16, 2025
Shelby	203	327	203	NC 150 to NC 180 (Cherryville Road)	Opened to traffic on June 16, 2025
Shelby	208	335	208	US 74 west	
1.000 mi = 1.609 km; 1.000 km = 0.621 mi: Unopened
