= Disappearance of Asha Degree =

2000 U.S. missing persons case

Coordinates: 35.34647°N 81.50738°W

Asha Degree
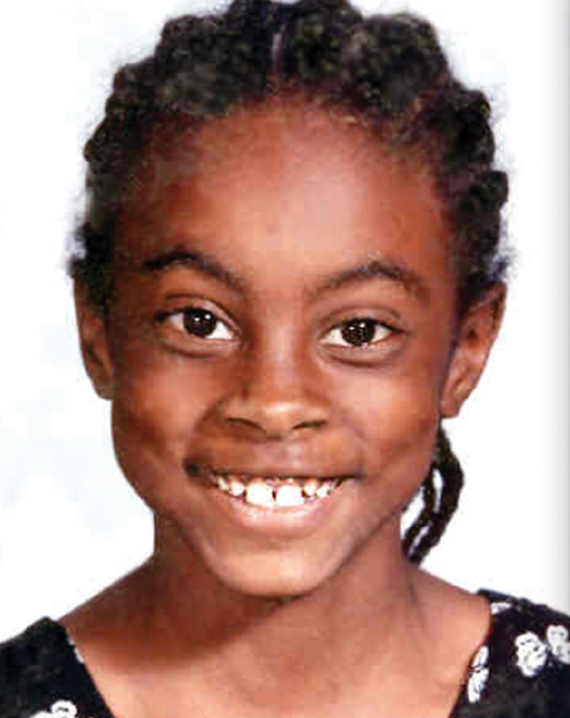
- Degree in May 1999
- Born: Asha Jaquilla Degree; August 5, 1990; Shelby, North Carolina, U.S.
- Disappeared: February 14, 2000 (aged 9); Shelby, North Carolina, U.S.
- Status: Missing for 26 years and 8 months
- Height: 4 ft 6 in (137 cm)
- Parents: Harold Degree (father); Iquilla Degree (mother)

On February 14, 2000, Asha Jaquilla Degree, a nine‑year‑old girl from Shelby, North Carolina, United States, disappeared after leaving her family's home during the early morning hours. For reasons that remain unknown, she packed a bookbag and walked along North Carolina Highway 18 in heavy rain and wind. Several motorists reported seeing her; when one driver attempted to approach her about 1.3 miles (2.1 km) from her home, she left the roadside and ran into a wooded area. Her parents discovered her missing later that morning, and she has never been seen again.

An extensive search located some of her personal belongings near the area where she was last observed, and in 2001 her bookbag was found buried at a construction site along Highway 18 in Morganton. A billboard now stands at the point where she entered the woods, and her family holds an annual walk from their home to the site to maintain public awareness of the case.

Although early circumstances suggested the possibility that Degree had run away, investigators found no clear explanation for such an action and later concluded that she had been abducted after leaving the home. The case has received national media attention. In 2015, the Federal Bureau of Investigation joined state and county authorities in a renewed investigation and offered a reward for information leading to a resolution.

In February 2025, the case was reclassified as a homicide investigation, and suspects were publicly identified following a series of searches, the most recent of which occurred in April 2025.

== Background ==
Harold and Iquilla Degree married on Valentine's Day in 1988. Their son, O'Bryant, was born a year later; Asha was born on August 5, 1990. The Degrees raised both children in their house on Oakcrest Drive in a residential subdivision amidst a generally rural area north of Shelby, North Carolina, on the western edge of the Charlotte metropolitan area. Both worked regular jobs nearby; Harold was a dock loader at Pittsburgh Plate Glass and Iquilla worked for Kawai America Manufacturing building pianos. The children let themselves in after school, where their parents expected that they would either be doing their homework or finished with it by the time they returned.

They made sure their children were insulated from outside influences and had a life centered around their extended family, church, and school. The Degrees did not have a computer in the house. "[E]very time you turned on the TV there was some pedophile who had lured somebody's child away, via the Internet," Iquilla recalled in a 2013 Jet interview. Iquilla said Asha handled this well; she was cautious, shy, and content mostly to stay within the limits her parents set. "She was scared to death of dogs," she recalled years later. "I never thought she would go out of the house."

Asha was in fourth grade at nearby Fallston Elementary School, going into a three-day weekend on the second week of February 2000. The Cleveland County Schools were closed on Friday, February 11, while the Degrees still had to work; the children spent the day at their aunt's house in the same neighborhood, from which they went to their youth basketball practices at their school. The following day, Asha's basketball team, on which she was a star point guard, lost its first game of the season. Asha had fouled out. Her parents recalled that she was somewhat upset about this, crying along with her teammates afterwards, but seemed to have gotten over it and watched her brother's game later that day.

== Disappearance ==
Locations
1 Shortly after 00:30/02:30 Degree leaves Oakcrest Drive home.
2 03:45-04:15 motorists sightings.
3 Turners shed where belongings found outside.
4 Truck driver sighting.

On February 13, a Sunday, the children went to church from a relative's house and then returned home. Around 8 p.m. that night, both children went to bed in the room they shared. Almost an hour later, the power went out in the neighborhood after a nearby car accident. The power came back on at 12:30 a.m., at which time Harold checked on his children and saw both Asha and O'Bryant asleep in their beds. He checked again shortly before he went to bed at 2:30 a.m. on February 14 and again saw them both.

Shortly afterwards, O'Bryant, then age 10, recalls hearing Asha's bed squeak. He did not further rouse himself, as he assumed she was merely changing positions in her sleep. Apparently around this time, Asha got out of bed, taking a bookbag she had previously packed with several sets of clothes and personal items, and left the house. Between 3:45 and 4:15 a.m., a truck driver and a motorist saw her walking south along Highway 18, wearing a long-sleeved white T-shirt and white pants, just north of its junction with Highway 180. They reported this to police after seeing a TV report about her disappearance. The motorist said that he turned his car around because he thought it was "strange such a small child would be out by herself at that hour". He circled three times and saw Degree run into the woods by the roadside and disappear. It was a rainy night, and the witness said there was a "storm raging" when he saw her. County sheriff Dan Crawford said, "We're pretty sure it was her because the descriptions they gave are consistent with what we know she was wearing." He added that they also saw her at the same place, heading the same direction.

Iquilla awoke at 5:45 a.m. to get the children ready for school that morning. This involved drawing a bath for them because they had not been able to take one the night before due to the power outage. When she opened the children's room to wake them up before their 6:30 alarm and call them to the bath, O'Bryant was in his bed; Asha was not, and Iquilla was unable to find her in the house or in the family cars. She told Harold she could not find their daughter. He suggested Asha might have gone over to his mother's house across the street; when Iquilla called there, her sister-in-law said Asha was not there. "That's when I went into panic mode. I heard a car next door ... I put shoes on and ran outside." Iquilla called her mother, who told her to call the police.

== Search ==
By 6:40 a.m., the first police officers had arrived on the scene. Police dogs called to the scene could not pick up Asha's scent. Iquilla went through the neighborhood calling Asha's name, which she said had awakened everyone by 7 a.m. Friends, family, and neighbors canceled their plans for the day to assist police in searching the vicinity while the pastor of their church, along with other area clergymen, came to the Degrees' home to support them. By day's end, all that had been found was a mitten, which Iquilla Degree said did not belong to her daughter, noting that no winter clothing had been taken from the house. Local news coverage prompted the two drivers who had seen Asha walking along the road early that morning, including the one whose attempt to approach her apparently prompted Asha to flee into the woods, to report the sightings to police.

On February 15, candy wrappers were found in a shed at a nearby business along the highway, near where Asha had been seen running into the woods. Along with them were a pencil, a green marker, and a yellow hairbow that were identified by her parents as belonging to her. Also found was a wallet-size photograph of a girl the Degrees did not recognize; in 2001, the Charlotte Observer reported the photo depicted a friend of Asha's. These materials were the only trace of her found during the initial search. On February 16, Iquilla realized that Asha's bedroom was missing her favorite clothing, including a pair of blue jeans with a red stripe. A week later the search was called off, after 9,000 man hours had been invested in a search of the 2–3-mile-radius (3.2–4.8 km) of where she had last been seen, flyers had been posted all over the area, and 300 leads had been submitted that ranged from possible sightings to tips about abandoned houses and wells where Asha might have ended up. "We have never really had that first good, substantial lead," said county sheriff Dan Crawford at a news conference. He urged the media to keep the story alive.

== Later developments ==
At the news conference on February 22, 2000, Crawford said he was going "long-range" with the search for Asha. Both the Federal Bureau of Investigation (FBI) and North Carolina's State Bureau of Investigation (SBI) got involved and put her on their respective databases of missing children. While the agencies were done searching in the area of her home and route, "we're following everything," Crawford insisted.

From Iquilla's account of what Asha had taken with her, investigators believed she had planned and prepared for this departure over the several days preceding her disappearance. "She's not your typical runaway," observed SBI agent Bart Burpeau. Another expert, Ben Ermini of the National Center for Missing & Exploited Children, noted that most children who run away are at least 12. An FBI agent also pointed to the lack of an issue she might have been running away from, such as a dysfunctional family or poor academic performance. Still, investigators believed that was the most likely explanation for her departure, but that for some reason, she either got off track or was abducted.

The media attention went national. A month after Asha's disappearance, the Degree family appeared on The Montel Williams Show to call attention to the case. America's Most Wanted and The Oprah Winfrey Show also devoted segments to it.

In March 2000, police erected a full-size color billboard, featuring Degree's image and identifying information, along Highway 18, near where Degree was last seen.

In May 2001, stock car racing driver Travis Kittleson featured an image of Degree on the hood of his car for an event in Concord, North Carolina, which was broadcast live on TNN. Kittleson said, "We've got a perfect opportunity to put Asha's picture on our car and maybe, with any luck, we can help bring her home."

In August 2001, Asha's bookbag and other items were discovered during a construction project off Highway 18 in Burke County, near Morganton, about 26 miles (42 km) north of Shelby. It was wrapped in two black trash bags. The worker who found it said the bookbag contained Asha's name and phone number. The FBI took it to their laboratory in Quantico, Virginia, for further forensic analysis. In February 2020, on the 20th anniversary of Asha's disappearance, the FBI confirmed that the bookbag contained a copy of Dr. Seuss's McElligot's Pool and a T-shirt depicting the band New Kids on the Block. Neither appeared to have been her property before they were found in her bag; the book was from the library at her elementary school.

For many years afterward, leads turned out to be dead ends. In 2004, acting on a tip reportedly received from an inmate at the county jail, the sheriff's office began digging at an intersection in Lawndale. The bones that were found turned out to be from an animal.

In 2005, Degree's image was featured on the work vehicles of two North Carolina companies: Servpro, a water cleanup and restoration service, and Republic GDS, a waste pick up service. Republic GDS's area president, Drew Isenhour, stated, "We are doing this for one reason and one reason only, and that is to find Asha Degree. Then we can move forward and help other missing children as well." An age progressed photo of Degree, created by the FBI, was featured on 28 vehicles for a period of 30 to 60 days.

External image
- Age progression of Degree to age 29

The Degrees took steps to keep Asha's memory, and the case, alive in the public's mind. In 2008, they established a scholarship in her name for a deserving local student. They host an annual walk to raise awareness and money to fund their search. The walk starts at their home and ends at a missing person's billboard for Asha along Highway 18, near where she was last seen. It was originally held on February 14, but it was changed to February 7 in 2015 and February 6 in 2016, as Harold and Iquilla felt it was not fair to participants to make Valentine's Day a somber occasion. Pictures of Asha, both real and those showing her as she might appear in later years created by investigators to help the search, still decorate the Degree house. "I fully expect her to walk through the door," Iquilla says.

Iquilla Degree lamented in a 2013 interview with Jet that her daughter's disappearance had not gotten as much media attention over the years as some subsequent cases of missing children because Asha was Black. "Missing white children get more attention. I don't understand why," she said. "I know if you ask them they will say it's not racial. Oh, really? I'm not going to argue because I have common sense."

In February 2015, the FBI announced that FBI agents, Cleveland County Sheriff's Office (CCSO) investigators, and SBI agents were re-examining the case and re-interviewing witnesses. They also announced a reward of up to $25,000 for "information leading to the arrest and conviction of the person or persons responsible for her disappearance." A community group is offering an additional $20,000 reward. The FBI announced 15 months later, in May 2016, that their reinvestigation of the case had turned up a possible new lead. They disclosed that Asha may have been seen getting into a dark green early 1970s Lincoln Continental Mark IV, or possibly a Ford Thunderbird from the same era, along Route 18 near where she was last seen later that night. It was described as having rust around its wheel wells.

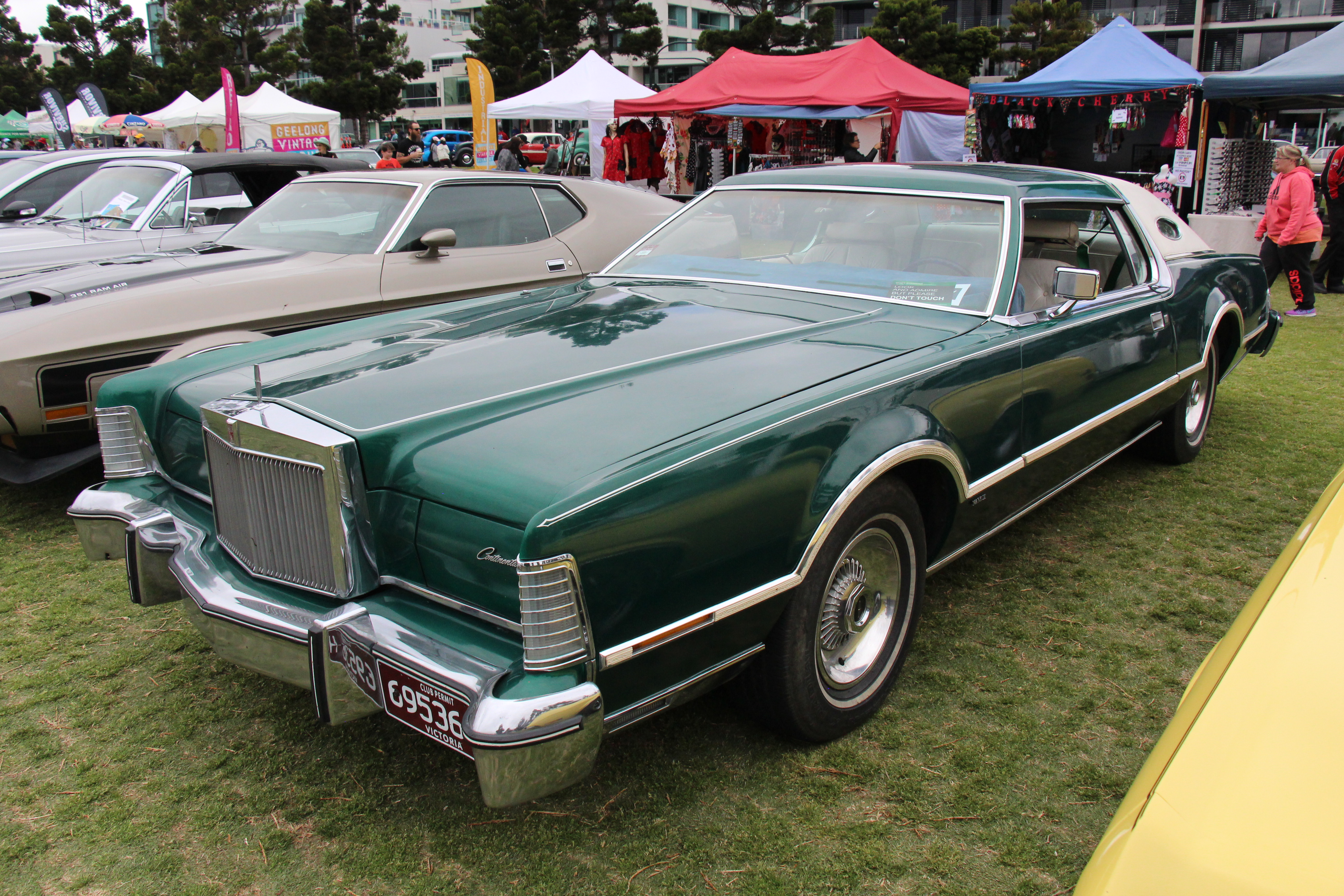
Dark green Lincoln Continental Mark IV, similar to the one Degree was seen entering

In September 2017, the FBI announced that its Child Abduction Rapid Deployment (CARD) team was in Cleveland County to assist in the investigation and "provide on-the-ground investigative, technical, behavioral analysis, and analytical support to find out more about what happened to Asha". The team worked alongside FBI Charlotte employees, CCSO investigators, and North Carolina SBI agents for ten days. The agencies also meet "several times a month to go over the latest on the investigation." Since September 2017, local agents and investigators have conducted approximately 300 interviews.

In October 2018, the CCSO detectives appealed for information from the public about two items of interest that were found in Degree's bookbag: McElligot's Pool, a children's book by Dr. Seuss, which was borrowed from the Fallston Elementary School library in early 2000, and a New Kids on the Block concert T-shirt. An investigator said the items are vital clues.

In November 2020, an inmate named Marcus Mellon, who had been convicted of sex crimes against children six years earlier, wrote a letter to The Shelby Star, claiming that Degree was murdered and he knew where to find her. Two months later, Cleveland County Sheriff Alan Norman announced that Mellon's claims had led to another dead end.

In September 2024, a search warrant was executed by the CCSO and the FBI in relation to the case. A news release from the sheriff's office said the warrant was issued based on physical evidence. No human remains were recovered, but multiple items of interest, including a green 1964 AMC Rambler, were taken from the site. The search warrant indicates that authorities believe Degree was a homicide victim and that her body has been concealed.

On February 13, 2025, the CCSO executed three search warrants, seizing cellphones from a local man and two of his children. Five days later, the warrants were made public and included text message exchanges between the suspects that were obtained from a search warrant the previous October. On April 4, a property "once owned by a prominent figure in the investigation" was searched by investigators.

In April 2026, it was reported that five members of the same family "have all been named as suspects" in Degree's disappearance. An FBI spokesperson wrote that the "Cleveland County Sheriff's Office, the FBI and the SBI continue to tirelessly investigate this case" but that law enforcement could not provide additional information about DNA testing, evidence or ongoing investigative activity.

== See also ==
- List of people who disappeared mysteriously (2000–present)
