= South Carolina Highway 198 =

State highway in South Carolina, United States

South Carolina Highway 198
- Mountain Street

Route information
- Maintained by SCDOT
- Length: 2.660 mi (4.281 km)
- Existed: 1940–present

Major junctions
- West end: I-85 / SC 5 in Blacksburg
- East end: NC 198 at the North Carolina state line near Earl, NC

Location
- Country: United States
- State: South Carolina
- Counties: Cherokee

Highway system
- South Carolina State Highway System; Interstate; US; State; Scenic
← SC 194	→ SC 200

South Carolina Highway 198 (SC 198) is a 2.660-mile (4.281 km) primary state highway in the U.S. state of South Carolina. It connects the town of Blacksburg at Interstate 85 (I-85) exit 102 and the northern terminus of SC 5 with the town of Earl, North Carolina by way of North Carolina Highway 198 (NC 198). Though it physically travels north and south, internal SCDOT data and the only signage of SC 198 at the I-85/SC 5 interchange indicates that it travels east–west.

== Route description ==
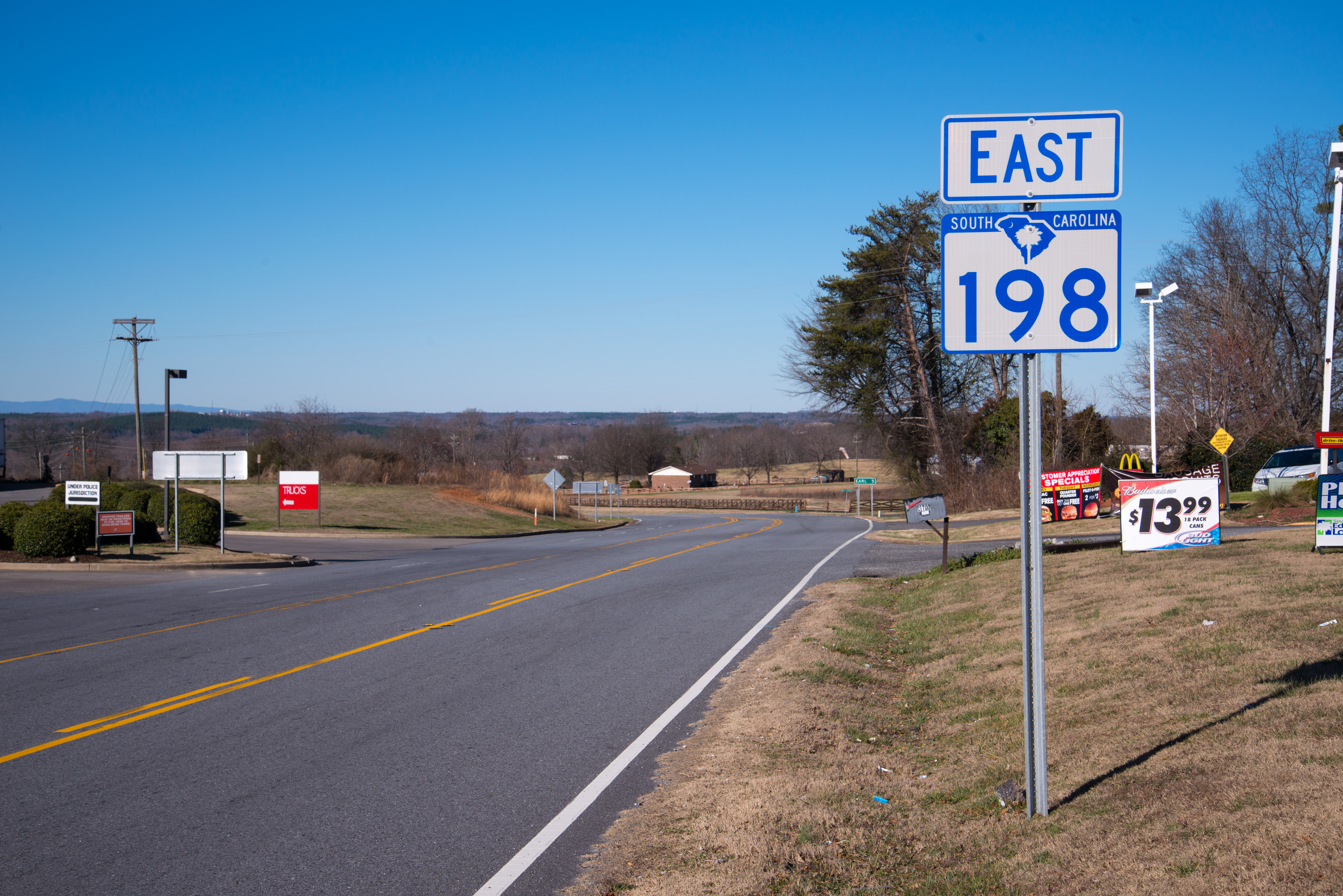
SC 198 in Blacksburg

A two-lane rural highway, it traverses 2.66 miles (4.28 km), starting in Blacksburg, it goes north to the North Carolina state line at Buffalo Creek. The highway continues towards Earl and eventually to Patterson Springs.

== History ==
Established in 1940, but designated later in 1951, SC 198 was 3.8-mile-long (6.1 km) and ran from U.S. Route 29/SC 5 to the North Carolina state line. Around 2006-2009, its southern terminus was shortened to I-85 and to a new western terminus of SC 5, which its southern section was designated too.

== Major intersections ==
The entire route is in Cherokee County.

Location	mi	km	Destinations	Notes
Blacksburg	0.000	0.000	I-85 / SC 5 south (Mountain Street) / Rock Springs Road – Spartanburg, Charlotte, Blacksburg	Western terminus of SC 198; northern terminus of SC 5; I-85 exit 102
	2.660	4.281	NC 198 north – Earl	Continuation into North Carolina
1.000 mi = 1.609 km; 1.000 km = 0.621 mi
