= Cleveland County Schools =

School district in North Carolina, United States

Location
- Cleveland County, North Carolina United States

District information
- Type: Public
- Grades: 5
- Established: 2004
- Superintendent: Dr. Chris Bennett
- Accreditation: AdvancED
- Schools: 29
- Budget: $ 218,366,000
- NCES District ID: 3700900

Students and staff
- Students: 14,504
- Teachers: 931.70 (on FTE basis)
- Staff: 984.60 (on FTE basis)
- Student–teacher ratio: 15.57:1

Other information
- Website: www.clevelandcountyschools.org

Cleveland County Schools is a PK–12 graded school district serving Cleveland County, North Carolina. The system was formed from the merger of Kings Mountain City Schools, Shelby City Schools and the former Cleveland County Schools system in 2004. Its 29 schools serve 16,417 students as of the 2010–2011 school year.

The school district covers the entire county.

== History ==
Originally, the cities of Kings Mountain and Shelby had their own school districts separate from Cleveland County Schools. In 2000, the school boards and the Cleveland County Commission approved a merger plan to consolidate the three systems into one. The State Board of Education approved the measure, however, the school board of the Kings Mountain School District filed suit to stop the merger. The courts did not accept their positions and the merger officially occurred in 2004.

== Student demographics ==
For the 2010–2011 school year, Cleveland County Schools had a total population of 16,417 students and 1,130.81 teachers on a (FTE) basis. This produced a student-teacher ratio of 14.52:1. That same year, out of the student total, the gender ratio was 52% male to 48% female. The demographic group makeup was: Black, 26%; White, 64%; Hispanic, 4%; Asian/Pacific Islander, 1%; and American Indian, 0% (two or more races: 5%). For the same school year, 59.84% of the students received free and reduced-cost lunches.

== Governance ==
The primary governing body of Cleveland County Schools follows a council–manager government format with a nine-member Board of Education appointing a Superintendent to run the day-to-day operations of the system. The school system currently resides in the North Carolina State Board of Education's Sixth District.

=== Board of education ===
The nine members of the Board of Education generally meet on the second Monday of each month.

=== Superintendent ===
The current superintendent of the system is Dr. Stephen Fisher. He became superintendent July 1, 2014. He followed Dr. Bruce Boyles who became superintendent in 2007 after spending 26 years in various positions in the Mooresville Graded School District. Boyles replaces Gene Moore who resigned the position to accept a superintendent position in Lancaster County, South Carolina and the interim superintendent, Steve Borders. Moore was the first superintendent of the newly merged system.

== Schools ==
Cleveland County Schools has 29 schools ranging from pre-kindergarten to twelfth grade, comprising five high schools, two alternative schools, four middle schools, two intermediate schools (grades 5 and 6), and sixteen elementary schools.

=== High schools ===
- Burns High School (Lawndale)
- Crest High School (Boiling Springs)
- Cleveland Early College High School (Shelby)
- Kings Mountain High School (Kings Mountain)
- Shelby High School (Shelby)

=== Middle schools ===
- Burns Middle School (Lawndale)
- Crest Middle School (Boiling Springs)
- Kings Mountain Middle School; grades 7–8 (Kings Mountain)
- Shelby Middle School; grades 7–8 (Shelby)

=== Elementary schools ===
- Bethware Elementary School (Kings Mountain)
- Boiling Springs Elementary School (Boiling Springs)
- Casar Elementary School (Casar)
- East Elementary School (Kings Mountain)
- Elizabeth Elementary School (Shelby)
  - Elizabeth Elementary was at one point converted into Shelby Intermediate School when the district began using a separate grade configuration. In 2022 the building reverted to being Elizabeth Elementary. That year, it took students from the former Graham and Marion elementary schools.
- Fallston Elementary School (Fallston)
- Grover Elementary School (Grover)
- Jefferson Elementary School (Shelby)
- Kings Mountain Intermediate School; grades 5–6 (Kings Mountain)
- James Love Elementary School (Shelby)
- North Elementary School (Kings Mountain)
- Springmore Elementary School (Shelby postal address, west of Shelby)
- Township Three Elementary School (Shelby postal address, south of Shelby)
- Union Elementary School (Shelby postal address, northwest of Shelby)
- Washington Elementary School (Waco)
- West Elementary School (Kings Mountain)

=== Alternative schools ===
- Turning Point Academy; alternative school, grades 6–12 (Shelby)
- North Shelby School; special education, grades PK–12 (Shelby)

=== Closed schools ===
- Graham Elementary School (Shelby) - Closed in 2022
- Marion Elementary School (Shelby) - Closed in 2022
- Shelby Intermediate School (Shelby) - Was converted from Elizabeth Elementary into Shelby Intermediate. It was converted back into being Elizabeth Elementary in 2022.

== Athletics ==
According to the North Carolina High School Athletic Association, for the 2012–2013 school year:

- Shelby High is a 2A school in the South Mountain Athletic Conference.
- Burns High is a 3A school in the South Mountain Athletic Conference.
- Crest and Kings Mountain high schools are 3A schools in the Big South Conference.
- Turning Point Academy and Cleveland Early College do not have athletic teams.

== Awards ==
The Cleveland County Schools system has had three schools listed as Blue Ribbon Schools: Crest High School (1986–87), Jefferson Elementary School (2008), and East Elementary School (2008). The system was included on the College Board's AP Honor Roll in 2013.

One teacher in the school system has been recognized as a North Carolina Department of Public Instruction Teacher of the Year: Frances A. Kiser (1974–75).

== See also ==
- List of school districts in North Carolina
