= North Carolina Highway 198 =

State highway in Cleveland County, North Carolina, US

North Carolina Highway 198
- Blacksburg Road

Route information
- Maintained by NCDOT
- Length: 4.3 mi (6.9 km)
- Existed: 1952–present

Major junctions
- South end: SC 198 at the South Carolina state line near Earl
- North end: NC 180 near Patterson Springs

Location
- Country: United States
- State: North Carolina
- Counties: Cleveland

Highway system
- North Carolina Highway System; Interstate; US; State; Scenic
| ← NC 197 | → NC 200 |

North Carolina Highway 198 (NC 198) is a primary state highway in the U.S. state of North Carolina. It connects the town of Earl with the rest of Cleveland County.

== Route description ==
A two-lane rural highway, it traverses 4.3 miles (6.9 km), starting at the South Carolina state line at Buffalo Creek, through the town of Earl, ending at NC 180, south of Patterson Springs.

== History ==
Established in 1952, the route has not changed since.

== Junction list ==
The entire route is in Cleveland County.

| Location | mi | km | Destinations | Notes |
|---|---|---|---|---|
| | 0.0 | 0.0 | SC 198 south – Blacksburg | Southern terminus; South Carolina state line |
| | 4.3 | 6.9 | NC 180 (South Post Road) – Gaffney | Northern terminus |
1.000 mi = 1.609 km; 1.000 km = 0.621 mi
