= Second Broad River =

Stream in North Carolina, USA

Second Broad River Tributary to Broad River
- Location of Second Broad River mouth Second Broad River (the United States)

Location
- Country: United States
- State: North Carolina
- County: Cleveland; McDowell; Rutherford
- City: Forest City

Physical characteristics
- Source: divide between Second Broad River and Catawba River
  - location: about 1 mile southwest of Providence, North Carolina
  - coordinates: 35°37′29″N 082°03′43″W
  - elevation: 1,510 ft (460 m)
- Mouth: Broad River
  - location: about 1 mile south of Cliffside, North Carolina
  - coordinates: 35°13′19″N 081°45′32″W
  - elevation: 663 ft (202 m)
- Length: 46.14 mi (74.26 km)
- Basin size: 221.29 square miles (573.1 km^{2})
- Discharge
  - location: Broad River
  - average: 338.86 cu ft/s (9.595 m^{3}/s) at mouth with Broad River

Basin features
- Progression: southeast
- River system: Broad River
- Tributaries
  - left: Wilson Branch; Hicks Branch; Camp Branch; Bakers Creek; Box Creek; Big Camp Creek; Cane Creek; Roberson Creek; Puzzle Creek; Webbs Creek; Hills Creek; Riddles Creek
  - right: Rock Creek; Beaverdam Branch; Scrub Grass Creek; Rockhouse Creek; Stoney Creek; Catheys Creek; Buck Branch; Big Spring Branch; Morrow Creek; Hogpen Branch
- Bridges: Sugar Hill Road, Dink Cannon Road, Clinton Lane, Mud Cut Road, Bethel Church Road, Spooky Hollow Road, US 221, Rhom Town Road, Polly Spout Road, Lucky Strike Drive, Polly Spout Road, Box Creek Road, Centennial Road, Boy Scout Road, US 64, Whitesides Road, Cherry Mountain Street, E Main Street, US 74, Low Bridge Road, US 221A, Avondale Landfill Road, Harris Henrietta Road, US 221A

The Second Broad River is a tributary of the Broad River in western North Carolina in the United States. Via the Broad and Congaree rivers, it is part of the watershed of the Santee River, which flows to the Atlantic Ocean.

The Second Broad River rises in south-central McDowell County about 5 miles (8 km) southwest of Marion, and flows generally southeastwardly through Rutherford County, passing to the east of the town of Forest City. It briefly enters Cleveland County before flowing into the Broad River from the north, about 10 miles (16 km) southeast of Forest City.

== See also ==
- First Broad River
- List of North Carolina rivers
