= KEHO =

KEHO may refer to:

- KEHO-LD, a low-power television station (channel 29, virtual 32) licensed to serve Houston, Texas, United States
- Shelby–Cleveland County Regional Airport (ICAO code KEHO)
