= First Broad River =

Stream in North Carolina, USA

First Broad River Tributary to Broad River
- Location of First Broad River mouth

Location
- Country: United States
- State: North Carolina
- Counties: Cleveland; Rutherford

Physical characteristics
- Source: confluence of Little First Broad River and Somey Branch
  - location: about 1 mile NE of Grassy Knob
  - coordinates: 35°31′56″N 081°47′37″W
  - elevation: 1,115 ft (340 m)
- Mouth: Broad River
  - location: about 5 miles SW of Patterson Springs, North Carolina
  - coordinates: 35°31′56″N 081°47′37″W
  - elevation: 625 ft (191 m)
- Length: 62.76 mi (101.00 km)
- Basin size: 324.5 square miles (840 km^{2})
- Discharge
  - location: Broad River
  - average: 324.5 cu ft/s (9.19 m^{3}/s) at mouth with Broad River

Basin features
- Progression: generally south
- River system: Broad River
- Tributaries
  - left: Somey Branch; Grayson Branch; Collins Creek; Beaverdam Branch; Brier Creek; No Business Creek; Wards Creek; Big Branch; Stoney Run Creek; Crooked Run Creek; Knob Creek; Maple Creek; Hickory Creek
  - right: Little First Broad River; South Creek; Big Branch; Mountain Creek; Parker Branch; Long Branch; Hinton Creek; Harris Creek; Brushy Creek; Beaverdam Creek; Yancey Creek

The First Broad River is a tributary of the Broad River, about 60 mi (95 km) long in western North Carolina in the United States. Via the Broad and Congaree Rivers, it is part of the watershed of the Santee River, which flows to the Atlantic Ocean.

The First Broad River rises on South Mountain in northeastern Rutherford County and initially flows southeastwardly into Cleveland County to the town of Lawndale, where it turns southward. After passing to the west of Shelby, the river joins the Broad River from the north in southern Cleveland County.

== See also ==
- List of North Carolina rivers
- Second Broad River
