= Broad River Greenway =

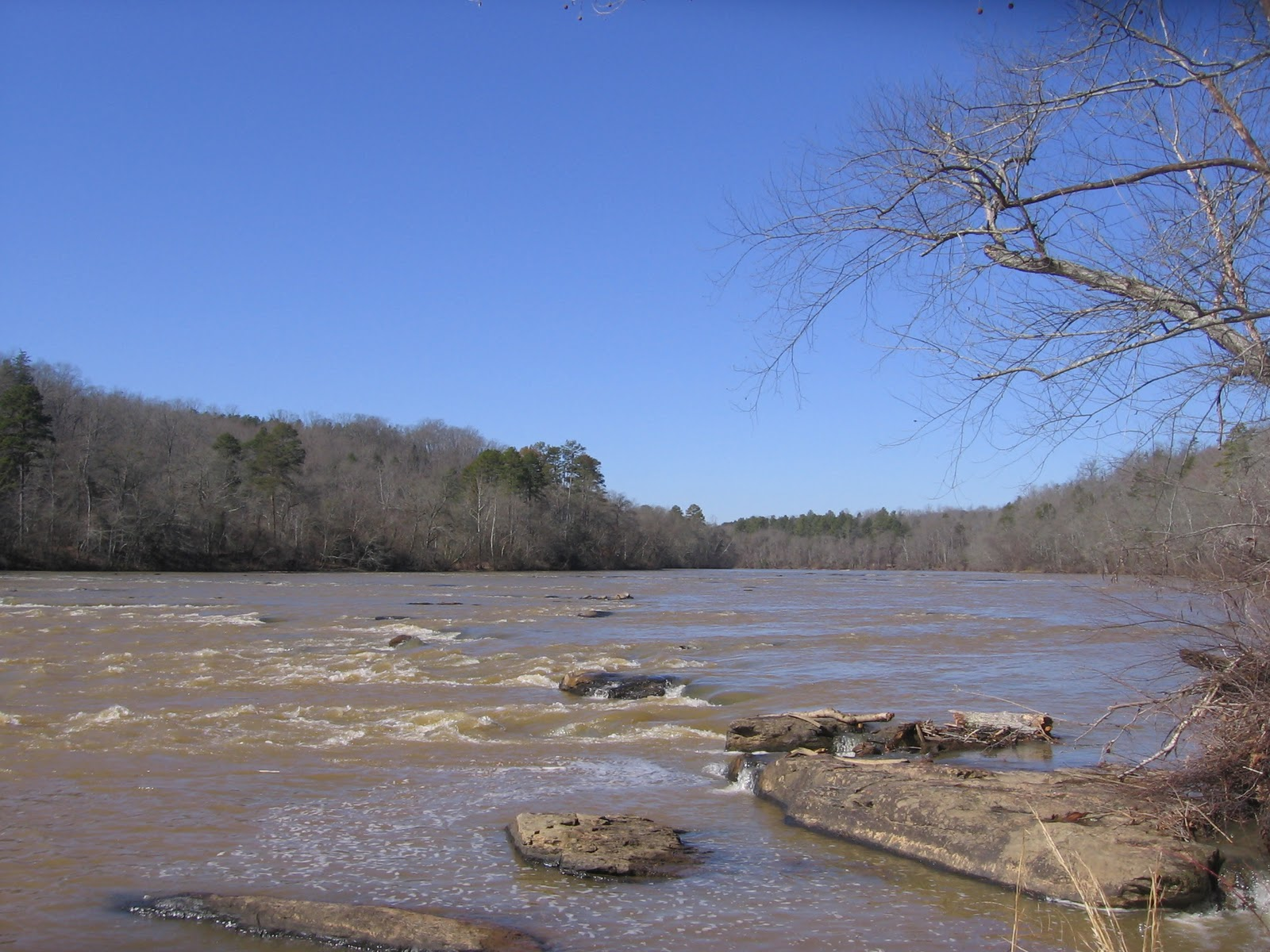

- Location within North Carolina
- Location: Cleveland, North Carolina, United States
- Coordinates: 35°12′06.4″N 81°39′49.8″W
- Area: 1,436 acres (5.81 km^{2})
- Established: 1996
- Governing body: Broad River Greenway, Inc

The Broad River Greenway was established in 1994 as a regional park for Cleveland County, NC.This site has been associated with recreation, long before the land was permanently protected. Duke Energy established the Palmer Shoals Canoe Access Area on the Broad River, as part of a FERC licence issued for the Cliffside Steam Station., just upstream. The "Old College Farm Trail" was a popular hiking venue on the adjoining tract of land owned by Gardner Webb University

== The River ==
Rivers have always been of critical importance to civilization but today, we tend to take them for granted. Not only do they provide us with water, they provide a critical habitat for wildlife. The Broad River provided Native Americans with a valuable source of food and water. The river was also an important transportation corridor from the foothills of the Blue Ridge Mountains to the Atlantic tidewaters. Its meandering course and mild currents made travel relatively easy.
Below the surface of the water, thousands of species of aquatic life depend on this environment Species range from the predatory largemouth bass to microscopic organisms. Today, the river's importance to natural ecosystems and to our needs is understood more fully. Its scenic and recreational importance is cherished. Major tributaries above the Greenway include the Green, and Second Broad rivers, as well as Sandy Run Creek. The First Broad River enters the Broad further downstream, just above the South Carolina state line. Parts of the river in South Carolina have been designated a "state scenic river".

== Land ==
This nature preserve, encompassing 1436 acres along both sides of the river, beckons, nature lovers with a variety of animals and plants. Silence, and a sharp eye, might be rewarded with a glimpse of an osprey, a broad-winged hawk, blue heron, Canada goose, spotted sandpiper, pine warbler, colorful parula warbler, or a red-eyed vireo. The Greenway is also home to several types of duck. The dense, and often wet, underbrush and the banks of the river provide a safe haven for deer, wild turkey, flying squirrels, groundhogs, mink, muskrats, foxes, and maybe the occasional skunk. There have also been reports of bobcats roaming the area.
Some of the Greenway's most beautiful treasures are its wildflowers. Rhododendron, mountain laurel, trillium, wild azalea, jack-in-the-pulpit, dwarf flowered heartleaf, and many more paint the landscape.

== History ==
409 acres-Crescent Resources, Inc, DB 1189–0878, 19 November 1996
13 acres-Duke Power Company, DB 1189–1913, 27 November 1996
1000 acres-NC Department of Transportation, DB 1554–1262, 10 June 2008
12 acres-H.Gene & Billie F. Washburn, DB 1296–1766, 9 May 2001

== Phifer cabin ==
In 1997, Steve Padgett, a local contractor who specializes in restoring log structures, was hired to move a log cabin to the Greenway. This cabin was originally constructed along the banks of Beason Creek, southwest of the city of Kings Mountain, North Carolina. The Phifers were one of the first settlers in the area. It is believed that either Martin Phifer (1794-1854) or John Phifer (1827-1901) constructed the cabin in the mid-1800s. These early settlers used the 'V" notch type construction to secure the logs. Northern European immigrants brought this technique when they settled along the valleys of eastern Tennessee. During an architectural survey in 1997, this was the only log cabin found with this type construction.
