= North Carolina Highway 182 =

State highway in North Carolina, US

North Carolina Highway 182

Route information
- Maintained by NCDOT
- Length: 23.3 mi (37.5 km)
- Existed: 1952–present

Major junctions
- West end: NC 226 in Polkville
- East end: NC 27 near Lincolnton

Location
- Country: United States
- State: North Carolina
- Counties: Cleveland, Lincoln

Highway system
- North Carolina Highway System; Interstate; US; State; Scenic
| ← NC 181 | → NC 183 |

North Carolina Highway 182 (NC 182) is a primary state highway in the U.S. state of North Carolina. It serves to connect the towns of Polkville and Lawndale with the city of Lincolnton.

== Route description ==
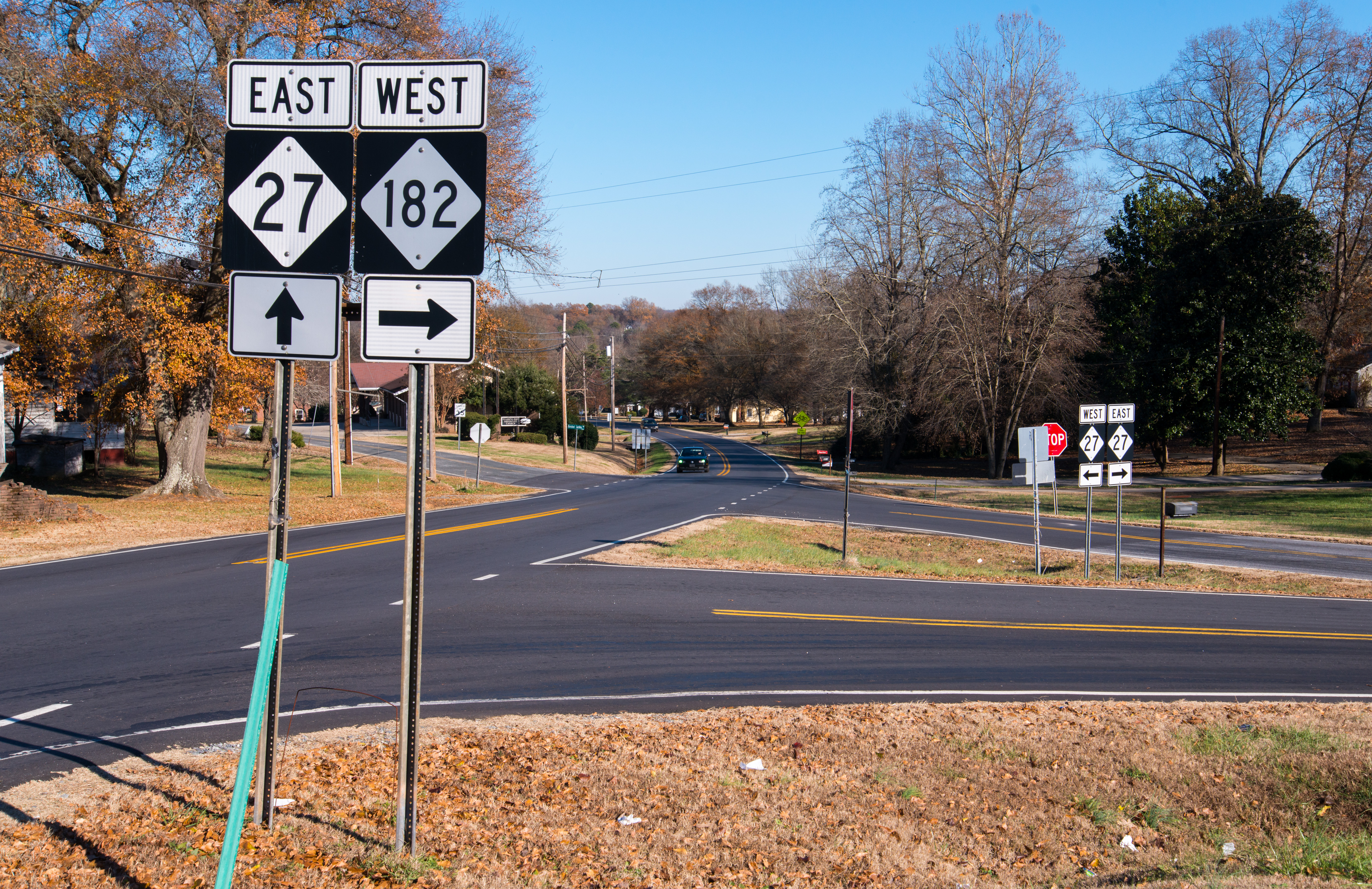
NC 27 and NC 182, near Lincolnton

NC 182 is a two-lane rural highway that begins at NC 226 in Polkville and ends at NC 27 near Lincolnton. The 23.3-mile (37.5 km) route is a mildly curvy road crossing the First Broad River in Lawndale. All of NC 182 is concurrent with North Carolina Bicycle Route 8.

== History ==
NC 182 was established in 1952 as a renumbering of NC 180 between Polkville and Fallston and a new primary routing between Fallston and NC 7 near Lincolnton. The route has remained unchanged since inception.

== Junction list ==
| County | Location | mi | km | Destinations | Notes |
|---|---|---|---|---|---|
| Cleveland | Polkville | 0.0 | 0.0 | NC 226 (Polkville Road) – Shelby, Marion | |
| Cleveland | Fallston | 8.5 | 13.7 | NC 18 (Fallston Road) – Shelby, Morganton | |
| Lincoln | | 13.9 | 22.4 | NC 274 – Cherryville, Morganton | |
| Lincoln | | 23.3 | 37.5 | NC 27 – Lincolnton, Morganton | |
1.000 mi = 1.609 km; 1.000 km = 0.621 mi
