= Fallston =

Fallston is the name of several places in the United States:

- Fallston, Maryland
- Fallston, North Carolina
- Fallston, Pennsylvania
