= EHO =

EHO may refer to:

- Environmental health officer
- Shelby–Cleveland County Regional Airport, in North Carolina, United States
- European History Online
- Extra heavy oil

== See also ==
- Echo (disambiguation)
