= Lattimore, North Carolina =

- Town
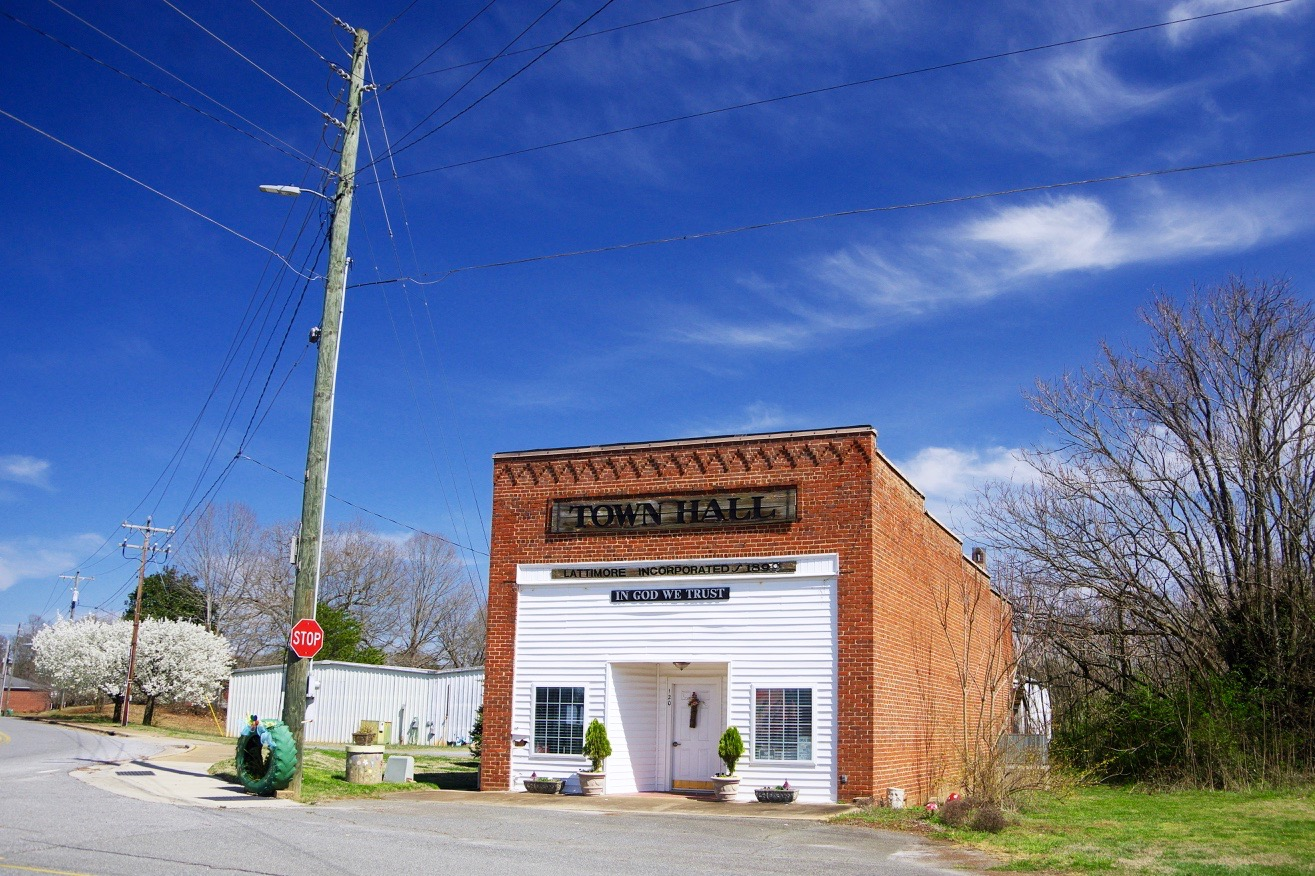
- Town Hall

- Seal

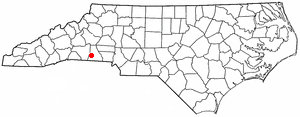
- Location of Lattimore, North Carolina
- Coordinates: 35°18′55″N 81°39′37″W
- Country: United States
- State: North Carolina
- County: Cleveland

Area
  - Total: 1.03 sq mi (2.66 km^{2})
  - Land: 1.03 sq mi (2.66 km^{2})
  - Water: 0 sq mi (0.00 km^{2})
- Elevation: 909 ft (277 m)

Population (2020)
  - Total: 406
  - Density: 396.0/sq mi (152.91/km^{2})
- Time zone: UTC-5 (Eastern (EST))
  - Summer (DST): UTC-4 (EDT)
- ZIP code: 28089
- Area code: 704
- FIPS code: 37-37040
- GNIS feature ID: 2405990
- Website: lattimorenc.gov

Lattimore is a town in Cleveland County, North Carolina, United States. As of the 2020 census, Lattimore had a population of 406.

== History ==
A post office called Lattimore has been in operation since 1886. The town was named for an early settler.

== Geography ==
According to the United States Census Bureau, the town has a total area of 1.0 square mile (2.6 km^{2}), all land.

== Demographics ==
Historical population
Census	Pop.	Note	%±
1900	108		—
1910	297		175.0%
1920	262		−11.8%
1930	270		3.1%
1940	342		26.7%
1950	286		−16.4%
1960	257		−10.1%
1970	257		0.0%
1980	237		−7.8%
1990	183		−22.8%
2000	419		129.0%
2010	488		16.5%
2020	406		−16.8%
U.S. Decennial Census

As of the census of 2000, there were 419 people, 119 households, and 79 families residing in the town. The population density was 419.9 inhabitants per square mile (162.1/km^{2}). There were 127 housing units at an average density of 127.3 per square mile (49.2/km^{2}). The racial makeup of the town was 97.14% White, 2.15% African American, 0.24% Asian, 0.24% from other races, and 0.24% from two or more races. Hispanic or Latino of any race were 0.48% of the population.

There were 119 households, out of which 31.1% had children under the age of 18 living with them, 53.8% were married couples living together, 7.6% had a female householder with no husband present, and 33.6% were non-families. 32.8% of all households were made up of individuals, and 17.6% had someone living alone who was 65 years of age or older. The average household size was 2.38 and the average family size was 3.05.

In the town, the population was spread out, with 17.9% under the age of 18, 36.0% from 18 to 24, 19.3% from 25 to 44, 16.5% from 45 to 64, and 10.3% who were 65 years of age or older. The median age was 23 years. For every 100 females, there were 88.7 males. For every 100 females age 18 and over, there were 93.3 males.

The median income for a household in the town was $29,063, and the median income for a family was $38,500. Males had a median income of $21,875 versus $17,708 for females. The per capita income for the town was $12,302. About 10.8% of families and 11.0% of the population were below the poverty line, including 3.1% of those under age 18 and 18.0% of those age 65 or over.

== Education ==
Lattimore is the home of Ambassador Baptist College, a private Bible college dedicated to training "God's servants for God's service". The college was founded in 1989 by Evangelist Ron Comfort in the nearby city of Shelby, but was moved to Lattimore in 1997.
