= North Carolina Highway 180 =

State highway in Cleveland County, North Carolina, US

North Carolina Highway 180
- Post Road

Route information
- Maintained by NCDOT
- Length: 12.0 mi (19.3 km)
- Existed: 1956–present

Major junctions
- South end: NC 18 near Patterson Springs
- US 74 in Shelby
- North end: NC 18 near Shelby

Location
- Country: United States
- State: North Carolina
- Counties: Cleveland

Highway system
- North Carolina Highway System; Interstate; US; State; Scenic
← NC 179	→ NC 181

North Carolina Highway 180 (NC 180) is a primary state highway in the U.S. state of North Carolina. The highway serves as a bypass east of Shelby, serving as an alternate through route of NC 18.

== Route description ==
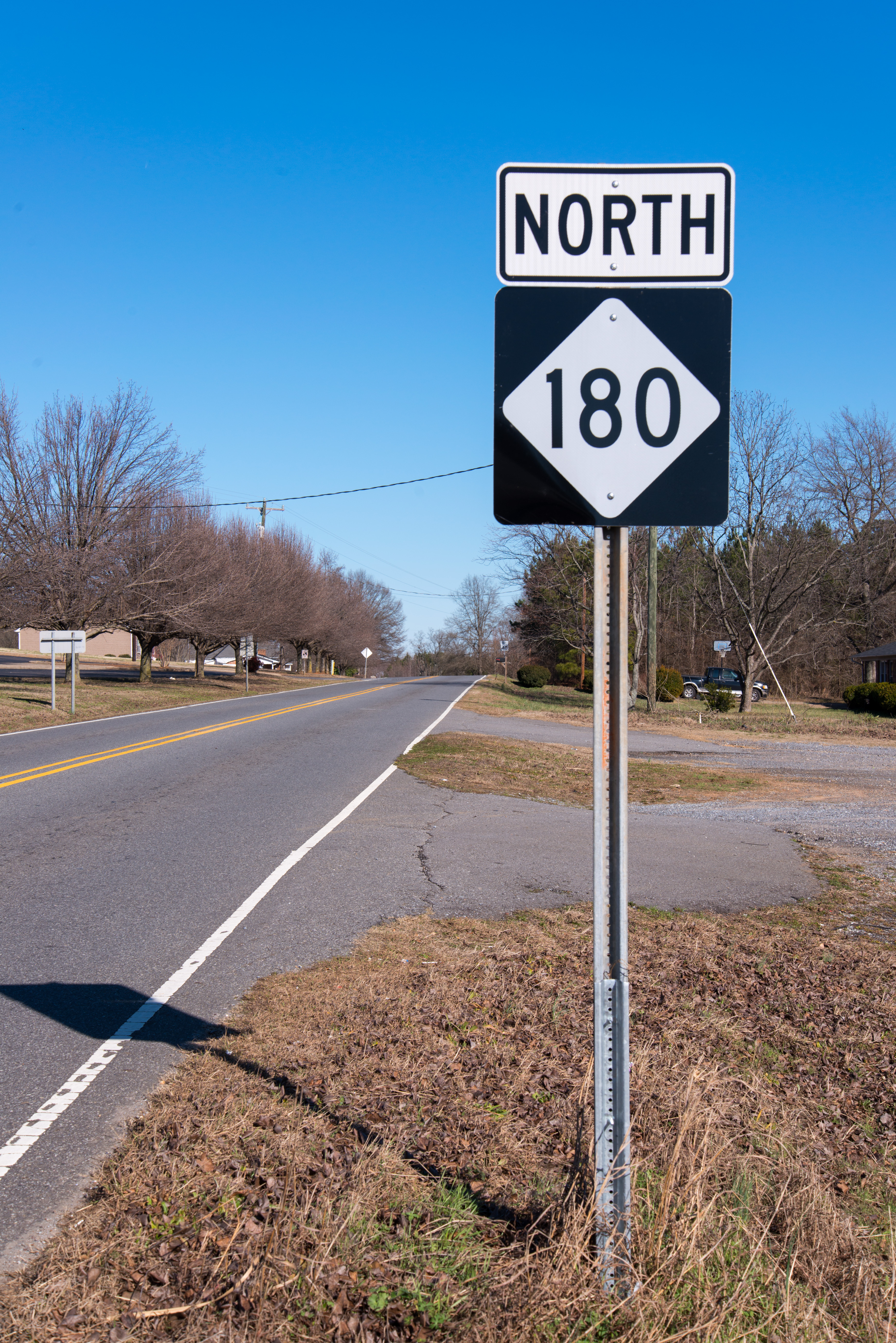
NC 180, heading north towards Patterson Springs

NC 180 is a two-lane rural highway that traverses 12 miles (19 km) from NC 18, near the South Carolina state line, through the town of Patterson Springs, where it meets briefly with NC 226. Continuing north, it passes through Eastern Shelby, crossing US 74, then heads back to NC 18, north of Shelby.

== History ==
Established in 1952, as a mostly new primary route around Shelby, and has not changed since. The first NC 180 was from 1932-1952, connecting the communities of Polkville to Fallston; it was renumbered as an extension of NC 182.

== Junction list ==
The entire route is in Cleveland County.

Location	mi	km	Destinations	Notes
	0.0	0.0	NC 18 (Lafayette Street) / Mt. Sinai Church Road – Gaffney, Shelby	
Patterson Springs	2.6	4.2	NC 198 south (Blacksburg Road) – Earl, Blacksburg	Northern terminus of NC 198
Patterson Springs	3.6	5.8	NC 226 south (Cleveland Avenue) – Grover	South end of NC 226 overlap
	5.1	8.2	NC 226 north (Earl Road)	North end of NC 226 overlap
Shelby	6.6	10.6	US 74 (Dixon Boulevard) – Kings Mountain, Asheville	
Shelby	7.4	11.9	US 74 Bus. (East Marion Street) – Shelby, Kings Mountain	
Shelby	9.7	15.6	NC 150 (Cherryville Road) – Shelby, Cherryville	Roundabout
	12.0	19.3	NC 18 (Fallston Road) – Fallston, Shelby	
1.000 mi = 1.609 km; 1.000 km = 0.621 mi: Concurrency terminus
