= Casar, North Carolina =

- Town
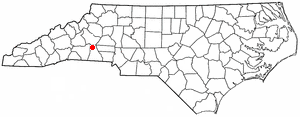
- Location of Casar, North Carolina
- Coordinates: 35°30′45″N 81°37′01″W
- Country: United States
- State: North Carolina
- County: Cleveland

Area
  - Total: 1.75 sq mi (4.53 km^{2})
  - Land: 1.75 sq mi (4.53 km^{2})
  - Water: 0 sq mi (0.00 km^{2})
- Elevation: 1,142 ft (348 m)

Population (2020)
  - Total: 305
  - Density: 174.3/sq mi (67.28/km^{2})
- Time zone: UTC-5 (Eastern (EST))
  - Summer (DST): UTC-4 (EDT)
- ZIP code: 28020
- Area code: 704
- FIPS code: 37-10760
- GNIS feature ID: 2406233

Casar is a small town in northern Cleveland County, North Carolina, United States. As of the 2020 census, Casar had a population of 305.

== Geography and History ==
According to the United States Census Bureau, the town has a total area of 1.8 square miles (4.7 km^{2}), all land. According to locals, Casar was originally incorporated as Race Path in 1890. In 1903, the name was to be changed to Caesar, but Joe Meade with the US Postal Service sent off the application for incorporation, the name came back misspelled and the town officially became Casar.^{Needs Citation}

== Demographics ==
Historical population
Census	Pop.	Note	%±
1970	339		—
1980	346		2.1%
1990	328		−5.2%
2000	308		−6.1%
2010	297		−3.6%
2020	305		2.7%
U.S. Decennial Census

As of the census of 2000, there were 308 people, 132 households, and 93 families residing in the town. The population density was 176.0 inhabitants per square mile (68.0/km^{2}). There were 145 housing units at an average density of 82.9 per square mile (32.0/km^{2}). The racial makeup of the town was 99.35% White and 0.65% African American.

There were 132 households, out of which 25.0% had children under the age of 18 living with them, 55.3% were married couples living together, 7.6% had a female householder with no husband present, and 29.5% were non-families. 27.3% of all households were made up of individuals, and 10.6% had someone living alone who was 65 years of age or older. The average household size was 2.33 and the average family size was 2.81.

In the town, the population was spread out, with 19.2% under the age of 18, 7.5% from 18 to 24, 29.2% from 25 to 44, 25.3% from 45 to 64, and 18.8% who were 65 years of age or older. The median age was 40 years. For every 100 females, there were 94.9 males. For every 100 females age 18 and over, there were 91.5 males.

The median income for a household in the town was $26,875, and the median income for a family was $30,179. Males had a median income of $24,375 versus $16,250 for females. The per capita income for the town was $16,486. About 18.6% of families and 22.1% of the population were below the poverty line, including 31.4% of those under the age of eighteen and 13.2% of those 65 or over.
