= Cleveland County, North Carolina =

County in North Carolina, United States

- County
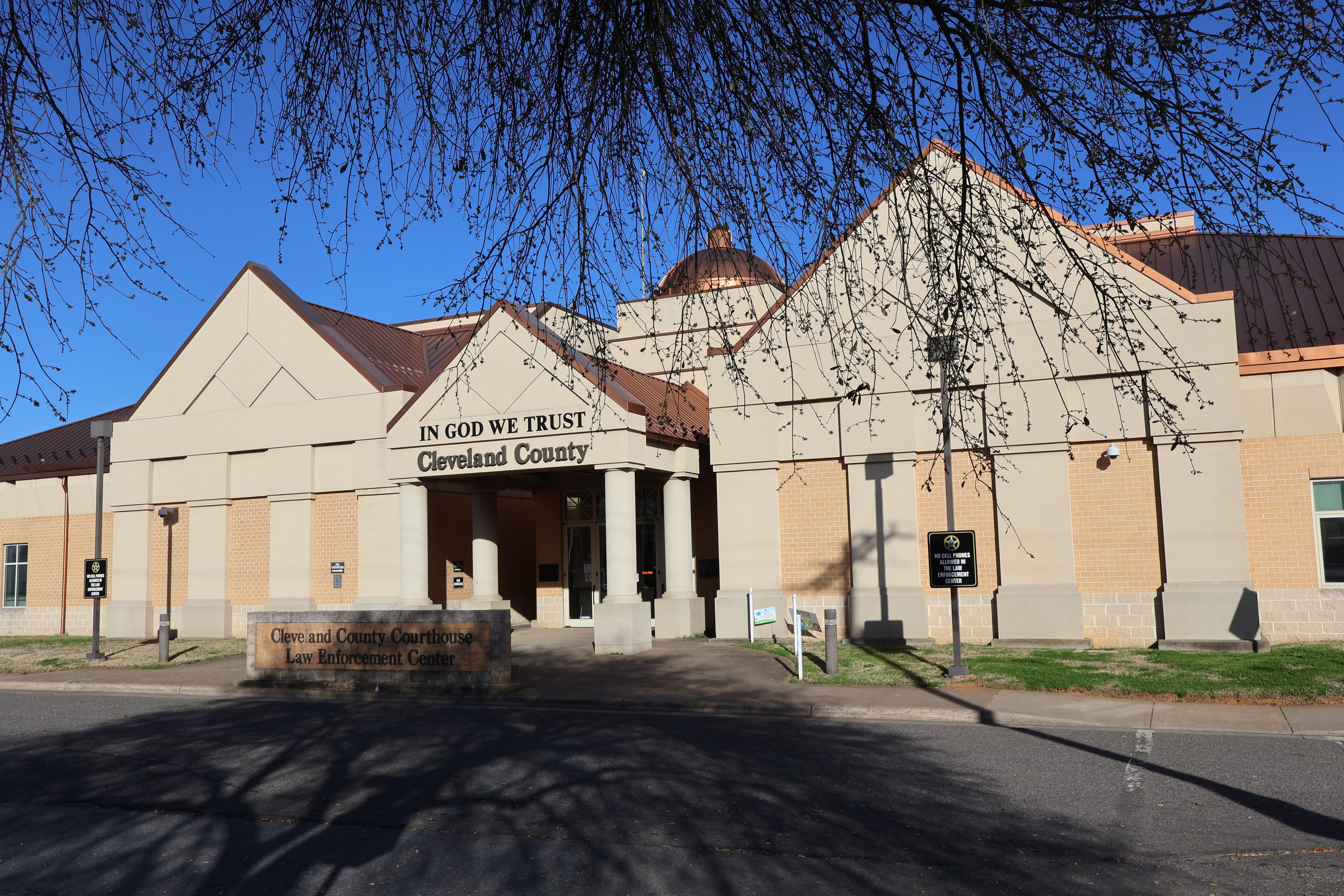
- Cleveland County Courthouse

- Seal Logo
- Motto(s): "Live, Work and Play in Cleveland County"
- Location within the U.S. state of North Carolina
- Interactive map of Cleveland County, North Carolina
- Coordinates: 35.33°N 81.56°W
- Country: United States
- State: North Carolina
- Founded: 1841
- Named for: Benjamin Cleveland
- Seat: Shelby
- Largest community: Shelby

Area
  - Total: 468.18 sq mi (1,212.6 km^{2})
  - Land: 464.25 sq mi (1,202.4 km^{2})
  - Water: 3.93 sq mi (10.2 km^{2}) 0.84%

Population (2020)
  - Total: 99,519
  - Estimate (2025): 103,325 ▲
  - Density: 214.37/sq mi (82.767/km^{2})
- Time zone: UTC−5 (Eastern)
  - Summer (DST): UTC−4 (EDT)
- Congressional district: 14th
- Website: www.clevelandcounty.com

Cleveland County is a county located in the foothills of the Blue Ridge Mountains and the western Piedmont, on the southern border of the U.S. state of North Carolina. As of the 2020 census, the population was 99,519. Its county seat is Shelby. Cleveland County comprises the Shelby-Kings Mountain, NC Micropolitan Statistical Area, which is also included in the Charlotte-Concord, NC-SC Combined Statistical Area.

After the county abolished its eleven townships in 2009, the United States Census Bureau began treating the entire county as a single nonfunctioning, nongovernmental county subdivision named Cleveland. This arrangement is similar to Arlington County, Virginia, where the Census Bureau recognizes a single pseudo minor civil division encompassing the entire county.

== History ==
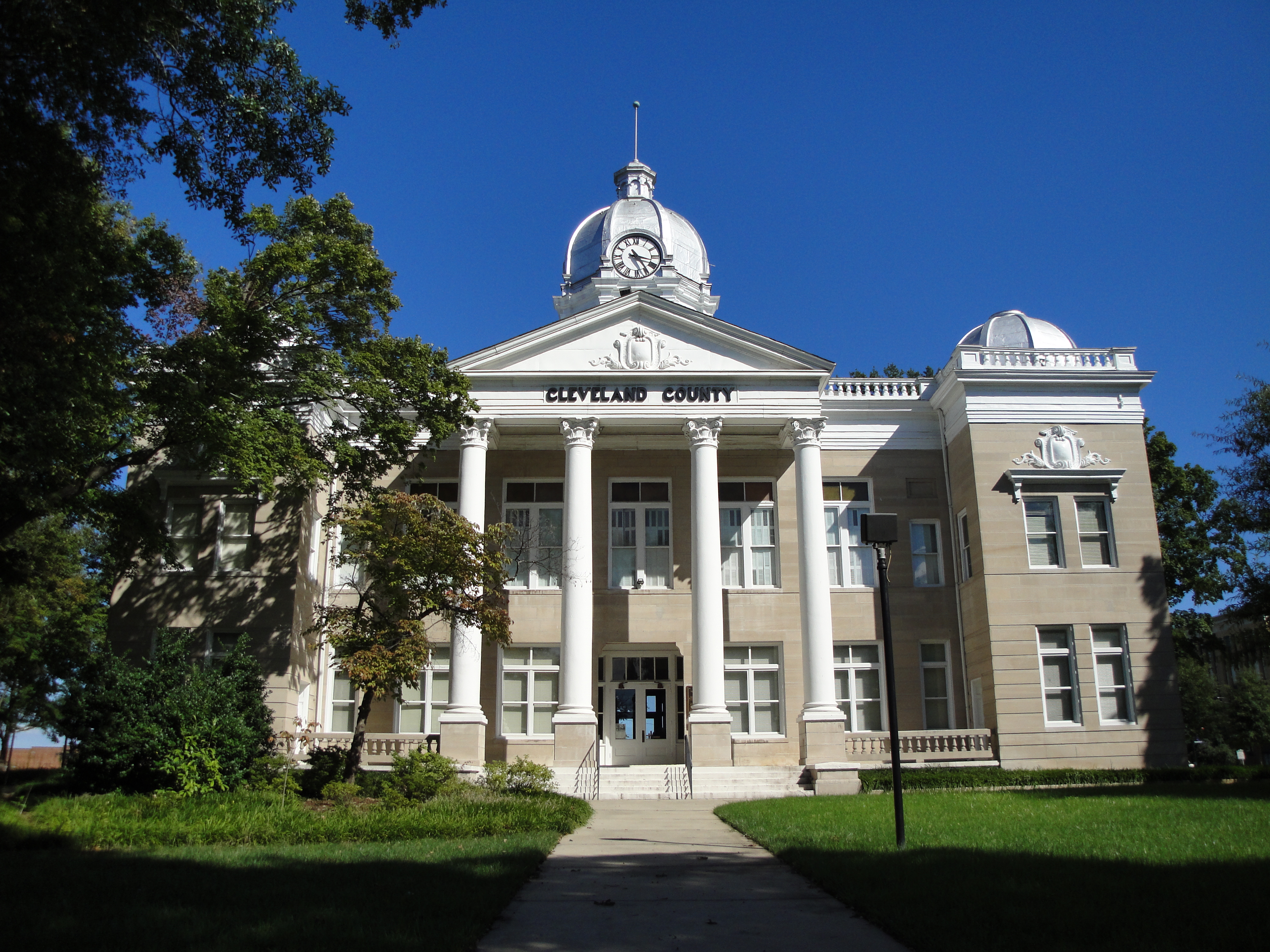
Former Cleveland County Courthouse in Shelby

The county was formed in 1841 from parts of Lincoln and Rutherford counties. It was named for Benjamin Cleveland, a colonel in the American Revolutionary War, who took part in Patriot victory at the Battle of King's Mountain. From 1841 to 1887 "Cleaveland" was the spelling used; the present spelling was adopted in 1887.

== Geography ==
According to the U.S. Census Bureau, the county has a total area of 468.18 square miles (1,212.6 km^{2}), of which 464.25 square miles (1,202.4 km^{2}) is land and 3.93 square miles (10.2 km^{2}) (0.84%) is water.

Cleveland County is part of the South Mountains, a sub-range of the Blueridge Mountains that runs through the county's northwest corner. In the south east corner of the county is Crowders & Kings Mountains, part of a small narrow ridge that sits above the very near surrounding area. They are part of a very old remnant of The Appalachians and used to be much larger. Overall Cleveland County is very hilly, and even mountainous in certain parts, though not to the extreme as counties to the west or north.

=== State and local protected areas ===
- Broad River Greenway
- City of Shelby Hanna Park
- Fallen Heroes Memorial at Raper-Roark Park
- John H. Moss Lake Recreation Park
- Kings Mountain Gateway Trail
- South Mountains Game Lands (part)

=== Major water bodies ===
- Benson Creek
- Broad River
- Buffalo Creek
- Hickory Creek
- Hilton Creek
- Kings Mountain Reservoir
- Little Buffalo Creek
- Little Persimmon Creek
- Persimmon Creek
- Suck Creek
- Moss Lake

=== Adjacent counties ===
- Burke County – north
- Lincoln County – east
- Gaston County – east
- York County, South Carolina – south
- Cherokee County, South Carolina – south
- Rutherford County – west

=== Major highways ===
- I-85
- US 29
- US 74
- US 74 Bus. (Kings Mountain)
- US 74 Bus. (Shelby)
- US 74 Bus. (to Rutherford County)
- US 74 Byp. (Shelby Bypass)
- NC 10
- NC 18
- NC 27
- NC 150
- NC 161
- NC 180
- NC 182
- NC 198
- NC 216
- NC 226

=== Major infrastructure ===
- Shelby–Cleveland County Regional Airport

== Demographics ==
Historical population
Census	Pop.	Note	%±
1850	10,396		—
1860	12,348		18.8%
1870	12,696		2.8%
1880	16,571		30.5%
1890	20,394		23.1%
1900	25,078		23.0%
1910	29,494		17.6%
1920	34,272		16.2%
1930	51,914		51.5%
1940	58,055		11.8%
1950	64,357		10.9%
1960	66,048		2.6%
1970	72,556		9.9%
1980	83,435		15.0%
1990	84,714		1.5%
2000	96,287		13.7%
2010	98,078		1.9%
2020	99,519		1.5%
2025 (est.)	103,325	▲	3.8%
U.S. Decennial Census; 1790–1960 1900–1990; 1990–2000 2010 2020

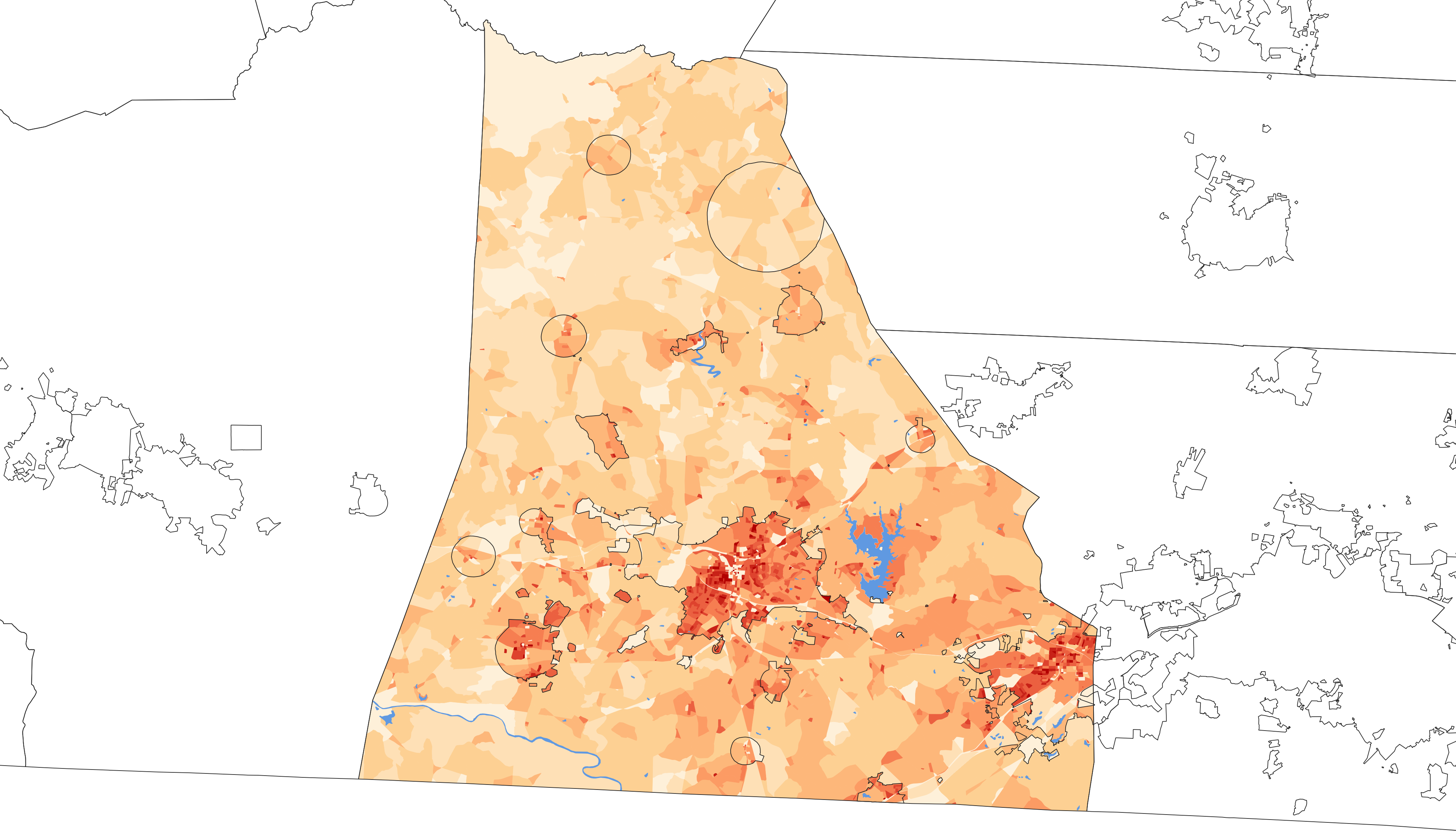
2020 population density of Cleveland County NC by census block

=== Racial and ethnic composition ===
Cleveland County, North Carolina – Racial and ethnic composition Note: the US Census treats Hispanic/Latino as an ethnic category. This table excludes Latinos from the racial categories and assigns them to a separate category. Hispanics/Latinos may be of any race.
Race / Ethnicity (NH = Non-Hispanic)	Pop 1980	Pop 1990	Pop 2000	Pop 2010	Pop 2020	% 1980	% 1990	% 2000	% 2010	% 2020
White alone (NH)	65,544	66,152	73,357	72,793	70,163	78.56%	78.09%	76.19%	74.22%	70.50%
Black or African American alone (NH)	17,205	17,701	20,010	20,237	20,034	20.62%	20.90%	20.78%	20.63%	20.13%
Native American or Alaska Native alone (NH)	62	113	137	193	222	0.07%	0.13%	0.14%	0.20%	0.22%
Asian alone (NH)	101	354	647	735	854	0.12%	0.42%	0.67%	0.75%	0.86%
Native Hawaiian or Pacific Islander alone (NH)	x	x	9	22	23	x	x	0.01%	0.02%	0.02%
Other race alone (NH)	50	18	84	74	327	0.06%	0.02%	0.09%	0.08%	0.33%
Mixed race or Multiracial (NH)	x	x	610	1,268	3,857	x	x	0.63%	1.29%	3.88%
Hispanic or Latino (any race)	473	376	1,433	2,756	4,039	0.57%	0.44%	1.49%	2.81%	4.06%
Total	83,435	84,714	96,287	98,078	99,519	100.00%	100.00%	100.00%	100.00%	100.00%

As of the 2020 census, the county had a population of 99,519 and a median age of 42.4 years. 21.6% of residents were under the age of 18 and 19.3% of residents were 65 years of age or older. For every 100 females there were 92.7 males, and for every 100 females age 18 and over there were 89.5 males age 18 and over.

There were 39,887 households in the county, including 21,410 families. Of those households, 28.9% had children under the age of 18 living in them, 45.9% were married-couple households, 17.7% were households with a male householder and no spouse or partner present, and 30.3% were households with a female householder and no spouse or partner present. About 28.1% of all households were made up of individuals and 12.8% had someone living alone who was 65 years of age or older.

There were 43,630 housing units, of which 8.6% were vacant. Among occupied housing units, 66.3% were owner-occupied and 33.7% were renter-occupied. The homeowner vacancy rate was 1.0% and the rental vacancy rate was 5.9%.

The racial makeup of the county was 71.4% White, 20.3% Black or African American, 0.3% American Indian and Alaska Native, 0.9% Asian, <0.1% Native Hawaiian and Pacific Islander, 2.1% from some other race, and 5.1% from two or more races. Hispanic or Latino residents of any race comprised 4.1% of the population.

37.8% of residents lived in urban areas, while 62.2% lived in rural areas.

=== 2010 census ===
At the 2010 census, there were 98,078 people, 37,046 households, and 27,006 families residing in the county. The population density was 207 people per square mile (80 people/km^{2}). There were 40,317 housing units at an average density of 87 units per square mile (34 units/km^{2}). The racial makeup of the county was 74% White, 21% Black or African American, 0.15% Native American, 0.69% Asian, 0.01% Pacific Islander, 0.68% from other races, and 0.72% from two or more races. Of any race, 3% of the population were Hispanic or Latino.

There were 37,046 households, out of which 32.20% had children under the age of 18 living with them, 55.00% were married couples living together, 13.70% had a female householder with no husband present, and 27.10% were non-families. 23.60% of all households were made up of individuals, and 9.60% had someone living alone who was 65 years of age or older. The average household size was 2.53 and the average family size was 2.98.

In the county, the age distribution of the population shows 25.20% under the age of 18, 8.80% from 18 to 24, 28.80% from 25 to 44, 23.70% from 45 to 64, and 13.50% who were 65 years of age or older. The median age was 36 years. For every 100 females there were 92.60 males. For every 100 females age 18 and over, there were 88.60 males.

The median income for a household in the county was $35,283, and the median income for a family was $41,733. Males had a median income of $30,882 versus $21,995 for females. The per capita income for the county was $17,395. About 10.10% of families and 13.30% of the population were below the poverty line, including 17.90% of those under age 18 and 14.00% of those age 65 or over.

== Government and politics ==
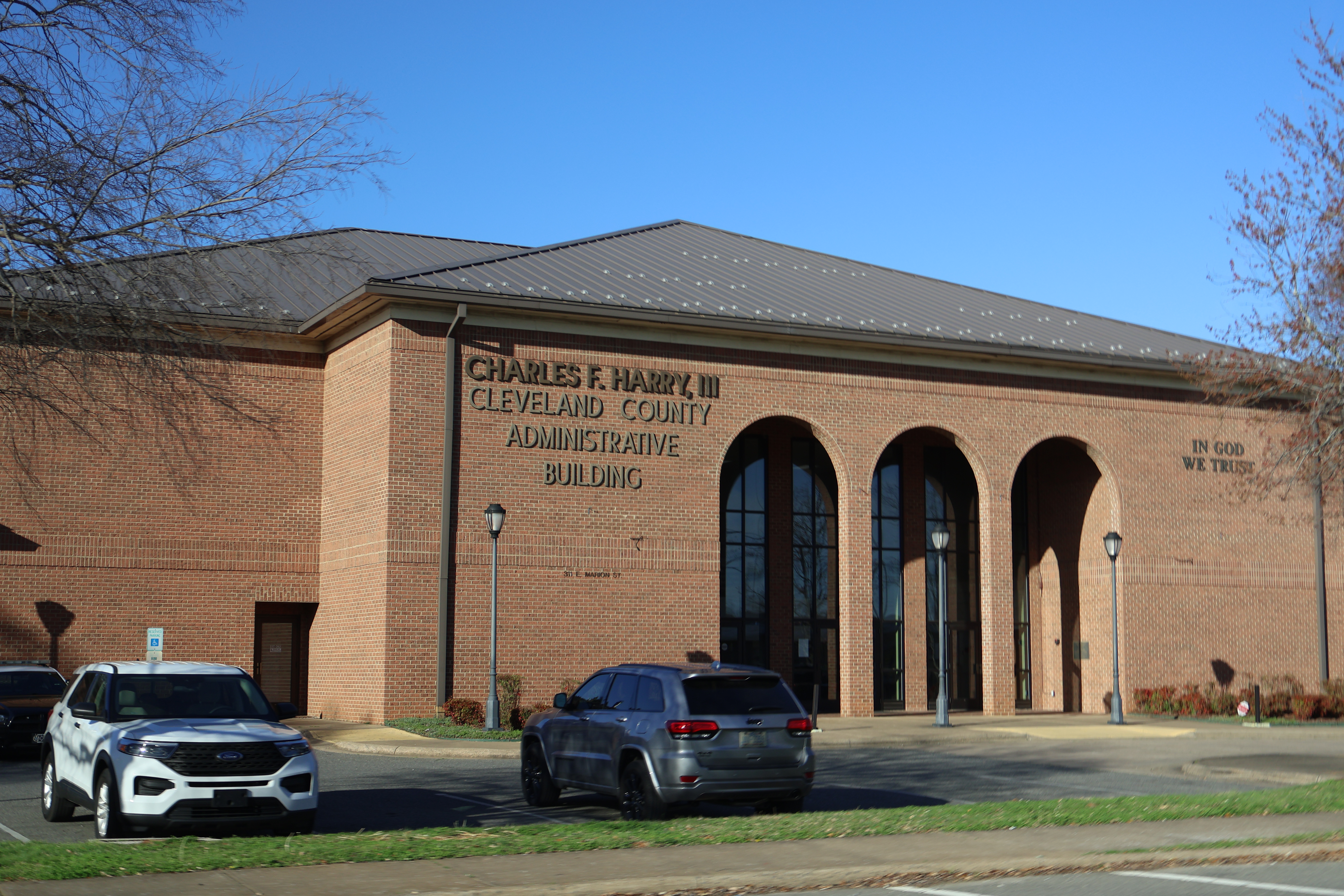
Cleveland County Administrative Building in Shelby

Cleveland is a typical "Solid South" county in its voting patterns. It was Democratic until 1968 when the county voted for American Independent Party candidate George Wallace. In 1972, the county voted overwhelmingly for Richard Nixon, and since then, Cleveland has become a Republican stronghold. The last Democrat to carry Cleveland County was Jimmy Carter in 1980.

United States presidential election results for Cleveland County, North Carolina
Year	Republican		Democratic		Third party(ies)	
Year	No.	%	No.	%	No.	%
1912	81	2.40%	2,351	69.66%	943	27.94%
1916	1,497	35.13%	2,764	64.87%	0	0.00%
1920	2,953	36.30%	5,181	63.70%	0	0.00%
1924	1,743	31.52%	3,749	67.81%	37	0.67%
1928	4,766	49.24%	4,914	50.76%	0	0.00%
1932	1,904	19.15%	8,016	80.60%	25	0.25%
1936	2,116	15.66%	11,393	84.34%	0	0.00%
1940	1,970	17.41%	9,346	82.59%	0	0.00%
1944	2,636	24.39%	8,170	75.61%	0	0.00%
1948	1,905	20.57%	6,039	65.21%	1,317	14.22%
1952	7,606	43.93%	9,709	56.07%	0	0.00%
1956	7,076	45.70%	8,408	54.30%	0	0.00%
1960	8,257	43.92%	10,545	56.08%	0	0.00%
1964	7,874	42.08%	10,836	57.92%	0	0.00%
1968	7,298	32.28%	5,661	25.04%	9,649	42.68%
1972	13,726	72.06%	4,994	26.22%	328	1.72%
1976	8,106	35.89%	14,406	63.78%	76	0.34%
1980	10,828	46.08%	12,219	52.00%	451	1.92%
1984	17,095	62.23%	10,288	37.45%	89	0.32%
1988	14,039	57.54%	10,321	42.30%	37	0.15%
1992	13,650	44.72%	13,037	42.71%	3,835	12.56%
1996	13,474	47.71%	12,728	45.07%	2,039	7.22%
2000	19,064	58.22%	13,455	41.09%	227	0.69%
2004	22,750	61.36%	14,215	38.34%	114	0.31%
2008	26,078	59.49%	17,363	39.61%	394	0.90%
2012	25,793	59.51%	17,062	39.37%	485	1.12%
2016	28,479	63.75%	14,964	33.50%	1,230	2.75%
2020	33,798	65.87%	16,955	33.05%	555	1.08%
2024	34,654	67.02%	16,603	32.11%	449	0.87%

Cleveland County is a member of the Isothermal Planning and Development Commission regional council of governments.

== Education ==
=== Cleveland County Schools ===
Cleveland County Schools, which covers the entire county, has 29 schools ranging from pre-kindergarten to twelfth grade, comprising five high schools, two alternative schools, four middle schools, two intermediate schools (grades 5 and 6), and sixteen elementary schools. It was formed from the 2004 merger of Kings Mountain City Schools, Shelby City Schools and the former Cleveland County Schools.

=== Post-secondary ===
- Ambassador Bible College in Lattimore, North Carolina
- Cleveland Community College
- Gardner–Webb University

== Communities ==
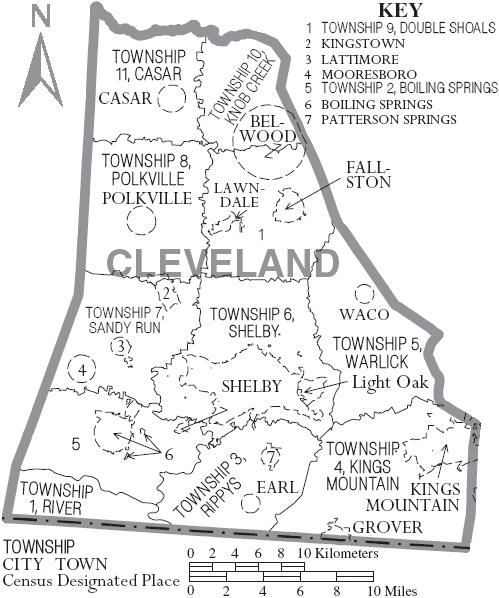
Map of Cleveland County with municipal and township labels

=== Cities ===
- Kings Mountain (small section in Gaston County)
- Shelby (county seat and largest community)

=== Towns ===
- Belwood
- Boiling Springs
- Casar
- Earl
- Fallston
- Grover
- Kingstown
- Lattimore
- Lawndale
- Mooresboro
- Patterson Springs
- Polkville
- Waco

=== Census-designated place ===
- Light Oak

=== Unincorporated communities ===
- Delight
- Double Shoals
- Hillsdale
- Toluca
- Woodbridge
- Zion

=== Townships ===
By the requirement of the North Carolina Constitution of 1868, Cleveland County was divided into eleven townships. Although the townships originally had governmental functions, their administrative importance declined as those functions were consolidated at the county level.

In 2009, the Cleveland County Planning Department recommended abolishing the township boundaries. At a May 5 meeting of the Board of County Commissioners, Planning Director Bill McCarter explained that the county had experienced discrepancies between township boundaries used by the United States Census Bureau and precinct boundaries used by the county and the North Carolina State Board of Elections for approximately twenty years. According to McCarter, the historic township boundaries were arbitrary, lacked legal descriptions, and were not known to be used by any agency for regulatory purposes. The Planning Department recommended resolving the issue before the 2010 census. The commissioners initially tabled the proposal to allow additional research.

On May 19, 2009, the commissioners reconsidered the proposal. McCarter again explained that eliminating the township boundaries would reduce discrepancies between Census Bureau and election records. The board then unanimously adopted Resolution No. 15-2009, which formally abolished all eleven townships and their boundaries. The resolution cited the lack of written descriptions for the township boundaries, the county's responsibility to report boundary information to the Census Bureau through the annual Boundary and Annexation Survey, and confusion caused by inaccurate township boundaries. North Carolina law authorizes county boards of commissioners to establish, alter, name, and abolish townships.

For the 2010 census, the Census Bureau recorded a new county subdivision named Cleveland as having been formed from the merger of all eleven former townships. The Census Bureau consequently treats the entire county as a single nonfunctioning, nongovernmental county subdivision named Cleveland, rather than as eleven separate townships.

The eleven former townships were:

1. River Township
2. Boiling Springs Township
3. Rippy's Township
4. Kings Mountain Township
5. Warlick Township
6. Shelby Township
7. Sandy Run Township
8. Polkville Township
9. Double Shoals Township
10. Knob Creek Township
11. Casar Township

== Notable people ==
- Tamara P. Barringer, former state legislator and Associate Justice of the North Carolina Supreme Court
- Bobby Bell, NFL Hall of Fame inductee
- Alicia Bridges, disco singer
- Jonathan Bullard, NFL DE, Minnesota Vikings. Former Crest High School and the University of Florida football great.
- W. J. Cash, author of The Mind of the South
- Bill Champion, MLB player.
- Morris Davis, Colonel in US Air Force
- Thomas Dixon Jr., minister, author
- Manny Fernandez, "The Raging Bull", professional wrestler
- David Flair, professional wrestler
- Alvin Gentry, NBA Coach
- Don Gibson, Country Music Hall of Fame inductee
- Pleasant Daniel Gold, American publisher and Baptist minister
- Kay Hagan, Senator from North Carolina.
- Robert Harrill, The Fort Fisher Hermit
- Keith E. Haynes, Maryland statesman, lawyer
- Norris Hopper, MLB player
- Hatcher Hughes, Pulitzer Prize winner
- Charlie Justice, NFL player, two-time Heisman Trophy runner-up
- Doug Limerick, ABC radio newscaster
- Patty Loveless, country music singer
- Leroy McAfee – Confederate soldier, Ku Klux Klan organizer, and member of the North Carolina House of Representatives (1870–73).
- Roger Hornsby McKee, pitcher for the Philadelphia Phillies
- Manteo Mitchell, Olympic Silver Medalist, World Champion, US Champion, International Icon in Track & Field
- Scottie Montgomery, NFL wide receiver, Oakland Raiders, Arena Football League player
- Tim Moore (North Carolina politician), member of the General Assembly since 2003 and elected Speaker of the North Carolina State House in 2015, has lived in the county since 1997 and has his law practice there.
- Lorcan Morris, Professional Golf Caddie lives in Boiling Springs.
- Travis Padgett, Olympic athlete in track and field
- Floyd Patterson, heavyweight boxing champion, Boxing Hall Of Fame inductee
- Joanna Pearson, writer
- Rodney Allen Rippy, former child actor
- Earl Scruggs, banjo player and composer, included on Hollywood Walk of Fame
- Isaac Shelby, soldier, governor
- Charlotte Smith, WNBA basketball player
- Brandon Spikes, professional football linebacker
- Billy Standridge, NASCAR driver
- Tim Steele, 3-time ARCA champion, NASCAR driver
- David Thompson, Hall of Fame college and professional basketball player
- Cliff Washburn, NFL offensive tackle, Houston Texans
- Tim Wilkison, tennis player
- Tom Wright, MLB player.

== In popular culture ==
The 2000 disappearance of Asha Degree, a Shelby girl, was discussed on television shows including America's Most Wanted, The Oprah Winfrey Show, Good Morning America, and The Montel Williams Show.

Parts of the 2012 movie The Hunger Games were filmed in Cleveland County.

== See also ==
- List of counties in North Carolina
- National Register of Historic Places listings in Cleveland County, North Carolina
