= Light Oak, North Carolina =

- Census-designated place
- Location within the state of North Carolina
- Coordinates: 35°17′12″N 81°28′39″W
- Country: United States
- State: North Carolina
- County: Cleveland

Area
  - Total: 1.44 sq mi (3.72 km^{2})
  - Land: 1.44 sq mi (3.72 km^{2})
  - Water: 0 sq mi (0.00 km^{2})
- Elevation: 837 ft (255 m)

Population (2020)
  - Total: 697
  - Density: 484.9/sq mi (187.22/km^{2})
- Time zone: UTC-5 (Eastern (EST))
  - Summer (DST): UTC-4 (EDT)
- FIPS code: 37-38170
- GNIS feature ID: 2403232

Light Oak is an unincorporated area and census-designated place (CDP) in Cleveland County, North Carolina, United States. As of the 2020 census, Light Oak had a population of 697.

== Geography ==
Light Oak is located in southeastern Cleveland County and is bordered on the west and south by the city of Shelby, the Cleveland County seat.

According to the United States Census Bureau, the CDP has a total area of 1.4 square miles (3.7 km^{2}), all land.

== Demographics ==
Historical population
Census	Pop.	Note	%±
2000	779		—
2010	691		−11.3%
2020	697		0.9%
U.S. Decennial Census

=== Racial and ethnic composition ===
Light Oak CDP, North Carolina – Racial and ethnic composition Note: the US Census treats Hispanic/Latino as an ethnic category. This table excludes Latinos from the racial categories and assigns them to a separate category. Hispanics/Latinos may be of any race.
Race / Ethnicity (NH = Non-Hispanic)	Pop 2000	Pop 2010	Pop 2020	% 2000	% 2010	% 2020
White alone (NH)	132	170	163	16.94%	24.60%	23.39%
Black or African American alone (NH)	640	506	492	82.16%	73.23%	70.59%
Native American or Alaska Native alone (NH)	1	2	0	0.13%	0.29%	0.00%
Asian alone (NH)	4	0	1	0.51%	0.00%	0.14%
Native Hawaiian or Pacific Islander alone (NH)	0	0	0	0.00%	0.00%	0.00%
Other race alone (NH)	0	0	1	0.00%	0.00%	0.14%
Mixed race or Multiracial (NH)	2	0	29	0.26%	0.00%	4.16%
Hispanic or Latino (any race)	0	13	11	0.00%	1.88%	1.58%
Total	779	691	697	100.00%	100.00%	100.00%

=== 2020 census ===
As of the 2020 United States census, there were 697 people, 388 households, and 218 families residing in the CDP.

=== 2000 census ===
As of the census of 2000, there were 779 people, 240 households, and 191 families residing in the CDP. The population density was 518.2 inhabitants per square mile (200.1/km^{2}). There were 255 housing units at an average density of 169.6 per square mile (65.5/km^{2}). The racial makeup of the CDP was 16.94% White, 82.16% African American, 0.13% Native American, 0.51% Asian, and 0.26% from two or more races.

There were 240 households, out of which 23.3% had children under the age of 18 living with them, 45.0% were married couples living together, 27.9% had a female householder with no husband present, and 20.4% were non-families. 17.5% of all households were made up of individuals, and 7.1% had someone living alone who was 65 years of age or older. The average household size was 2.85 and the average family size was 3.24.

In the CDP, the population was spread out, with 23.6% under the age of 18, 9.9% from 18 to 24, 27.3% from 25 to 44, 27.6% from 45 to 64, and 11.6% who were 65 years of age or older. The median age was 36 years. For every 100 females, there were 111.7 males. For every 100 females age 18 and over, there were 109.5 males.

The median income for a household in the CDP was $28,472, and the median income for a family was $32,794. Males had a median income of $20,550 versus $16,989 for females. The per capita income for the CDP was $13,016. About 20.7% of families and 17.1% of the population were below the poverty line, including 15.3% of those under age 18 and 51.9% of those age 65 or over.
