= Earl, North Carolina =

- Town
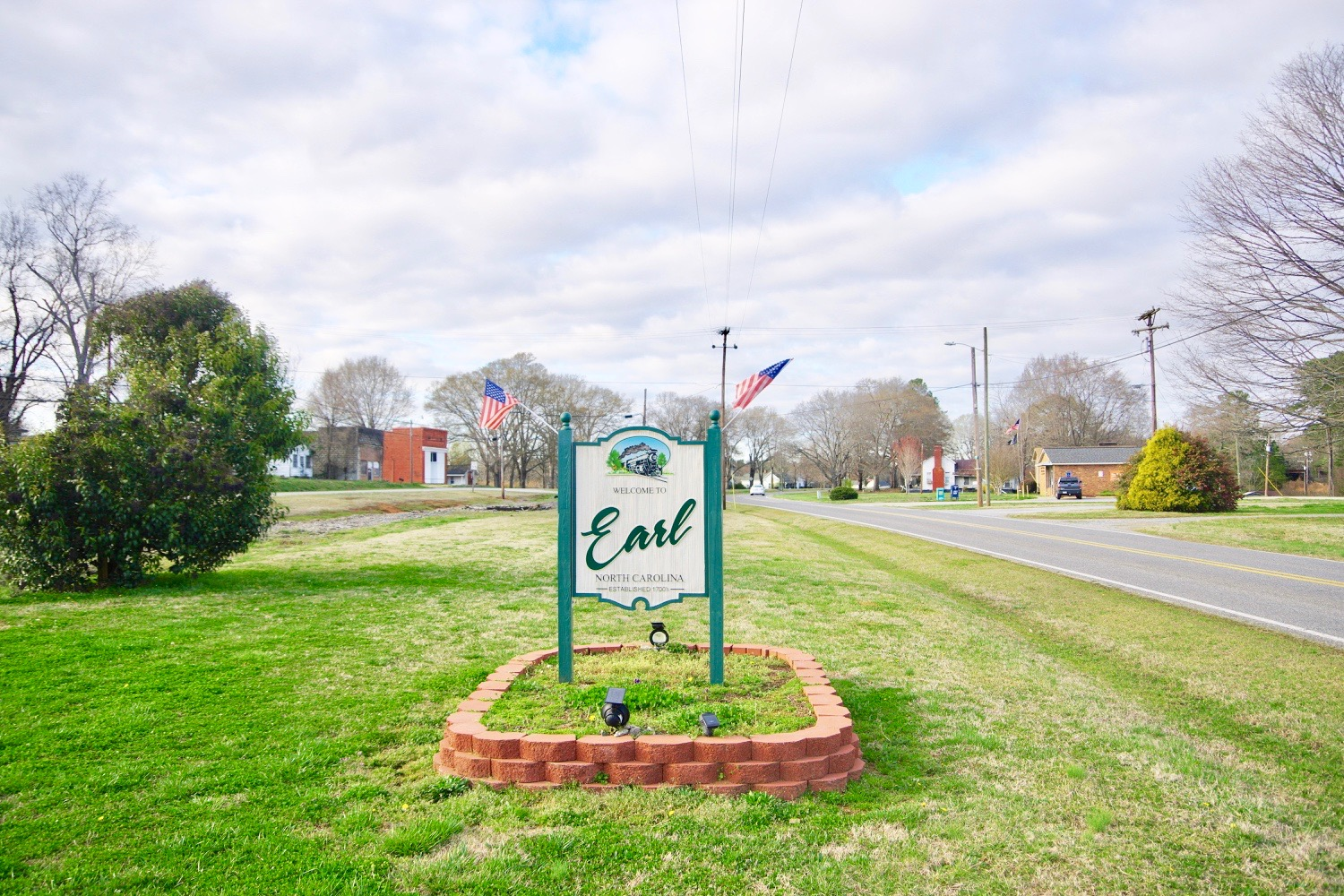
- Welcome sign along Blacksburg Road (NC 198)

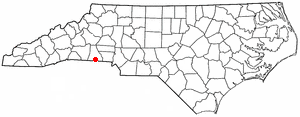
- Location of Earl, North Carolina
- Coordinates: 35°11′44″N 81°32′03″W
- Country: United States
- State: North Carolina
- County: Cleveland

Area
  - Total: 0.86 sq mi (2.23 km^{2})
  - Land: 0.86 sq mi (2.23 km^{2})
  - Water: 0 sq mi (0.00 km^{2})
- Elevation: 840 ft (260 m)

Population (2020)
  - Total: 198
  - Density: 229.9/sq mi (88.76/km^{2})
- Time zone: UTC-5 (Eastern (EST))
  - Summer (DST): UTC-4 (EDT)
- ZIP code: 28038
- Area code: 704
- FIPS code: 37-19140
- GNIS feature ID: 2406410
- Website: http://www.townofearl.org/

Earl is a town in Cleveland County, North Carolina, United States. As of the 2020 census, Earl had a population of 198.

== History ==
Earl incorporated in 1889, and was named for local landowner Abel Earl.

== Geography ==
According to the United States Census Bureau, the town has a total area of 0.8 square miles (2.1 km^{2}), all land.

== Demographics ==
Historical population
Census	Pop.	Note	%±
1980	206		—
1990	230		11.7%
2000	234		1.7%
2010	260		11.1%
2020	198		−23.8%
U.S. Decennial Census

As of the census of 2000, there were 234 people, 100 households, and 64 families residing in the town. The population density was 285.5 inhabitants per square mile (110.2/km^{2}). There were 109 housing units at an average density of 133.0 per square mile (51.4/km^{2}). The racial makeup of the town was 86.32% White, 11.97% African American, 0.85% from other races, and 0.85% from two or more races. Hispanic or Latino of any race were 2.56% of the population.

There were 100 households, out of which 25.0% had children under the age of 18 living with them, 41.0% were married couples living together, 17.0% had a female householder with no husband present, and 36.0% were non-families. 33.0% of all households were made up of individuals, and 9.0% had someone living alone who was 65 years of age or older. The average household size was 2.34 and the average family size was 2.97.

In the town, the population was spread out, with 24.8% under the age of 18, 9.0% from 18 to 24, 29.9% from 25 to 44, 27.4% from 45 to 64, and 9.0% who were 65 years of age or older. The median age was 35 years. For every 100 females, there were 84.3 males. For every 100 females age 18 and over, there were 89.2 males.

The median income for a household in the town was $30,625, and the median income for a family was $35,714. Males had a median income of $27,292 versus $19,318 for females. The per capita income for the town was $17,016. About 7.6% of families and 10.8% of the population were below the poverty line, including 27.5% of those under the age of eighteen and 13.6% of those 65 or over.
