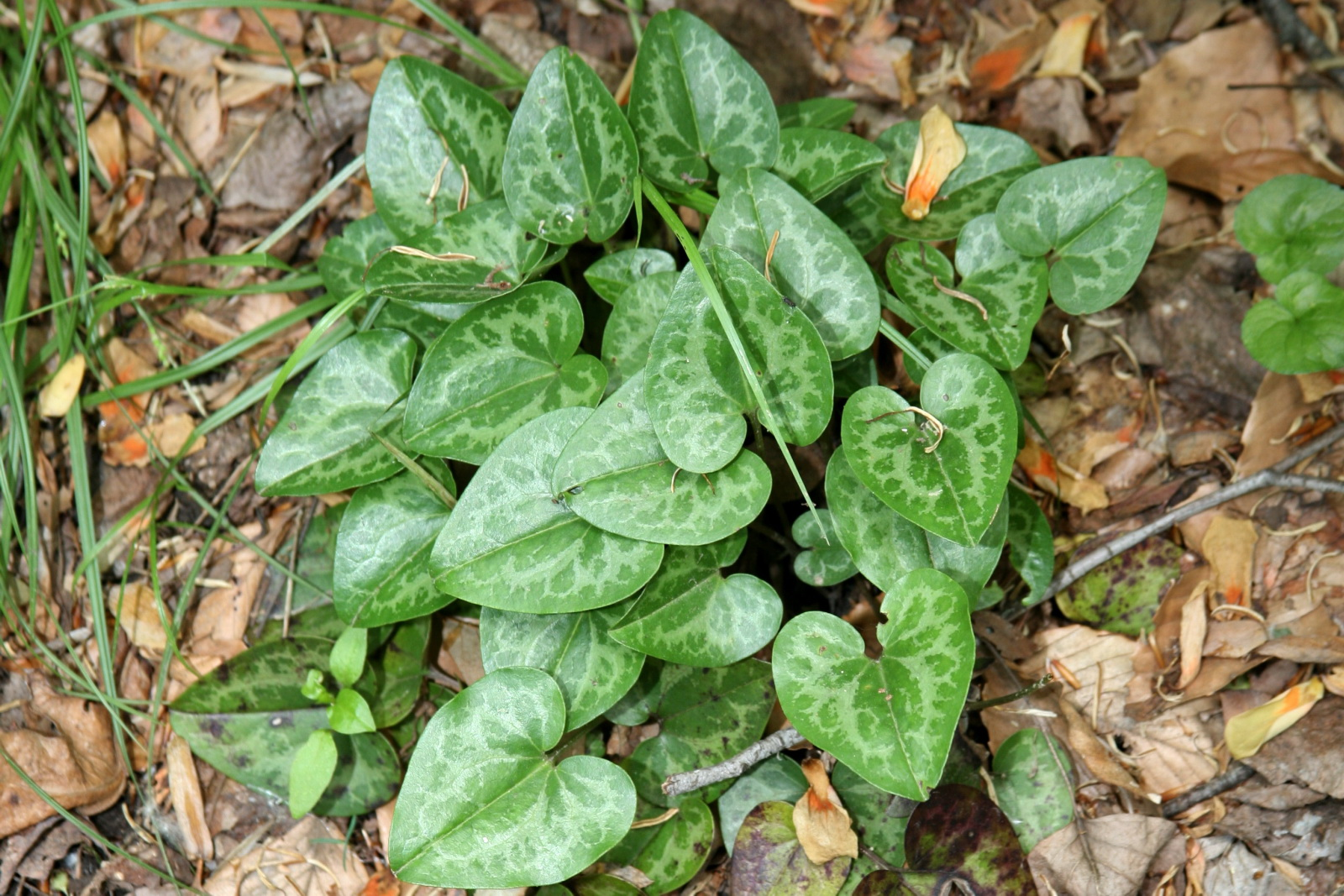

Conservation status
- Vulnerable (NatureServe)

Scientific classification
- Kingdom: Plantae
- Clade: Tracheophytes
- Clade: Angiosperms
- Clade: Magnoliids
- Order: Piperales
- Family: Aristolochiaceae
- Genus: Hexastylis
- Species: H. naniflora

Binomial name
- Hexastylis naniflora H.L.Blomq.

= Hexastylis naniflora =

Species of flowering plant

Hexastylis naniflora is a flowering plant in the birthwort family known by the common name dwarf-flowered heartleaf. It is endemic to the Piedmont region of the United States, where it is limited to a small area straddling the border between North Carolina and South Carolina. It was a federally listed threatened species. On July 8, 2025 it was delisted because of recovery.

This is a rhizomatous perennial herb forming a small patch on the ground, the leaves emerging from the underground rhizome. The evergreen leaves have leathery heart-shaped blades. The plant produces one new leaf per year. The fleshy brown flowers are jug-shaped and may remain buried in the leaf litter.

This plant occurs in oak-hickory-pine plant communities. It typically grows on slopes near streams in moist, acidic soils. It is associated with Kalmia latifolia (mountain-laurel) and can often be found growing beneath it. It is associated with several species of oak, particularly Quercus coccinea (scarlet oak), Quercus montana (chestnut oak), and Quercus velutina (black oak).

The plant is known from eleven counties in southern North Carolina and northern South Carolina. In 2004 there were about 150 populations known, but many of these are very small. The main threat to the species is the loss and degradation of its habitat. Much of the plant's historical habitat has been converted to agriculture, particularly peach orchards, and developed into residential areas. Remaining populations can be found on land which is threatened by cattle grazing, agriculture, expanding residential and commercial areas, timber harvesting, and construction of ponds and lakes.
