= Lawndale, North Carolina =

- Town
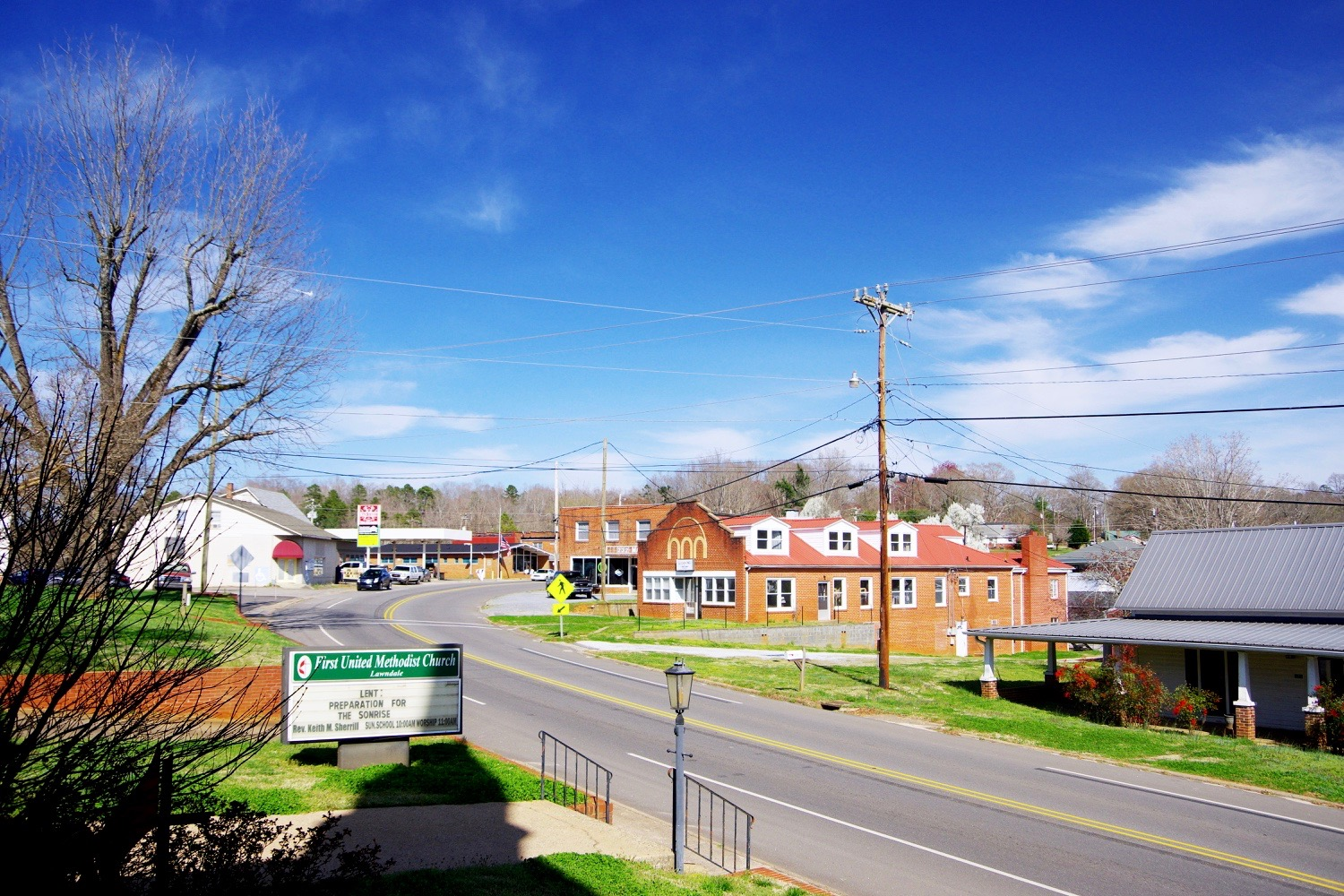
- Main Street (NC 182)

- Seal

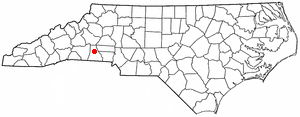
- Location of Lawndale, North Carolina
- Coordinates: 35°24′52″N 81°33′46″W
- Country: United States
- State: North Carolina
- County: Cleveland

Area
  - Total: 0.86 sq mi (2.23 km^{2})
  - Land: 0.81 sq mi (2.09 km^{2})
  - Water: 0.054 sq mi (0.14 km^{2})
- Elevation: 846 ft (258 m)

Population (2020)
  - Total: 570
  - Density: 706.7/sq mi (272.86/km^{2})
- Time zone: UTC-5 (Eastern (EST))
  - Summer (DST): UTC-4 (EDT)
- ZIP code: 28090
- Area code: 704
- FIPS code: 37-37260
- GNIS feature ID: 2405993
- Website: townoflawndalenc.com

Lawndale is a town in Cleveland County, North Carolina, United States, situated along the First Broad River. As of the 2020 census, Lawndale had a population of 570.

== History ==
Lawndale developed in the late 19th century around the Cleveland Mills plant established by Major H.F. Schenck. The town was named for the green lawns of the houses where many of the mill's workers lived. Schenck's daughter and son-in-law opened the Piedmont Academy in 1897, and rail service to Shelby began two years later. Lawndale was incorporated in 1903.

== Geography ==
According to the United States Census Bureau, the town has a total area of 0.9 square miles (2.3 km^{2}), of which 0.8 square miles (2.1 km^{2}) is land and 0.1 square miles (0.26 km^{2}) (5.81%) is water.

== Demographics ==
Historical population
Census	Pop.	Note	%±
1910	568		—
1920	774		36.3%
1930	728		−5.9%
1940	1,006		38.2%
1950	964		−4.2%
1960	723		−25.0%
1970	544		−24.8%
1980	469		−13.8%
1990	573		22.2%
2000	642		12.0%
2010	606		−5.6%
2020	570		−5.9%
U.S. Decennial Census

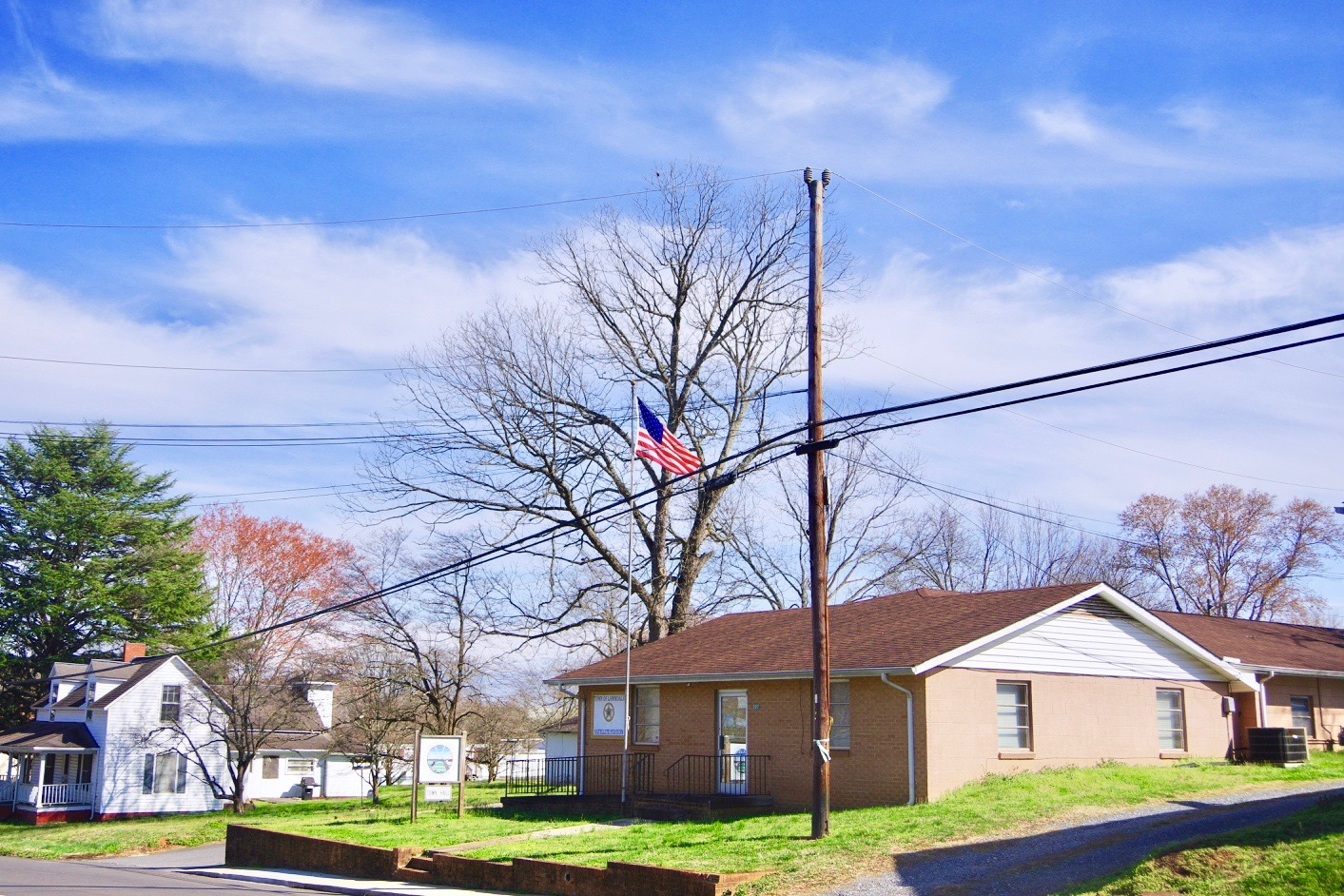
Town hall

At the 2000 census there were 642 people, 270 households, and 180 families in the town. The population density was 791.6 inhabitants per square mile (305.6/km^{2}). There were 300 housing units at an average density of 369.9 per square mile (142.8/km^{2}). The racial makeup of the town was 74.45% White, 22.27% African American, 0.62% Asian, 2.34% from other races, and 0.31% from two or more races. Hispanic or Latino of any race were 2.80%.

Of the 270 households 24.4% had children under the age of 18 living with them, 50.4% were married couples living together, 11.5% had a female householder with no husband present, and 33.0% were non-families. 30.4% of households were one person and 18.1% were one person aged 65 or older. The average household size was 2.38 and the average family size was 2.92.

The age distribution was 21.8% under the age of 18, 8.1% from 18 to 24, 26.3% from 25 to 44, 18.4% from 45 to 64, and 25.4% 65 or older. The median age was 41 years. For every 100 females, there were 85.0 males. For every 100 females age 18 and over, there were 81.2 males.

The median household income was $30,250 and the median family income was $36,023. Males had a median income of $26,484 versus $19,792 for females. The per capita income for the town was $13,002. About 14.5% of families and 19.6% of the population were below the poverty line, including 27.5% of those under age 18 and 21.2% of those age 65 or over.

== Notable person ==
- Alicia Bridges - disco singer-songwriter
