= Shelby–Cleveland County Regional Airport =

- IATA: none; ICAO: KEHO; FAA LID: EHO

Summary
- Airport type: Public
- Owner: City of Shelby
- Serves: Shelby, North Carolina
- Elevation AMSL: 847 ft / 258 m
- Coordinates: 35°15′21″N 081°36′03″W
- Interactive map of Shelby–Cleveland County Regional Airport

Runways
Direction	Length		Surface
Direction	ft	m	Surface
5/23	5,001	1,524	Asphalt

Statistics (2023)
- Aircraft operations (year ending 7/2/2023): 18,200
- Based aircraft: 71
- Source: Federal Aviation Administration

Shelby–Cleveland County Regional Airport (ICAO: KEHO, FAA LID: EHO) is a public use airport located three nautical miles (6 km) southwest of the central business district of Shelby, in Cleveland County, North Carolina, United States. It is owned by the City of Shelby and was formerly known as Shelby Municipal Airport. It is home to the Shelby Composite Squadron of the Civil Air Patrol, the USAF Civilian Auxiliary.

Although many U.S. airports use the same three-letter location identifier for the FAA and IATA, this facility is assigned EHO by the FAA but has no designation from the IATA. The airport's ICAO location indicator is KEHO.

== Facilities and aircraft ==
Shelby–Cleveland County Regional Airport covers an area of 225 acres (91 ha) at an elevation of 847 feet (258 m) above mean sea level. It has one runway designated 5/23 with an asphalt surface measuring 5,001 by 100 feet (1,524 x 30 m).

For the 12-month period ending July 2, 2023, the airport had 18,200 aircraft operations, an average of 50 per day: 99% general aviation and 1% military. At that time there were 71 aircraft based at this airport: 65 single-engine, 4 multi-engine, 1 jet, and 1 helicopter.

== See also ==
- List of airports in North Carolina
