= Patterson Springs, North Carolina =

- Town
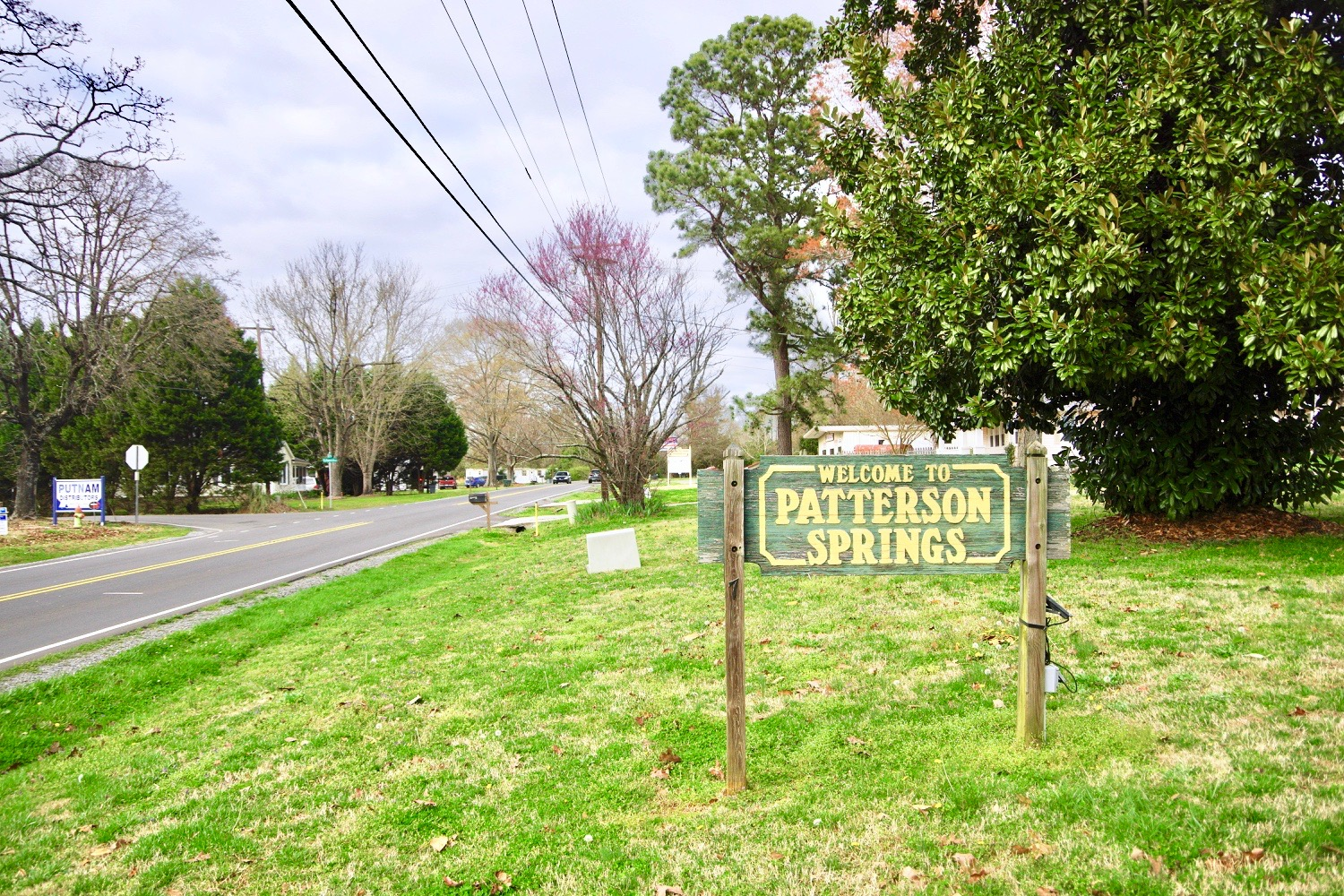
- Welcome sign along S. Post Rd. (NC 180)

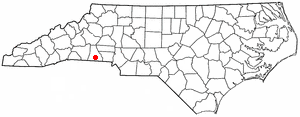
- Location of Patterson Springs, North Carolina
- Coordinates: 35°13′58″N 81°30′58″W
- Country: United States
- State: North Carolina
- County: Cleveland

Area
  - Total: 1.03 sq mi (2.66 km^{2})
  - Land: 1.03 sq mi (2.66 km^{2})
  - Water: 0 sq mi (0.00 km^{2})
- Elevation: 906 ft (276 m)

Population (2020)
  - Total: 571
  - Density: 556.4/sq mi (214.81/km^{2})
- Time zone: UTC-5 (Eastern (EST))
  - Summer (DST): UTC-4 (EDT)
- ZIP code: 28150
- Area code: 704
- FIPS code: 37-50700
- GNIS feature ID: 2407081

Patterson Springs is a town in Cleveland County, North Carolina, United States. As of the 2020 census, Patterson Springs had a population of 571.

== History ==
Patterson Springs was originally a small farming community called "Swangs", with only a train depot and a post office. William George Patterson bought the land that held three springs from the "Epps" family. Patterson hoped that the supposed healing powers of these springs would help heal his son, Billy, who had poor health. Eventually, news of the supposed healing powers of these springs spread, and Patterson created a thirty to forty room resort to house travelers and merchants. The resort, which was one of several in the area, mainly attracted people from North Carolina, South Carolina, and Georgia. When the attendees of the resort were not at the springs, Patterson offered lawn bowling and a dance every Saturday night. In 1885, the name "Swangs confused the railroad people so they convinced the post office to change it to Patterson Springs and the government officials agreed. In 1915, a school building was created, housing all eleven(not 12) grades. Another was built in 1923, which housed grades one through eight, while the High School students attended No. 3 High School. In the 1960s, the post office closed, then in the 1970s, both schools closed. The train depot no longer exists. Most students now attend Township No. 3 Elementary School, Crest High School, or Pinnacle Classical Academy.

== Geography ==
According to the United States Census Bureau, the town has a total area of 0.9 square miles (2.3 km^{2}), all land.

The community is located at the southern end of conjoined state highways NC 180 and NC 226.

== Demographics ==
Historical population
| Census | Pop. | Note | %± |
|---|---|---|---|
| 1980 | 731 | | — |
| 1990 | 690 | | −5.6% |
| 2000 | 620 | | −10.1% |
| 2010 | 622 | | 0.3% |
| 2020 | 571 | | −8.2% |
U.S. Decennial Census

As of the census of 2000, there were 620 people, 254 households, and 169 families residing in the town. The population density was 682.1 inhabitants per square mile (263.4/km^{2}). There were 272 housing units at an average density of 299.3 per square mile (115.6/km^{2}). The racial makeup of the town was 95.48% White, 3.23% African American, 0.16% Native American, and 1.13% from two or more races. Hispanic or Latino of any race were 0.81% of the population.

There were 254 households, out of which 32.3% had children under the age of 18 living with them, 52.8% were married couples living together, 8.3% had a female householder with no husband present, and 33.1% were non-families. 24.8% of all households were made up of individuals, and 7.5% had someone living alone who was 65 years of age or older. The average household size was 2.44 and the average family size was 2.95.

In the town, the population was spread out, with 24.4% under the age of 18, 9.0% from 18 to 24, 33.5% from 25 to 44, 24.4% from 45 to 64, and 8.7% who were 65 years of age or older. The median age was 35 years. For every 100 females, there were 104.6 males. For every 100 females age 18 and over, there were 113.2 males.

The median income for a household in the town was $32,368, and the median income for a family was $34,500. Males had a median income of $31,591 versus $25,577 for females. The per capita income for the town was $15,092. About 10.4% of families and 16.5% of the population were below the poverty line, including 22.2% of those under age 18 and 2.6% of those age 65 or over.

== Economy ==
Ticona, a German-based maker of polymers, operates a large facility in Patterson Springs, and is the town's major employer. Although the company labels the facility as being in Shelby, and the facility's postal mailing address is Shelby, the plant is actually located near Patterson Springs.

== In popular culture ==
In the satirical TV show The Colbert Report, Stephen Colbert has repeatedly mentioned that he spent his early TV career days at the fictitious TV station WPTS, situated in Patterson Springs. This is usually accompanied by a video excerpt from his work there.
