= Fallston, North Carolina =

- Town
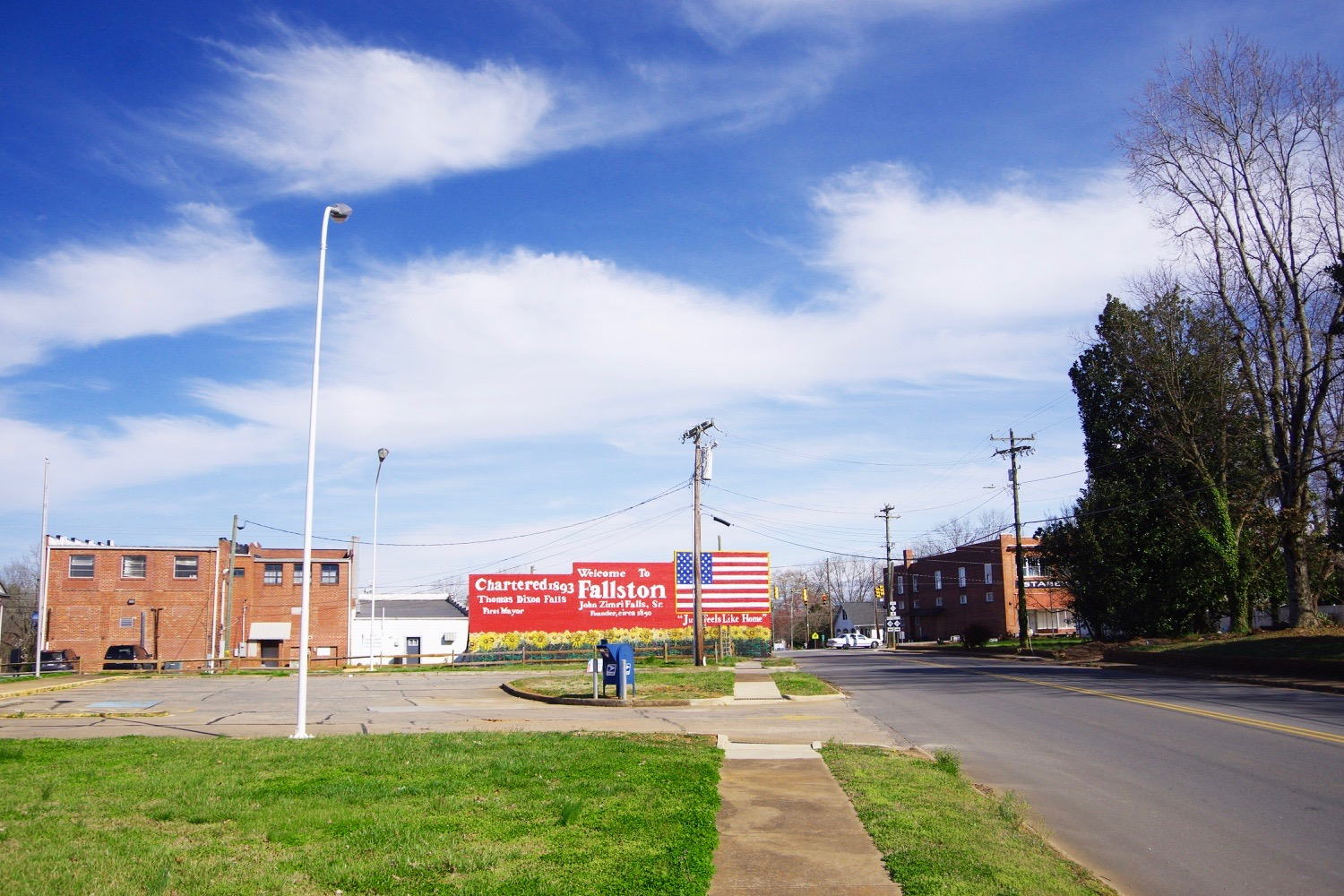
- NC 182 approaching Fallston

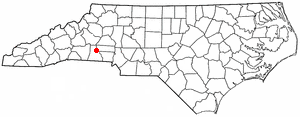
- Location of Fallston, North Carolina
- Coordinates: 35°25′44″N 81°30′08″W
- Country: United States
- State: North Carolina
- County: Cleveland

Area
  - Total: 2.17 sq mi (5.62 km^{2})
  - Land: 2.17 sq mi (5.61 km^{2})
  - Water: 0.0039 sq mi (0.01 km^{2})
- Elevation: 1,027 ft (313 m)

Population (2020)
  - Total: 627
  - Density: 289.6/sq mi (111.83/km^{2})
- Time zone: UTC-5 (Eastern (EST))
  - Summer (DST): UTC-4 (EDT)
- ZIP code: 28042
- Area code: 704
- FIPS code: 37-22720
- GNIS feature ID: 2406489

Fallston is a town in Cleveland County, North Carolina, United States. As of the 2020 census, Fallston had a population of 627.

== History ==
Fallston was settled in the 1880s and incorporated in 1893, and named for John Z. Falls, Sheriff of Cleveland County.

== Geography ==
According to the United States Census Bureau, the town has a total area of 2.2 square miles (5.7 km^{2}), all land.

== Demographics ==
Historical population
Census	Pop.	Note	%±
1970	301		—
1980	614		104.0%
1990	498		−18.9%
2000	603		21.1%
2010	607		0.7%
2020	627		3.3%
U.S. Decennial Census

As of the census of 2000, there were 603 people, 230 households, and 180 families residing in the town. The population density was 277.2 inhabitants per square mile (107.0/km^{2}). There were 254 housing units at an average density of 116.8 per square mile (45.1/km^{2}). The racial makeup of the town was 96.19% White, 2.99% African American, 0.17% Asian, 0.66% from other races. Hispanic or Latino of any race were 1.00% of the population.

There were 230 households, out of which 32.6% had children under the age of 18 living with them, 60.9% were married couples living together, 12.2% had a female householder with no husband present, and 21.7% were non-families. 20.9% of all households were made up of individuals, and 11.7% had someone living alone who was 65 years of age or older. The average household size was 2.52 and the average family size was 2.83.

In the town, the population was spread out, with 23.5% under the age of 18, 6.6% from 18 to 24, 26.7% from 25 to 44, 23.1% from 45 to 64, and 20.1% who were 65 years of age or older. The median age was 38 years. For every 100 females, there were 89.0 males. For every 100 females age 18 and over, there were 85.1 males.

The median income for a household in the town was $35,000, and the median income for a family was $41,042. Males had a median income of $33,125 versus $25,139 for females. The per capita income for the town was $17,415. About 13.1% of families and 13.8% of the population were below the poverty line, including 13.8% of those under age 18 and 19.3% of those age 65 or over.
