= National Register of Historic Places listings in Cleveland County, North Carolina =

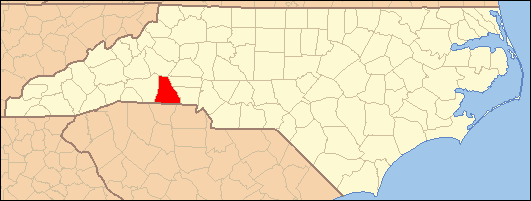

This list includes properties and districts listed on the National Register of Historic Places in Cleveland County, North Carolina. Click the "Map of all coordinates" link to the right to view an online map of all properties and districts with latitude and longitude coordinates in the table below.

== Current listings ==
This National Park Service list is complete through NPS recent listings posted August 21, 2026.

	Name on the Register	Image	Date listed	Location	City or town	Description
1	Banker's House	Banker's House	May 6, 1975 (#75001251)	319 N. Lafayette St. 35°17′44″N 81°32′22″W	Shelby	
2	Joshua Beam House	Joshua Beam House	June 4, 1980 (#80002813)	Northeast of Shelby; 35°20′47″N 81°29′10″W	Shelby	
3	Central School Historic District	Central School Historic District	May 18, 2001 (#01000513)	Roughly N. Battleground Ave., N. Piedmont Ave., E. King St., E. Ridge Ave., and N. Gaston St. 35°14′34″N 81°20′34″W	Kings Mountain	
4	Central Shelby Historic District	Central Shelby Historic District	June 23, 1983 (#83001841)	Roughly Washington St. from Gidney to Sumter, Graham and Warren Sts. to Morgan, and Marion St. from Washington St. to Thompson; also roughly bounded by E. Elm, S. Lafayette, Blanton, N. Thompson, W. Sumter, N. Lafayette, Kendal, and S. Dekalb Sts. 35°17′17″N 81°32′33″W	Shelby	Second set of boundaries represents a boundary increase of September 14, 2002
5	Cleveland County Courthouse	Cleveland County Courthouse	May 10, 1979 (#79001693)	Marion, Washington, Warren, and Lafayette Sts. 35°17′29″N 81°32′22″W	Shelby	Also called Old Cleveland County Courthouse.
6	Cleveland County Training School	Cleveland County Training School	May 2, 2016 (#16000220)	341 Hudson St. 35°17′56″N 81°32′00″W	Shelby	
7	Davidson Elementary School	Davidson Elementary School	May 18, 2016 (#16000287)	500 W. Piedmont Ave. 35°14′41″N 81°21′07″W	Kings Mountain	
8	Double Shoals Cotton Mill	Double Shoals Cotton Mill	March 24, 2009 (#08000775)	199 Old Mill Rd. 35°22′51″N 81°32′43″W	Double Shoals	
9	East Marion-Belvedere Park Historic District	East Marion-Belvedere Park Historic District	December 31, 2002 (#02001667)	Roughly bounded by Cline, Chestnut, E. Marion Sts., Edgemont Ave, Belvedere Aves., and Elizabeth Rd. 35°17′36″N 81°31′36″W	Shelby	
10	E. B. Hamrick Hall	E. B. Hamrick Hall	July 12, 1982 (#82003444)	Gardner-Webb College campus 35°14′58″N 81°40′05″W	Boiling Springs	
11	James Heyward Hull House	James Heyward Hull House	May 1, 2003 (#03000338)	710 N. Lafayette St. 35°18′01″N 81°32′22″W	Shelby	
12	Irvin-Hamrick Log House	Irvin-Hamrick Log House	May 28, 1980 (#80002811)	Northwest of Boiling Springs on SR 1153; 35°16′35″N 81°37′33″W	Boiling Springs	
13	King Street Overhead Bridge	King Street Overhead Bridge	April 6, 2005 (#05000268)	King St. between Battleground and Railroad Aves. 35°14′27″N 81°20′41″W	Kings Mountain	
14	John Lattimore House	John Lattimore House	August 26, 1982 (#82003445)	Northwest of Polkville on SR 1372; 35°26′35″N 81°39′57″W	Polkville	
15	Margrace Mill Village Historic District	Margrace Mill Village Historic District	May 6, 2009 (#09000288)	101-117, 102-120 Cloninger St., 101-113, 102-116, 200 Fulton Dr., 145 Ark St., 101-107, 102-114 Water Oak St. 35°13′29″N 81°21′44″W	Kings Mountain	
16	Masonic Temple Building	Masonic Temple Building	July 15, 1982 (#82003446)	203 S. Washington St. 35°16′54″N 81°32′18″W	Shelby	
17	Jacob S. Mauney Memorial Library and Teacher's Home	Jacob S. Mauney Memorial Library and Teacher's Home	December 16, 2014 (#14001049)	100 S. Piedmont Ave. 35°14′27″N 81°20′34″W	Kings Mountain	
18	Dr. Victor McBrayer House	Dr. Victor McBrayer House	May 31, 1979 (#79001694)	507 N. Morgan St. 35°17′39″N 81°32′30″W	Shelby	
19	Seven Gables		August 1, 2024 (#100010673)	1340 East Marion Street; 35°17′35″N 81°30′18″W	Shelby	
20	Shelby Cotton Mill	Shelby Cotton Mill	December 15, 2015 (#15000898)	500 S. Morgan St. 35°17′09″N 81°32′33″W	Shelby	
21	Shiloh Presbyterian Church Cemetery	Shiloh Presbyterian Church Cemetery	December 22, 2011 (#11000954)	Elm St., 0.9 miles (1.4 km) south of U.S. Route 29; 35°10′09″N 81°25′57″W	Grover	
22	Southern Railway Company Overhead Bridge	Southern Railway Company Overhead Bridge	April 19, 2007 (#07000351)	Spanning the double tracks on the Norfolk Southern Railroad between Battleground and Railroad Aves., 1/2 block north of King St. 35°14′29″N 81°20′41″W	Kings Mountain	
23	George Sperling House and Outbuildings	George Sperling House and Outbuildings	December 31, 2001 (#01001425)	1219 Fallston Rd. 35°18′53″N 81°31′22″W	Shelby	
24	Stamey Company Store	Stamey Company Store	January 10, 2019 (#100003294)	4726 Fallston Rd. 35°25′41″N 81°30′05″W	Shelby	
25	Frank Rickert Summers House		April 26, 2021 (#100006458)	1220 North Piedmont Ave; 35°15′48″N 81°20′14″W	Kings Mountain vicinity	
26	Joseph Suttle House	Joseph Suttle House	July 17, 1980 (#80002814)	Southwest of Shelby; 35°15′55″N 81°35′09″W	Shelby	
27	United States Post Office	United States Post Office	April 29, 2015 (#15000202)	100 E. Mountain St. 35°14′21″N 81°20′32″W	Kings Mountain	Now the Kings Mountain Historical Museum
28	Webbley	Webbley	September 29, 1980 (#80002812)	403 S. Washington St. 35°17′14″N 81°32′20″W	Shelby	
29	West End Historic District	West End Historic District	September 3, 2010 (#10000630)	Bounded by W. Mountain St., W. Gold St., S. Cansler St., S. Tracy St., S. Watterson St., and S. Goforth St. 35°14′19″N 81°21′00″W	Kings Mountain	
30	West Warren Street Historic District	West Warren Street Historic District	May 12, 2009 (#09000331)	Roughly bounded by W. Warren, McBrayer, Blanton, and Whisnant Sts. 35°17′28″N 81°32′40″W	Shelby	

== See also ==
- National Register of Historic Places listings in North Carolina
- List of National Historic Landmarks in North Carolina
