= Stamey Company Store =

Historic commercial building in North Carolina, US

- U.S. National Register of Historic Places
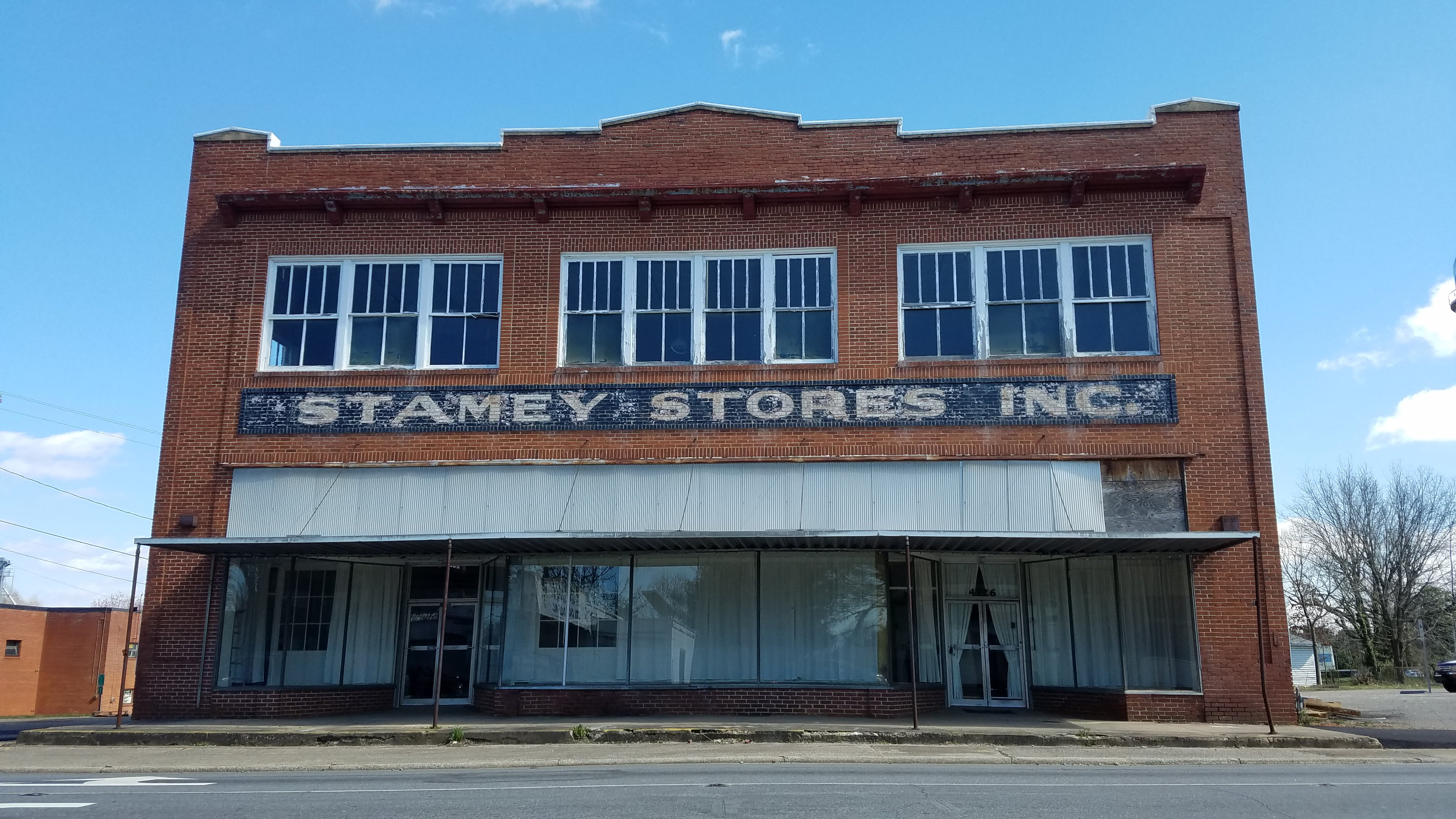

- Location within North Carolina
- Location: 4726 Fallston Road
- Nearest city: Fallston, North Carolina
- Coordinates: 35°25′41″N 81°30′4.5″W
- Built: 1927
- Architectural style: Commercial Style
- NRHP reference No.: 100003294
- Added to NRHP: January 10, 2019

The Stamey Company Store, commonly known as Stamey's by the local population of Fallston, North Carolina, is an historic commercial building located in the very center of town on the southeast corner of the singular stoplight at 4726 Fallston Road where NC Highway 18 intersects with NC Highway 182 (E Stage Coach Trail), an original stagecoach trail. The brick commercial building was completed in 1927 and added to the National Register of Historic Places on January 10, 2019.

== History ==
In 1890, brothers Thomas Stamey and Charles Stamey leased John Falls', the namesake for Fallston and Cleveland County Sheriff, storefront. The store was successful: in 1909, annual sales averaged $100,000. After a fire in their warehouses in 1925, the store was replaced with the current fire-resistant brick building, completed in 1927. The company continued to enjoy success until Charline Stamey passed in 1991. Without another Stamey family member to run the business, the store closed in 1994. From 1995 to 2013, the building was leased to a series of tenants. It is currently used as an event center.

== See also ==
- National Register of Historic Places listings in Cleveland County, North Carolina
