= Historic Campbell Building =

Campbell Building
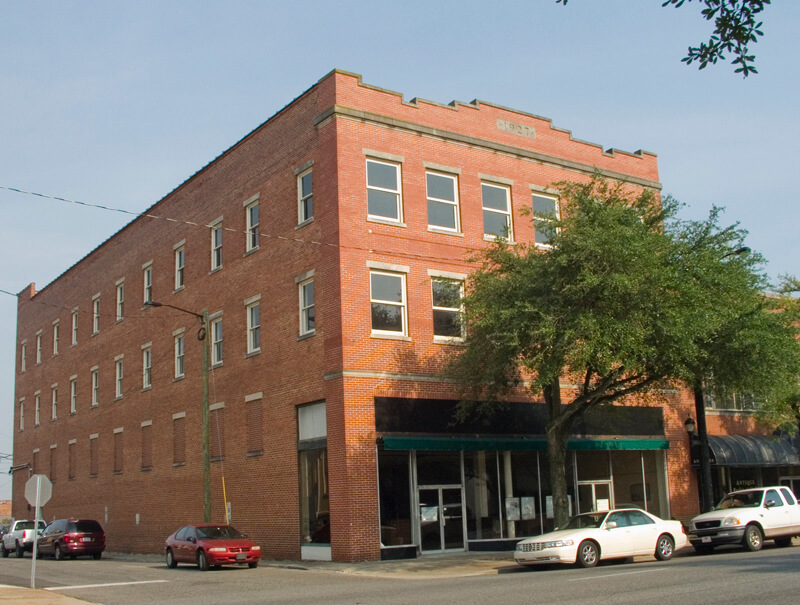
- Exterior of Campbell Building before rehabilitation.
- Interactive map of the Campbell Building area
- Former names: Campbell's Department Store

General information
- Location: 112 N. Lafayette Street, Shelby, North Carolina, United States
- Coordinates: 35.292555°N 81.539823°W
- Current tenants: Franklin Family; Uptown Indigo; Greenbrook Design Center
- Completed: December 1927
- Opened: January 1928

Technical details
- Size: Over 30,000 Square Feet

Design and construction
- Awards: North Carolina Main Street 2019 Conference Champions Wedding Wire 2019 Couples' Choice Award Historic Shelby Foundation 2018 Partners in Preservation Keep Shelby Beautiful 2018 Property of the Year Best of Cleveland County 2018 Best Place to Have a Birthday Party Commercial Appearance Award 2018

The Historic Campbell Building is a former department store in Shelby, North Carolina. Completed in 1927, the building's grand opening as The Campbell's Department Store took place on March 9, 1928. The building is significant for its type of brick and steel construction, finishing, unique craftsmanship, and history with local families. The building was rehabilitated between October 2015 and June 2018

== History of Campbell Business ==
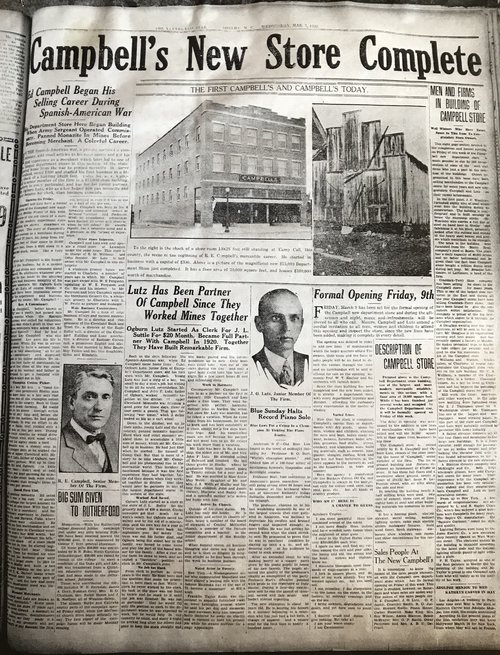
A January, 1928 newspaper.

Prior to the grand opening of the final Campbell's Department Store, Reuben Edgar Campbell (1878-1955) married Ester Yelton. After working in a monazite mine, he built and operated a local general store. Later, Campbell opened a second general store in Shelby, where he lived above the retail operations in 1916. A 1917 newspaper reported that the store sold boys and men's clothing, trucks, gabs, shoes, millinery, dress goods, ladies and children's clothes, groceries, drugs, and furniture. He opened a third store on November 9, 1923, in nearby Lawndale, North Carolina, a thriving textile center. The building was owned by Campbell and J. Ogburn Lutz. These two men were highly successful in the retail trade, and in 1927 completed building their flagship store in Shelby, the fourth Campbell's Department Store. At this time they focused attention on this store and closed all of their other operations. At the time of construction, the building was among the tallest in Shelby, and used all local materials.

== Grand opening ==
The Campbell Building was immediately emblematic of local craftsmanship and a source of pride for every Shelbian who contributed work on the project. At its opening the Cleveland Star noted in an article on March 7, 1928 that the Bostic Brick Company of Bostic, North Carolina provided all of the brick. Eighty tons of structural steel was manufactured and used in the building by J.C. Weathers of Shelby, North Carolina; and the millwork for the flooring, stairs, and show windows were completed by A.J. Thompson of Shelby. The 30,000 square foot, five-level building was a full service department store selling groceries, bedding, hats, yard goods, footwear, furniture, appliances, farm supplies, toys, caskets, and clothing for women, men, and children. There was also a beloved bargain basement. For many years, a camel, Campbell's trademark, was painted on the exposed south side of the building. This billboard-like emblem has now disappeared from the brick. Campbell's was known locally for its elaborately ornamented pressed tin ceilings and mezzanine lunchroom. Many Cleveland County locals still recall the Campbell department store. One local woman said, "You'd walk up those stairs to the second floor and take a right, and you'd see the most beautiful Sunday dresses in the world!"

== Shelby in the late 1920s ==
At the time that Campbell's opened their big store in 1927, Shelby was thriving economically. The town was accessible by railroad, close to Charlotte, North Carolina, and served as a center for trade for the booming textile industries throughout Cleveland and Mecklenburg counties. By 1930, the population of Shelby had grown to 12,000 people. The town was "the leading shopping center between Charlotte and Asheville". By 1935, State Highway 20 had been completed which allowed for a bus service to the town. A new High School was scheduled to be built at the cost of $150,000. There were over eight churches, a public library, a modern hospital, and electricity and water systems in place and many Federal improvement programs were underway. In 1929, the earliest Shelby City Directory available after Campbell's was opened, noted that other stores in operation included Efird's, Paragon, Montgomery Ward, J.C. Penney, A.V. Wray & 6 Sons, Carolina Stores, Charles Stores, Acorn, Haines, Ingram-Liles, and McNeely and Company. All of them, except for Campbell's and A.V. Wray, were part of much larger department store chains. Of the remaining buildings, only Campbell's and Efird's retain their original architecture and a high degree of integrity on their exterior.

== Present day ==
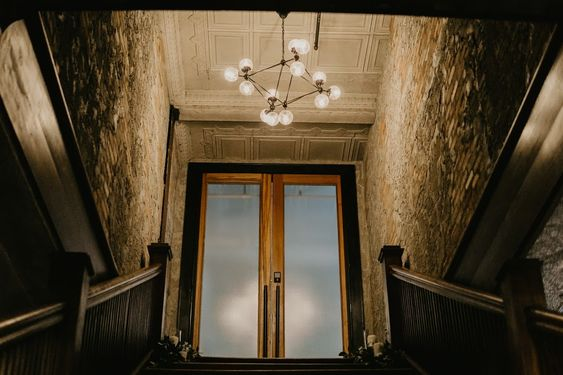
Wooden staircase in the building

Although the Campbell Department Store closed in 1950, the building stayed in the same family, later becoming a furniture store for 25 years, a restaurant, and then sitting dormant for 12 years. In 2014, a Shelby family became the second family to own the Campbell Building. Preservation of the historic elements of the building was important to the Franklin family; therefore, they spent three full years rehabilitating the building before reopening it to the community. The Campbell Building retains a high degree of architectural integrity even today. At over 30,000 square feet in size, the building preserves extensive features on its interior, including its original mezzanine and railing overlooking the first floor, tin ceilings on all levels, wood floors, and most significantly, the original grand wooden staircase which extended from the ground floor all the way to the third floor. An 800 square foot rooftop terrace was added to the building making it the tallest rooftop terrace between Charlotte and Asheville, NC. After completing their work, the Franklin family opened an event venue, Uptown Indigo, on the second and third floors as well as the rooftop. The first floor and mezzanine is home to the Greenbrook Design Center. The Historic Campbell building is a member of the Central Shelby Historic District.
