= Shelby Cotton Mill =

Historic house in North Carolina, United States

- U.S. National Register of Historic Places
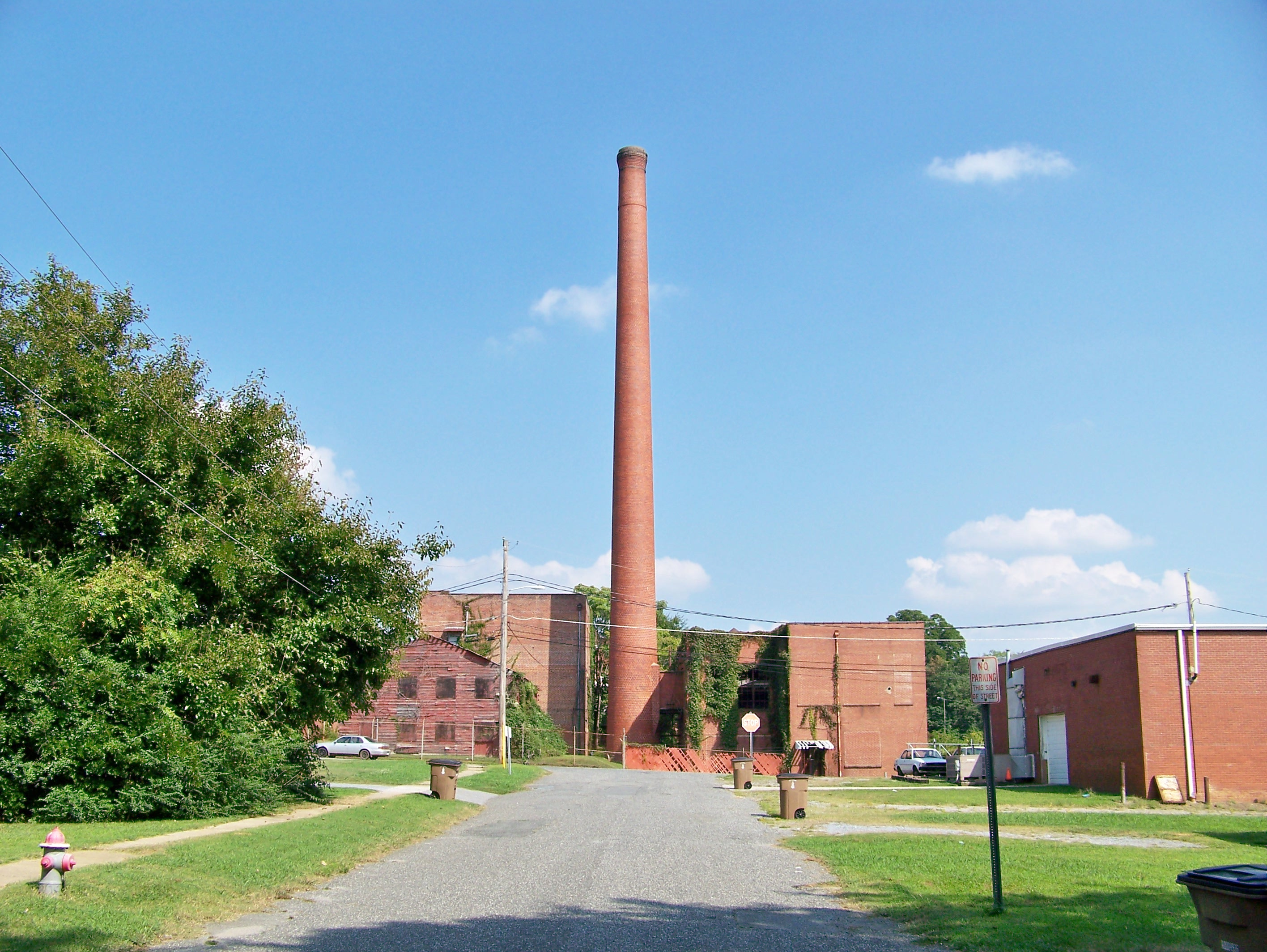
- Shelby Cotton Mill on September 9, 2013,

- Location within North Carolina Location within the United States
- Location: 500 S. Morgan St., Shelby, North Carolina
- Coordinates: 35°17′09″N 81°32′33″W
- Built: 1900
- NRHP reference No.: 15000898
- Added to NRHP: December 15, 2015

Shelby Cotton Mill is an historical textile mill located in Shelby, North Carolina. Built in 1900, it is listed on the National Register of Historic Places.

== History ==
The mill was opened in April 1900. And by 1901, the mill was expanded with 8,784 ring spindles, 250 broad looms, and 14 carding machines. By 1920s, it became Cleveland County's largest textile mill manufacturing yam and "pajama check".
