= Cleveland County Training School =

Historic school building in North Carolina, US

- U.S. National Register of Historic Places
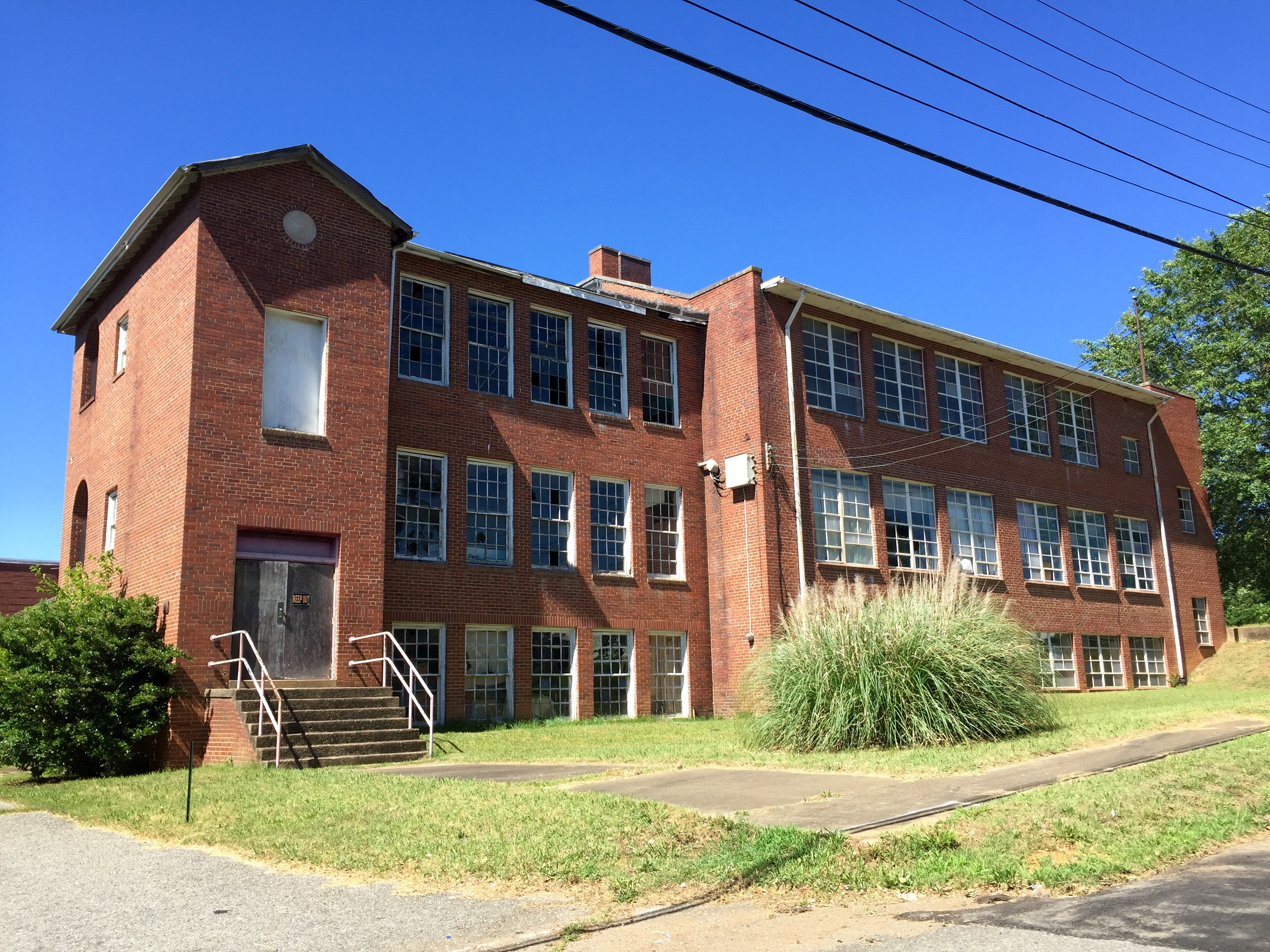
- Cleveland County Training School (June 18, 2020)

- Location within North Carolina Location within the United States
- Location: 341 Hudson St., Shelby, North Carolina
- Coordinates: 35°17′56″N 81°32′00″W
- Area: 3.45 acres (1.40 ha)
- Built: 1895
- Architect: V. W . Breeze (main building, 1951); Van Wageningen and Cothran (gymnasium, 1960)
- Architectural style: Modern Movement
- NRHP reference No.: 16000220
- Added to NRHP: May 2, 2016

Cleveland County Training School was a historic school for African-Americans in Shelby, North Carolina. It was included in National Register of Historic Places in 2016.

== History ==
The school was built in 1895 and it was open until 1957, when it was replaced by newly constructed Hunter Elementary School (on Pinkney Street). However, till 1977, the school educated up to sixth grade. But, in 1985, Christ Temple Apostolic Faith Church purchased the property.

In 2016, Willie Green, a former professional basketball player and current coach of Phoenix Suns purchased the property to establish Carolina Athletic Sports Academy (CASA) - a training facility for the local and national athletes.

== Notable alumni ==
- Ella Mae Colbert
