= Double Shoals Cotton Mill =

Historic industrial building in North Carolina

- U.S. National Register of Historic Places
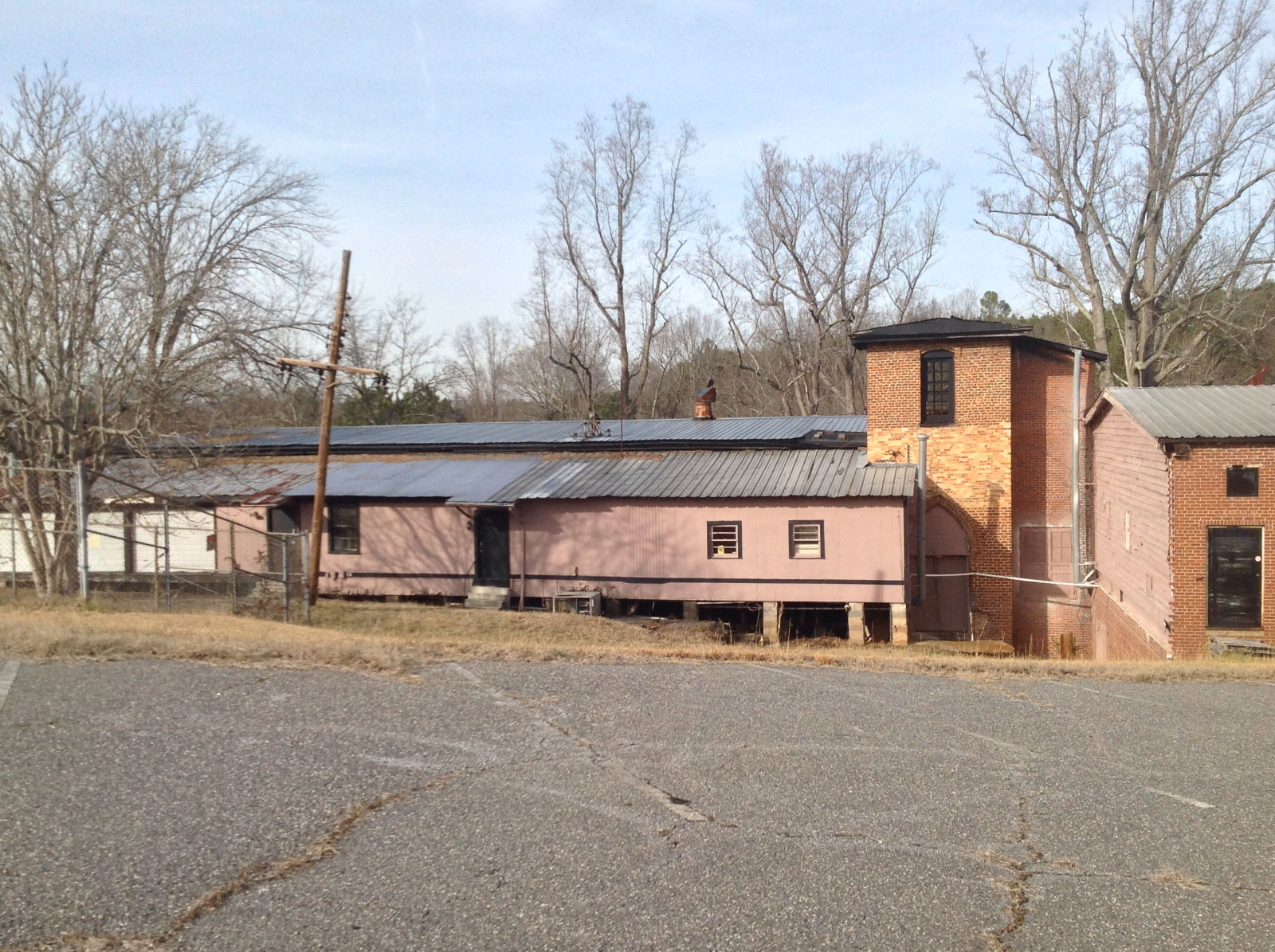
- 2015

- Location within North Carolina Location within the United States
- Location: 199 Old Mill Rd., Shelby, North Carolina
- Coordinates: 35°22′51″N 81°32′43″W
- Area: 15 acres (6.1 ha)
- Built: c. 1874
- Architectural style: Italianate, Slow-burning construction
- NRHP reference No.: 08000775
- Added to NRHP: March 24, 2009

Double Shoals Cotton Mill is a historic post-Civil War textile mill located at Cleveland County, North Carolina. It is a 2 1/2-story, brick building with a shallow-pitched, side-gable-roof and Italianate style design elements. Also on the property are a contributing mill race and dam, built about 1880.

== History ==
Thomas R. Jackson deeded 268 acres to Albert A. Homsley. Homsley eventually built a mill building in 1855 that became the precursor to the Double Shoals Mill. The building and land changed hands in 1867 and again in 1874 when it was sold to E. A. Morgan, with additions made in 1965 and in the 1970s. He named the mill Double Shoals Mill Company. Other names for the mill were the Double Shoals Manufacturing Company and Lucky Strike Yarn Mill, north of Shelby, North Carolina. The Morgan family continued to run the mill until 1919. Throughout the 1900’s, the mill changed owners several times until it ceased all manufacturing in the 1980’s. Throughout the years of operation, the manufacturing products included: cloth, cotton yarn, twine, other types of yarn, rugs, and car seat covering material.

== Present ==
The building is currently under renovations for use as an indoor and outdoor event venue, an auto restoration shop, and art classes are also held there.. It was listed on the National Register of Historic Places in 2009.

In 2016 work began to transform the once abandoned mill into something special. The first action was to convert the lower level for use as a custom car shop, Fabbit Customs. Then the outdoor spaces began taking space for use as event space. Now the upper level is being converted into space for an art studio and event space.

== Gallery ==
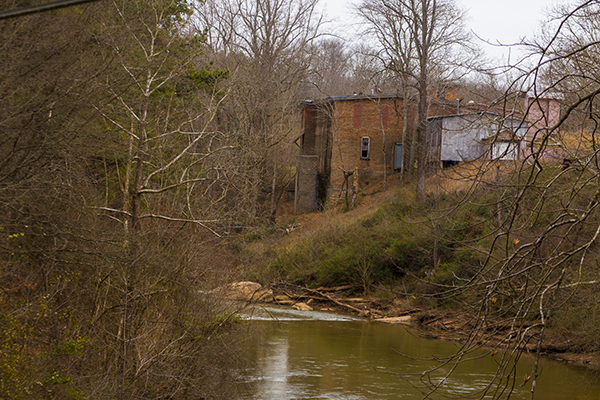
Double Shoals Cotton Mill as seen from the bridge

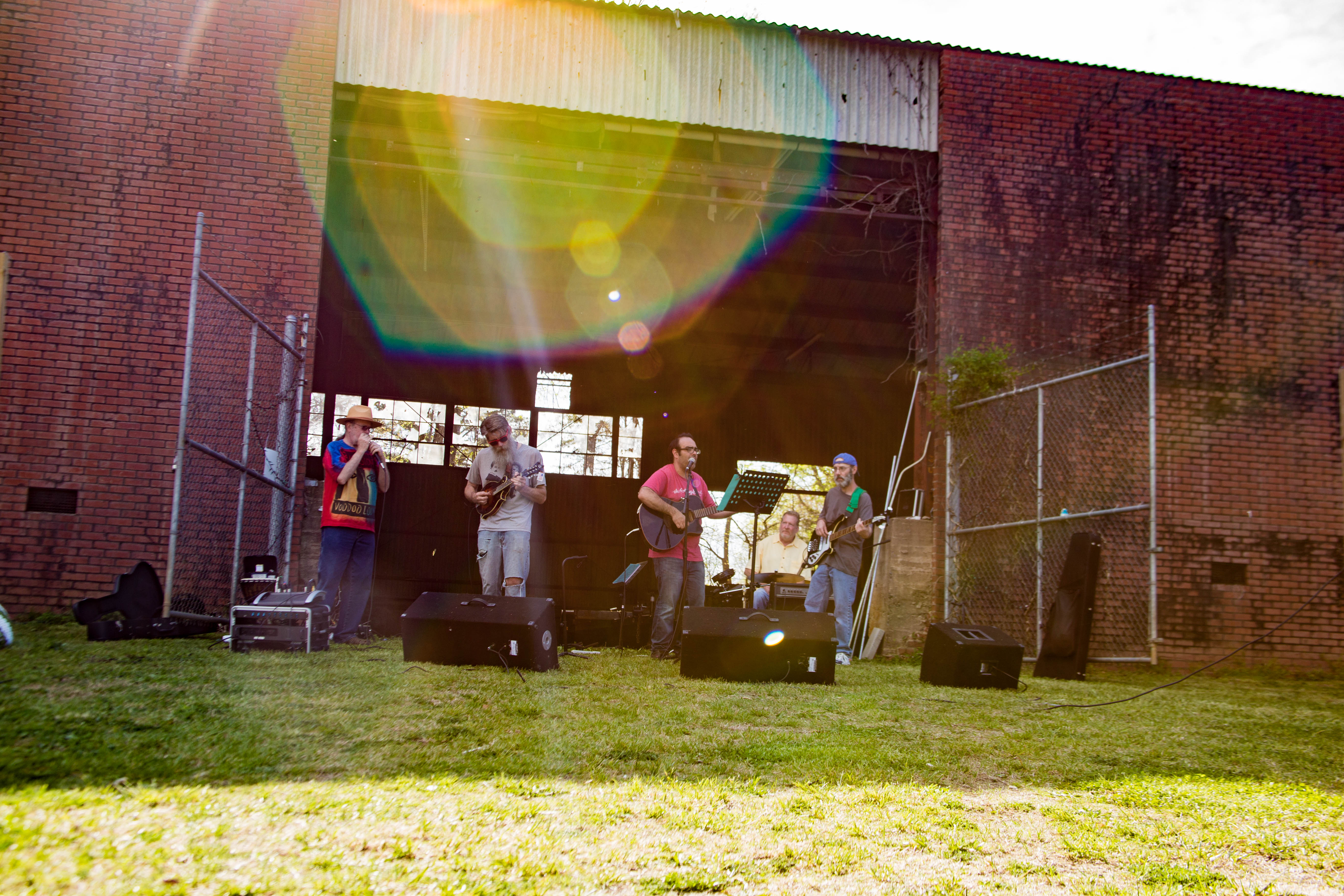
Live music performed on the back lawn at Double Shoals Cotton Mill

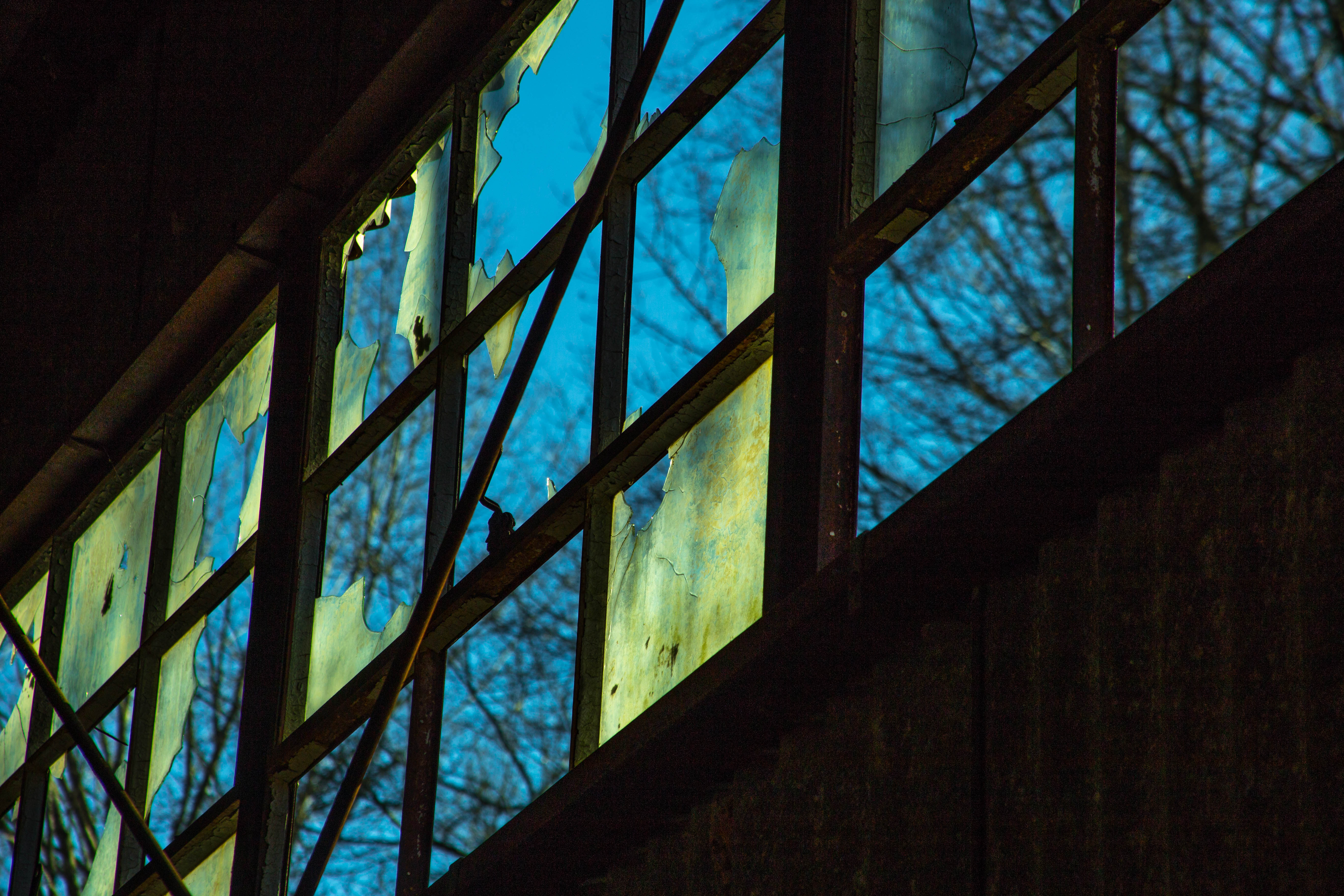
Broken glass in the ruins of Double Shoals Cotton Mill

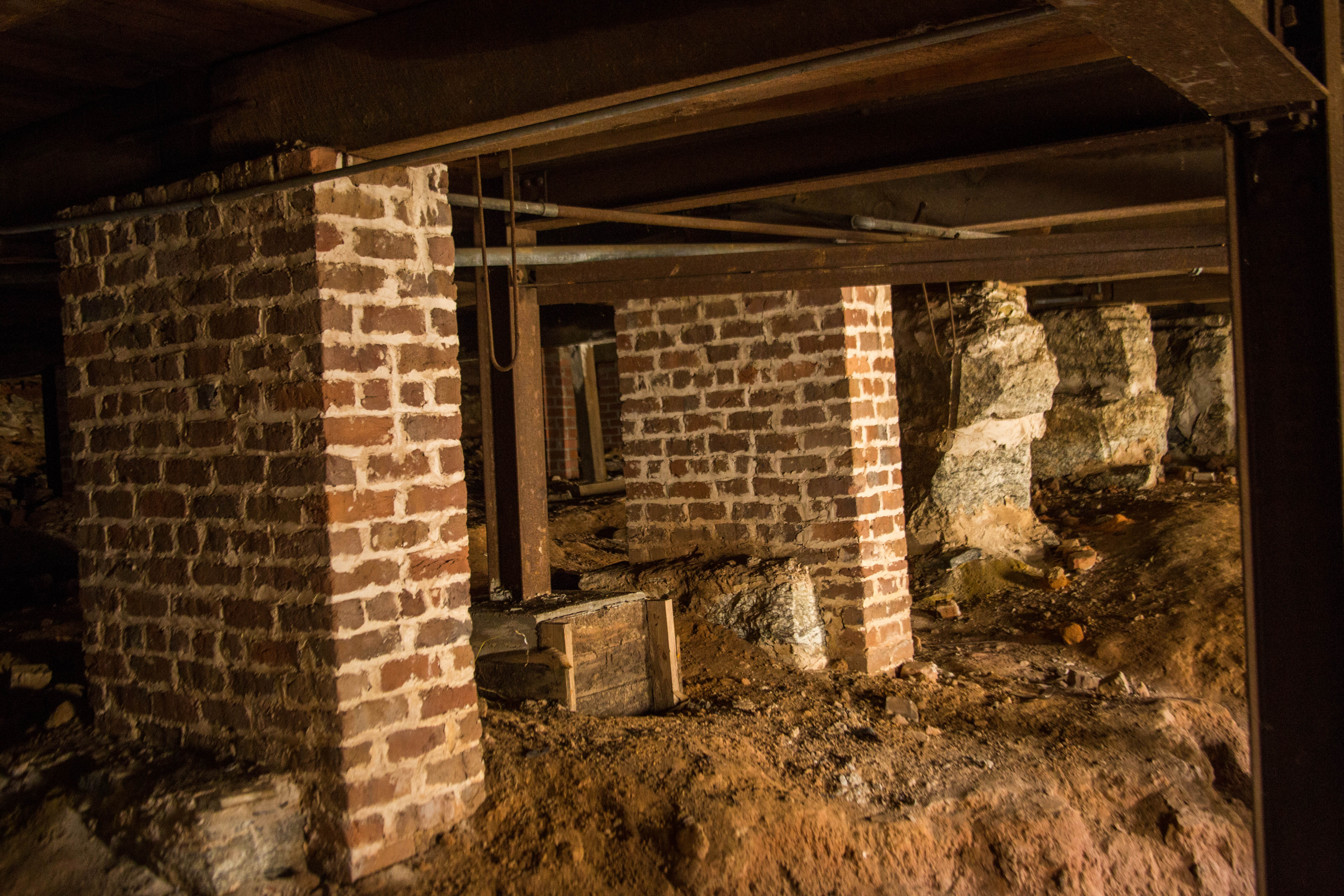
The foundation under Double Shoals Cotton Mill

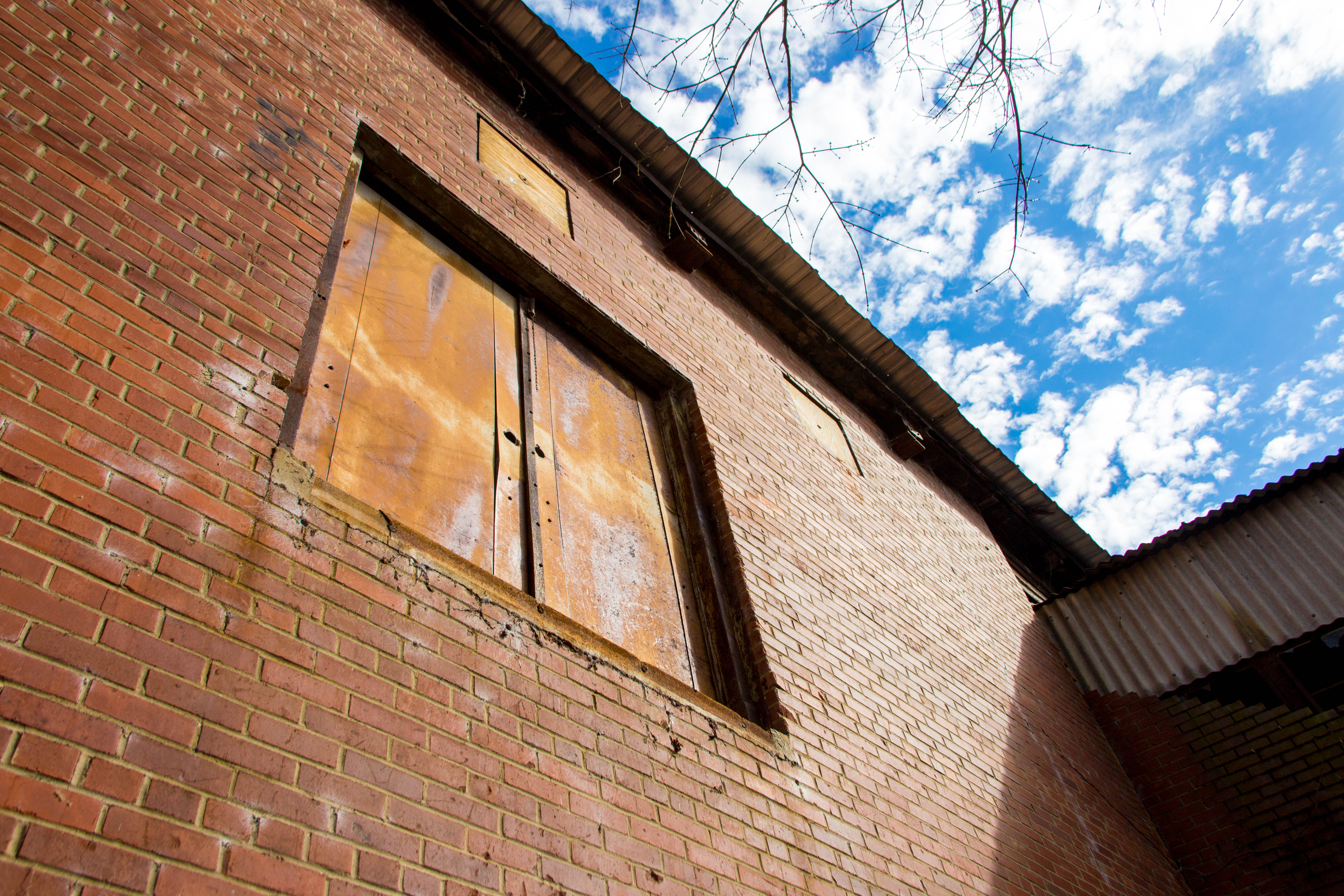
The doors to nowhere

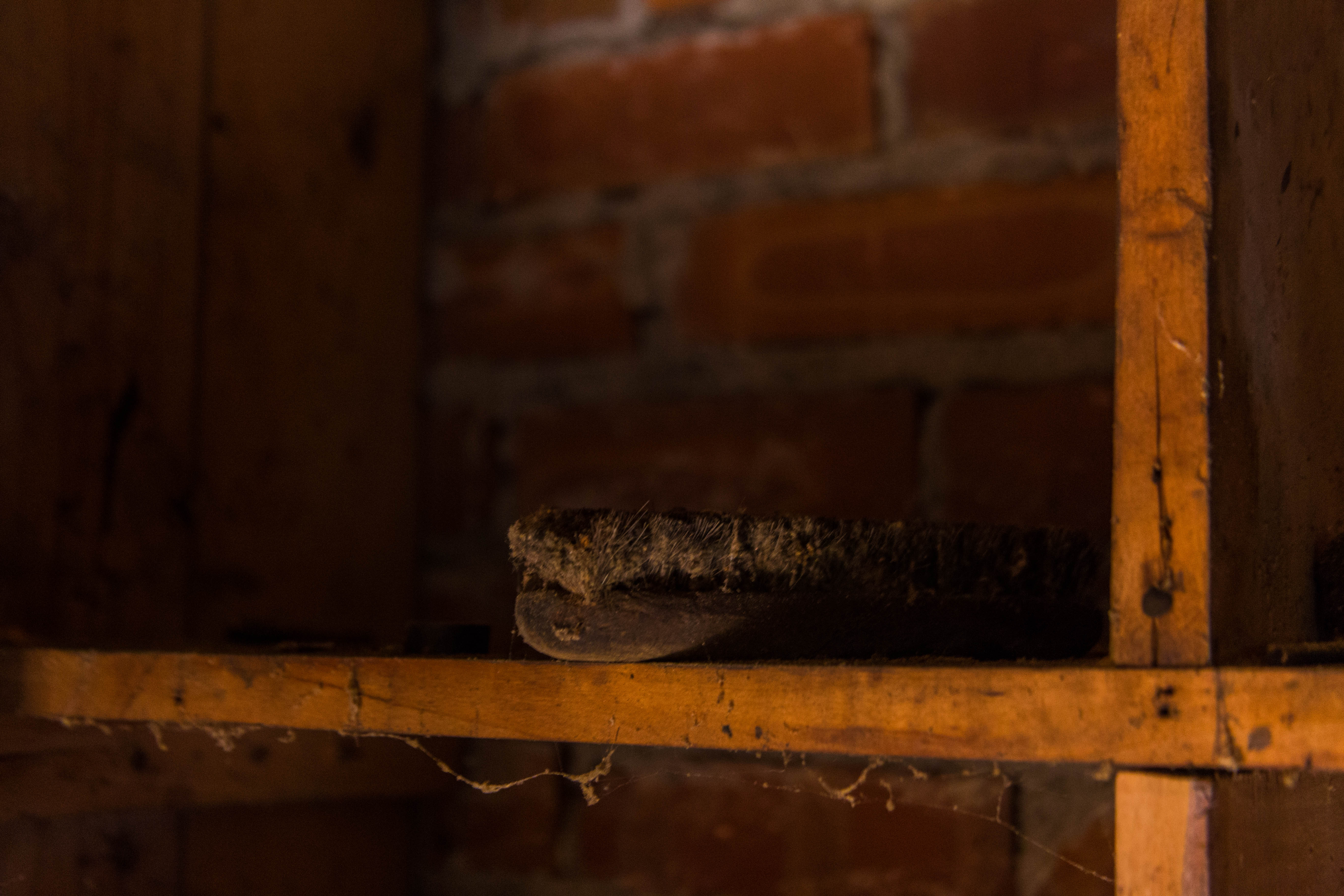
Old carding brush on a shelf at Double Shoals Cotton Mill

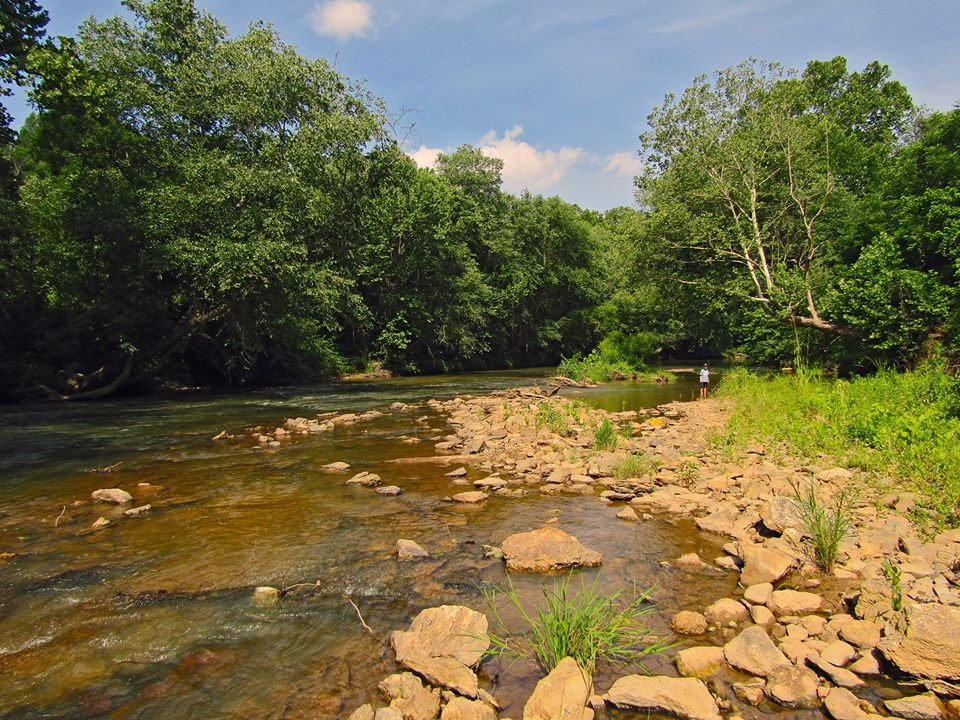
First Broad River located behind Double Shoals Cotton Mill

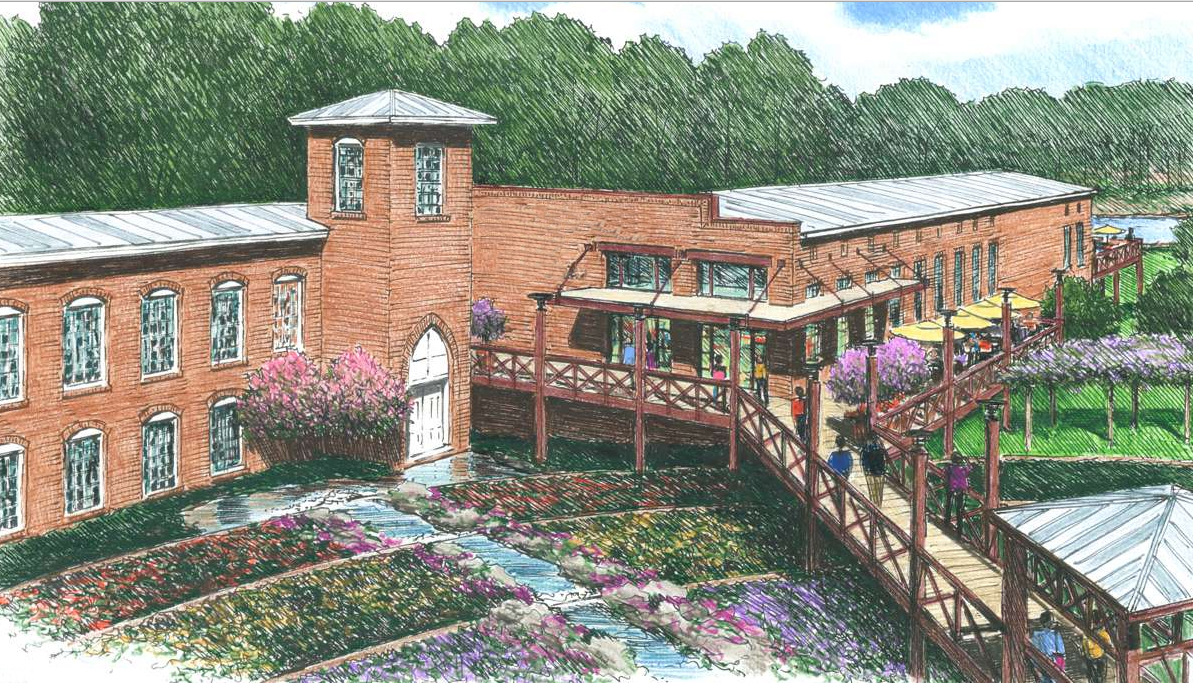
Rendering from the new owners website showing the future of this historic property
