= Kings Mountain Historical Museum =

- United States Post Office
- U.S. National Register of Historic Places
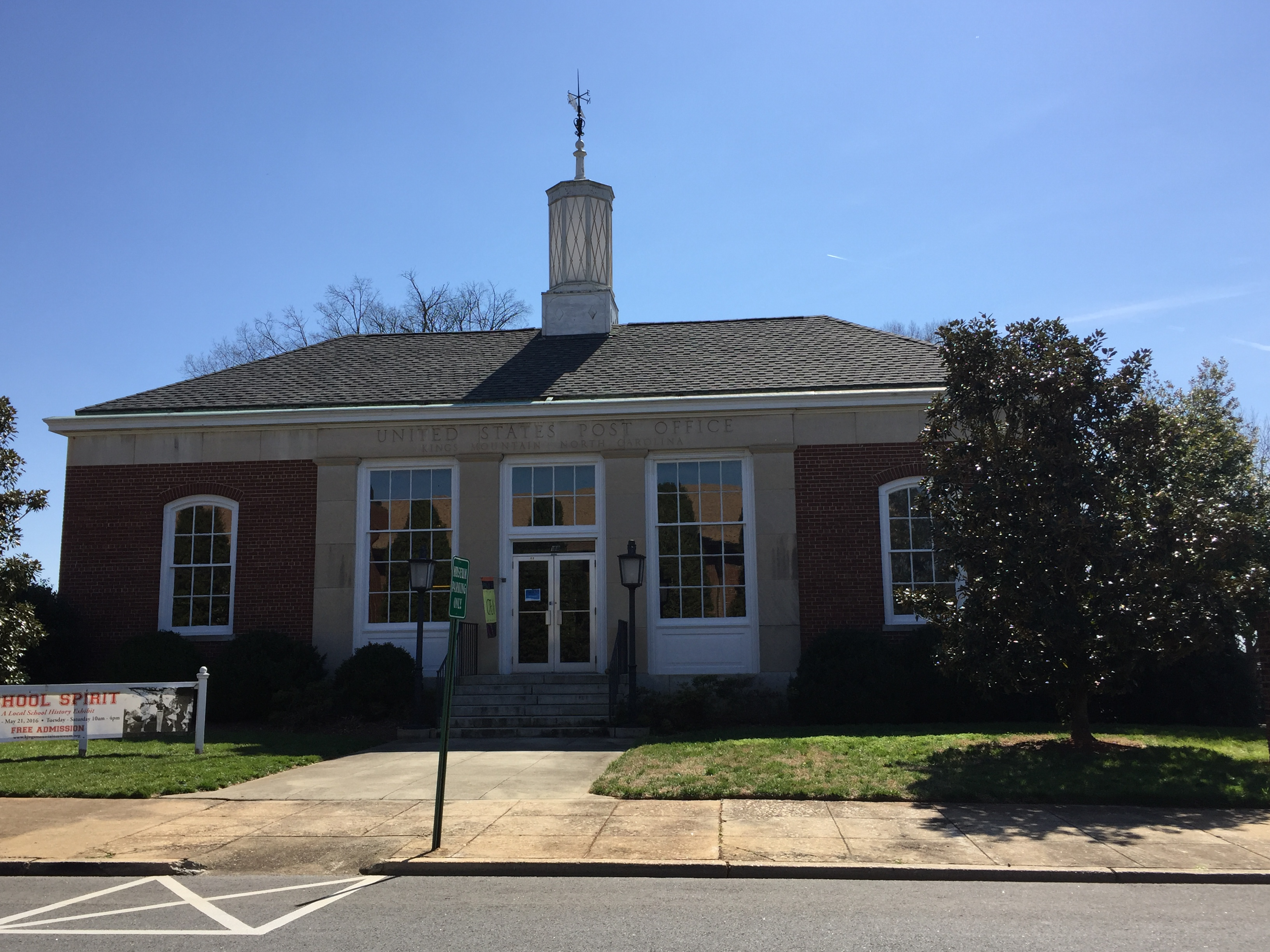

- Location within North Carolina Location within the United States
- Location: 100 E. Mountain., Kings Mountain, North Carolina
- Coordinates: 35°14′21″N 81°20′32″W
- Area: Less than one acre
- Built: 1940
- Architectural style: Colonial Revival
- NRHP reference No.: 15000202
- Added to NRHP: April 29, 2015

The Kings Mountain Historical Museum is a local history museum at 100 East Mountain in Kings Mountain, North Carolina. It is located in the former United States Post Office building, a handsome Colonial Revival structure built in 1940 with funding from a Depression-era works program. The building was used as a post office until 1986. The city acquired the building in 2000 and leased it to the local historical society, which has used it as a museum since.

The building was listed on the National Register of Historic Places in 2015.

== See also ==
- National Register of Historic Places listings in Cleveland County, North Carolina
