= Dr. Victor McBrayer House =

Historic house in North Carolina, United States

- U.S. National Register of Historic Places
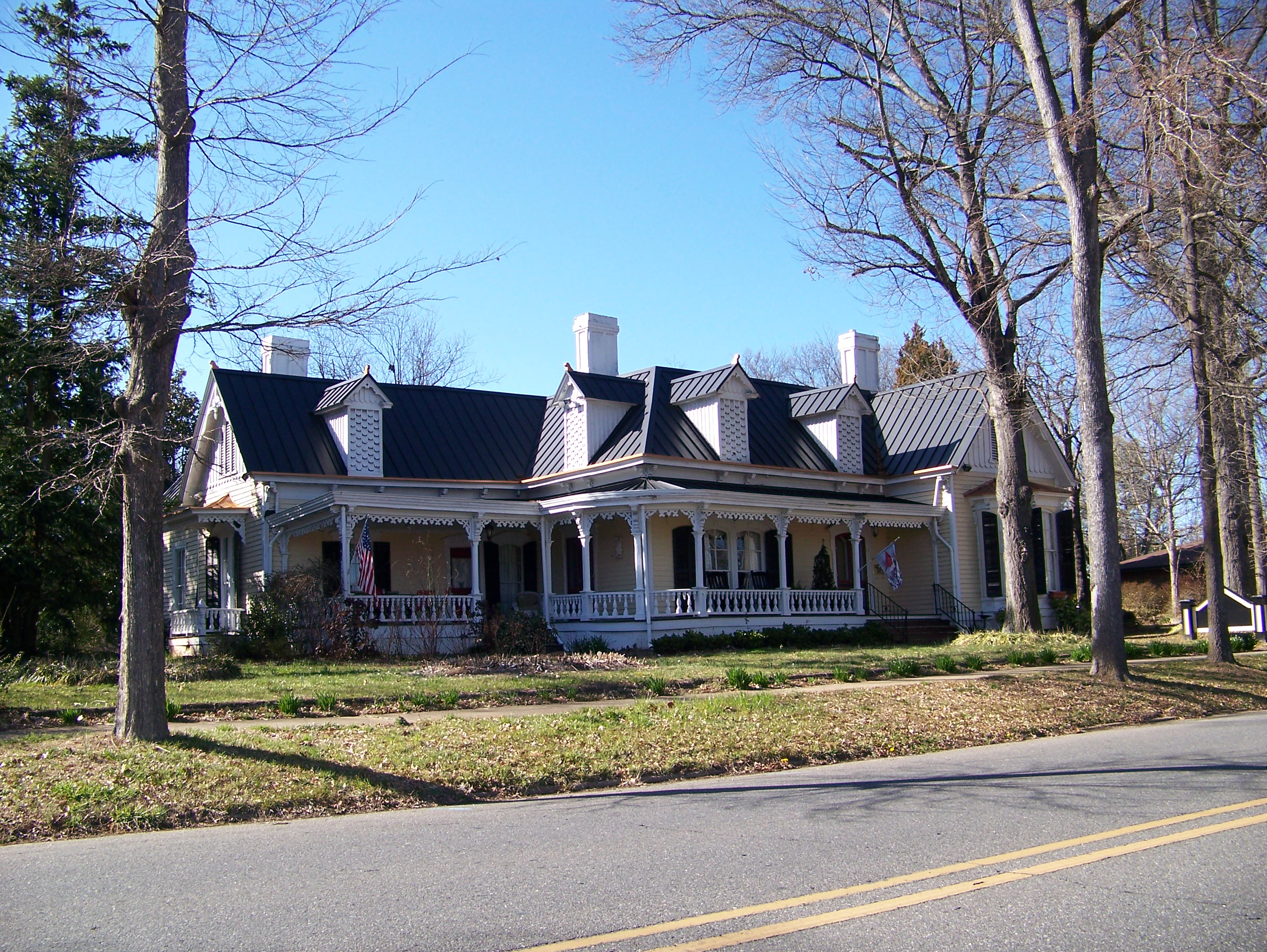

- Location within North Carolina Location within the United States
- Location: 507 N. Morgan St., Shelby, North Carolina
- Coordinates: 35°17′39″N 81°32′30″W
- Area: 0.5 acres (0.20 ha)
- Built: 1893
- Architectural style: Mixed (more Than 2 Styles From Different Periods)
- NRHP reference No.: 79001694
- Added to NRHP: May 31, 1979

Dr. Victor McBrayer House, also known as Owen House, is a historic home located near Shelby, Cleveland County, North Carolina. It was built in 1893, and is a 1 1/2-story, modified "U"-plan, eclectic frame dwelling with Italianate, Gothic Revival, and Queen Anne style design elements. It features a rich array of sawn and turned ornament.

It was listed on the National Register of Historic Places in 1979.
