= East Marion–Belvedere Park Historic District =

Historic district in North Carolina, United States

- U.S. National Register of Historic Places
- U.S. Historic district
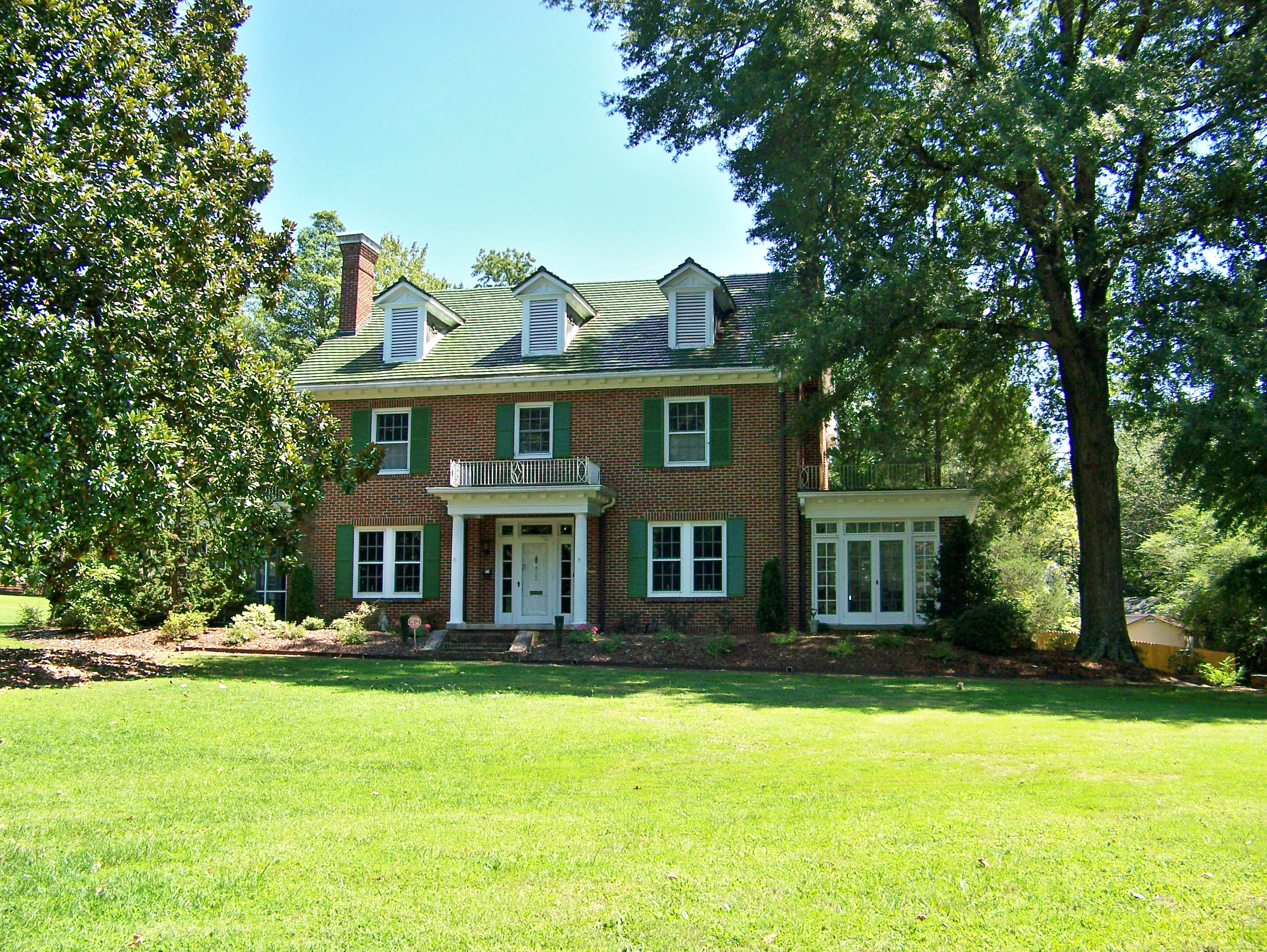
- Julius Suttle House

- Location within North Carolina Location within the United States
- Location: Roughly bounded by Cline, Chestnut, E. Marion Sts., Edgemont Ave, Belvedere Aves., and Elizabeth Rd., Shelby, North Carolina
- Coordinates: 35°17′28″N 81°32′40″W
- Area: 65 acres (26 ha)
- Built: c. 1921-1952
- Built by: Colyer, Leigh; Hendrick, R.L.
- Architectural style: Bungalow/craftsman, Colonial Revival
- NRHP reference No.: 02001667
- Added to NRHP: December 31, 2002

East Marion–Belvedere Park Historic District is a national historic district located at Shelby, Cleveland County, North Carolina. It encompasses 123 contributing buildings in a residential section of Shelby. The houses date between about 1921 and 1952, and include representative examples of Colonial Revival and Bungalow / American Craftsman architectural styles.

It was listed on the National Register of Historic Places in 2002.

== Gallery ==
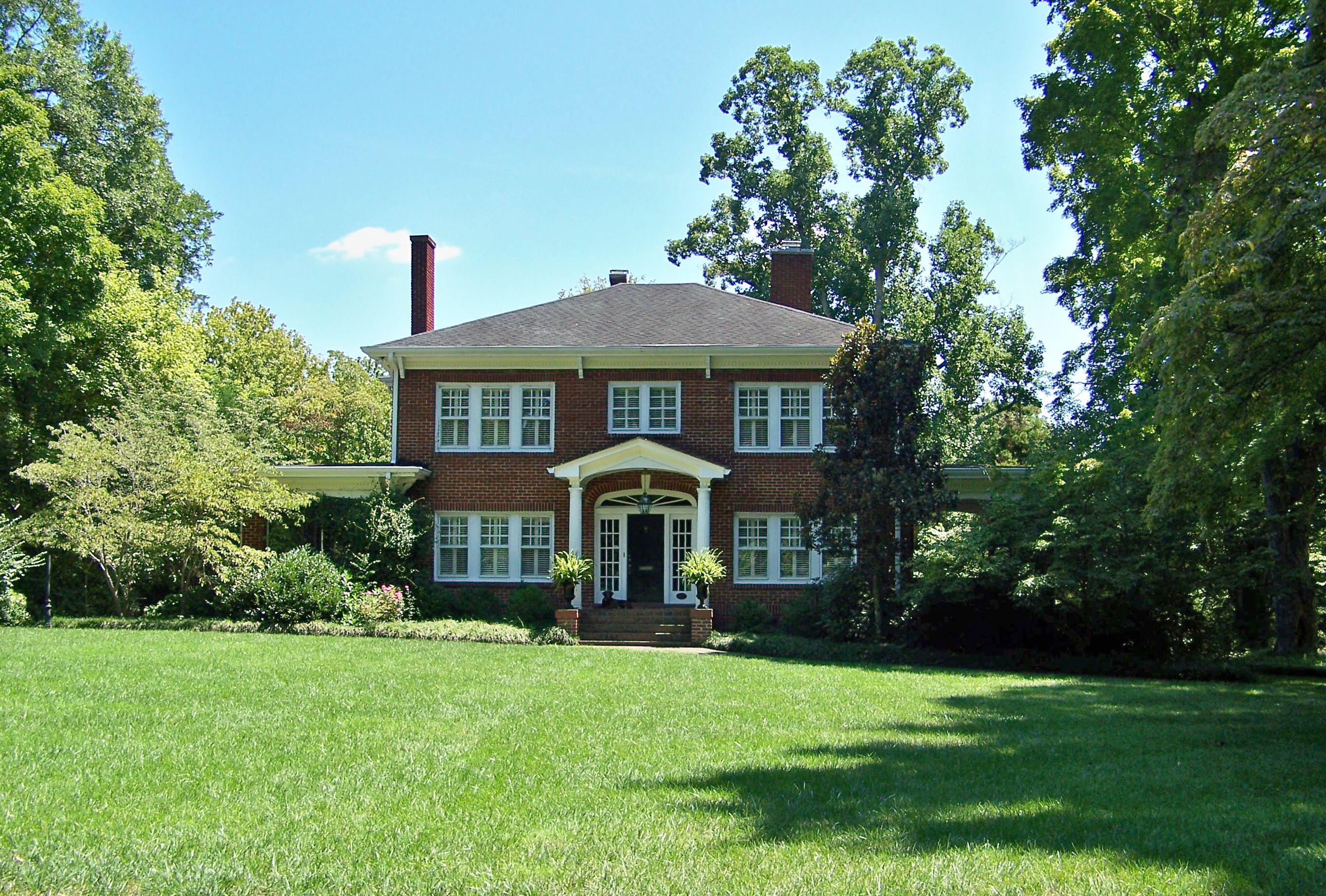
M.A. Spangler House

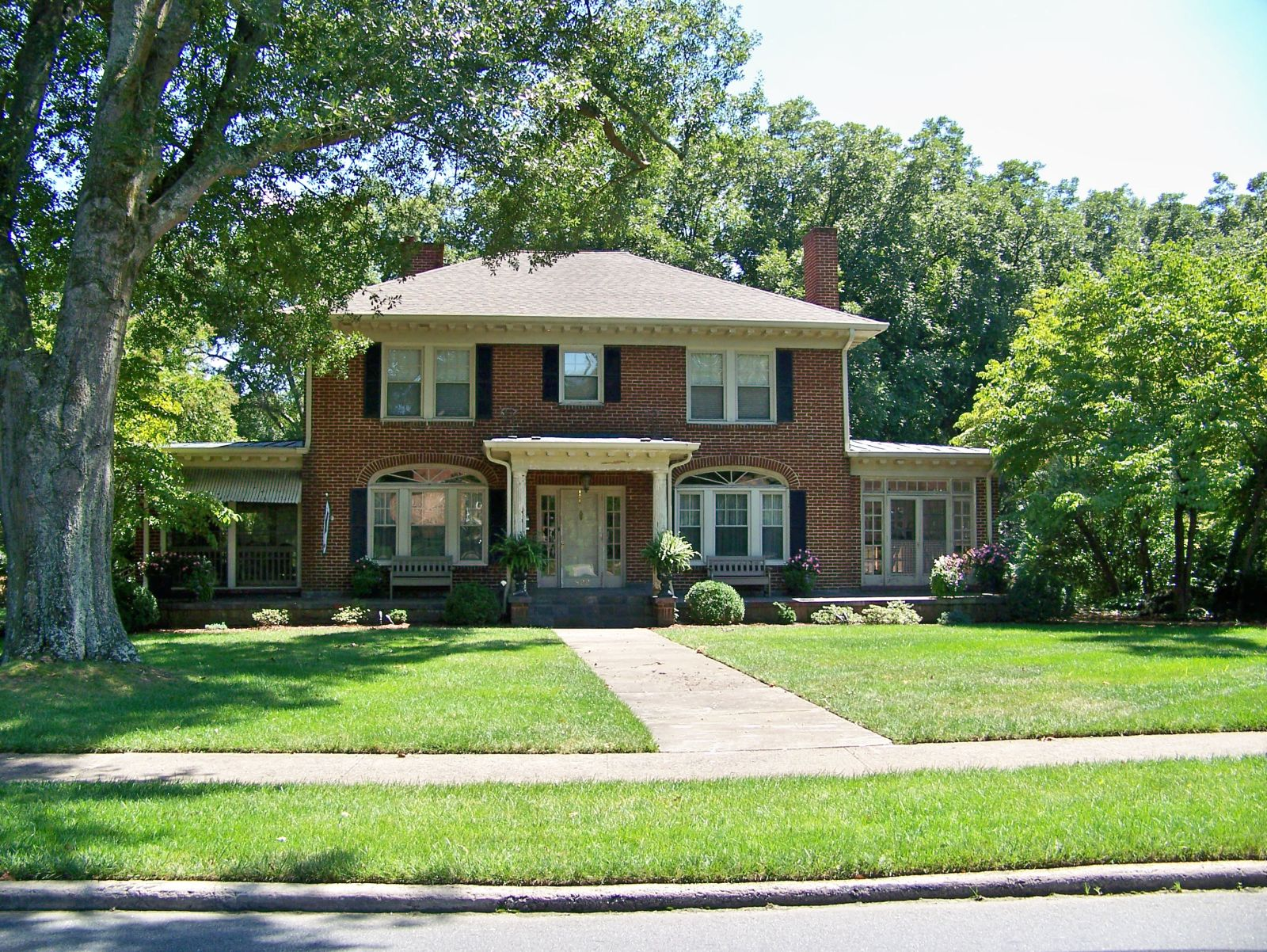
Holly Ledford House
