= Joseph Suttle House =

Historic house in North Carolina, United States

- U.S. National Register of Historic Places
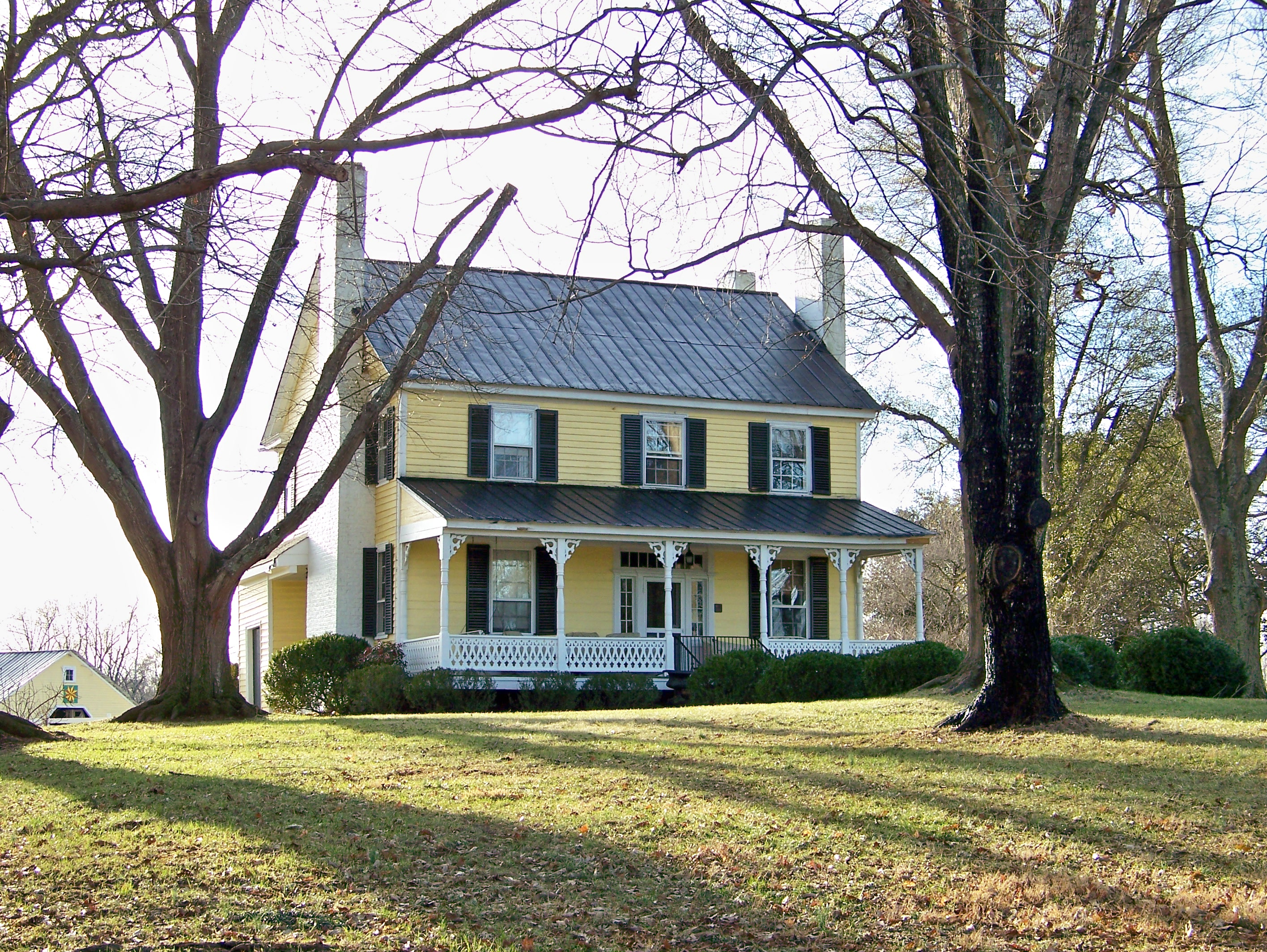

- Location within North Carolina Location within the United States
- Location: Southwest of Shelby, near Shelby, North Carolina
- Coordinates: 35°15′55″N 81°35′09″W
- Area: 128 acres (52 ha)
- Built: c. 1820-1847
- Architectural style: Federal, Vernacular Federal
- NRHP reference No.: 80002814
- Added to NRHP: July 17, 1980

Joseph Suttle House, also known as Twin Chimneys, is a historic home located near Shelby, Cleveland County, North Carolina. It was built between 1820 and 1847, and is a two-story, three-bay, gable-roofed frame dwelling with Federal style design elements. It features two stuccoed, smooth shouldered exterior chimneys. Also on the property are a contributing smokehouse and family cemetery.

It was listed on the National Register of Historic Places in 1980.
