= West Warren Street Historic District =

Historic district in North Carolina, United States

- U.S. National Register of Historic Places
- U.S. Historic district
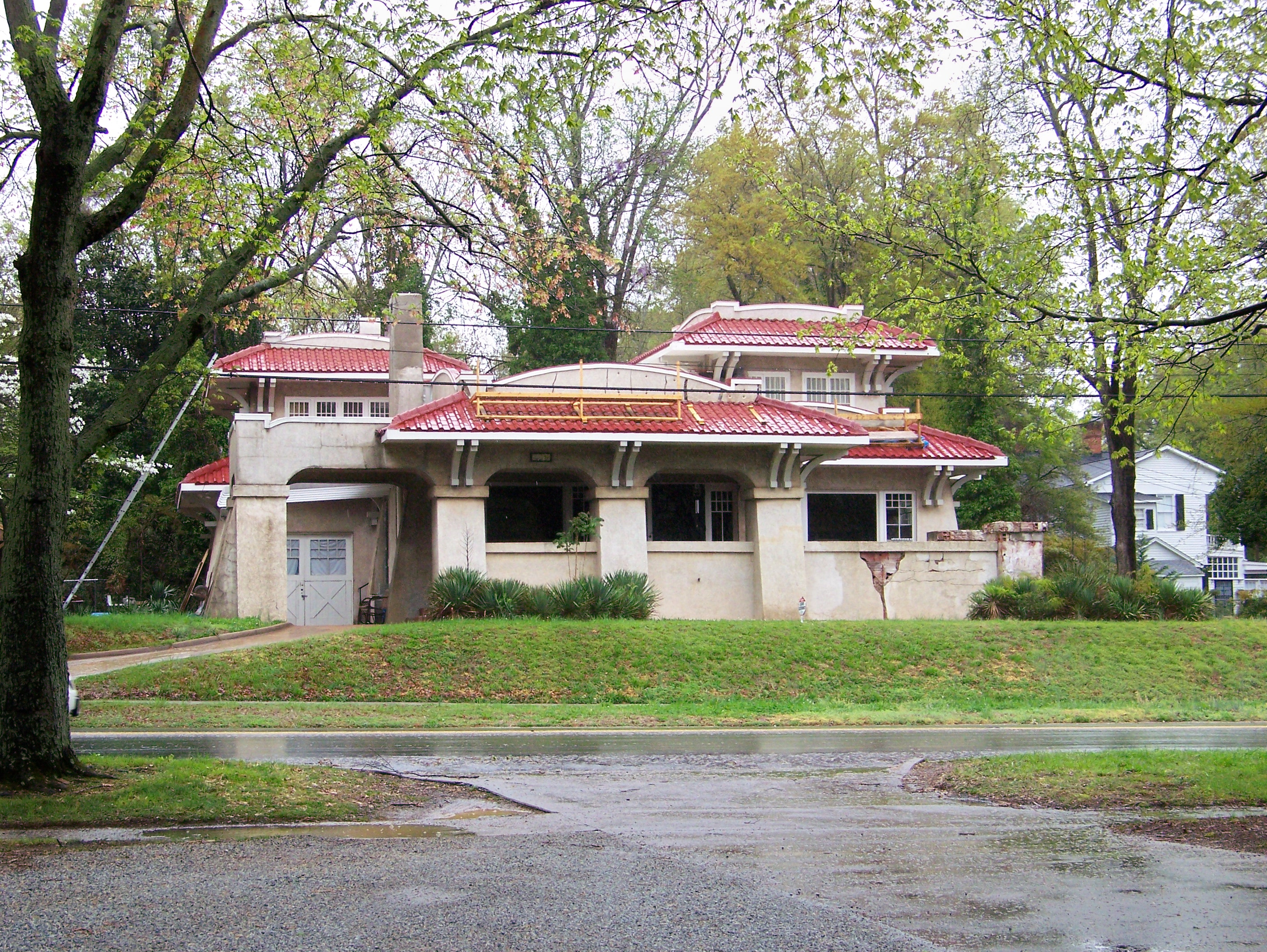
- El Nido

- Location within North Carolina Location within the United States
- Location: Roughly bounded by W. Warren, McBrayer, Blanton, and Whisnant Sts., Shelby, North Carolina
- Coordinates: 35°17′28″N 81°32′40″W
- Area: 60 acres (24 ha)
- Built: 1918
- Built by: Aurelia-Swanson Company, OK
- Architectural style: Late Victorian, Queen Anne, Bungalow/craftsman
- NRHP reference No.: 09000331
- Added to NRHP: May 12, 2009

West Warren Street Historic District is a national historic district located at Shelby, Cleveland County, North Carolina. It encompasses 176 contributing buildings, one contributing site, and one contributing object in a residential section of Shelby. The houses date between about 1918 and the 1940s, and include representative examples of Late Victorian, Queen Anne, and Bungalow / American Craftsman architectural styles. Notable nonresidential buildings include the Graham Elementary School drinking fountain (1927–1928) and Young Brothers Storage Building (1940s).

It was listed on the National Register of Historic Places in 2009.

== Gallery ==
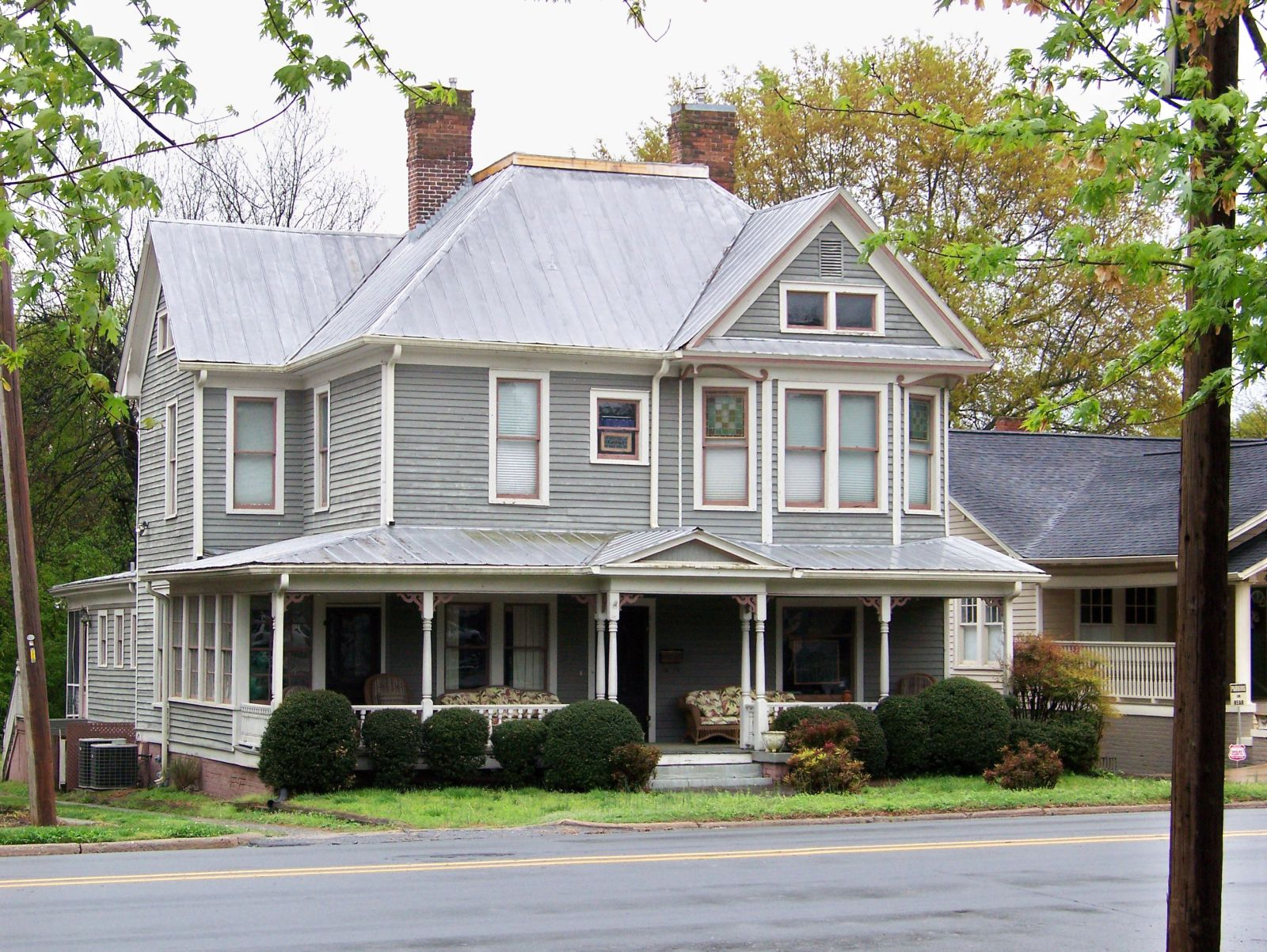
413 West Warren St.

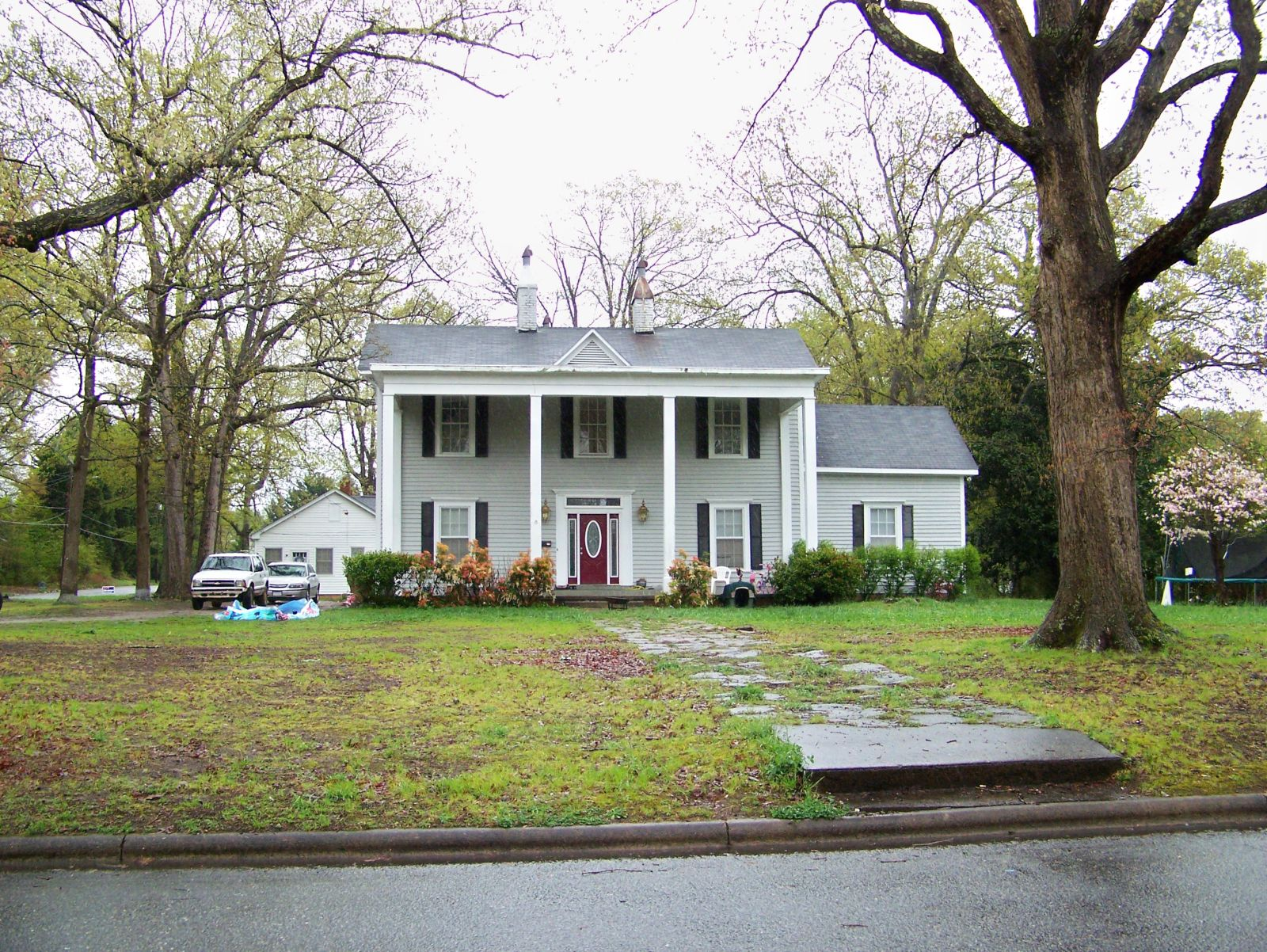
Durham-Whisnant House

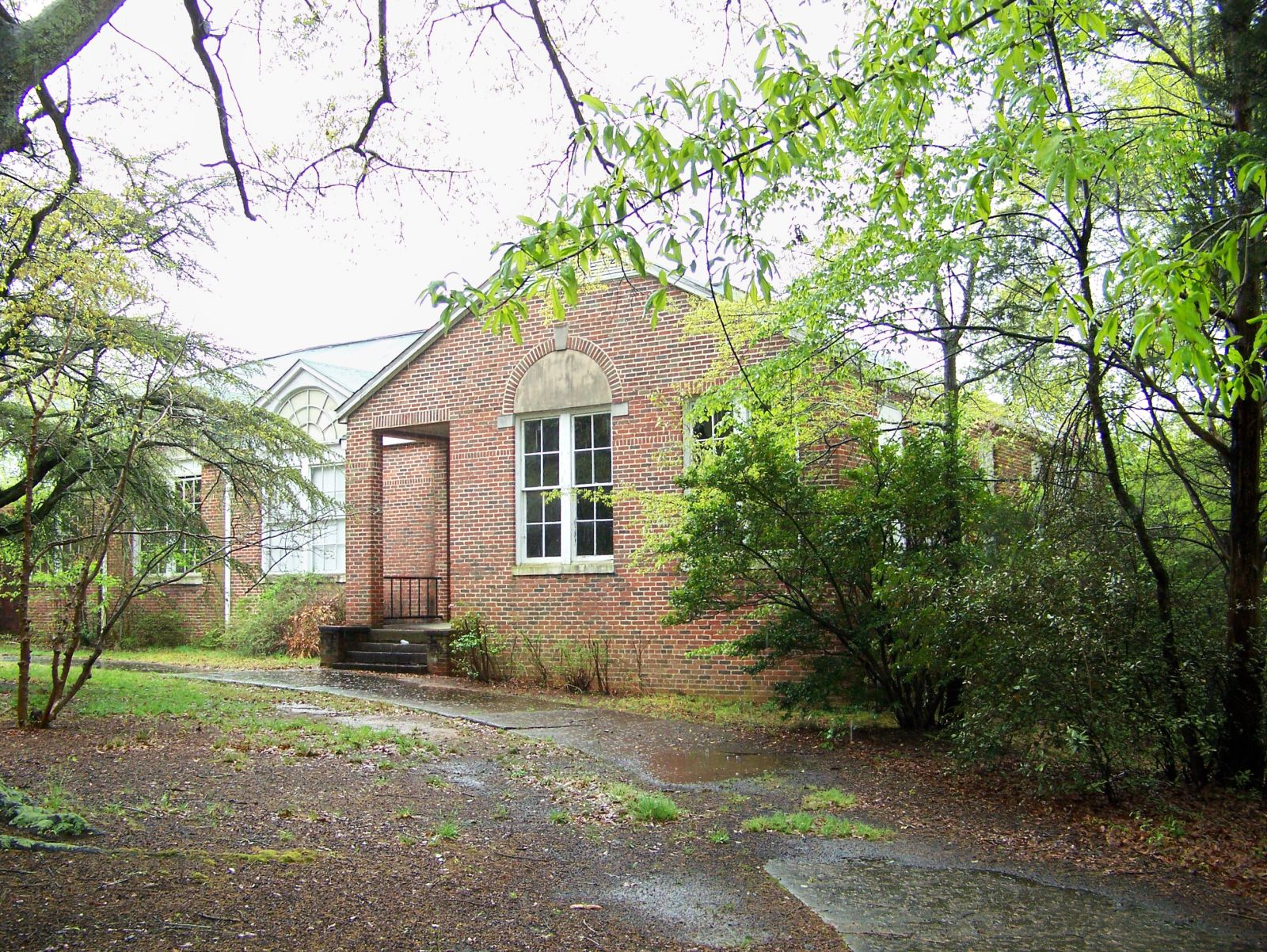
Old Graham Elementary School
