= George Sperling House and Outbuildings =

Historic house in North Carolina, United States

- U.S. National Register of Historic Places
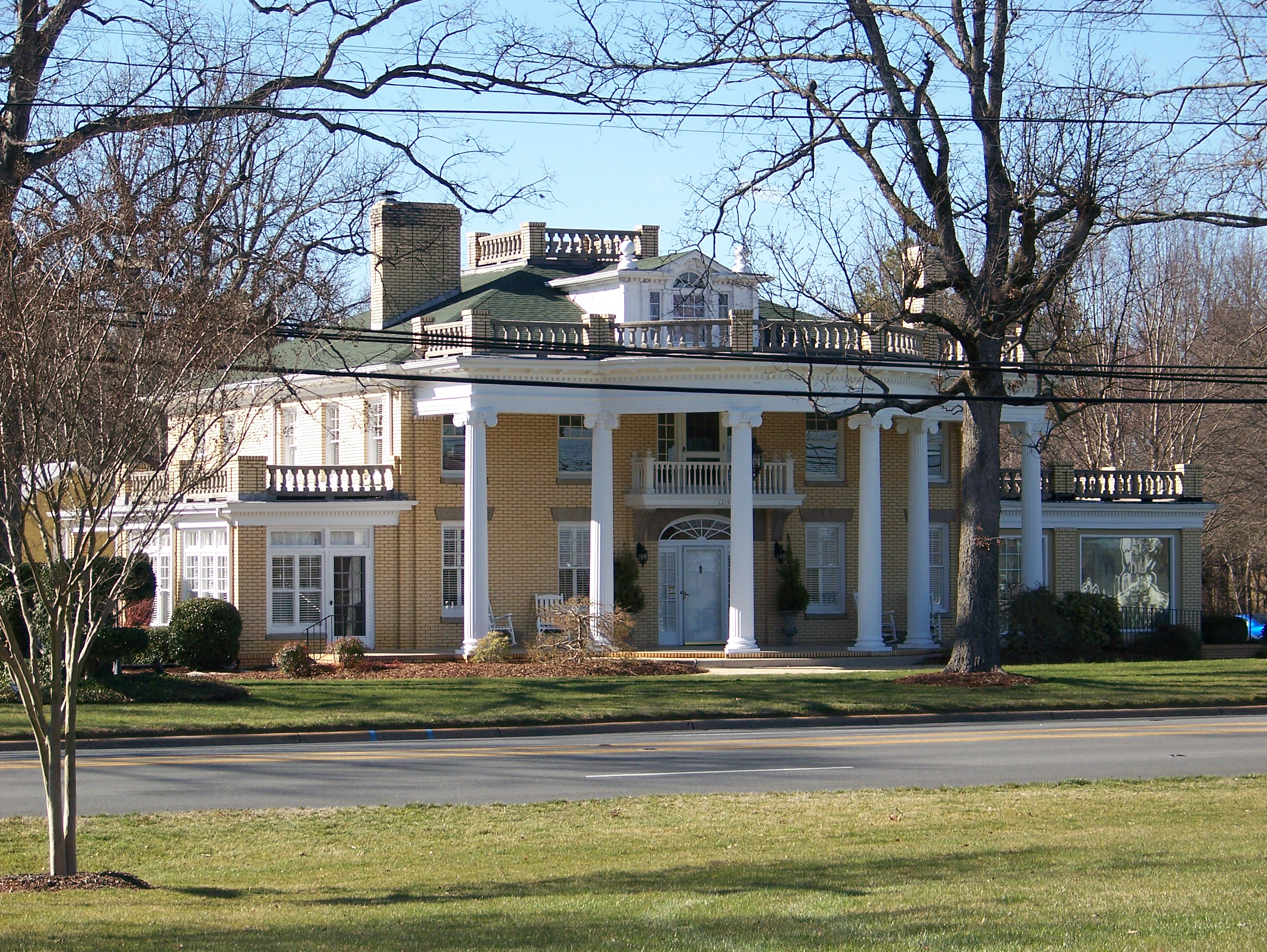

- Location within North Carolina Location within the United States
- Location: 1219 Fallston Rd., Shelby, North Carolina
- Coordinates: 35°18′53″N 81°31′22″W
- Area: 5 acres (2.0 ha)
- Built: 1909-1920, 1927
- Architect: Branton, Augustus
- Architectural style: Classical Revival
- NRHP reference No.: 01001425
- Added to NRHP: December 31, 2001

George Sperling House and Outbuildings is a historic home and farm located near Shelby, Cleveland County, North Carolina. The house was built in 1927, and is a two-story, Classical Revival style yellow brick dwelling. The contributing outbuildings were built between about 1909 and 1920 and include: a two-story, gambrel roof mule barn with German siding; corn crib; hog pen; wood house; two-story granary; smokehouse; generator house; and a tack house. Also on the property is the barn, built in 1927.

This historic site was renovated and is currently the offices for the legal team of Teddy, Meekins, & Talbert.

It was listed on the National Register of Historic Places in 2001.
