= Davidson Elementary School =

Historic school building in North Carolina

- U.S. National Register of Historic Places
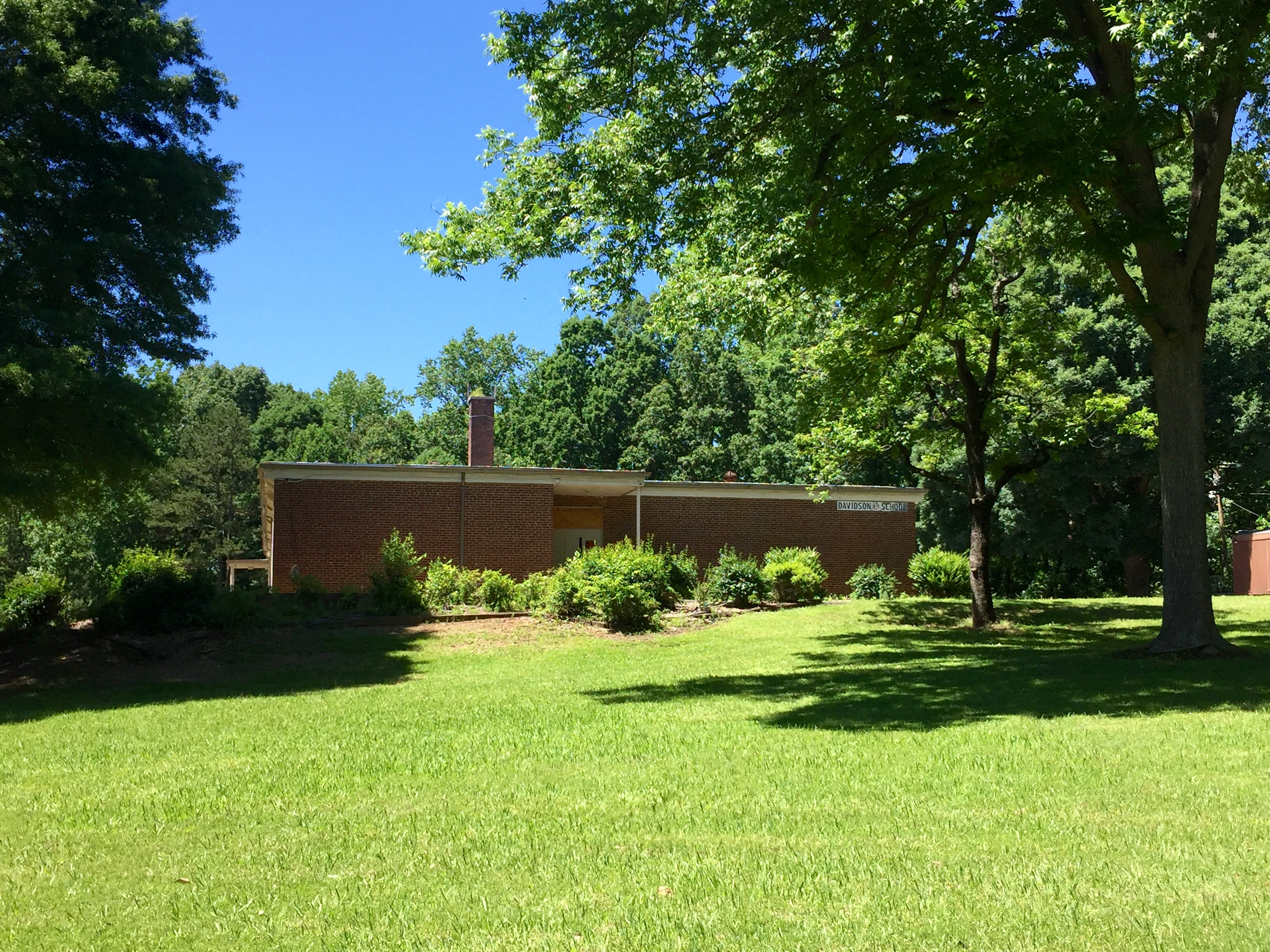
- The school in 2016
- Location: Kings Mountain, North Carolina
- Area: c. 4 acres (1.6 ha)
- Built: 1954
- Architect: James Lorn Beam Jr.
- Architectural style: Modern Movement
- NRHP reference No.: 16000287
- Added to NRHP: May 18, 2016

Davidson Elementary School is a historic school located in Kings Mountain, North Carolina. It is a well-preserved, one-story Modern Movement building used as a school for black students from 1954 to 1968.

== History ==
The flat-roof brick masonry school was constructed from 1953 to 1954. The school was named after Rev. Robert James Davidson, the former principal of Davidson High School. From 1954 to 1968, the school educated black students. It is the only school constructed in the 20th century for black public education in Kings Mountain still standing. From 1968 to 1968, the school housed special education classes and from 1969 to 1994, served as administrative offices. From 1995 to 2009, the building again served as a special education facility. In 2014, the building was leased to the Davidson Alumni Resource Center to be used as a community center.
