= Frank Rickert Summers House =

- U.S. National Register of Historic Places
- Location: Kings Mountain, North Carolina
- Built: 1928
- Architect: Hugh Edward White
- Architectural style: Tudor Revival
- NRHP reference No.: 100006458
- Added to NRHP: 5/26/2021

The Frank Rickert Summers House is a historic house located in Kings Mountain, North Carolina. The house is a two-story wood-frame building built in 1928 and recognized for its Tudor Revival style. It was listed in the National Register of Historic Places in 2021.
