= James Heyward Hull House =

Historic house in North Carolina, United States

- U.S. National Register of Historic Places
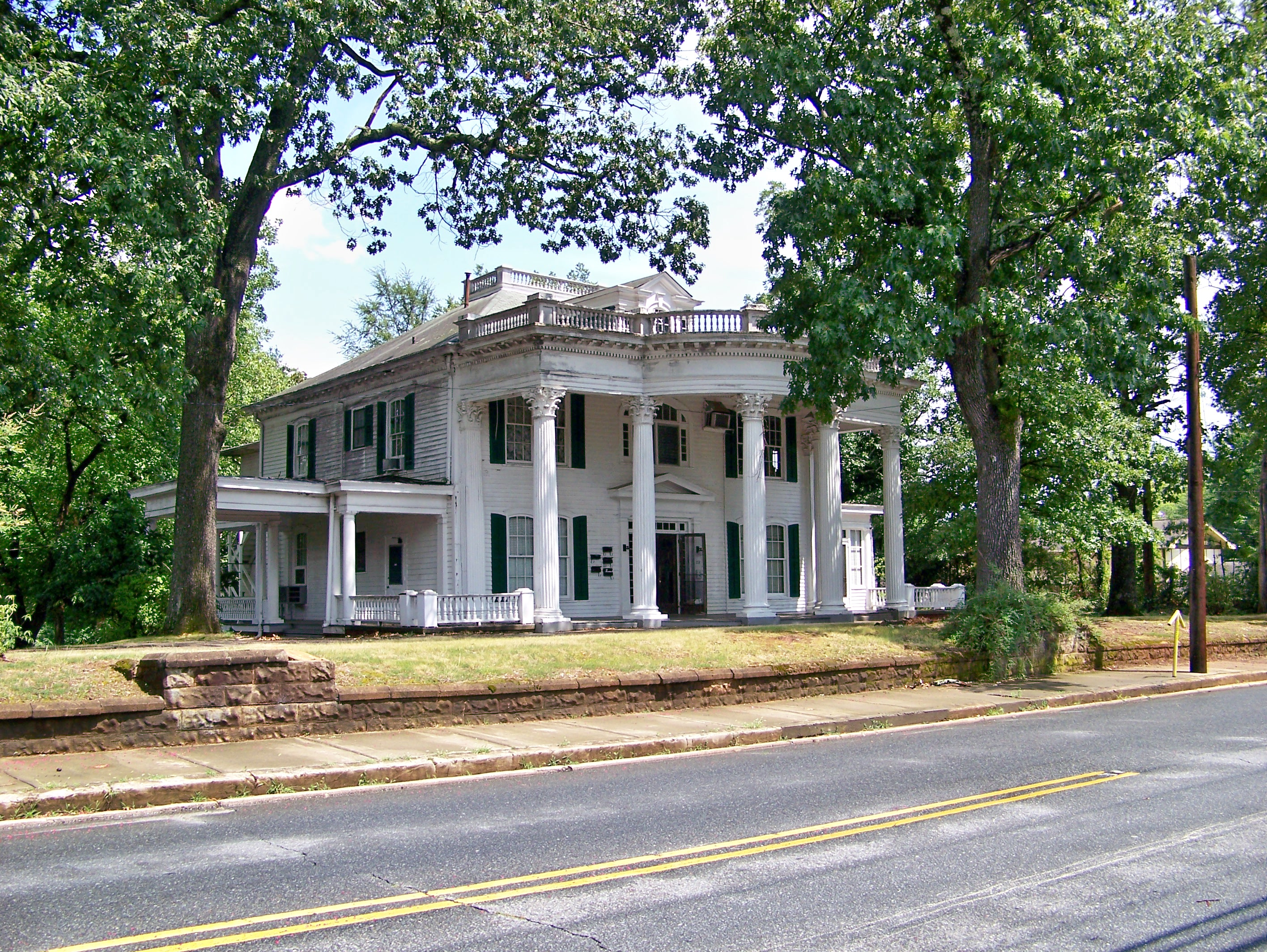

- Location within North Carolina Location within the United States
- Location: 710 N. Lafayette St., Shelby, North Carolina
- Coordinates: 35°18′1″N 81°32′22″W
- Area: 1.2 acres (0.49 ha)
- Built: 1874, 1907, 1940s
- Architectural style: Classical Revival
- NRHP reference No.: 03000338
- Added to NRHP: May 1, 2003

The James Heyward Hull House is a historic home located at Shelby, Cleveland County, North Carolina. It was built c. 1874 and extensively remodeled in 1907. The remodeling added the Classical Revival style semi-elliptical monumental portico with fluted Corinthian order columns and pilasters. It is a two-story, square-in-plan main block with a central hall, triple pile floor plan and a hip roof. A two-story rear wing was added in the 1940s.

It was listed on the National Register of Historic Places in 2003.
