= Joshua Beam House =

Historic house in North Carolina, United States

- U.S. National Register of Historic Places
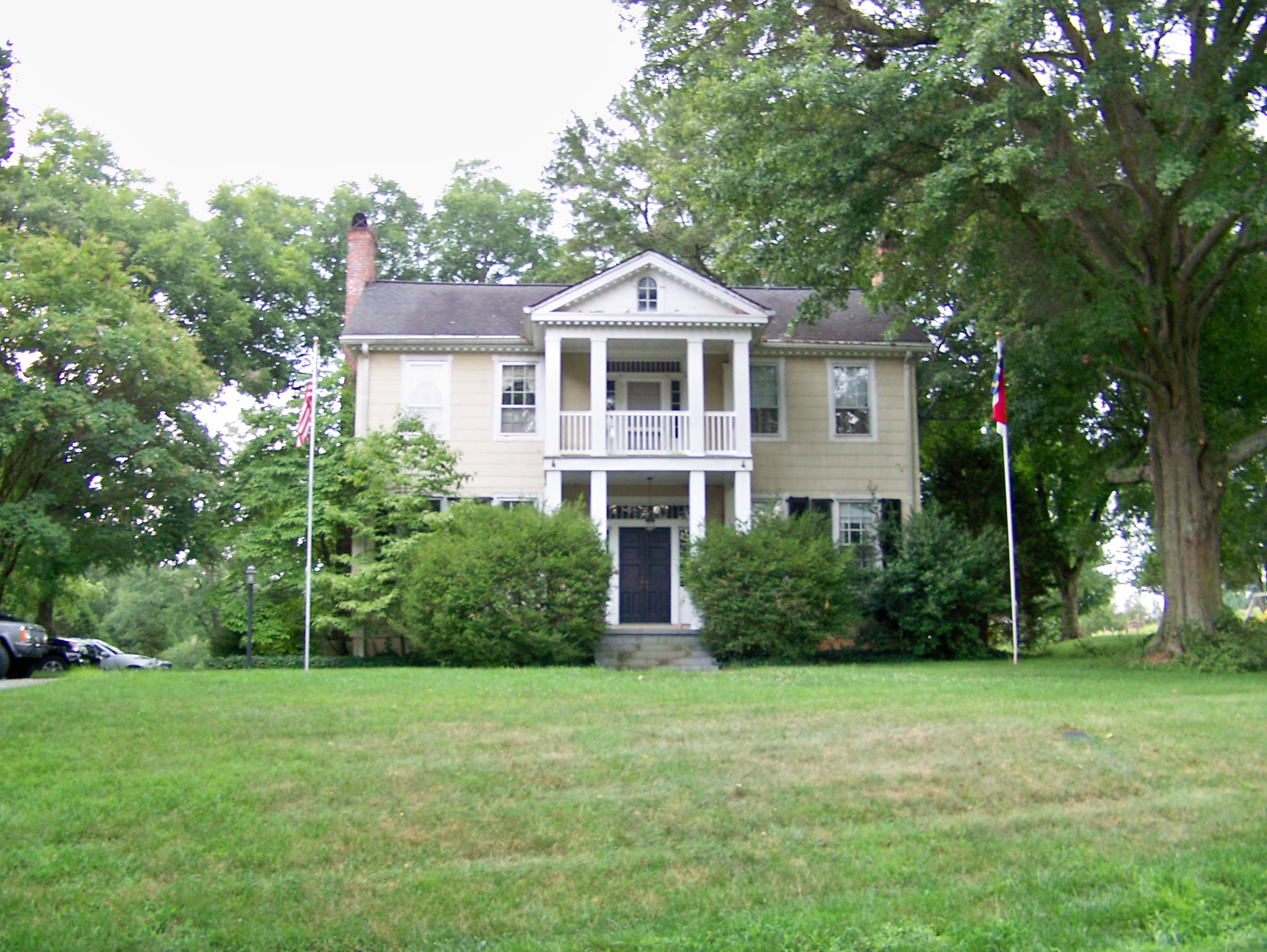

- Location within North Carolina Location within the United States
- Location: Northeast of Shelby, near Shelby, North Carolina
- Coordinates: 35°20′47″N 81°29′10″W
- Area: 30 acres (12 ha)
- Built: c. 1845
- Architectural style: Greek Revival
- NRHP reference No.: 80002813
- Added to NRHP: June 4, 1980

Joshua Beam House is a historic home located near Shelby, Cleveland County, North Carolina. It was built about 1845, and is a two-story, gable-roofed frame dwelling in the Greek Revival style. It has a one-story rear kitchen ell. The front facade features a two-story pedimented porch with an intervening second floor balcony.

It was listed on the National Register of Historic Places in 1980.
