= Shelby, North Carolina =

- City
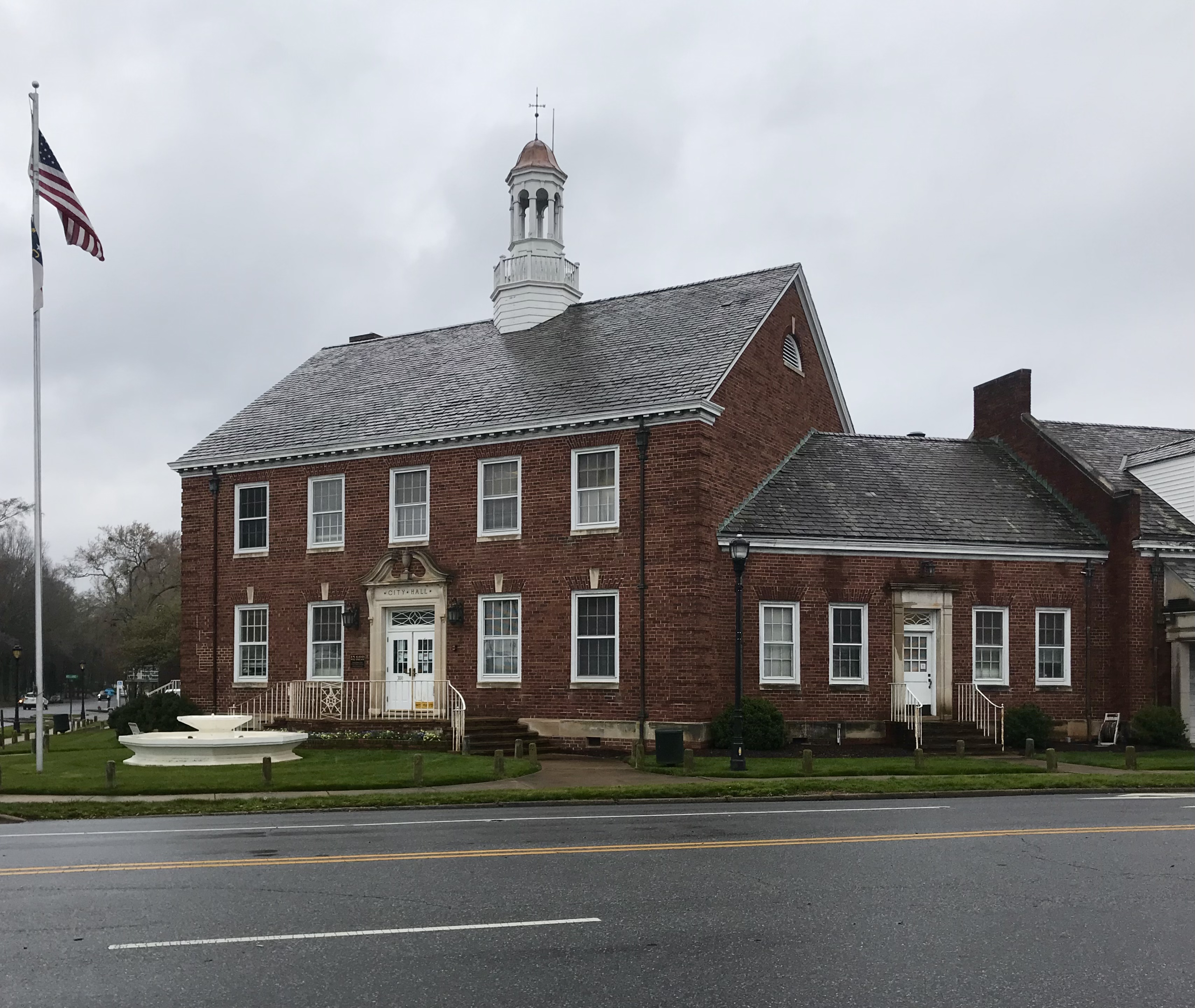
- City hall

- Seal

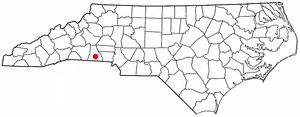
- Location of Shelby, North Carolina
- Coordinates: 35°17′25″N 81°32′43″W
- Country: United States
- State: North Carolina
- County: Cleveland
- Named for: Isaac Shelby

Area
  - Total: 22.39 sq mi (57.98 km^{2})
  - Land: 22.36 sq mi (57.90 km^{2})
  - Water: 0.035 sq mi (0.09 km^{2})
- Elevation: 873 ft (266 m)

Population (2020)
  - Total: 21,918
  - Estimate (2022): 21,855
  - Density: 980.5/sq mi (378.57/km^{2})
- Time zone: UTC−5 (Eastern (EST))
  - Summer (DST): UTC−4 (EDT)
- ZIP codes: 28150-28152
- Area code: 704, 980
- FIPS code: 37-61200
- GNIS feature ID: 2405454
- Website: cityofshelby.com

Shelby is a city in and the county seat of Cleveland County, North Carolina. It lies near the western edge of the Charlotte-Concord, NC-SC Combined Statistical Area. The population was 21,918 at the 2020 census.

== History ==
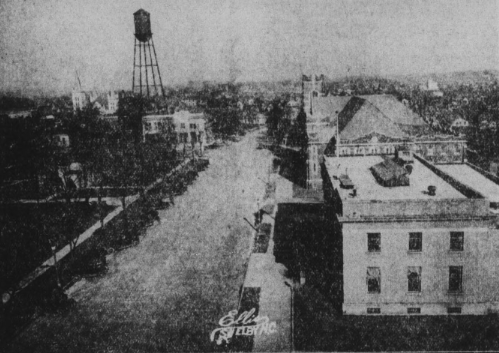
Shelby in 1925

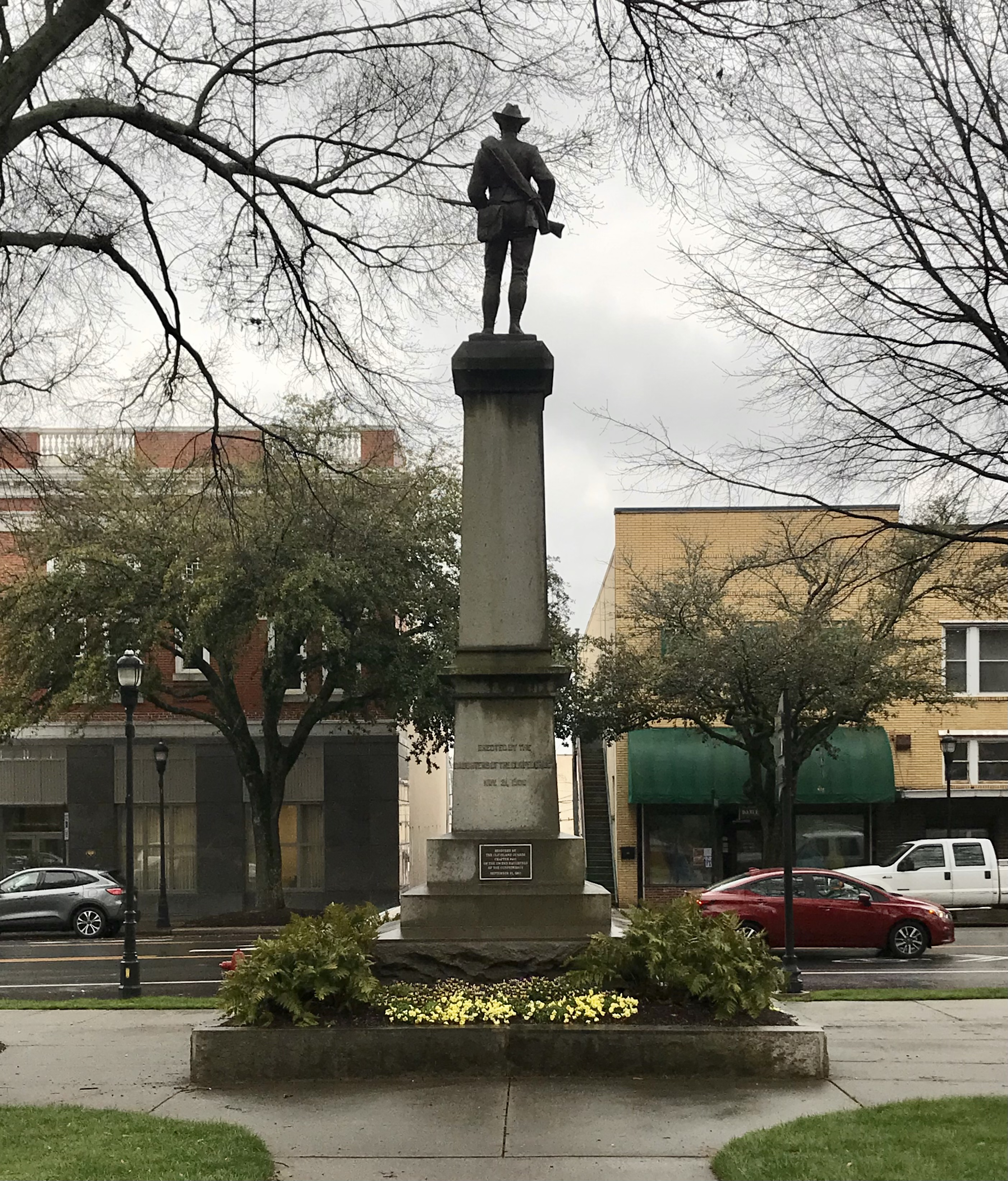
Confederate monument

The area was originally inhabited by Catawba and Cherokee peoples and was later settled around 1760. The city was chartered in 1843 and named after Colonel Isaac Shelby, a hero of the battle of Kings Mountain (1780) during the American Revolution. Shelby was agricultural until the railways in the 1870s stimulated Shelby's development.

In 1916, Thomas Dixon, Jr., the author of The Clansman: A Historical Romance of the Ku Klux Klan, planned to erect a statue of his uncle Leroy McAfee on the courthouse square. The project was initially met with enthusiasm, until it was announced that Dixon wanted the statue to be wearing a Ku Klux Klan mask. A Confederate monument is located on the west side of the courthouse square, while foreign war monuments stand on the north and south sides.

Nevertheless, the Ku Klux Klan did have a significant presence in Shelby in the 1870s and its crimes were the subject of depositions and affidavits collected by Captain Albion Howe (1841–1873) of the 4th Regiment Artillery.

Textiles later became its chief industry during the 1920s, when production of cotton in Cleveland County rose from 8,000 to 80,000 bales a year. Cotton production peaked in 1948 with Cleveland County producing 83,549 bales, making it North Carolina's premier cotton county. In the 1930s, Shelby was known as "The Leading Shopping Center between Charlotte and Asheville". People from surrounding counties came to Shelby to shop, since there were numerous types of local and chain stores. By 1947, Shelby was a true thriving town with the mills paying among the highest wages in the South. In the 1950s, droughts, insect infestations, and government acreage controls resulted in the decline of cotton as Cleveland County's primary crop.

Shelby was home to a group of political leaders in the first half of the 20th century, that have become known as the "Shelby Dynasty." These political leaders wielded power through the local, State and Federal governments. The most notable of Shelby's political leadership were brothers James L. Webb and Edwin Yates Webb and brothers-in-law O. Max Gardner and Clyde R. Hoey. As governors, NC representatives, and US congressman, the group impacted Shelby life and Shelby's reputation throughout the state.

Shelby has a number of historic homes and buildings. Some buildings are county landmarks, such as the Historic Campbell Building while others are listed on the National Register of Historic Places: Banker's House, Joshua Beam House, Central Shelby Historic District, Cleveland County Courthouse, East Marion-Belvedere Park Historic District, James Heyward Hull House, Masonic Temple Building, Dr. Victor McBrayer House, George Sperling House and Outbuildings, Joseph Suttle House, Webbley, and West Warren Street Historic District.

== Community ==
Shelby's community of art, music, and government all take place in Uptown Shelby historic district. Uptown Shelby is home to a large square, local businesses, and a variety of restaurants surrounding The Courthouse Square. Re-branded as "uptown" in the 70s to bring town-people back off the highway and away from the mall, this area has been named a "Main Street" by the National Trust for Historic Preservation.

The local pavilion hosts a twice-a-week Farmers Market on Wednesdays and Saturdays, as well as local concerts. Monthly summer festivals like Shelby Alive and Seventh Inning Stretch, hosted by the American Legion World Series, brings regional music acts to perform in the city. With a low cost of living and a vibrant small town environment, Uptown Shelby has experienced a 10% growth in street level occupancy from 78% to 88%. Uptown Shelby hosts opportunities for active living with groups that engage in cycling, running, CrossFit, and yoga. Multiple restaurants and other local businesses are attracting day trippers and shoppers from across the region. Part of the city brand, live music is a part of community with the Earl Scruggs Center and the Don Gibson Theatre.

Other public attractions include walking trails like the thread trail and the Broad River Trail as well as public events. Reoccurring events include the Fall Livermush festival, The Cleveland County fair which is the largest county agricultural fair in North Carolina, The 7th inning Stretch, The Art of Sound, Arts on the Square, and various fundraisers.

Shelby is known throughout the state for its collaborative methods between private, non-profit, and public sector organizations with groups like Leadership Cleveland County.

In 2011, Shelby was named the permanent home of the American Legion Baseball World Series after decades of rotating venues for the event.

== Geography ==
Shelby is located in south-central Cleveland County. U.S. Route 74, a four-lane highway, runs through the city south of the center, and leads east 21 miles (34 km) to Gastonia and west 27 miles (43 km) to Rutherfordton.

According to the United States Census Bureau, the city has a total area of 21.1 square miles (54.7 km^{2}), of which 21.1 square miles (54.6 km^{2}) is land and 0.04 square miles (0.1 km^{2}), or 0.17%, is water.

== Climate ==
According to the Köppen Climate Classification system, Shelby has a humid subtropical climate, abbreviated "Cfa" on climate maps. The hottest temperature recorded in Shelby was 107 °F (41.7 °C) on July 30, 1952, while the coldest temperature recorded was −11 °F (−23.9 °C) on January 31, 1966.

Climate data for Shelby, North Carolina, 1991–2020 normals, extremes 1893–present
Month	Jan	Feb	Mar	Apr	May	Jun	Jul	Aug	Sep	Oct	Nov	Dec	Year
Record high °F (°C)	81 (27)	82 (28)	91 (33)	93 (34)	100 (38)	105 (41)	107 (42)	105 (41)	104 (40)	98 (37)	87 (31)	80 (27)	107 (42)
Mean maximum °F (°C)	69.8 (21.0)	73.1 (22.8)	80.4 (26.9)	85.0 (29.4)	89.4 (31.9)	93.7 (34.3)	96.1 (35.6)	95.1 (35.1)	92.1 (33.4)	85.1 (29.5)	77.1 (25.1)	70.0 (21.1)	97.2 (36.2)
Mean daily maximum °F (°C)	52.6 (11.4)	56.5 (13.6)	64.1 (17.8)	73.1 (22.8)	80.1 (26.7)	87.1 (30.6)	90.6 (32.6)	88.9 (31.6)	83.3 (28.5)	73.9 (23.3)	63.6 (17.6)	55.1 (12.8)	72.4 (22.4)
Daily mean °F (°C)	39.8 (4.3)	43.0 (6.1)	50.1 (10.1)	58.8 (14.9)	67.1 (19.5)	74.6 (23.7)	78.3 (25.7)	76.8 (24.9)	70.7 (21.5)	59.5 (15.3)	49.1 (9.5)	42.2 (5.7)	59.2 (15.1)
Mean daily minimum °F (°C)	26.9 (−2.8)	29.5 (−1.4)	36.0 (2.2)	44.5 (6.9)	54.0 (12.2)	62.1 (16.7)	65.9 (18.8)	64.8 (18.2)	58.1 (14.5)	45.1 (7.3)	34.6 (1.4)	29.4 (−1.4)	45.9 (7.7)
Mean minimum °F (°C)	11.7 (−11.3)	16.4 (−8.7)	20.4 (−6.4)	30.1 (−1.1)	38.9 (3.8)	51.3 (10.7)	58.9 (14.9)	57.1 (13.9)	46.0 (7.8)	30.8 (−0.7)	21.5 (−5.8)	16.8 (−8.4)	9.7 (−12.4)
Record low °F (°C)	−11 (−24)	−9 (−23)	5 (−15)	20 (−7)	29 (−2)	37 (3)	51 (11)	48 (9)	36 (2)	19 (−7)	11 (−12)	−2 (−19)	−11 (−24)
Average precipitation inches (mm)	4.31 (109)	3.36 (85)	4.68 (119)	4.27 (108)	4.30 (109)	4.47 (114)	4.41 (112)	4.49 (114)	3.98 (101)	3.72 (94)	3.98 (101)	4.43 (113)	50.40 (1,280)
Average snowfall inches (cm)	1.8 (4.6)	0.6 (1.5)	0.7 (1.8)	0.0 (0.0)	0.0 (0.0)	0.0 (0.0)	0.0 (0.0)	0.0 (0.0)	0.0 (0.0)	0.0 (0.0)	0.1 (0.25)	0.8 (2.0)	4.0 (10)
Average precipitation days (≥ 0.01 in)	9.9	8.7	10.2	9.1	10.5	10.9	11.8	11.2	7.9	7.8	8.1	9.7	115.8
Average snowy days (≥ 0.1 in)	0.7	0.5	0.4	0.0	0.0	0.0	0.0	0.0	0.0	0.0	0.0	0.4	2.0
Source 1: NOAA
Source 2: National Weather Service

== Demographics ==
Historical population
Census	Pop.	Note	%±
1880	990		—
1890	1,394		40.8%
1900	1,874		34.4%
1910	3,127		66.9%
1920	3,609		15.4%
1930	10,789		198.9%
1940	14,037		30.1%
1950	15,508		10.5%
1960	17,698		14.1%
1970	16,328		−7.7%
1980	15,310		−6.2%
1990	14,669		−4.2%
2000	19,477		32.8%
2010	20,323		4.3%
2020	21,918		7.8%
2025 (est.)	23,309	▲	6.3%
U.S. Decennial Census

=== 2020 census ===
As of the 2020 census, there were 21,918 people, 9,177 households, and 4,887 families residing in the city.

The median age was 41.8 years. 22.7% of residents were under the age of 18 and 20.6% of residents were 65 years of age or older. For every 100 females there were 84.3 males, and for every 100 females age 18 and over there were 79.8 males age 18 and over.

96.6% of residents lived in urban areas, while 3.4% lived in rural areas.

There were 9,177 households in Shelby, of which 27.9% had children under the age of 18 living in them. Of all households, 34.2% were married-couple households, 18.4% were households with a male householder and no spouse or partner present, and 41.2% were households with a female householder and no spouse or partner present. About 35.5% of all households were made up of individuals and 16.5% had someone living alone who was 65 years of age or older.

There were 10,089 housing units, of which 9.0% were vacant. The homeowner vacancy rate was 1.9% and the rental vacancy rate was 5.7%.

Racial composition as of the 2020 census
Race	Number	Percent
White	11,399	52.0%
Black or African American	8,451	38.6%
American Indian and Alaska Native	78	0.4%
Asian	229	1.0%
Native Hawaiian and Other Pacific Islander	5	0.0%
Some other race	591	2.7%
Two or more races	1,165	5.3%
Hispanic or Latino (of any race)	1,122	5.1%

=== 2000 census ===
As of the 2000 United States census, there were 19,477 people, 7,927 households, and 5,144 families residing in the city. The population density was 1,073.8 inhabitants per square mile (414.6/km^{2}). There were 8,853 housing units at an average density of 488.1 per square mile (188.5/km^{2}). The racial makeup of the city was 56.88% White, 40.97% African American, 0.09% Native American, 0.56% Asian, 0.02% Pacific Islander, 0.72% from other races, and 0.76% from two or more races. Hispanic or Latino of any race were 1.56% of the population.

There were 7,927 households, out of which 27.7% had children under the age of 18 living with them, 41.3% were married couples living together, 20.0% had a female householder with no husband present, and 35.1% were non-families. 31.6% of all households were made up of individuals, and 15.1% had someone living alone who was 65 years of age or older. The average household size was 2.37 and the average family size was 2.97.

In the city, the population was spread out, with 25.0% under the age of 18, 7.6% from 18 to 24, 25.8% from 25 to 44, 21.8% from 45 to 64, and 19.7% who were 65 years of age or older. The median age was 39 years. For every 100 females, there were 83.2 males. For every 100 females age 18 and over, there were 75.8 males.

The median income for a household in the city was $29,345, and the median income for a family was $38,603. Males had a median income of $30,038 versus $21,362 for females. The per capita income for the city was $18,708. About 14.3% of families and 17.8% of the population were below the poverty line, including 26.7% of those under age 18 and 13.7% of those age 65 or over.

== Transportation ==
=== Highways ===
Shelby is served by US Highway 74 and its business route. US 74 Business travels through uptown Shelby along Marion St. and Warren St., giving travelers access to Shelby's growing central business district. Currently, a controlled-access highway (signed as US 74) is under construction from Mooresboro to Kings Mountain, which will bypass Shelby to the north. Upon completion of the project, Charlotte and Asheville will be connected by virtually uninterrupted freeway via Interstate 85, US Highway 74, and Interstate 26.

Shelby is also served by four North Carolina State Highways.

- North Carolina Highway 18
- North Carolina Highway 150
- North Carolina Highway 180
- North Carolina Highway 226

=== Airports ===
Shelby-Cleveland County Regional Airport serves the city and county. The airport is used mostly for general aviation and is owned by the city of Shelby. Commercial air service is provided within a 2-hour drive at Charlotte (CLT), Asheville (AVL), Concord (JQF) and Greenville/Spartanburg (GSP).

== Education ==
Cleveland County Schools is the school district for all of Cleveland County, including Shelby.

Prior to January 2004, the city was in Shelby City Schools, a separate school district.

Secondary and intermediate schools include:

- Shelby High School
- Shelby Middle School

Elementary schools include:

- Elizabeth Elementary School
- Jefferson Elementary School
- James Love Elementary School

Springmore, Township Three, and Union elementary schools have Shelby postal addresses but are outside of the Shelby corporate limits.

Graham and Marion elementary schools closed in 2022, and the former Shelby Intermediate School was to be converted into an elementary school including the former Graham and Marion zones; in other words, it became Elizabeth Elementary School. The building had been Elizabeth Elementary prior to being converted into an intermediate school. The conversion returned it to its former name.

== In popular culture ==
The 2004 film adaptation of Blood Done Sign My Name was filmed in Shelby – as well as the reaping scene in the 2012 film adaptation of The Hunger Games, and the 1982 slasher film Death Screams.

A fictionalized version of the city is the setting of HBO comedy show Eastbound & Down. Filmed in Wilmington, North Carolina, it bears little geographic or cultural resemblance to the real place. Actor and writer Danny McBride chose the location as an inspiration because of its size, attitude, and name.

The TV show Bizarre Foods with Andrew Zimmern visited the 2009 Livermush festival in Shelby.

On November 11, 2007, the Oxygen Network's "Captured" aired a profile of The Brenda Sue Brown murder mystery that took place in Shelby in 1966.

== Notable people ==
- Jo Adell, outfielder for the Los Angeles Angels
- Bobby Bell, former NFL linebacker for the Kansas City Chiefs, member of the Pro Football Hall of Fame
- Alicia Bridges, disco singer
- Jonathan Bullard, NFL defensive end
- Bill Champion, MLB player
- Morris Davis, colonel in U.S. Air Force
- Asha Degree, child reported missing in 2000
- Thomas Dixon Jr., minister, author, white supremacist
- Eddie Dodson, bank robber
- Robert Lee Durham, educator and lawyer
- Manny Fernandez, "The Raging Bull", professional wrestler
- David Flair, professional wrestler
- Charlotte Flair, professional wrestler
- Margaret Gardner Hoey, First Lady of North Carolina
- Oliver Max Gardner, 57th governor of North Carolina
- Alvin Gentry, head coach of the Sacramento Kings of the NBA
- Don Gibson, singer and songwriter; member of the Country Music Hall of Fame
- Kay Hagan, former U.S. senator for North Carolina
- Charlie Harbison, University of Missouri defensive backs coach
- Tre Harbison, NFL running back
- Robert Harrill, the Fort Fisher Hermit
- Keith E. Haynes, Maryland politician, lawyer
- Norris Hopper, MLB player
- Hatcher Hughes, Pulitzer Prize-winning playwright
- Charlie Justice, NFL player, two-time Heisman Trophy runner-up
- Doug Limerick, ABC radio newscaster
- Patty Loveless, country music singer
- Manteo Mitchell, 2012 Olympics silver medalist in the men's 4x400 metre relay
- Scottie Montgomery, NFL wide receiver, Oakland Raiders, Arena Football League player, head coach at East Carolina University
- Kevin Nanney, former professional Super Smash Bros. Melee player
- Dawson Odums, Southern University football head coach
- Travis Padgett, 2008 Olympics athlete in the men's 4x100 metre relay
- Floyd Patterson, heavyweight boxing champion, Boxing Hall of Famer
- Mel Phillips, former NFL safety, former NFL coach
- Stephanie Pogue, artist and art educator
- Nina Repeta, actress known for her role on Dawson's Creek
- Price D. Rice, U.S. Army Air Corps/U.S. Air Force colonel and member of the Tuskegee Airmen
- Earl Scruggs, banjo player and composer on Hollywood Walk of Fame
- Isaac Shelby, soldier and Governor of Kentucky, for whom the city of Shelby is named
- Charlotte Smith, WNBA basketball player
- Brandon Spikes, linebacker for the New England Patriots
- Billy Standridge, NASCAR driver
- David Thompson, ABA and NBA guard, Basketball Hall of Famer
- Cliff Washburn, NFL offensive tackle, Houston Texans
- Jim Washburn, NFL defensive line coach
- Edwin Y. Webb, politician and judge
- James L. Webb, politician and judge
- Fay Webb-Gardner, First Lady of North Carolina
- Tim Wilkison, former professional tennis player
- Robert Williams, former NFL cornerback
- Tom Wright, MLB player
