= List of bridges on the National Register of Historic Places in North Carolina =

The following bridges and tunnels in North Carolina are on the National Register of Historic Places.

Name	Image	Built	Listed	Location	County	Type
Bunker Hill Covered Bridge	Bunk Hill Covered Bridge	1895	1970-02-26	Claremont; 35°43′20″N 81°6′36″W	Catawba	Haupt truss
Bynum Bridge		1922	2020-04-23	Bynum; 35°46′18.1″N 79°08′42.0″W	Chatham	Concrete tee beam
Deep River Camelback Truss Bridge	Deep River Camelback Bridge	1910, 1932	1995-06-09	Cumnock-Gulf; 35°34′13″N 79°14′28″W	Chatham	Camelback Truss
Hunting Creek Railroad Bridge	Hunting Creek Railroad Bridge	ca. 1860, ca. 1890	1987-11-09	Morganton; 35°45′5″N 81°39′31″W	Burke	Stone Arch Masonry
King Street Overhead Bridge	King Street Overhead Bridge	1938, 1939	2005-04-06	Kings Mountain; 35°14′27″N 81°20′41″W	Cleveland	Rigid-frame bridge
Pisgah Community Covered Bridge		ca. 1910	1972-01-20	Pisgah; 35°32′32″N 79°53′38″W	Randolph	Modified queenpost truss
Scuppernong River Bridge	Scuppernong River Bridge	1926, 1927	1992-03-05	Columbia; 35°55′2″N 76°15′19″W	Tyrrell	Warren ponytruss swing span
Skeen's Mill Covered Bridge	Skeen's Mill Covered Bridge	1885–1900	1972-01-20	Flint Hill	Randolph	Town lattice-truss/queenpost
Southern Railway Company Overhead Bridge	Southern Railway Overhead Bridge	1919	2007-04-19	Kings Mountain; 35°14′29″N 81°20′41″W	Cleveland	T-beam
West Fork Pigeon River Pratt Truss Bridge		1891	2019-01-10	Bethel; 35°27′49.0″N 82°54′00.0″W	Haywood	Pratt through truss
