= North Carolina's 111th House district =

American legislative district

North Carolina's 111th State House of Representatives district
Representative
Paul Scott; R–Ellenboro
- Demographics: 76% White; 12% Black; 5% Hispanic; 1% Asian; 5% Multiracial
- Population (2024): 86,453

North Carolina's 111th House district is one of 120 districts in the North Carolina House of Representatives. It has been represented by Republican Paul Scott since 2025.

== Geography ==
Since 2023, the district has included part of Cleveland and Rutherford counties. The district overlaps with the 44th and 48th Senate districts.

== District officeholders since 2003 ==
Representative	Party	Dates	Notes	Counties
District created January 1, 2003.				2003–2023; Part of Cleveland County.
Tim Moore (Kings Mountain)	Republican	January 1, 2003 – January 1, 2025	Retired to run for Congress.	2003–2023; Part of Cleveland County.
Tim Moore (Kings Mountain)	Republican	January 1, 2003 – January 1, 2025	Retired to run for Congress.	2023–Present; Parts of Cleveland and Rutherford counties.
Paul Scott (Ellenboro)	Republican	January 1, 2025 – Present		2023–Present; Parts of Cleveland and Rutherford counties.

== Election results ==
=== 2024 ===
North Carolina House of Representatives 111th district Republican primary election, 2024
Party	Candidate	Votes	%
Republican	Paul Scott	3,648	34.31%
Republican	David Allen	3,239	30.46%
Republican	Paul Brintley	1,985	18.67%
Republican	Scott Neisler	1,760	16.55%
Total votes		10,632	100%

North Carolina House of Representatives 111th district general election, 2024
Party	Candidate	Votes	%
Republican	Paul Scott	31,434	73.89%
Democratic	Frances Rollinson Webber	11,110	26.11%
Total votes		42,544	100%
Republican hold			

=== 2022 ===
North Carolina House of Representatives 110th district general election, 2022
Party	Candidate	Votes	%
Republican	Tim Moore (incumbent)	23,333	100%
Total votes		23,333	100%
Republican hold			

=== 2020 ===
North Carolina House of Representatives 110th district general election, 2020
Party	Candidate	Votes	%
Republican	Tim Moore (incumbent)	24,491	63.52%
Democratic	Jennifer Childers	14,063	36.48%
Total votes		38,554	100%
Republican hold			

=== 2018 ===
North Carolina House of Representatives 110th district general election, 2018
Party	Candidate	Votes	%
Republican	Tim Moore (incumbent)	16,511	65.41%
Democratic	David C. Brinkley	8,733	34.59%
Total votes		25,244	100%
Republican hold			

=== 2016 ===
North Carolina House of Representatives 110th district general election, 2016
Party	Candidate	Votes	%
Republican	Tim Moore (incumbent)	25,398	100%
Total votes		25,398	100%
Republican hold			

=== 2014 ===
North Carolina House of Representatives 110th district general election, 2014
Party	Candidate	Votes	%
Republican	Tim Moore (incumbent)	15,338	100%
Total votes		15,338	100%
Republican hold			

=== 2012 ===
North Carolina House of Representatives 110th district general election, 2012
Party	Candidate	Votes	%
Republican	Tim Moore (incumbent)	22,441	100%
Total votes		22,441	100%
Republican hold			

=== 2010 ===
North Carolina House of Representatives 111th district general election, 2010
Party	Candidate	Votes	%
Republican	Tim Moore (incumbent)	11,972	65.12%
Democratic	Mary S. Accor	6,413	34.88%
Total votes		18,385	100%
Republican hold			

=== 2008 ===
North Carolina House of Representatives 111th district general election, 2008
Party	Candidate	Votes	%
Republican	Tim Moore (incumbent)	20,077	100%
Total votes		20,077	100%
Republican hold			

=== 2006 ===
North Carolina House of Representatives 111th district general election, 2006
Party	Candidate	Votes	%
Republican	Tim Moore (incumbent)	9,841	60.72%
Democratic	Betsy H. Fonvielle	6,367	39.28%
Total votes		16,208	100%
Republican hold			

=== 2004 ===
North Carolina House of Representatives 111th district general election, 2004
Party	Candidate	Votes	%
Republican	Tim Moore (incumbent)	14,392	55.45%
Democratic	Kathryn H. Hamrick	11,565	44.55%
Total votes		25,957	100%
Republican hold			

=== 2002 ===
North Carolina House of Representatives 111th district general election, 2002
Party	Candidate	Votes	%
Republican	Tim Moore	9,790	52.97%
Democratic	Andy Dedmon (incumbent)	8,693	47.03%
Total votes		18,483	100%
Republican gain from Democratic			
