= 1991 New England Patriots season =

Season of National Football League team the New England Patriots

- Owner: Victor Kiam
- General manager: Sam Jankovich
- Head coach: Dick MacPherson
- Home stadium: Foxboro Stadium

Results
- Record: 6–10
- Division place: 4th AFC East
- Playoffs: Did not qualify
- All-Pros: TE Marv Cook (1st team); LB Vincent Brown (2nd team)
- Pro Bowlers: T Bruce Armstrong; TE Marv Cook

Uniform

The 1991 New England Patriots season was the team's 32nd season, and the 22nd in the National Football League. The team finished the season with a record of six wins and ten losses, and finished fourth in the AFC East Division. Though the Patriots scored twenty or more points just five times during the season, they were able to upset playoff teams such as the Houston Oilers, Buffalo Bills and New York Jets.

It was the last season where the Patriots were owned by Victor Kiam, who was forced to sell the team to St. Louis businessman James Orthwein in order to settle a debt.

After the season, George Adams and Marvin Allen decided they had played their final NFL games.

== Offseason ==
=== NFL draft ===
Round	Pick	Player	Position	School/Club team
1	11	Pat Harlow	Offensive tackle	Southern California
1	14	Leonard Russell	Running back	Arizona State
2	41	Jerome Henderson	Defensive back	Clemson
3	56	Calvin Stephens	Guard	South Carolina
4	84	Scott Zolak	Quarterback	Maryland
5	112	Jon Vaughn	Running back	Michigan
5	124	Ben Coates	Tight end	Livingstone
6	140	David Key	Defensive back	Michigan
7	168	Blake Miller	Center	Louisiana State
8	196	Harry Colon	Defensive back	Missouri
9	224	O'Neil Glenn	Guard	Maryland
10	251	Randy Bethel	Tight end	Miami (FL)
11	279	Vince Moore	Wide receiver	Tennessee
11	303	Paul Alsbury	Punter	Texas State
12	307	Tim Edwards	Defensive tackle	Delta State

== Staff ==
1991 New England Patriots staff
Front office: Chairman – Victor Kiam; Vice chairman – Fran Murray; President – Billy Sullivan; Chief executive officer – Sam Jankovich; Vice-president – Bucko Kilroy; Vice-president of player operations – Joe Mendes; Vice-president of administration – Patrick Forte; Assistant director of player operations – Charley Armey; Coordinator of pro scouting – Rod Rust; Coordinator of college scouting – Charles Garcia; Head coaches: Head coach – Dick MacPherson; Offensive coaches: Offensive coordinator – Dick Coury; Running backs – Bobby Grier; Assistant running backs/assistant wide receivers – Joel Collier; Wide receivers – Ivan Fears; Offensive line – Rod Humenuik	Defensive coaches: Defensive coordinator – Joe Collier; Defensive line – Stan Jones; Assistant defensive line/assistant special teams – Dave Uyrus; Inside linebackers – Norm Gerber; Outside linebackers – Myrel Moore; Defensive backs – Charlie West; Special teams coaches: Special teams/tight ends – Dante Scarnecchia; Strength and conditioning: Strength and conditioning – Ian Pyka

== Roster ==
1991 New England Patriots roster
Quarterbacks (QB): 13 Tommy Hodson; 7 Hugh Millen; 16 Scott Zolak; Running backs (RB): 39 Marvin Allen; 32 Leonard Russell; 44 John Stephens; 24 Jon Vaughn KR; Wide receivers (WR): 81 Rob Carpenter; 80 Irving Fryar; 82 Millard Hamilton; 83 Michael Timpson; Tight ends (TE): 87 Ben Coates; 85 Marv Cook	Offensive linemen (OL): 78 Bruce Armstrong T; 61 Freddie Childress G; 63 Gene Chilton C; 74 Stan Clayton T; 65 Elbert Crawford G; 77 Pat Harlow T; 64 Jon Melander G; Defensive linemen (DL): 92 Ray Agnew DE; 91 Chris Gannon DE; 72 Tim Goad NT; 60 Marion Hobby DE; 76 Fred Smerlas NT; 60 Garin Veris DE; 96 Brent Williams DE	Linebackers (LB): 59 Vincent Brown ILB; 99 David Howard OLB; 51 Eugene Lockhart ILB; 52 Johnny Rembert ILB; 95 Ed Reynolds ILB; 55 Chris Singleton OLB; 53 Richard Tardits OLB; 56 Andre Tippett OLB; Defensive backs (DB): 40 Harry Colon SS; 41 Tim Gordon S; 36 Jerome Henderson CB/PR; 35 Maurice Hurst CB; 26 David Key SS; 42 Ronnie Lippett CB; 31 Fred Marion FS; 27 David Pool CB; 21 Mickey Washington CB; 25 Tony Zackery FS; Special teams (ST): 8 Charlie Baumann K; 11 Shawn McCarthy P	Practice squad: 19 James Bradley WR; 93 Reggie Clark LB; 98 Tim Edwards DT; 62 Blake Miller C; Reserve: 88 Hart Lee Dykes WR (IR); 45 Ivy Joe Hunter FB (IR); 50 Ilia Jarostchuk LB (IR); 86 Greg McMurtry WR (IR); 10 Mike Murphy WR (IR); 71 Gregg Rakoczy C (IR); 4 Jason Staurovsky K (IR); 68 Calvin Stephens G (IR); 70 David Viaene (IR); 73 Danny Villa (IR); 47 active, 10 inactive, 4 practice squad Rookies in italics

== Preseason ==
Week	Date	Opponent	Result	Record	Venue	Attendance
1	August 3	at Green Bay Packers	L 7–28	0–1	Lambeau Field	52,852
2	August 10	Washington Redskins	L 6–27	0–2	Foxboro Stadium	16,757
3	August 17	at Phoenix Cardinals	L 0–46	0–3	Sun Devil Stadium	51,070
4	August 24	New York Giants	W 24–3	1–3	Foxboro Stadium	21,147

== Regular season ==
=== Schedule ===
Week	Date	Opponent	Result	Record	Venue	Attendance
1	September 1	at **Indianapolis Colts**	**W** 16–7	1–0	Hoosier Dome	49,961
2	September 8	Cleveland Browns	**L** 0–20	1–1	Foxboro Stadium	35,377
3	September 15	at Pittsburgh Steelers	**L** 6–20	1–2	Three Rivers Stadium	53,703
4	September 22	Houston Oilers	**W** 24–20	2–2	Foxboro Stadium	30,702
5	September 29	at Phoenix Cardinals	**L** 10–24	2–3	Sun Devil Stadium	26,043
6	October 6	**Miami Dolphins**	**L** 10–20	2–4	Foxboro Stadium	49,749
7	Bye					
8	October 20	Minnesota Vikings	**W** 26–23 (OT)	3–4	Foxboro Stadium	45,367
9	October 27	Denver Broncos	**L** 6–9	3–5	Foxboro Stadium	43,994
10	November 3	at **Buffalo Bills**	**L** 17–22	3–6	Rich Stadium	78,278
11	November 10	at **Miami Dolphins**	**L** 20–30	3–7	Joe Robbie Stadium	56,065
12	November 17	**New York Jets**	**L** 21–28	3–8	Foxboro Stadium	30,743
13	November 24	**Buffalo Bills**	**W** 16–13	4–8	Foxboro Stadium	47,053
14	December 1	at Denver Broncos	**L** 3–20	4–9	Mile High Stadium	67,116
15	December 8	**Indianapolis Colts**	**W** 23–17 (OT)	5–9	Foxboro Stadium	20,131
16	December 15	at **New York Jets**	**W** 6–3	6–9	Giants Stadium	55,689
17	December 22	at Cincinnati Bengals	**L** 7–29	6–10	Riverfront Stadium	46,394
Note: Intra-division opponents are in **bold** text.

=== Standings ===
AFC East
	W	L	T	PCT	DIV	CONF	PF	PA	STK
^{(1)} Buffalo Bills	13	3	0	.813	7–1	10–2	458	318	L1
^{(6)} New York Jets	8	8	0	.500	4–4	6–6	314	293	W1
Miami Dolphins	8	8	0	.500	4–4	5–7	343	349	L2
New England Patriots	6	10	0	.375	4–4	5–9	211	305	L1
Indianapolis Colts	1	15	0	.063	1–7	1–11	143	381	L6

== See also ==
- New England Patriots seasons
