= David Key =

David Key may refer to:

- David M. Key (1824–1900), U.S. Senator from Tennessee, U.S. Postmaster General and judge
- David McK. Key (1900–1988), American diplomat
- David Key (American football) (born 1968), American football player
