= Paul Scott (North Carolina politician) =

American politician

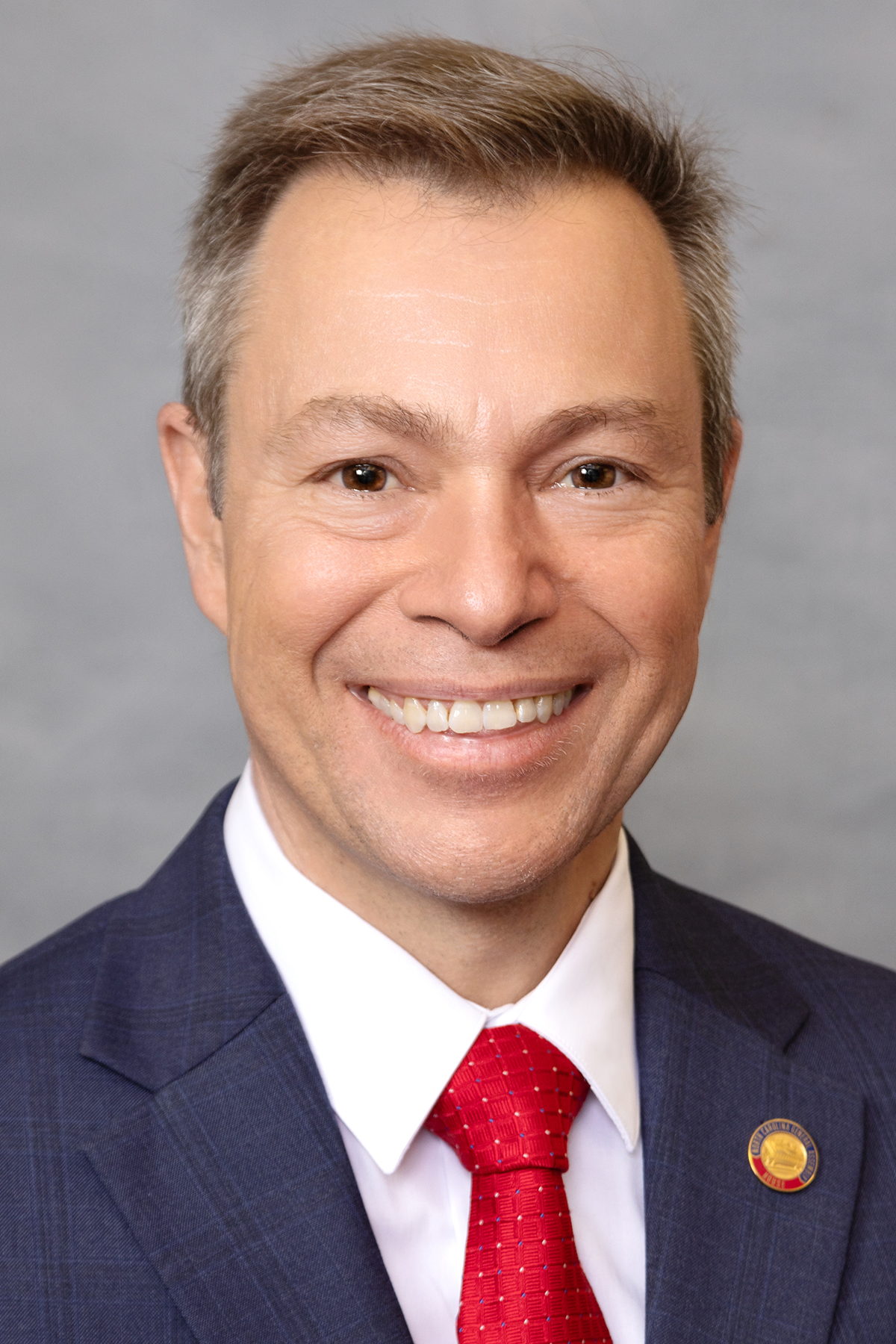

Member of the North Carolina House of Representatives from the 111th district
- Incumbent
- Assumed office January 1, 2025
- Preceded by: Tim Moore

Member of the Rutherford County Board of Education from the 2nd district
- In office December 6, 2022 – November 14, 2024
- Preceded by: Brandon Gosey
- Succeeded by: David Linder

Personal details
- Born: February 24, 1973 (age 53) Hillsborough County, Florida
- Party: Republican
- Spouse: Kelly Conkling
- Children: 4
- Education: Heriot-Watt University (MBA)
- Website: Official website Campaign website

Paul Lynwood Scott is a Republican member of the North Carolina House of Representatives who has represented the 111th district (covering parts of Cleveland and Rutherford counties) since 2025. He was first elected to the seat in 2024. A pastor from Ellenboro, North Carolina, he previously served on the Rutherford County Board of Education from 2022 to 2024.

== Early life and education ==
Scott was born and raised in a small rural town in Hillsborough County, Florida, where he spent his youth involved in family, church, and school activities. He was ordained by his home church, the First Baptist Church of Riverview, Florida. Scott earned a Master of Business Administration (MBA) from Heriot-Watt University in Edinburgh, Scotland.

== Professional career ==
Scott has served as the Senior Pastor of Big Springs Baptist Church for over fifteen years.

Prior to his political career, Scott worked as a client technologies architect at the Duke University Health System.

== Civic service ==
Scott is a volunteer firefighter with the Polkville Volunteer Fire Department, a role he has held for more than a decade. He also serves as a chaplain and hostage/crisis negotiator with the Rutherford County Sheriff’s Office, holding advanced negotiation certification and participating in the Crisis Negotiation Team.

== Political career ==
In 2022, Scott ran for a seat on the Rutherford County Board of Education representing the East Rutherford district. He ran unopposed in the primary and defeated Unaffiliated candidate Parker Tate in the general election.

In 2024, Scott ran for the North Carolina House of Representatives to represent the newly open 111th district, following the retirement of longtime incumbent Tim Moore. He won the four-way Republican primary and went on to defeat his Democratic opponent in the November general election.

Scott assumed office on January 1, 2025. In the legislature, Scott’s stated priorities include support for constitutional rights, strengthening education, confronting drug addiction in communities, and prioritizing law-abiding citizens.

== Personal life ==
Scott is married to Kelly (née Conkling), whom he met while serving his first pastorate in Morrisville, North Carolina. They have four children: triplet sons and a daughter.

== Electoral History ==
=== 2024 ===
North Carolina House of Representatives 111th district general election, 2024
Party	Candidate	Votes	%
Republican	Paul Scott	31,434	73.89%
Democratic	Frances Rollinson Webber	11,110	26.11%
Total votes		42,544	100%
Republican hold			

North Carolina House of Representatives 111th district primary election, 2024
Party	Candidate	Votes	%
Republican	Paul Scott	3,648	34.31%
Republican	David Allen	3,239	30.46%
Republican	Paul Brintley	1,985	18.67%
Republican	Scott Neisler	1,760	16.55%
Total votes		10,632	100%

=== 2022 ===
Rutherford County Board of Education 2nd district general election, 2022
Party	Candidate	Votes	%
Republican	Paul Scott	15,559	70.50%
Unaffiliated	Parker Tate	6,509	29.50%
Total votes		22,068	100%

== Committee assignments ==
=== 2025-2026 session ===
Standing and Select Committees:

- Alcohol Beverage Control
- Federal Relations and American Indian Affairs
- Finance
- Health
- Blockchain and Digital Assets
- Helene Recovery
