= Sandor Teszler =

Hungarian-American textile executive and philanthropist

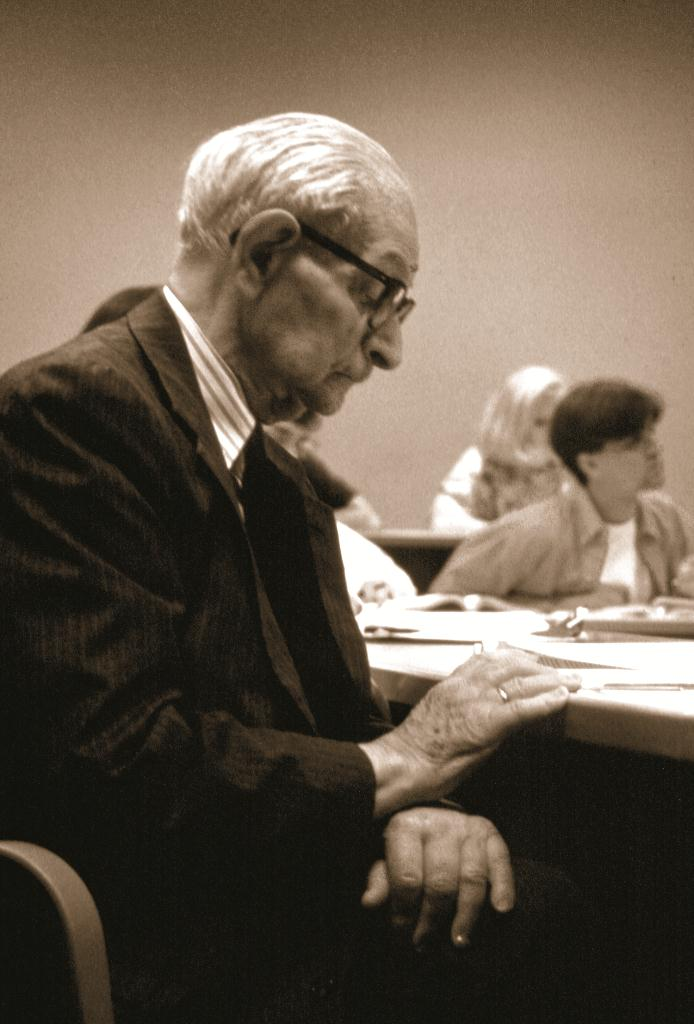
- Teszler at Wofford College, 1992
- Born: June 25, 1903; Budapest, Austria-Hungary
- Died: July 23, 2000 (aged 97); Spartanburg, South Carolina, U.S.
- Occupations: Textile executive and philanthropist

Sandor Teszler (June 25, 1903 – July 23, 2000), was a Hungarian-American textile executive and philanthropist who survived the Holocaust, working as a textile executive in Hungary, Yugoslavia, and the United States.

== Early years ==
Born in Budapest, Austria-Hungary, Teszler spent his early years in hospitals in Budapest being treated for club feet, but after several years of treatment, was able to enter school. After attending high school in Budapest, he studied textile engineering at the University of Chemnitz in Germany. As a Jew, Teszler was unable to attend university in Hungary because the quota of Jewish students had already been filled.

== Early career ==
Following his graduation from the University of Chemnitz, he joined his brother's textile company in Zagreb, Croatia in 1925. In 1929, the firm merged with another firm and moved to Čakovec, Croatia. The textile industry in Yugoslavia was almost nonexistent at this point, because most textile firms had been in the Czech part of the Austro-Hungarian Empire. By 1941, it had become a large, vertically-integrated firm, with spinning, dyeing, weaving, knitting, and apparel manufacturing.

== World War II ==
Following the German invasion of Yugoslavia in April 1941, the area in which his factory was located came under Hungarian control. The factory continued to produce textile goods for the Hungarian government. For three years, the Teszler family, including his wife and two sons, was unharmed. When the German army occupied Hungary in 1944, the situation for Hungary's Jews deteriorated rapidly. The intervention of factory workers themselves kept the Teszler family from being deported, but resulted in their being virtually imprisoned on the factory grounds for six months. Later taken with his family back to Budapest, he was able to go into hiding, but in November, was taken to a death house. On the verge of committing suicide by taking cyanide tablets, they were saved by the intervention of the Swiss consul, who was responsible for Yugoslav citizens in Budapest.

After they were liberated by the Soviets, the Teszlers tried to rebuild their lives. The Yugoslav government seized their factory, claiming they had collaborated with the Germans. Teszler was one of three experts in textiles who helped to rebuild Hungary's textile industry, but deteriorating conditions and the pending takeover of Hungary's government by Communists led him to leave for Great Britain, where his sons were in school.

== Years in America ==
In January 1948, Teszler emigrated to New York City, where he began managing one of his brother's textile factories on Long Island. His sons followed, and both enrolled at North Carolina State University to study textiles and chemistry. In 1960, his son Andrew Teszler moved to Spartanburg, South Carolina to start the Butte Knitting Mill, and in 1961, Sandor Teszler sold his plant on Long Island and moved to Spartanburg. He started a textile factory in nearby Kings Mountain, North Carolina, and because of his experience with discrimination in Europe, he intentionally integrated his plant. In 1965, he sold his plant to Reeves Brothers and began working with Andrew Teszler in Spartanburg.

In 1971, Andrew Teszler, a member of the Wofford College Board of Trustees, contributed funds to Wofford in honor of his father, and the college's new library, opened in 1969, was named the Sandor Teszler Library in his honor. In that same year, Andrew Teszler left Butte Knitting and started a new company, called the Olympia Mill, and after his sudden death in May 1971, Sandor Teszler became chairman of that company. He continued to work there until his retirement in 1979, after Monsanto had taken ownership.

== Retirement and legacy ==
In retirement, Sandor Teszler traveled and audited courses at Wofford College. After the death of his wife of 54 years, Lidia, in 1981 and the death of his son Otto in 1990, he became a fixture on the Wofford campus, attending courses and reading books in the library that bears his name.

In those years, he audited over fifty classes at the college, particularly ones in the humanities, art history, philosophy, and history. Students took to calling him "Opi," a Hungarian word for grandfather. The college awarded him an honorary doctor of humanities degree in 1987. In 1996, when he was 93 years old, the faculty of the college voted to make him a professor in the humanities. In informing him of his appointment, the college's academic dean noted that "although you have come to campus as our student, the truth is that we have been your student for years."

The paintings given by Sandor Teszler formed the core of Wofford College's Easter European collection. In addition to his involvement at Wofford, Teszler was a contributor to numerous local institutions.

Teszler concluded his 1990 Memoir with the remarks,"How is it that I feel that I was not embittered or scarred by the experiences of my condition in my childhood and of the horrors of my adult life in Yugoslavia and Hungary? …I do not know why this is so, but in spite of all the tragedy of my life, I do know that whatever kindness I have shown others has been returned to me."

== Sandor Teszler Award for Moral Courage and Service to Humankind ==
After his death in 2000, at age 97, Wofford College created the Sandor Teszler Award for Moral Courage and Service to Humankind in his memory. That award has been presented thus far to Marian Wright Edelman, Dr. Paul Farmer, Vernon Baker, Jacqueline Novogratz, John Wood and Eboo Patel. Sandor Teszler was also the subject of Wofford President Benjamin B. Dunlap’s 2007 TED Talk.

== Sources ==
- Wofford College president Bernie Dunlap tells the story of Sandor Teszler, a TED talk
- Memoirs of Sandor Teszler on the Teszler Library website
