= Kevin Mack =

American football player (born 1962)

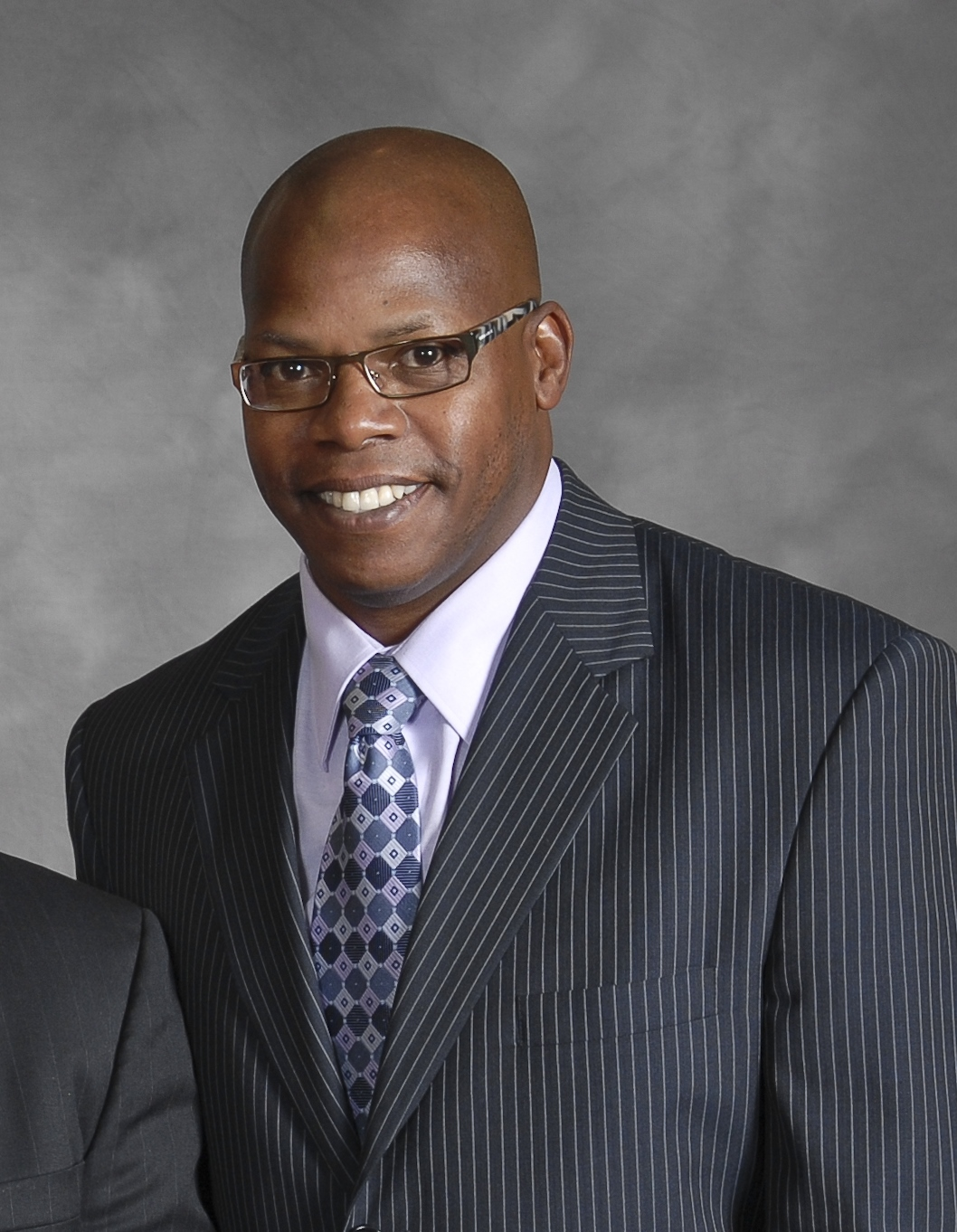
- Mack in 2012

No. 34
- Position: Fullback

Personal information
- Born: August 9, 1962 (age 64); Kings Mountain, North Carolina, U.S.

Career information
- High school: Kings Mountain
- College: Clemson (1980–1983)
- Supplemental draft: 1984: 1st round, 11th overall pick

Career history
- Los Angeles Express (1984); Cleveland Browns (1985–1993)

Awards and highlights
- 2× Pro Bowl (1985, 1987); PFWA All-Rookie Team (1985); Cleveland Browns Legends; National champion (1981)

Career NFL statistics
- Rushing yards: 5,123
- Rushing average: 4
- Rushing touchdowns: 46
- Stats at Pro Football Reference

James Kevin Mack (born August 9, 1962) is an American former professional football player who was a fullback for the Cleveland Browns of the National Football League (NFL). He played college football for the Clemson Tigers.

== Early life ==
Mack was born in Kings Mountain, North Carolina. He began playing football as a youth in Pop Warner football games, but he was more focused as a teenager in track competitions. He was a star athlete at Kings Mountain High School.

Mack attended Clemson University for four years where he played football for its team, helping them win the national championship in 1981. He averaged over five yards per carry his senior year at Clemson, running 886 yards and scoring 8 touchdowns.

== Professional athletic career ==
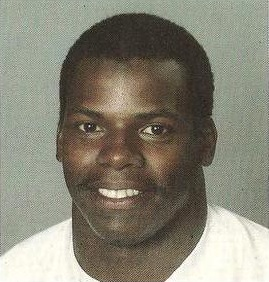
Mack in 1985

Mack was selected by the Washington Federals in the 1984 USFL Territorial Draft. He was traded to the Los Angeles Express, where he played the 1984 USFL season.

He was also selected by the Cleveland Browns 11th overall in the 1984 NFL Supplemental Draft of USFL and CFL Players. He joined the Browns to play the 1985 NFL season. As a rookie, he rushed for 1,104 yards and 7 touchdowns and was the AFC Rookie of the year.

Mack played for the Browns for nine seasons, from 1985 to 1993. In 1985, Mack rushed for 1,104 yards and halfback Earnest Byner rushed for 1,001 yards, becoming just the third pair of teammates to run for over 1,000 yards for the same team in the same season. Nicknamed "Mack Truck", he was a two-time Pro Bowl selection in 1985 and 1987.

== After athletic career ==
After playing in the NFL, Mack relocated to Houston, Texas, where among other work he was a coach, including at Texas Southern University.

Since returning to Cleveland, Ohio, Mack has worked for the Cleveland Browns in its Alumni Relations Department. He had originally expected to become a talent scout for the team, initially being named the team's Assistant Director of Player Programs when coming back to the organization in 2007.

== NFL career statistics ==
Legend
**Bold**	Career high

Year	Team	Games		Rushing						Receiving					Fumbles	
Year	Team	GP	GS	Att	Yds	Avg	Y/G	Lng	TD	Rec	Yds	Avg	Lng	TD	Fum	FR
1985	CLE	**16**	**15**	**222**	**1,104**	**5.0**	**69.0**	61	7	29	297	10.2	43	**3**	4	3
1986	CLE	12	12	174	665	3.8	55.4	20	**10**	28	292	**10.4**	**44**	0	**6**	1
1987	CLE	12	12	201	735	3.7	61.3	22	5	32	223	7.0	17	1	**6**	1
1988	CLE	11	11	123	485	3.9	44.1	**65**	3	11	87	7.9	25	0	5	1
1989	CLE	4	1	37	130	3.5	32.5	12	1	2	7	3.5	4	0	1	0
1990	CLE	14	14	158	702	4.4	50.1	26	5	**42**	**360**	8.6	30	2	**6**	**5**
1991	CLE	14	11	197	726	3.7	51.9	51	8	40	255	6.4	22	2	1	0
1992	CLE	12	6	169	543	3.2	45.3	37	6	13	81	6.2	23	0	1	0
1993	CLE	4	0	10	33	3.3	8.3	7	1	–	–	–	–	–	–	–
Career		99	82	1,291	5,123	4.0	51.7	65	46	197	1,602	8.1	44	8	30	11

== Awards and recognition ==
- 1981: Honorable Mention All-American
- 1981: MVP, Blue-Gray All-Star Game
- 1985: AFC Rookie of the Year
- 2000: Kings Mountain's Football Player of the 20th Century (designated by Kings Mountain Herald)
- 2012: 58th Greatest football player in the history of the NFL's Cleveland Browns (designated by Cleveland.com)
- 2012: Kings Mountain's Player of the Decade of the 1970s
- 2016: Dino Lucarelli Lifetime Achievement Award (National Football Foundation and Cleveland Touchdown Club Charities)
- 2016: Greater Cleveland Sports Hall of Fame
- 2017: Cleveland County Sports Hall of Fame
- 2023: National High School Football Hall of Fame

== Personal life ==
Mack has mentioned having two daughters who were young when he resided in Houston, Texas; he lived there for about 14 years.

In 1989 in Cuyahoga County Court in Cleveland, Mack pleaded guilty to cocaine use in exchange for three other charges (cocaine trafficking, possession of criminal tools, and using a motor vehicle for drug abuse) being dropped. He was sentenced to six months in jail.
