= Kings Mountain High School =

American public school in North Carolina

Location
- 500 Phifer Rd; Kings Mountain, North Carolina; United States; 35°13′59″N 81°22′18″W

Information
- Former name: Kings Mountain Graded School, Central School
- Type: Public high school
- Established: 1905 (121 years ago)
- School district: Cleveland County School District
- Principal: Mrs. Melissa Wilson
- Faculty: 82
- Grades: 9–12
- Enrollment: 1,278 (2016)
- Colors: Black and Athletic Gold
- Nickname: Mountaineers
- Website: kmhs.clevelandcountyschools.org

Kings Mountain High School is a public high school in Kings Mountain, North Carolina, United States. It is part of the Cleveland County School System which is overseen by the Cleveland County Board of Education, and it is one of the county's five public high schools. Kings Mountain, North Carolina is considered part of the Shelby, North Carolina metro area.

== History and description ==
In 1905, Kings Mountain Graded School was founded. Known as Central School, all grade levels (1–11) were in one building, which was not fully completed for five years.

Today, the school has about 80 faculty members. The building features a library which is part of Cleve-net (a regional library network) and an auditorium.

== Curriculum ==
Coursework at KMHS includes Advanced Placement classes. The school has a Spanish program and theatre production classes.

== Students ==
The high school offers classes for grades 9 through 12. The school graduates 94% of its senior class. The total student population is about 1,250.

== Athletics ==
Kings Mountain High School athletics include the following sports:

- Baseball
- Basketball
- Cross Country
- Football
- Golf
- Soccer
- Softball
- Swimming
- Tennis
- Track & Field
- Volleyball
- Wrestling

== Notable alumni ==
- George Adams – professional basketball player
- Dremiel Byers – Greco-Roman wrestler, World Champion and part of two Olympic teams in 2008 and 2012
- Hal England – actor
- Tracy Johnson former NFL fullback
- Kevin Mack – NFL fullback and two-time Pro Bowl selection
- Tim Moore – attorney and politician
- Calvin Stephens – former NFL offensive guard
- Will Wilson – MLB infielder
