= Jacob S. Mauney Memorial Library and Teacher's Home =

Historic library and house in North Carolina, US

- U.S. National Register of Historic Places
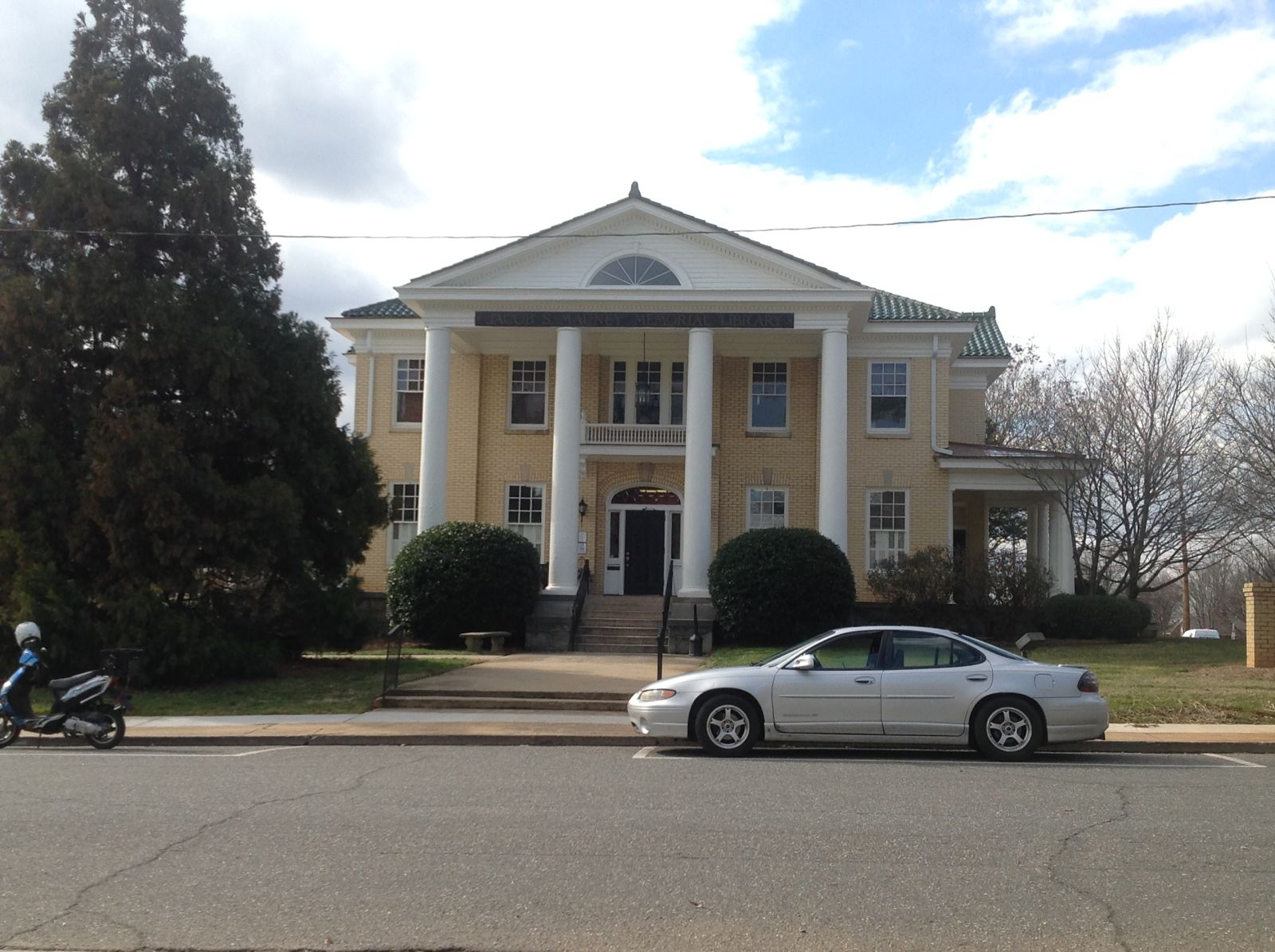
- Jacob S. Mauney Memorial Library, February 2015

- Location within North Carolina Location within the United States
- Location: 100 S. Piedmont Ave., Kings Mountain, North Carolina
- Coordinates: 35°14′27″N 81°20′34″W
- Area: Less than one acre
- Built: 1923, 1987–1988, 1999–2000
- Architectural style: Southern Colonial Revival
- NRHP reference No.: 14001049
- Added to NRHP: December 16, 2014

Jacob S. Mauney Memorial Library and Teacher's Home, also known as the Mauney Memorial Library and Dr. Jacob George Van Buren Hord House, is a historic home and library located at Kings Mountain, Cleveland County, North Carolina. It was built in 1923 as a private dwelling and donated to the city of Kings Mountain in 1947. From 1947 to about 1962–1963, the building also functioned as a teacherage for the Kings Mountain school system. It is a two-story, five-bay, yellow-brick Southern Colonial Revival-style house. The front facade features a two-story, pedimented tetrastyle portico with stucco-finished masonry columns. It has a one-story rear block added in 1987–1988 and the Harris Children's Wing, a two-level addition of 1999–2000.

It was listed on the National Register of Historic Places in 2014.
