= Tim Moore (North Carolina politician) =

American politician (born 1970)

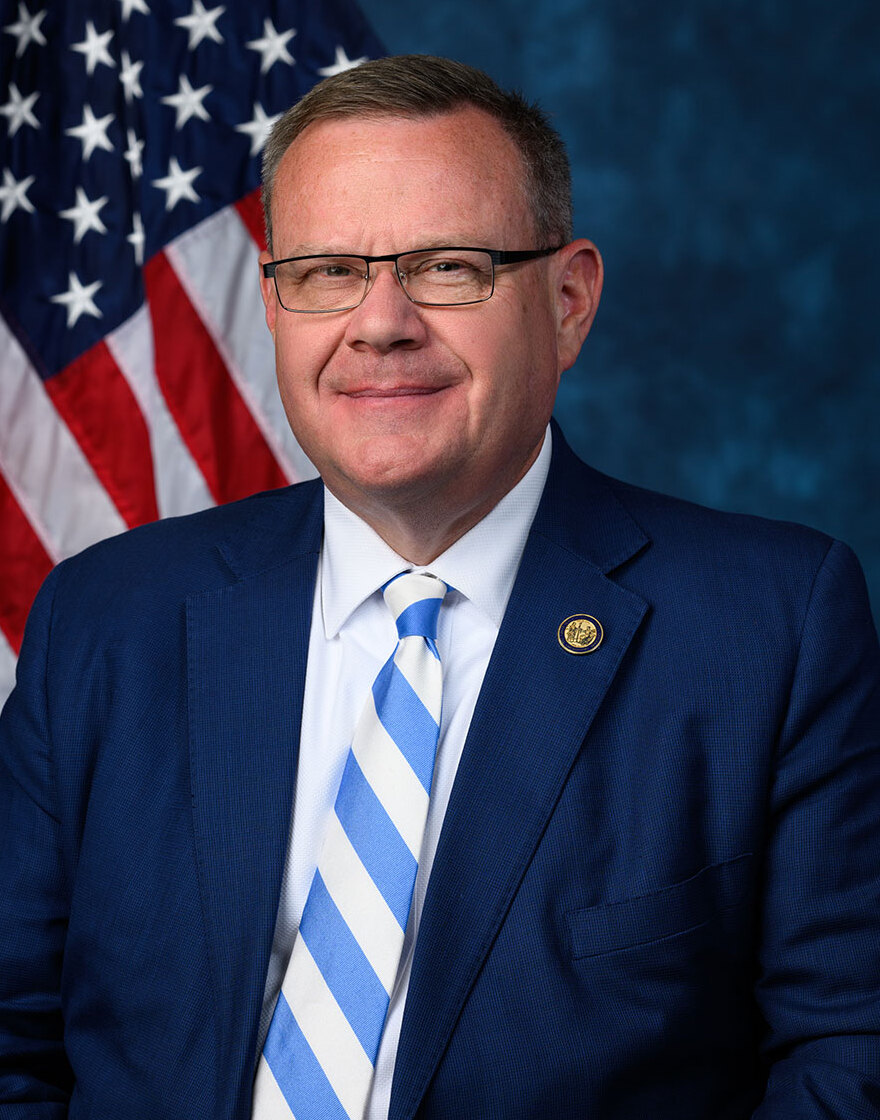
- Official portrait, 2025

Member of the U.S. House of Representatives from North Carolina's 14th district
- Incumbent
- Assumed office January 3, 2025
- Preceded by: Jeff Jackson
- Succeeded by: LaKesha Womack (elect)

Speaker of the North Carolina House of Representatives
- In office January 14, 2015 – January 1, 2025
- Preceded by: Thom Tillis
- Succeeded by: Destin Hall

Member of the North Carolina House of Representatives from the 111th district
- In office January 1, 2003 – January 1, 2025
- Preceded by: Andy Dedmon (redistricted)
- Succeeded by: Paul Scott

Personal details
- Born: Timothy Keith Moore; October 2, 1970 (age 56) Kings Mountain, North Carolina, U.S.
- Party: Republican
- Children: 2
- Education: Campbell University (attended); University of North Carolina, Chapel Hill (BA); Oklahoma City University (JD)
- Website: House website Campaign website

Timothy Keith Moore (born October 2, 1970) is an American attorney and politician who has been the U.S. representative for North Carolina's 14th congressional district since 2025. He previously served as speaker of the North Carolina House of Representatives from 2015 to 2025. A Republican, Moore represented the 111th State House District, which includes Cleveland County. Moore was first elected to the state House in 2002.

== Early life and education ==
Moore was born on October 2, 1970, in Kings Mountain, North Carolina, in the western part of the state. He attended Kings Mountain High School, and as a teenager, Moore worked at the state General Assembly as a page, later interning for a state senator.

Moore first attended Campbell College, where he joined the College Republicans. After two years he transferred to the University of North Carolina at Chapel Hill, where he completed a B.A. in 1992. He was active in the student government at both colleges. He took a fight to the UNC student Supreme Court in an effort to add more members to the Student Congress. In 1995, Moore graduated with a degree from the Oklahoma City University School of Law.

== Legal and business career ==
In 1995, Moore joined a law firm in the Cleveland County town of Shelby. He opened his own law practice in Kings Mountain in 2009, representing business and individual clients.

In 2015, Moore was hired by the Cleveland County Commission as an attorney for the county, serving in this role simultaneously with his position as speaker of the state House.

Moore co-owns 67 Motors, a Forsyth County metal recycling business.

== Early political career ==
When Moore was 26, he was elected chair of the Cleveland County Republican Party in 1997. That same year, he was also appointed to the University of North Carolina Board of Governors; he was the youngest person to be appointed to that position.

== North Carolina House of Representatives (2003–2025) ==
Moore was first elected to the North Carolina House of Representatives in 2002, after defeating the incumbent House Majority Whip, Democratic Representative Andy Dedmon. A staunch conservative Republican, Moore spent his first four terms in office in the minority party, as Democrats then controlled the House. In 2010, the Republicans won control of the House, and Speaker Thom Tillis appointed Moore to the powerful post of chairman of the Rules Committee, where he became known for abruptly cutting off many floor debates.

As part of the Republican leadership team in the House, Moore helped pass "sweeping legislation to lower taxes on business, tighten rules on abortion and voting, and decline to extend Medicaid coverage to 500,000 uninsured North Carolinians." Moore opposes same-sex marriage, supported a state constitutional amendment to ban same-sex marriage in 2012, and joined legal efforts to defend the ban. However, in 2017, when a group of the state House's most conservative Republicans proposed legislation that would declare "null and void" the U.S. Supreme Court decision in Obergefell v. Hodges (2015) (which held that there is a constitutional right to same-sex marriage), Moore blocked the bill from advancing in the state House.

In 2014 Moore was one of the state House's biggest campaign fundraisers. His skill at fundraising for the Republican Party contributed to his election as speaker of the North Carolina House in 2015.

Moore and State Senator Harry Brown were the top two North Carolina lawmakers to gain substantial earmarked funding for their districts in the 2015 state budget, securing a collective total of $19 million. Moore defended his use of earmarks for projects in his district.

=== Speaker of the House ===
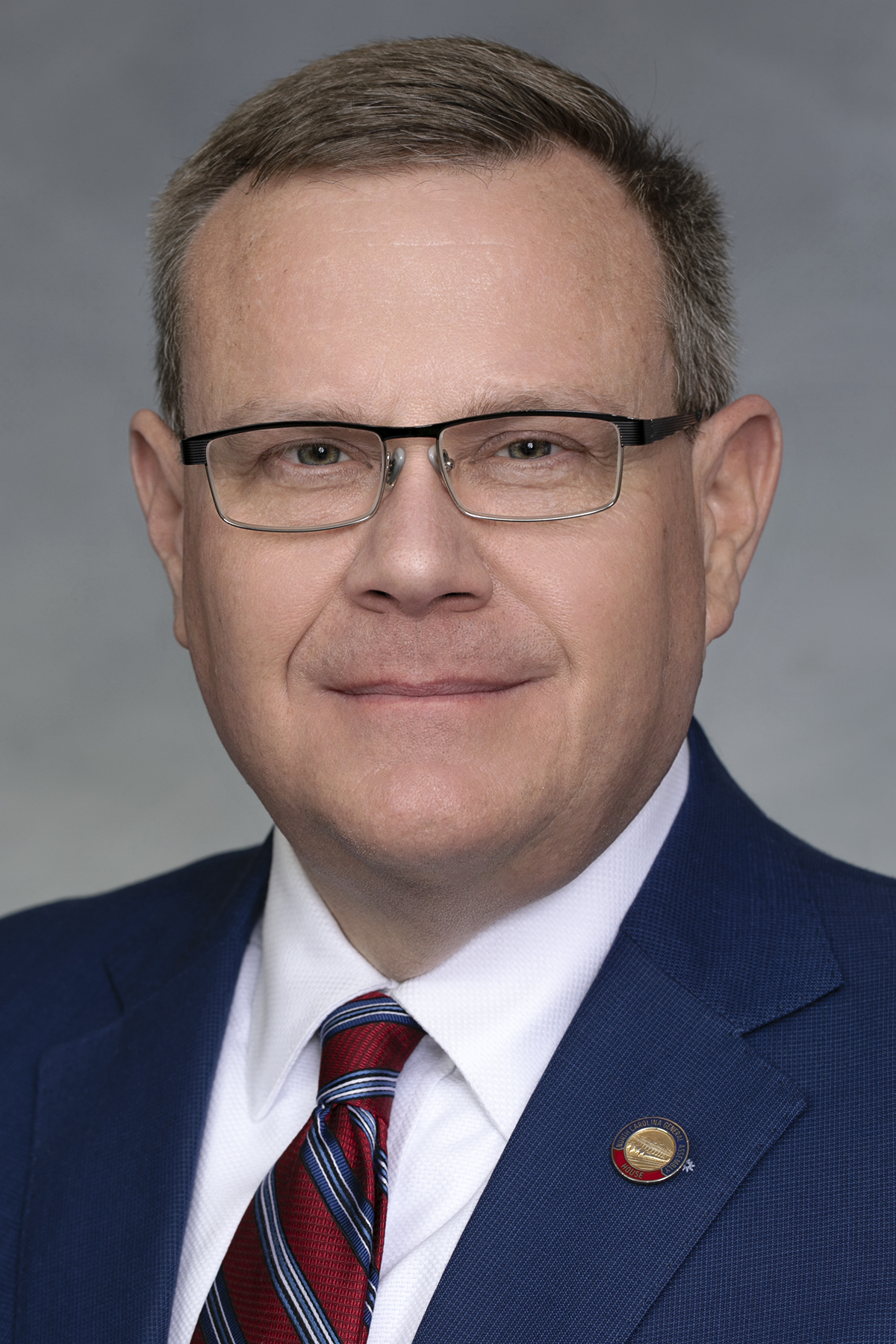
Official portrait, 2023

Moore was a sponsor in 2016 of House Bill 2, a controversial "bathroom bill" barring transgender individuals from using bathrooms that conform to their gender identity. After the U.S. Department of Justice said that the legislation violated federal anti-discrimination law and demanded that the state cease implementation, Moore rejected the DOJ's position and accused the Obama administration of "bullying", saying, "The deadline will come and go. We will take no action."

Moore has opposed curbs on gerrymandering in North Carolina. In a legal suit against partisan gerrymandering in the state, Moore and his state Senate counterpart (Republican Phil Berger) urged the U.S. Supreme Court to overturn a lower court's ruling that the partisan gerrymandering of North Carolina's congressional districts was unconstitutional.

In 2018, Moore won a third term as speaker of the House.

In 2018, following a mass shooting at Stoneman Douglas High School in Parkland, Florida, Moore established a North Carolina House Select Committee on School Safety. Moore rejected Democratic proposals to discuss changes to gun laws, and the committee never took up gun control proposals. Moore instead proposed the use of volunteer officers to guard schools.

In 2019, a controversy took place after emails came to light, showing that in 2016, a high-ranking aide to Moore had corresponded with the North Carolina Department of Environmental Quality (DEQ) about a Siler City chicken processing plant co-owned by Moore that was being offered for sale. At the aide's request, DEQ approved the plant's participation in a state subsidy program that provided $22,000 for the repair of a leaking underground storage tank at the factory, which may have aided in the sale of the plant. The revelation prompted the Campaign for Accountability to file a complaint with the North Carolina State Ethics Commission. Moore denied knowledge of the emails. A previous complaint against Moore regarding the Siler City chicken plant was dismissed in 2018. The North Carolina State Board of Elections and Ethics reviewed the complaint and information resulting from the staff's investigation. The investigating panel from the State Elections and Ethics Board unanimously voted to dismiss the complaint upon conclusion of their inquiry.

In 2019, Democratic Governor Roy Cooper vetoed the state budget. On the morning of September 11, 2019, during a calendared legislative session Moore called a vote to override the veto of the state budget. The override passed on a vote of 55–9. Nearly half of members were absent during the vote, most of the absent members were Democrats. Democrats in the state House were greatly angered by the Republicans' move, saying that Moore and other House Republican leaders had made assurances that no votes would be called during the morning session. Moore defended the vote and said that he had made no pledges that no vote would take place.

In 2021, a new 14th congressional district was created that included Moore's home of Cleveland County. While Moore was expected to run for the seat, he said he would not after Madison Cawthorn announced his candidacy. Moore said he would run for another House term.

== U.S. House of Representatives (2025–present) ==
Tim Moore announced his candidacy for Congress in late 2023 for North Carolina's 14th congressional district. The first-term Democratic incumbent, Jeff Jackson, opted to run for North Carolina Attorney General after the third round of redistricting of the decade pushed the district into heavily Republican territory west of Charlotte, including Moore's home in Kings Mountain. Moore won his race against Democrat Pam Genant and was sworn in on January 3, 2025.

In January 2025, President Donald Trump appointed Moore to serve on a board investigating FEMA's disaster response following Hurricane Helene.

Moore was initially a heavy favorite for a second term against Democrat LaKesha Womack in the 2026 midterms. Womack only raised $60,000 to Moore's $2.2 million, not enough to produce any ads. However, Moore lost to Womack in a considerable upset, becoming one of five Republican incumbents from North Carolina defeated despite a congressional map intended to give the GOP 11 of the state's 14 seats. While Moore carried five of the district's six counties, he could not overcome a 35,800-vote deficit in the district's share of Mecklenburg County.

=== Committee assignments ===
- Committee on the Budget
- Committee on Financial Services
  - Subcommittee on Digital Assets, Financial Technology, and Artificial Intelligence
  - Subcommittee on Financial Institutions
  - Subcommittee on Oversight and Investigations (Vice Chair)

== 2026 Midterm Election ==
In November 2026, Tim Moore ran for reelection for North Carolina's 14th Congressional District against Lakesha Womack. Moore out raised Womack $1.9 million to $56,000, a massive 34:1 ratio. Moore was also pivotal in the redrawing of his own district back when he was Speaker of the North Carolina House, creating a significant Republican presence in his district. Moore so heavily gerrymandered his own district, that he told WUNC on the first day of early voting that he'd been knocking doors and talking to voters "even though I probably wouldn't have to if I didn't want to."

Moore lost his re-election to Womack, 48.9% to 51.1%.

This midterm result was one of the biggest upsets in the United States 2026 Midterms. It was the first race Lakesha Womack had ever entered, and Moore was Speaker of the N.C. House for ten years, with a political career spanning 24 years.

== Controversies ==
While a member of the North Carolina House of Representatives, Moore directed state funding toward projects in his home county of Cleveland. In 2016, Cleveland County received a $1.5 million grant-funded water and sewer upgrades for an area where several individuals with close connections to Moore's campaign resided. In 2018, the county received $500,000 in the state budget to host the American Legion Baseball World Series, which it had hosted since 2011 with no state funds.

In 2012, Moore's private law practice in Kings Mountain received a $62,000 development grant, during a year which was noted for steep state budget cuts. Moore was advised by a member of the state's ethics commission to avoid conflicts of interest or the appearance of conflicts of interest after this.

In 2015, an article written by a local journalist prompted an FBI inquiry into Moore's campaign reports. The FBI declined to comment on the inquiry, and there were never any charges filed regarding the allegations of wrongdoing.

Also that year, conservative bloggers and a Charlotte TV station raised questions about Moore paying his own company rent, from campaign funds, for a condo that Moore owned in Raleigh.

In 2019, Moore's legislative aides engaged with the state Department of Environmental Quality (DEQ) in regards to a property Moore owned. Moore and his business partners sold that property to Mountaire Farms, an Arkansas-based poultry conglomerate that is a donor to North Carolina Republicans, for a 650% profit.

In 2022, Holly Grange, a former state representative and member of the UNC-Wilmington Board of Trustees, alleged that she was removed from the board because Moore was upset she did not support his preferred candidate for the next Chancellor of UNC-Wilmington.

In June 2023, a suit was brought by Scott Lassiter, a Wake Soil and Water Conservation District and former Apex Town Council member, alleging that Moore had enticed Lassiter's wife into an affair. Moore said the lawsuit was baseless. The suit was resolved in July 2023. In August 2023, Wake County, N.C. state representative Terence Everitt asked the county district attorney to investigate Moore's alleged affair with a state employee. Moore subsequently had Everitt's office moved to a supply room in the basement of the General Assembly building. Moore also wrote Everitt a letter telling him the move was for his own good, to avoid conflicts during a tense session, but Everitt said the move was retaliatory. When Moore lost his re-election campaign in 2026 for the U.S. House, Everitt sent Moore a similar letter, noting that the voters had chosen to "relocate" Moore's office.

Moore sponsored H.R. 3780 (119th Congress) on June 6, 2025, calling for a Border Operations Service Medal. "A country without secure borders is a country in name only. These heroes are on the front lines defending the American people from violent cartels, human traffickers, terrorists, and mass illegal crossings...they don’t ask for recognition, but they’ve more than earned it," said Moore. The Mexican Border Defense Medal (MBDM) was established by a memorandum of the United States Department of Defense on August 13, 2025, for US military service members who have deployed to the southern US border backdated to January 20, 2025, in support of the US Customs and Border Protection Agency (CBP).

=== Stock trading ===
In June 2025, Moore violated the STOCK Act's disclosure provisions when he failed to report stock purchases which were made immediately prior and after President Donald Trump's Liberation Day tariffs declaration in April 2025. The totals were in the hundreds of thousands of dollars.

In July 2025, he purchased between $15,001 and $50,000 in Intel stock just 24 days before a major partnership between Intel and the U.S. government was announced. In the same month, Moore also purchased between $65,000 and $150,000 in Centene and United Health stocks following his vote for the One Big Beautiful Bill Act. This Act devalued them by cutting Medicaid, a government program that both companies receive revenue from. He then shortly sold those positions for a profit in mid-August 2025 all while serving as Vice Chair of the Subcommittee on Financial Oversight and Investigations which overseas investigations into those companies. A spokesperson for Moore denied he had taken part in insider trading.

== Personal life ==
Moore has two sons, Mcrae and Wilson. He is a member of First Baptist Church of Kings Mountain, which is a member of the Southern Baptist Convention.

== Electoral history ==
=== 2024 ===
United States House of Representatives NC-14 General Election
Party	Candidate	Votes	%
Republican	Tim Moore	232,988	58.06%
Democratic	Pam Genant	168,275	41.94%
Total votes		401,263	100%
Republican gain from Democratic			

=== 2020 ===
North Carolina House of Representatives 111th district general election, 2020
Party	Candidate	Votes	%
Republican	Tim Moore (incumbent)	24,491	63.52%
Democratic	Jennifer Childers	14,063	36.48%
Total votes		38,554	100%
Republican hold			

=== 2018 ===
North Carolina House of Representatives 111th district general election, 2018
Party	Candidate	Votes	%
Republican	Tim Moore (incumbent)	16,511	65.41%
Democratic	David C. Brinkley	8,733	34.59%
Total votes		25,244	100%
Republican hold			

=== 2016 ===
North Carolina House of Representatives 111th district general election, 2016
Party	Candidate	Votes	%
Republican	Tim Moore (incumbent)	25,398	100%
Total votes		25,398	100%
Republican hold			

=== 2014 ===
North Carolina House of Representatives 111th district general election, 2014
Party	Candidate	Votes	%
Republican	Tim Moore (incumbent)	15,338	100%
Total votes		15,338	100%
Republican hold			

=== 2012 ===
North Carolina House of Representatives 111th district general election, 2012
Party	Candidate	Votes	%
Republican	Tim Moore (incumbent)	22,441	100%
Total votes		22,441	100%
Republican hold			

=== 2010 ===
North Carolina House of Representatives 111th district general election, 2010
Party	Candidate	Votes	%
Republican	Tim Moore (incumbent)	11,972	65.12%
Democratic	Mary S. Accor	6,413	34.88%
Total votes		18,385	100%
Republican hold			

=== 2008 ===
North Carolina House of Representatives 111th district general election, 2008
Party	Candidate	Votes	%
Republican	Tim Moore (incumbent)	20,077	100%
Total votes		20,077	100%
Republican hold			

=== 2006 ===
North Carolina House of Representatives 111th district general election, 2006
Party	Candidate	Votes	%
Republican	Tim Moore (incumbent)	9,841	60.72%
Democratic	Betsy H. Fonvielle	6,367	39.28%
Total votes		16,208	100%
Republican hold			

=== 2004 ===
North Carolina House of Representatives 111th district general election, 2004
Party	Candidate	Votes	%
Republican	Tim Moore (incumbent)	14,392	55.45%
Democratic	Kathryn H. Hamrick	11,565	44.55%
Total votes		25,957	100%
Republican hold			

=== 2002 ===
North Carolina House of Representatives 111th district general election, 2002
Party	Candidate	Votes	%
Republican	Tim Moore	9,790	52.97%
Democratic	Andy Dedmon (incumbent)	8,693	47.03%
Total votes		18,483	100%
Republican gain from Democratic			

Political offices
Preceded by Thom Tillis	Speaker of the North Carolina House of Representatives; 2015–2025	Succeeded by Destin Hall
U.S. House of Representatives
Preceded by Jeff Jackson	Member of the U.S. House of Representatives from North Carolina's 14th congressional district 2025–present	Incumbent
U.S. order of precedence (ceremonial)
Preceded by Riley Moore	United States representatives by seniority 407th	Succeeded by Kelly Morrison
