= West End Historic District (Kings Mountain, North Carolina) =

Historic district in North Carolina, United States

- West End Village Historic District
- U.S. National Register of Historic Places
- U.S. Historic district
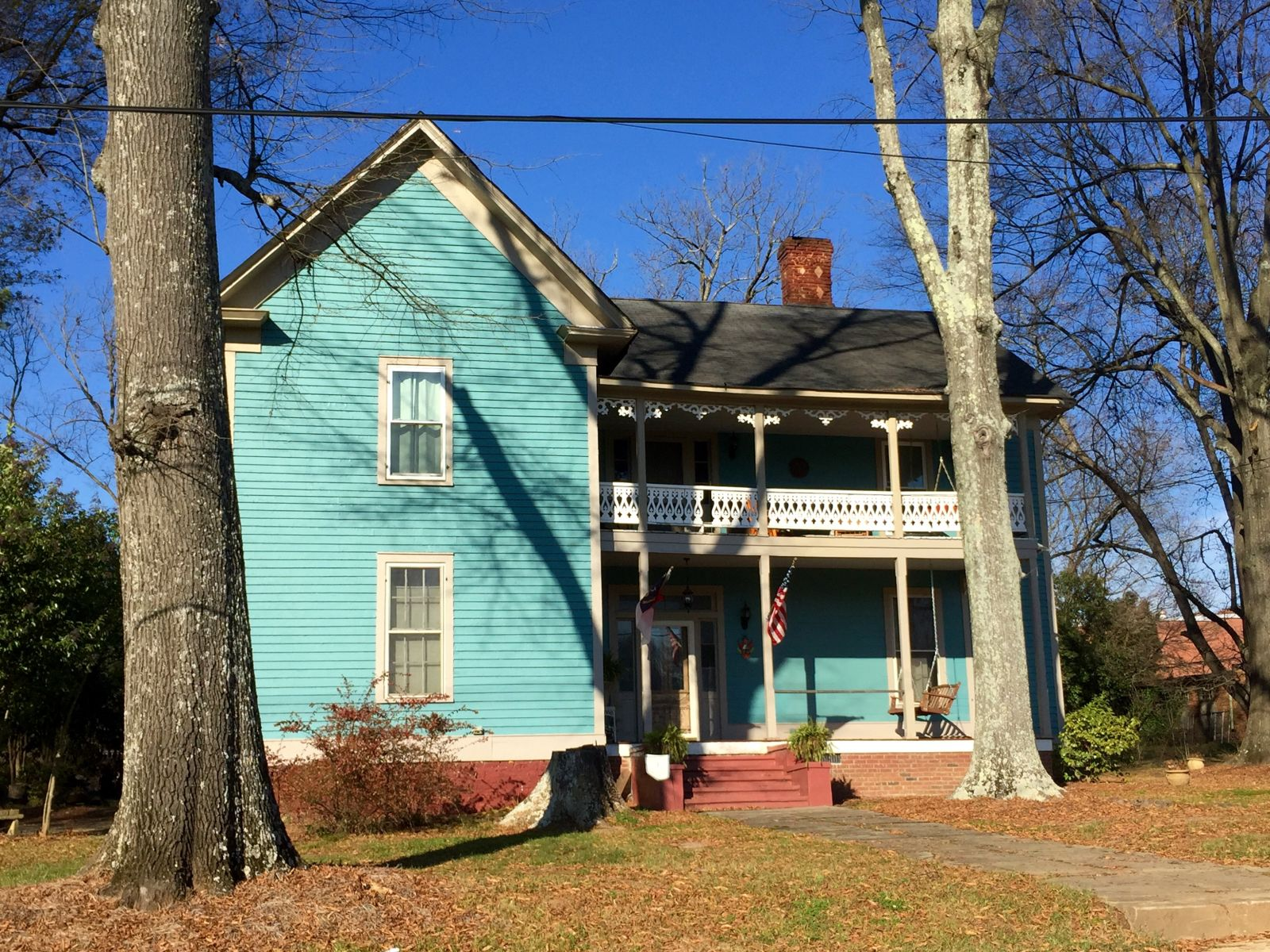
- Ware Family House

- Location within North Carolina Location within the United States
- Location: Bounded by W. Mountain St., W. Gold St., S. Cansler St., S. Tracy St., S. Watterson St., and S. Goforth St., Kings Mountain, North Carolina
- Coordinates: 35°14′19″N 81°21′00″W
- Area: 39 acres (16 ha)
- Built: c. 1882-1955
- Built by: Asbury, Louis Humbert; Breeze, Victor Winfred
- Architectural style: Colonial Revival, Queen Anne, Bungalow/craftsman
- NRHP reference No.: 10000630
- Added to NRHP: May 6, 2009

West End Village Historic District is a national historic district located at Kings Mountain, Cleveland County, North Carolina. It encompasses 100 contributing buildings and 1 contributing structure in a residential section of Kings Mountain. The houses date between about 1882 and 1955, and include representative examples of Queen Anne, Colonial Revival, and Bungalow / American Craftsman architectural styles.

It was listed on the National Register of Historic Places in 2009.

== Gallery ==
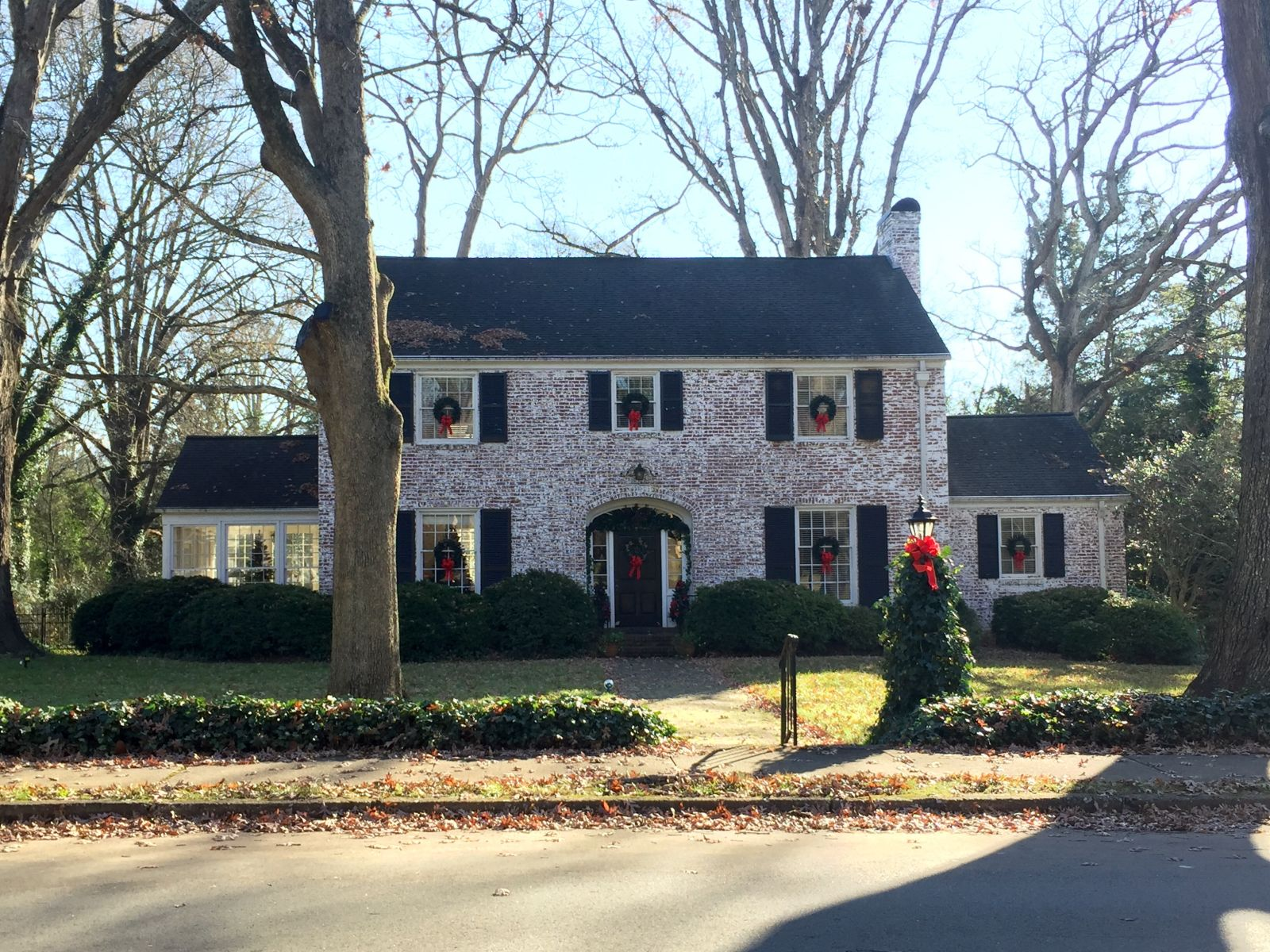
Dr. William Lee Ramseur House

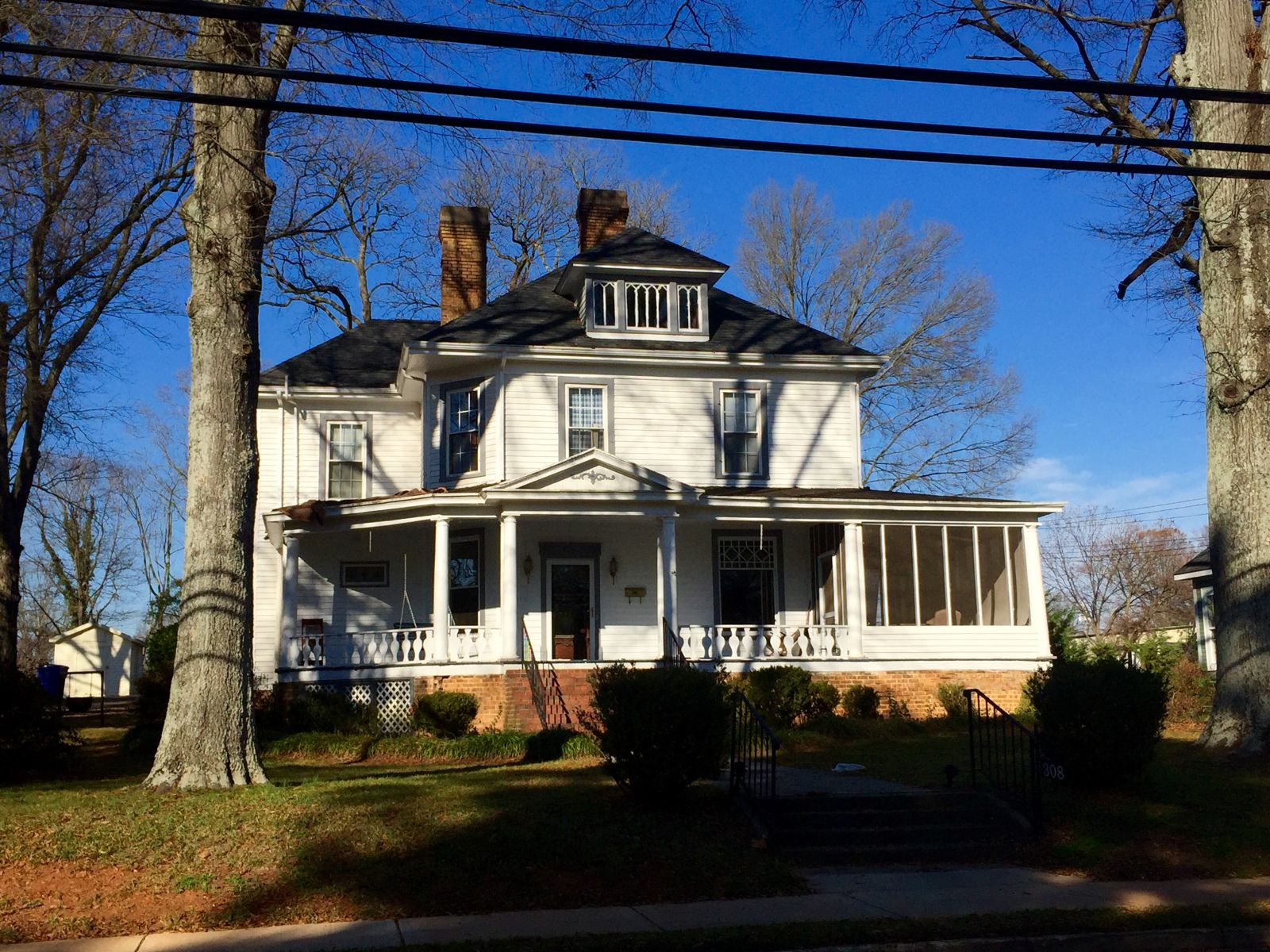
Willeford Family House
