= Laura Moss =

American actress of stage and television (born 1973)

Laura Moss (Laura Beth Moss)
- Born: November 1, 1973 (age 52); Kings Mountain, North Carolina, United States

Laura Moss (born November 1, 1973, in Kings Mountain, North Carolina) is an American actress of stage and television.

She is most known for being the fifth actress to play Amanda Cory on the soap opera Another World, a role she played from 1996 to 1998. She succeeded Christine Tucci in the role and had the original adult actress, Sandra Ferguson, succeed her in 1998.

On Broadway, she is most known for her role in the most recent adaptation of Death of a Salesman, starring alongside Brian Dennehy. She also reprised her stage role for a Showtime television movie of the same name.

She has co-authored several books for Growth Publishing.
