= Central School Historic District =

Historic district in North Carolina, United States

- U.S. National Register of Historic Places
- U.S. Historic district
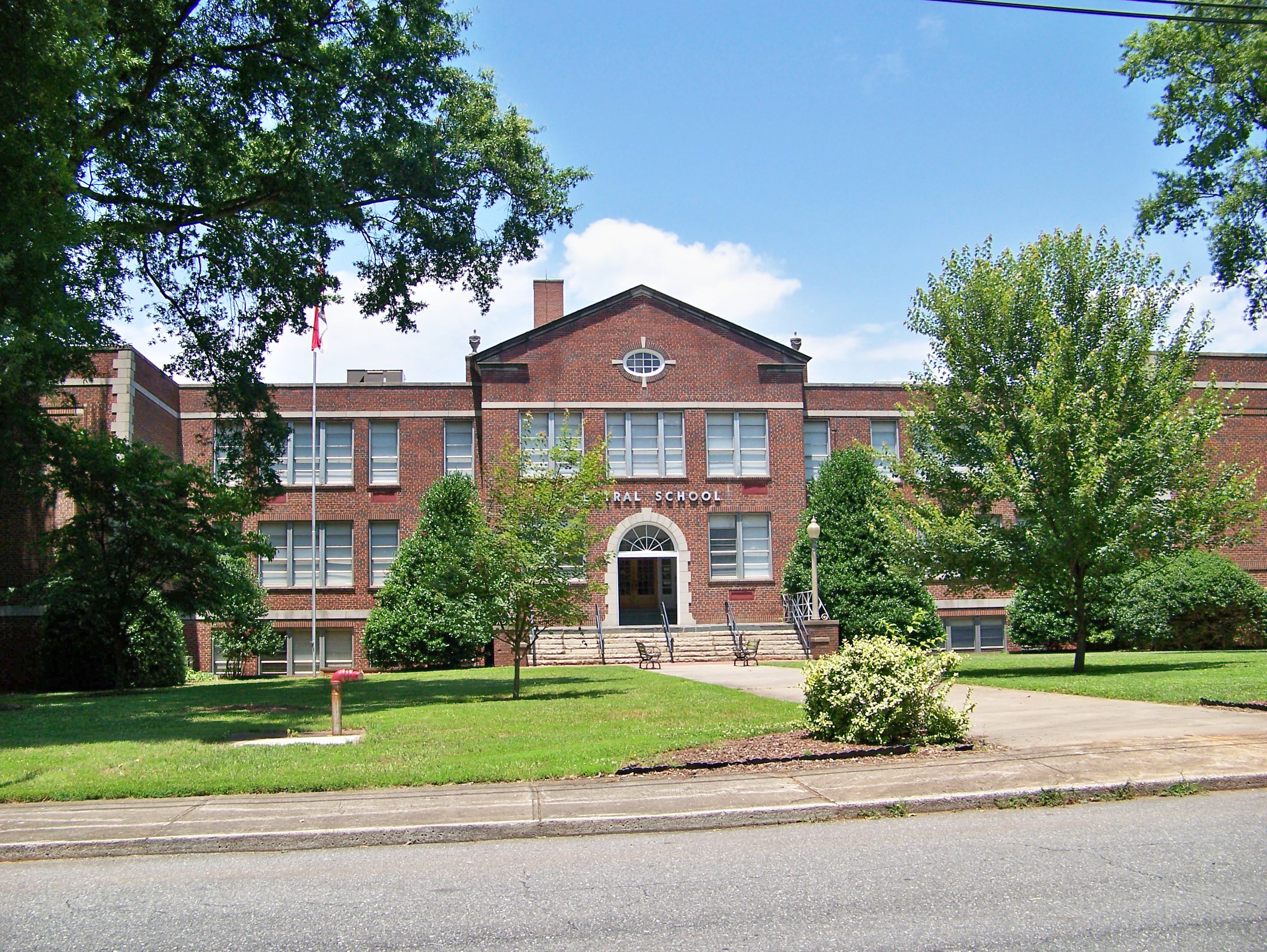
- Central School

- Location within North Carolina Location within the United States
- Location: Roughly N. Battleground Ave., N. Piedmont Ave., E. King St., E. Ridge Ave., and N. Gaston St., Kings Mountain, North Carolina
- Coordinates: 35°14′34″N 81°20′34″W
- Area: 21 acres (8.5 ha)
- Architectural style: Second Empire, Queen Anne, et al.
- NRHP reference No.: 01000513
- Added to NRHP: May 18, 2001

Central School Historic District is a national historic district located at Kings Mountain, Cleveland County, North Carolina. It encompasses 52 contributing buildings and 4 contributing structures in a residential section of Kings Mountain. The houses date between about 1870 and 1950, and include representative examples of the Second Empire and Queen Anne architectural styles. Notable nonresidential buildings are the Second Southern Railway Depot (1925), St. Matthew's Lutheran Church (1921, 1950), First Presbyterian Church (1936), and Central·High School (1933).

It was listed on the National Register of Historic Places in 2001.
