= Sam Jankovich =

American sports administrator (1934–2019)

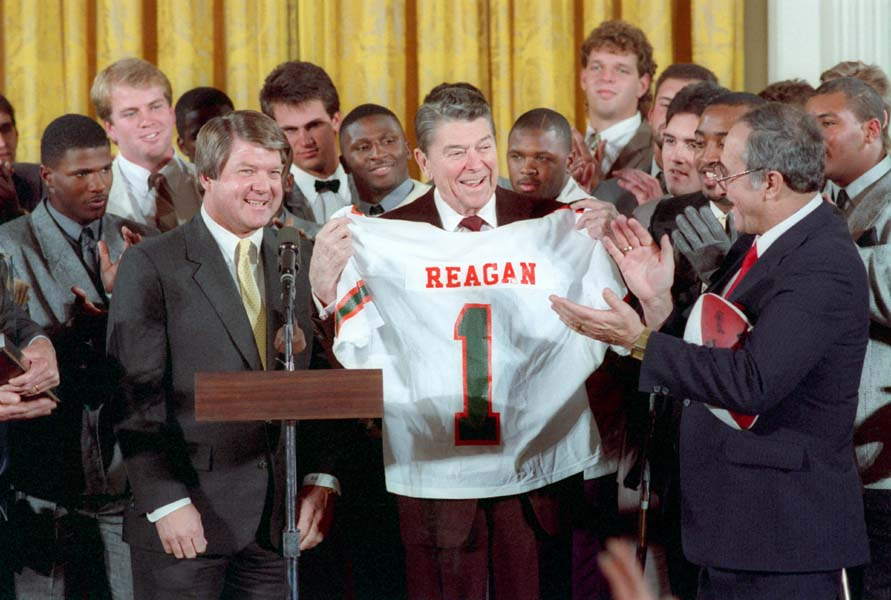
Jankovich (right), Miami Hurricanes football coach Jimmy Johnson and the 1987 Miami Hurricanes team present President Ronald Reagan with a University of Miami jersey at The White House after winning the 1987 national championship, January 1988

Sam Jankovich (September 10, 1934 – October 30, 2019) was an American sports administrator who held several positions, including athletic director at the Washington State University and the University of Miami. He also was the CEO of the New England Patriots of the National Football League (NFL) and president and general manager of the Las Vegas Gladiators of the Arena Football League (AFL).

== College ==
A native of Butte, Montana, Jankovich earned a letter in football in 1957 at the University of Montana in Missoula. His playing career was cut short by a serious knee injury; Jankovich tried to give his scholarship back but Grizzly coach Jerry Williams refused his offer.

== Coaching career ==
After graduation, Jankovich became a football coach at Butte High School, where he won two state championships. He later became an assistant coach at Montana State University in Bozeman under head coach Jim Sweeney. In 1968, he followed Sweeney to Washington State University in Pullman, where he served as head assistant coach and defensive coordinator. He left coaching in 1972, when he became an assistant to the athletic director at Washington State.

== Athletic administrator ==
After several years as an assistant athletic director, Jankovich succeeded Ray Nagel as WSU's athletic director in August 1976. He established a reputation for building athletic facilities, primarily expanding Martin Stadium in 1979 by lowering the field and removing the track. This required the addition of the new Mooberry track facility and the relocation of the baseball stadium.

In 1983, Jankovich took a job as athletic director at the University of Miami in southern Florida, and held this position until 1990. During his tenure, Miami's football team rose to perennial national power and men's basketball returned after a 15-year absence. Jankovich oversaw several national championships including three in football and one each in baseball, men's and women's tennis, and women's golf.

== NFL ==
In December 1990, Jankovich was hired by Victor Kiam as chief executive officer of the New England Patriots. He was hired to rebuild the team after a league-worst 1–15 finish, while being plagued by off-the-field problems. He left after two seasons, as the Patriots went 6–10 in 1991 and 2–14 in 1992.

== Later life ==
Jankovich then worked as a consultant to various corporations and universities including doing fundraising for the U.S. Olympic Committee. He would eventually become president and general manager of the Las Vegas Gladiators of the Arena Football League.

== 1979 highway collision ==
In the summer of 1979, Jankovich was involved in a fatal highway collision north of Pullman on a Sunday afternoon. He apparently fell asleep at the wheel and crossed the center line, but did not face criminal charges.
