= Will Wilson (baseball) =

American baseball player (born 1998)

Free agent
- Infielder
- Born: July 21, 1998 (age 28); Kings Mountain, North Carolina, U.S.
- Bats: Right Throws: Right

MLB debut
- April 23, 2025, for the Cleveland Guardians

MLB statistics (through 2026 season)
- Batting average: .193
- Home runs: 1
- Runs batted in: 4
- Stats at Baseball Reference

Teams
- Cleveland Guardians (2025); Seattle Mariners (2026)

William Bradley Wilson (born July 21, 1998) is an American professional baseball infielder who is a free agent. He has previously played in Major League Baseball (MLB) for the Cleveland Guardians and Seattle Mariners. Wilson played college baseball for the NC State Wolfpack, and was selected with the 15th overall pick of the 2019 MLB draft by the Los Angeles Angels. He made his MLB debut in 2025.

== Amateur career ==
Alongside baseball, Wilson also played football and basketball in middle school. He attended Kings Mountain High School in Kings Mountain, North Carolina. While playing high school football, he was a nose guard turned quarterback until he quit in order to concentrate on baseball. As a senior, he hit for a .535/.673/1.253 slash line with 14 home runs in 26 games. Undrafted out of high school in the 2016 Major League Baseball draft, he enrolled at North Carolina State University and played college baseball for the NC State Wolfpack.

In 2017, as a freshman at NC State playing primarily second base, Wilson started all 61 games and batted .300/.377/.504 with 21 doubles (tied for the league lead; the second-highest total of any freshman in the nation), eight home runs, and 48 RBIs. He was named to the Atlantic Coast Conference (ACC) All-Freshman Team along with being named a Freshman All-American by D1Baseball and Collegiate Baseball Magazine. As a sophomore in 2018, playing shortstop he hit .307/.376/.588 with three triples, 15 home runs, and 53 RBIs in 59 games. During the season, he was named ACC Player of the Week three times, which set an NC State record. He was also named to the All-ACC First Team. After the season, he played for the United States collegiate national team. He hit .208 in 10 games for the U.S.

Prior to the 2019 season, Wilson was named a preseason All-American by multiple media outlets including Baseball America and Collegiate Baseball Newspaper. He was named the ACC Defender of the Year along with being named to the All ACC-First Team for the second consecutive year. He played shortstop and finished the season slashing .339/.425/.665 with 20 doubles, 16 home runs, and 57 RBIs in 55 games.

== Professional career ==
=== Los Angeles Angels ===
Wilson was considered one of the top prospects for the 2019 Major League Baseball draft. He was selected by the Los Angeles Angels with the 15th overall selection. He signed with the Angels on June 10 for a signing bonus of $3.4 million. He made his professional debut with the Orem Owlz of the Rookie Advanced Pioneer League. Over 46 games, he slashed .275/.328/.439 in 189 at bats with 23 runs, five home runs, and 18 RBIs.

=== San Francisco Giants ===
On December 10, 2019, Wilson and Zack Cozart were traded to the San Francisco Giants for a player to be named later or cash considerations. Wilson did not play in a game in 2020 due to the cancellation of the minor league season because of the COVID-19 pandemic.

To begin 2021, Wilson was assigned to the Eugene Emeralds of the High-A West. After slashing .251/.339/.497 in 195 at bats with 37 runs, ten home runs, and 26 RBI over 49 games, he was promoted to the Richmond Flying Squirrels of the Double-A Northeast in early July. Over 51 games with Richmond, Wilson batted .189/.281/.306 in 196 at-bats with five home runs and 22 RBI. He was selected to play in the Arizona Fall League for the Scottsdale Scorpions after the season.

Wilson returned to Richmond to begin the 2022 season. In mid-May, he was promoted to the Sacramento River Cats of the Triple-A Pacific Coast League, but he was sent down to Richmond in late August. He missed time during the season due to injury and rehabbed with the Rookie-level Arizona Complex League Giants. Over a combined 71 games played for the three affiliates, he hit .250/.346/.452 in 252 at bats with 43 runs, 13 home runs, and 38 RBI.

Wilson spent the 2023 campaign split between Richmond and Sacramento, playing in 128 games and batting .228/.295/.391 with career-highs in home runs (18) and RBI (66). He split 2024 between Richmond and Sacramento as well, making 110 appearances and slashing .216/.299/.296 with five home runs, 45 RBI, and six stolen bases.

=== Cleveland Guardians ===
On December 11, 2024, the Cleveland Guardians selected Wilson in the minor league phase of the Rule 5 draft. He was assigned to the Triple-A Columbus Clippers, batting .324 with six home runs and 18 RBI across 18 games. On April 22, 2025, Wilson was selected to the 40-man roster and promoted to the major leagues for the first time. Wilson recorded his first major league hit the following day in the bottom of the ninth inning against the New York Yankees. He made 34 appearances for the Guardians during his rookie campaign, slashing .192/.267/.244 with two RBI and two stolen bases. On November 6, Wilson was removed from the 40-man roster. He rejected an outright assignment and elected free agency.

=== Seattle Mariners ===
On January 26, 2026, Wilson signed a minor league contract with the Seattle Mariners that included an invitation to spring training. He was assigned to the Triple-A Tacoma Rainiers to begin the regular season. On April 20, the Mariners added Wilson to their active roster. In his Mariners debut on April 25, he hit his first career home run off of Matthew Liberatore in a win over the St. Louis Cardinals. Shortly thereafter, Wilson suffered a broken left thumb; he was transferred to the 60-day injured list on June 16. On November 2, Wilson was removed from the 40–man roster and elected free agency.

== Personal life ==
Wilson's mother played college softball for the Winthrop Eagles. Wilson earned his finance degree from NC State in three years.

Wilson is married. College teammate Patrick Bailey was a groomsman in his wedding, and Wilson was a groomsman in Bailey's wedding.

== See also ==
- Rule 5 draft results
