= Margrace Mill Village Historic District =

Historic district in North Carolina, United States

- U.S. National Register of Historic Places
- U.S. Historic district
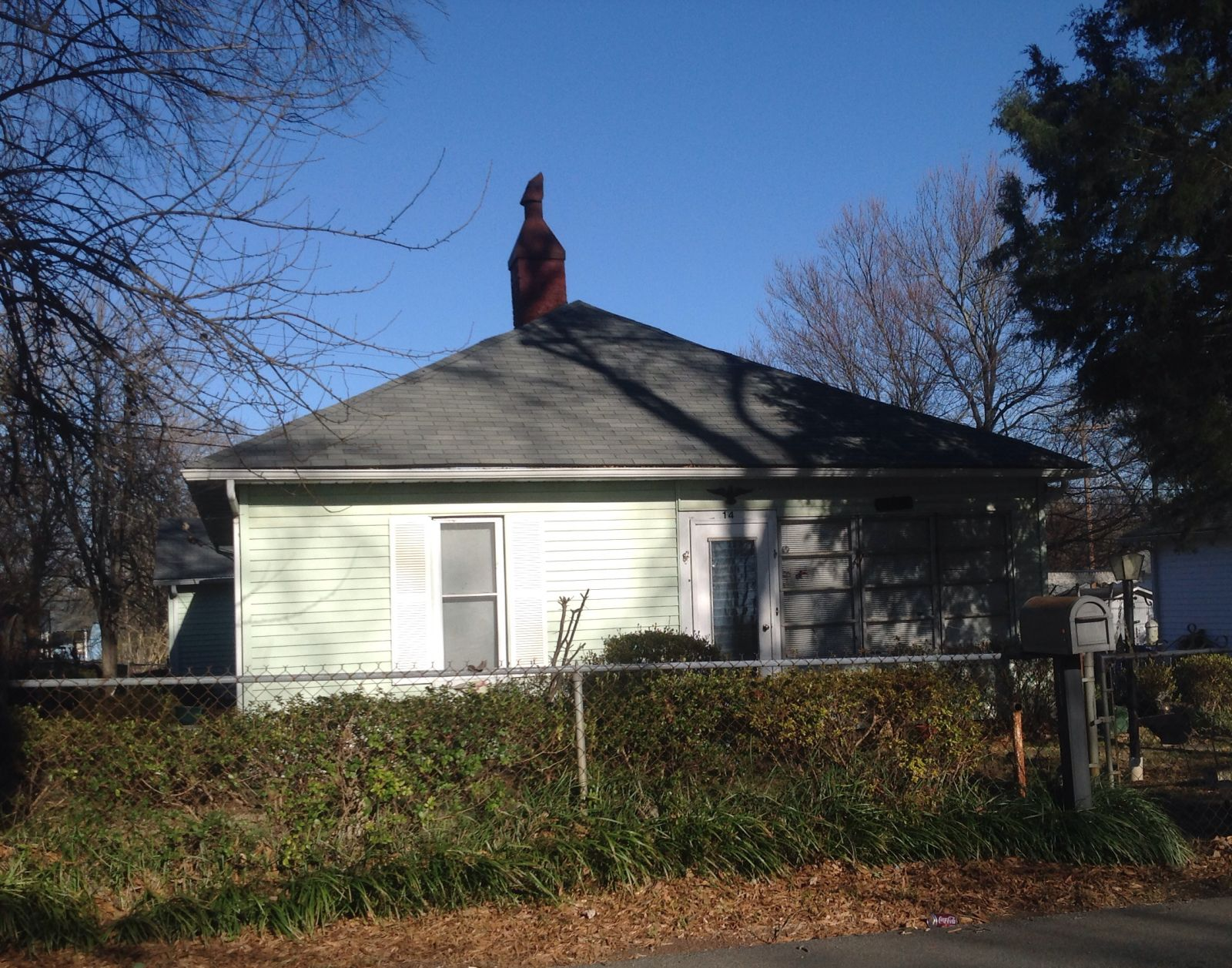
- 114 Fulton Drive

- Location within North Carolina Location within the United States
- Location: 101-117, 102-120 Cloninger St., 101-113, 102-116, 200 Fulton Dr., 145 Ark St., 101-107, 102-114 Water Oak St., Kings Mountain, North Carolina
- Coordinates: 35°13′29″N 81°21′44″W
- Area: 9.6 acres (3.9 ha)
- Built: 1919
- Architectural style: Bungalow/craftsman, one-story mill house
- NRHP reference No.: 09000288
- Added to NRHP: May 6, 2009

Margrace Mill Village Historic District is a national historic district located at Kings Mountain, Cleveland County, North Carolina. It encompasses 57 contributing buildings in a residential section of Kings Mountain. The houses date between about 1919 and 1956, and characterized by one-story frame mill houses. All of the principal resources in the district were erected by the Neisler family textile company and housed employees of the nearby Margrace and Patricia mills. Notable nonresidential buildings are the Margrace Mill Clubhouse (c. 1933) and Margrace Mill Company Store.

It was listed on the National Register of Historic Places in 2009.
