= Skeen's Mill Covered Bridge =

- U.S. National Register of Historic Places
- Location within North Carolina Location within the United States
- Location: 1.7 miles west of Flint Hill on SR 1406 off SR 1408, Flint Hill, North Carolina
- Coordinates: 35°45′56″N 79°59′34″W
- Area: 2 acres (0.81 ha)
- Built: c. 1885-1900
- Architectural style: Town lattice-truss/queenpost
- NRHP reference No.: 72000987
- Added to NRHP: January 20, 1972

Skeen's Mill Covered Bridge was a wooden covered bridge that spanned a branch of the Little Uwharrie River in Randolph County, North Carolina. It was built between about 1885 and 1900, and measured 100 feet long. The bridge had a combination of Ithiel Town lattice truss and queenpost truss construction. It had a gable roof and board-and-batten siding. It has been demolished.

It was added to the National Register of Historic Places in 1972.
