= King Street Overhead Bridge =

- U.S. National Register of Historic Places
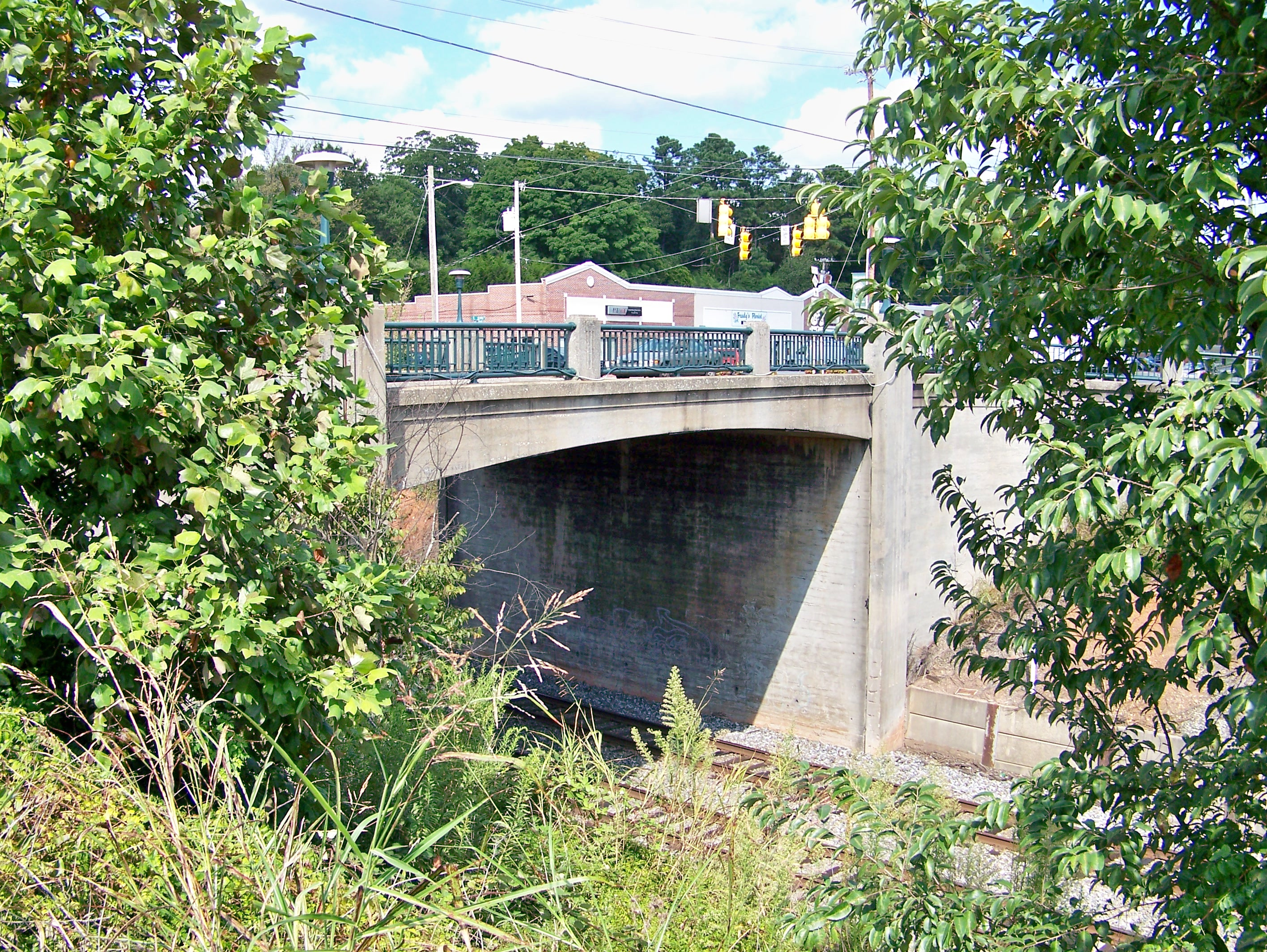

- Location within North Carolina Location within the United States
- Location: King St. Bet. Battleground and Railroad Aves., Kings Mountain, North Carolina
- Coordinates: 35°14′27″N 81°20′41″W
- Area: less than one acre
- Built: 1938-1939
- Built by: Craven, William L.; et.al.
- Architectural style: Rigid-frame bridge
- NRHP reference No.: 05000268
- Added to NRHP: April 6, 2005

King Street Overhead Bridge is a historic overhead bridge located at Kings Mountain, North Carolina. It was built in 1938–1939, and is a reinforced concrete Moderne-style rigid-frame vehicular bridge. It measures about 48 feet long and 49 feet wide and carries West King Street (US 74 Business Route) over the Norfolk Southern Railway railroad tracks of the Charlotte District.

It was listed on the National Register of Historic Places in 2005.

== See also ==
- Southern Railway Company Overhead Bridge
