= Hunting Creek Railroad Bridge =

- U.S. National Register of Historic Places
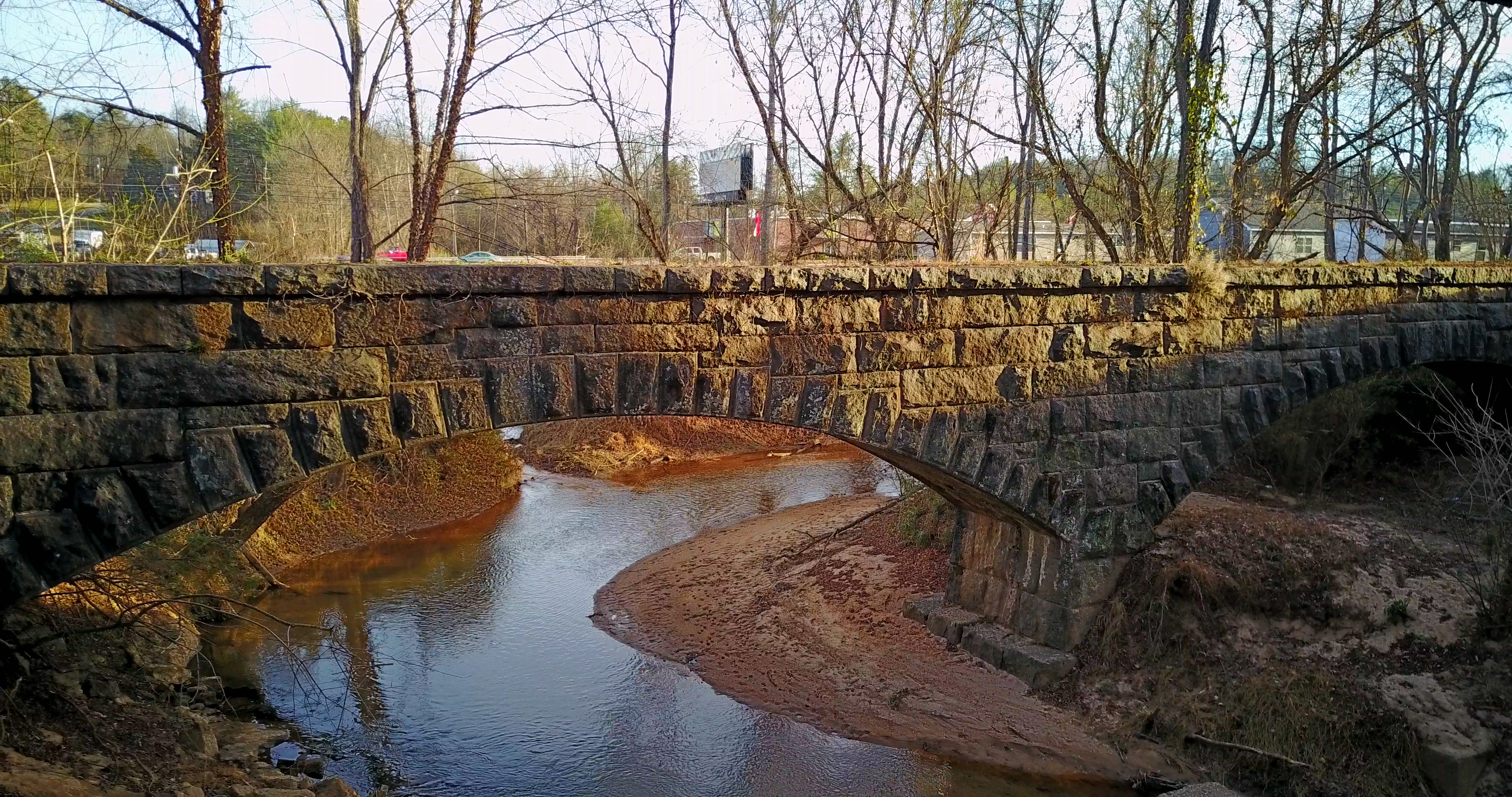

- Location within North Carolina Location within the United States
- Location: Hunting Creek N of US 64 & 70 between jct. of Stonebridge Rd. & E. Union St., Morganton, North Carolina
- Coordinates: 35°45′5″N 81°39′31″W
- Area: 0.1 acres (0.040 ha)
- Built: c. 1860
- MPS: Morganton MRA
- NRHP reference No.: 87001923
- Added to NRHP: November 9, 1987

Hunting Creek Railroad Bridge is a historic stone railroad bridge located at Morganton, Burke County, North Carolina. It was built about 1860, and is a two-span, stone arch bridge. It measures 130 feet long and stands about 24 feet above the creek. It was replaced by another bridge by at least 1890.

It was listed on the National Register of Historic Places in 1987.
