= Southern Railway Company Overhead Bridge =

- U.S. National Register of Historic Places
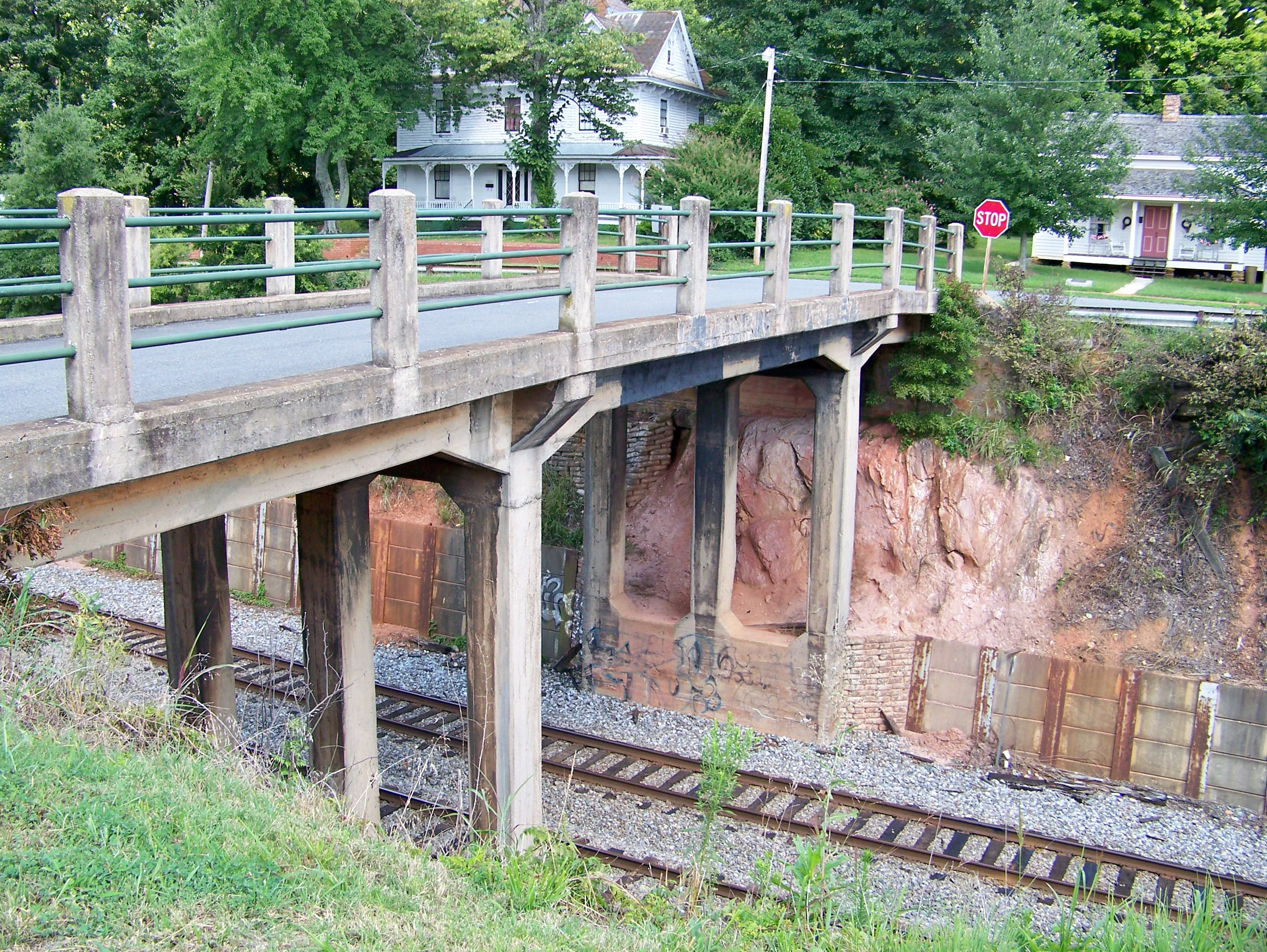

- Location within North Carolina Location within the United States
- Location: Spanning the double tracks on the Norfolk Southern RR bet. Battleground and Railroad Aves., 1/2 blk N of King St., Kings Mountain, North Carolina
- Coordinates: 35°14′29″N 81°20′41″W
- Area: 1 acre (0.40 ha)
- Built: 1919
- Architect: Southern Railway District Engineer
- Architectural style: T-beam
- NRHP reference No.: 07000351
- Added to NRHP: April 19, 2007

Southern Railway Company Overhead Bridge, also known as North Carolina Bridge #220426, is a historic overhead bridge located at Kings Mountain, Cleveland County, North Carolina. It was built in 1919, and is a reinforced concrete tee-beam vehicular bridge. It measures about 80 feet long and 18 feet, 7 1/2 inches, wide and goes over the Norfolk Southern Railway's railroad tracks of the Charlotte District.

It was listed on the National Register of Historic Places in 2007.

== See also ==
- King Street Overhead Bridge
