= Scuppernong River Bridge =

- U.S. National Register of Historic Places
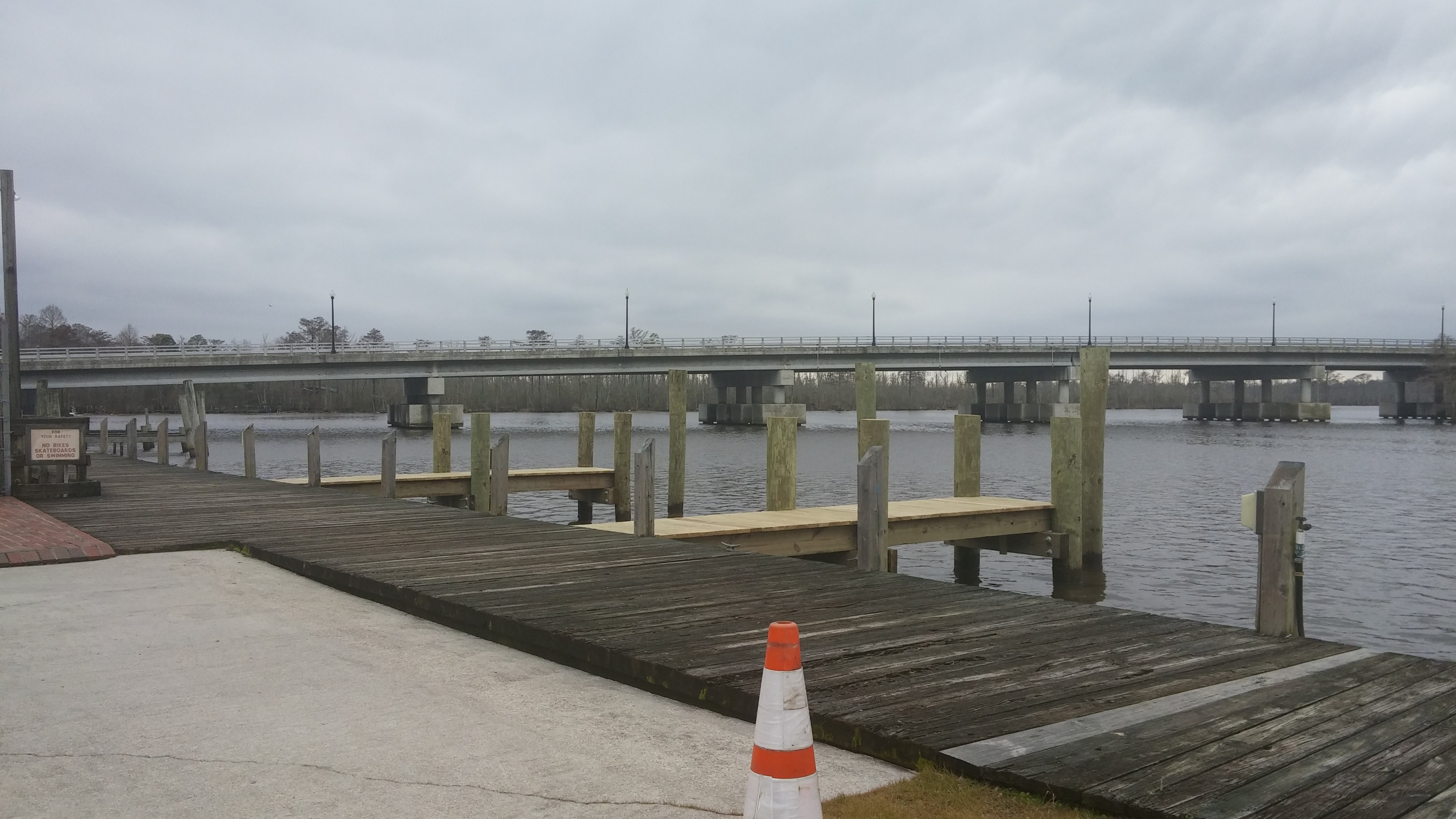
- Scuppernong River Bridge, March 2015

- Location within North Carolina Location within the United States
- Location: US 64 Bus. across the Scuppernong R., Columbia, North Carolina
- Coordinates: 35°55′2″N 76°15′19″W
- Area: less than one acre
- Built: 1926
- Built by: NC State Highway Commission
- Architectural style: Warren ponytruss swing span
- NRHP reference No.: 92000078
- Added to NRHP: March 5, 1992

Scuppernong River Bridge, also known as the Main Street Bridge, Tyrrell County No. 4 Bridge, and Columbia Bridge, is a historic bridge located at Columbia, Tyrrell County, North Carolina. It was built in 1926, and is a 566-foot-long, two-lane bridge. Spanning the Scuppernong River, it consists of a steel Warren-type pony truss swing span measuring 123 feet long, and 22 concrete pile-supported timber approach spans. It is the only manually operated pony truss swing-span bridge remaining in North Carolina.

It was listed on the National Register of Historic Places in 1992.
