= Calvin Stephens =

American football offensive lineman (1967–2010)

No. 63
- Position: Guard

Personal information
- Born: October 25, 1967; Kings Mountain, North Carolina, U.S.
- Died: June 8, 2010 (aged 42); Mount Holly, North Carolina, U.S.
- Listed height: 6 ft 3 in (1.91 m)
- Listed weight: 320 lb (145 kg)

Career information
- High school: Kings Mountain
- College: South Carolina
- NFL draft: 1991: 3rd round, 56th overall pick

Career history
- New England Patriots (1991–1993)

Career NFL statistics
- Games played: 13
- Games started: 1
- Stats at Pro Football Reference

Calvin Herbert Stephens (October 25, 1967 – June 8, 2010) was an American professional football offensive guard who played in the National Football League (NFL) for the New England Patriots. He played college football at the University of South Carolina.

== Early life and college ==
Stephens was born in Kings Mountain, North Carolina. He attended Kings Mountain High School, where he played both offensive and defensive line, earning all-state honors and lettering in track and wrestling.

He played college football at the University of South Carolina, where he was a four-year letterman and three-year starter at offensive guard. In his senior year (1990), he earned honorable mention All-America honors from Football News and was named South Carolina's Outstanding Player of the Year. He started 39 games in his college career and did not allow a sack in his senior season.

== Professional career ==
Stephens was selected by the New England Patriots in the third round (56th overall) of the 1991 NFL draft.

During training camp of his rookie year in 1991, Stephens tore his triceps muscle and spent the entire season on the injured reserve list. He returned for the 1992 season, appearing in 13 games and starting once. The Patriots released him in August 1993 during roster cutdowns. He was briefly claimed off waivers by the San Diego Chargers later that month but was released before the start of the regular season.

== Personal life ==
Stephens majored in criminal justice at the University of South Carolina. He was known by his teammates for his strength, reportedly bench-pressing over 500 pounds, and was described by them as a “gentle giant” both on and off the field.

He died on June 8, 2010, in Mount Holly, North Carolina, at age 42.

== Legacy ==
Though his professional career was brief, Stephens is remembered in his hometown of Kings Mountain and among South Carolina Gamecocks fans as a blocker who inspired teammates through his perseverance and quiet leadership.
