= Kings Mountain, North Carolina =

- City
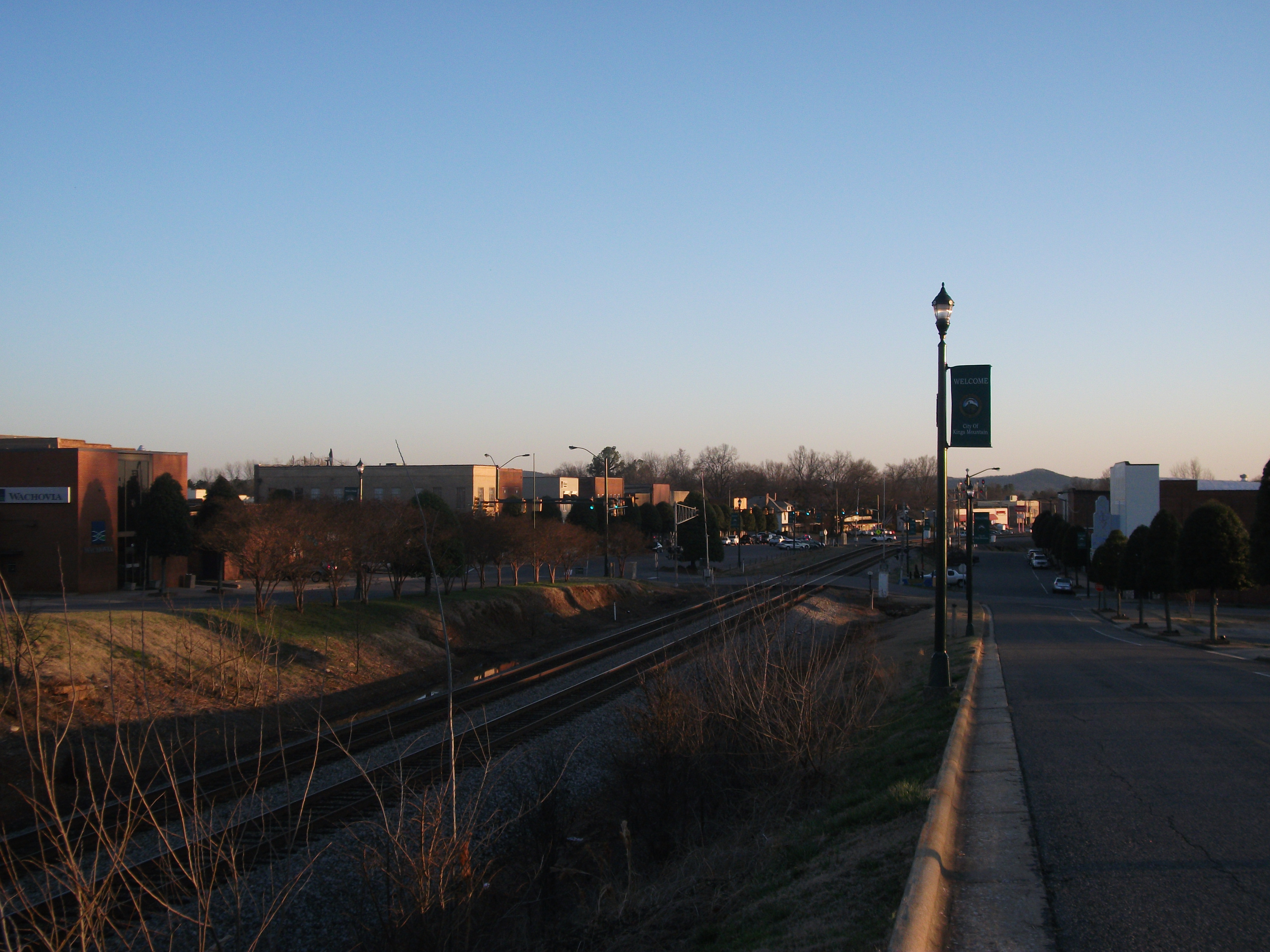
- Downtown along Battleground Avenue

- Icon
- Motto: The Historical City
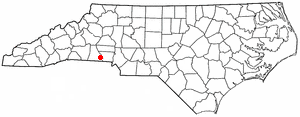
- Location of Kings Mountain, North Carolina
- Coordinates: 35°14′04″N 81°21′00″W
- Country: United States
- State: North Carolina
- County: Cleveland, Gaston

Government
  - Type: Council-Manager

Area
  - Total: 13.97 sq mi (36.19 km^{2})
  - Land: 13.76 sq mi (35.65 km^{2})
  - Water: 0.21 sq mi (0.54 km^{2})
- Elevation: 951 ft (290 m)

Population (2020)
  - Total: 11,142
  - Density: 809.5/sq mi (312.55/km^{2})
- Time zone: UTC−5 (Eastern (EST))
  - Summer (DST): UTC−4 (EDT)
- ZIP Code: 28086
- Area code: 704
- FIPS code: 37-35880
- GNIS feature ID: 2404831
- Website: www.cityofkm.com

Kings Mountain is a small suburban city within the Charlotte metropolitan area in Cleveland and Gaston counties, North Carolina, United States. Most of the city is in Cleveland County, with a small eastern portion in Gaston County. As of the 2020 census, Kings Mountain had a population of 11,142.

== History ==
Originally the settlement was called White Plains, but the city was incorporated on October 16, 1874, and the name was changed. It was decided that "Kings Mountain" would be a more appropriate name since the community was close to the site of the historic 1780 Battle of Kings Mountain in York County, South Carolina, a turning point in the American Revolutionary War.

The Battle of Kings Mountain was proclaimed as "the turning point of the American Revolution" by Thomas Jefferson. Liberty Mountain, a play performed at the local theater, recounts the events of the battle. The downtown area is home to the Kings Mountain Historical Museum, police station, and the Mauney Memorial Library.

The Central School Historic District, King Street Overhead Bridge, Margrace Mill Village Historic District, Jacob S. Mauney Memorial Library and Teacher's Home, Southern Railway Company Overhead Bridge, and West End Historic District are listed on the National Register of Historic Places.

== Geography ==
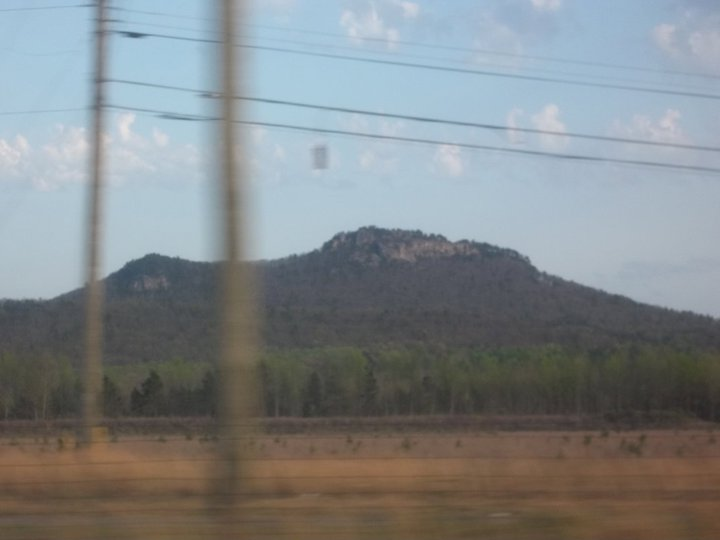
King's Pinnacle

Kings Mountain lies 30 miles (48 km) west of Charlotte along Interstate 85. Gaffney, South Carolina, is 21 miles (34 km) to the southwest along I-85.

According to the United States Census Bureau, the city has a total area of 12.6 square miles (32.6 km^{2}), of which 12.3 square miles (31.9 km^{2}) is land and 0.23 square miles (0.6 km^{2}), or 1.98%, is covered with water.

Kings Pinnacle is a small mountain located at the southeastern point of the city. Standing at 1,705 feet, it is the highest point in the Kings Mountain Belt of monadnock formations. It is one of the two mountains in Crowders Mountain State Park, where cleared trails lead to the pinnacle.

== Demographics ==
Historical population
Census	Pop.	Note	%±
1880	337		—
1890	429		27.3%
1900	2,062		380.7%
1910	2,218		7.6%
1920	2,800		26.2%
1930	5,632		101.1%
1940	6,547		16.2%
1950	7,206		10.1%
1960	8,008		11.1%
1970	8,465		5.7%
1980	9,080		7.3%
1990	8,763		−3.5%
2000	9,693		10.6%
2010	10,296		6.2%
2020	11,142		8.2%
2025 (est.)	12,117	▲	8.8%
U.S. Decennial Census

=== 2020 census ===
As of the 2020 census, Kings Mountain had a population of 11,142. The median age was 40.2 years. 23.2% of residents were under the age of 18 and 18.0% were 65 years of age or older. For every 100 females, there were 85.8 males, and for every 100 females age 18 and over, there were 82.6 males.

96.3% of residents lived in urban areas, while 3.7% lived in rural areas.

There were 4,490 households, including 2,536 families. Of households, 31.9% had children under the age of 18 living in them. Among family households, 40.7% were married-couple households, 17.7% had a male householder with no spouse or partner present, and 35.1% had a female householder with no spouse or partner present. About 29.3% of all households were made up of individuals, and 13.4% had someone living alone who was 65 years of age or older.

There were 4,883 housing units, of which 8.0% were vacant. The homeowner vacancy rate was 1.2%, and the rental vacancy rate was 5.8%.

Kings Mountain racial composition
Race	Number	Percentage
White (non-Hispanic)	7,457	66.93%
Black or African American (non-Hispanic)	2,543	22.82%
Native American	30	0.27%
Asian	162	1.45%
Pacific Islander	1	0.01%
Other/Mixed	510	4.58%
Hispanic or Latino	439	3.94%

=== 2010 census ===
As of the census of 2010, there were 10,296 people, 4,597 households, and 2,674 families residing in the city. The population density was 1,187.1 inhabitants per square mile (458.3/km^{2}). There were 4,064 housing units at an average density of 497.7 units per square mile (192.2 units/km^{2}). The racial makeup of the city was 74.85% White, 21.55% black, 0.15% Native American, 1.81% Asian, 0.02% Pacific Islander, 0.63% from other races, and 0.99% from two or more races. Hispanic or Latino of any race were 1.43% of the population.

There were 3,821 households, out of which 30.7% had children under the age of 18 living with them, 49.4% were married couples living together, 17.2% had a female householder with no husband present, and 30.0% were non-families. Of all households, 26.8% were made up of individuals, and 12.6% had someone living alone who was 65 years of age or older. The average household size was 2.47 and the average family size was 2.98.

In the city, the population was spread out, with 25.3% under the age of 18, 7.4% from 18 to 24, 27.3% from 25 to 44, 22.4% from 45 to 64, and 17.6% who were 65 years of age or older. The median age was 38 years. For every 100 females, there were 85.9 males. For every 100 females age 18 and over, there were 80.4 males.

The median income for a household in the city was $31,415, and the median income for a family was $39,137. Males had a median income of $32,444 versus $22,201 for females. The per capita income for the city was $15,920. About 13.4% of families and 19.2% of the population were below the poverty line, including 29.2% of those under age 18 and 20.7% of those age 65 or over.

== Transportation ==
The interchange between Interstate 85, US Highway 74, and US Highway 29 is to the east of the city.

Kings Mountain is also served by two North Carolina State Highways: NC-161 with service to Bessemer City and York, and NC-216 with service to Cherryville.

Greyhound Lines began scheduled intercity bus service on April 20, 2010. The station is housed at Battleground Petroleum, 726 York Rd., off Interstate 85. The close proximity to I-85 was a major factor in relocating this station from nearby Gastonia, North Carolina.

== Education ==
The portion in Cleveland County, the majority of the municipality, is in the Cleveland County Schools school district. Kings Mountain High School is a part of this district.

The portion in Gaston County is in the Gaston County Schools school district.

== Notable people ==
- Thelma Davidson Adair (1920–2024), was an American educator, Presbyterian church leader, advocate for human rights, peace and justice issues, writer and activist
- George Adams (born 1949), professional basketball player
- Otto Briggs (1891–1943), former professional baseball player
- Dremiel Byers (born 1974), Greco-Roman wrestler, World Champion and part of two Olympic teams in 2008 and 2012
- Glenn Dunaway (1916–1964), was a former NASCAR driver
- Jake Early (1915–1985), former MLB player and All-Star selection
- Kevin Mack (born 1962), former NFL fullback and two-time Pro Bowl selection
- Tim Moore (born 1970), NC Speaker of the House (2015-2025), U.S. Representative from NC-14
- John Henry Moss (1919–2009), Minor League Baseball executive and longtime Mayor of Kings Mountain
- Laura Moss (born 1973), actress
- Frazier Robinson (born 1910), former professional baseball player
- Madisyn Shipman (born 2002), actress in Game Shakers
- Freddy Smith (1946–2023), known as "The Southern Gentleman," Smith amassed 785 career victories and five Dirt Track World Championship titles, making him one of the most successful drivers in the sport's history
- Calvin Stephens (1967–2010), former NFL offensive guard with New England Patriots
- Sandor Teszler (1903–2000), textile executive and philanthropist
- Jimmy Wayne (born 1972), country music singer and songwriter
- George Wilson (1924–1974), former MLB player and a member of 1956 New York Yankees World Series champion
- Will Wilson (born 1998), MLB infielder
- Mustafa Saed (born 1963), former Professional wrestler

== See also ==
- Battle of Kings Mountain
- Indian Motocycle Manufacturing Company
- Kings Mountain National Military Park
- Lincoln Academy
- Parker Hannifin
