= Ellenboro, North Carolina =

- Town
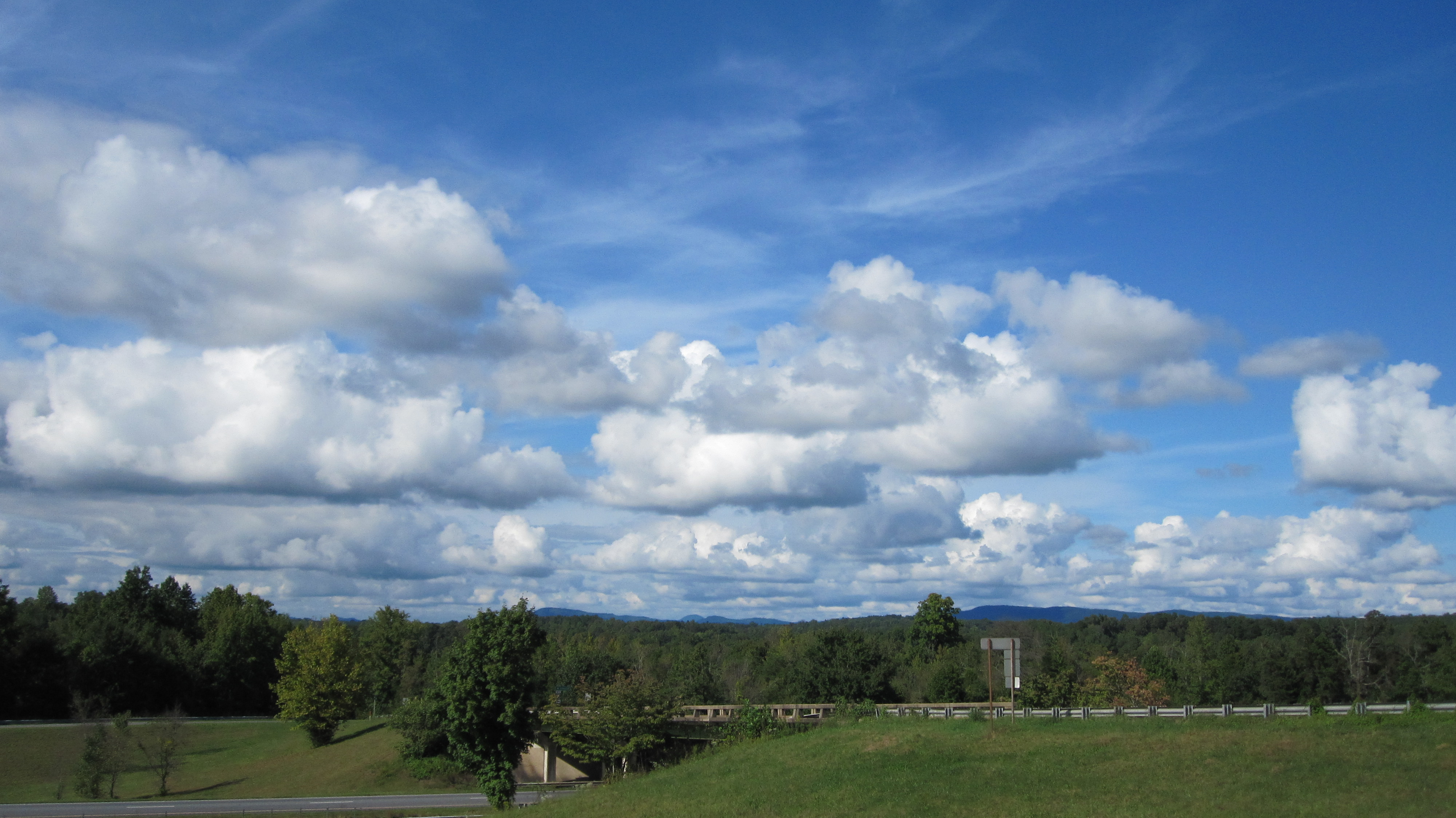
- Ellenboro Right of U.S. 74 Hwy
- Nickname: The Boro
- Motto: Small Town Friendly
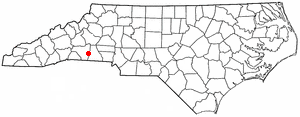
- Location of Ellenboro, North Carolina
- Coordinates: 35°19′51″N 81°45′41″W
- Country: United States
- State: North Carolina
- County: Rutherford

Area
  - Total: 1.27 sq mi (3.28 km^{2})
  - Land: 1.27 sq mi (3.28 km^{2})
  - Water: 0 sq mi (0.00 km^{2})
- Elevation: 1,040 ft (320 m)

Population (2020)
  - Total: 723
  - Density: 571.5/sq mi (220.64/km^{2})
- Time zone: UTC-5 (Eastern (EST))
  - Summer (DST): UTC-4 (EDT)
- ZIP code: 28040
- Area code: 828
- FIPS code: 37-20780
- GNIS feature ID: 2406439
- Website: https://ellenboronc.info/

Ellenboro is a town in Rutherford County, North Carolina, United States. The population was 723 at the 2020 census.

== Geography ==
According to the United States Census Bureau, the town has a total area of 0.9 square miles (2.3 km^{2}), all land.

== Demographics ==
Historical population
Census	Pop.	Note	%±
1900	172		—
1910	293		70.3%
1920	333		13.7%
1930	431		29.4%
1940	471		9.3%
1950	537		14.0%
1960	492		−8.4%
1970	465		−5.5%
1980	560		20.4%
1990	514		−8.2%
2000	479		−6.8%
2010	873		82.3%
2020	723		−17.2%
U.S. Decennial Census

As of the census of 2000, there were 479 people, 2 households, and 12 families residing in the town. The population density was 513.6 inhabitants per square mile (198.3/km^{2}). There were 251 housing units at an average density of 269.1 per square mile (103.9/km^{2}). The racial makeup of the town was 82.46% White, 16.91% African American, 0.21% Native American, and 0.42% from two or more races. Hispanic or Latino of any race were 0.84% of the population.

There were 222 households, out of which 25.7% had children under the age of 18 living with them, 39.2% were married couples living together, 13.5% had a female householder with no husband present, and 43.2% were non-families. 37.8% of all households were made up of individuals, and 13.1% had someone living alone who was 65 years of age or older. The average household size was 2.16 and the average family size was 2.85.

In the town, the population was spread out, with 21.5% under the age of 18, 10.6% from 18 to 24, 27.6% from 25 to 44, 27.6% from 45 to 64, and 12.7% who were 65 years of age or older. The median age was 38 years. For every 100 females, there were 92.4 males. For every 100 females age 18 and over, there were 92.8 males.

The median income for a household in the town was $31,429, and the median income for a family was $37,083. Males had a median income of $27,500 versus $21,042 for females. The per capita income for the town was $16,472. About 10.3% of families and 12.1% of the population were below the poverty line, including 10.3% of those under age 18 and 34.1% of those age 65 or over.

== History ==
Ellenboro is a town in Rutherford County.

In 1880, the Seaboard Air Line Railroad built a line from Wilmington to Rutherfordton. At the highest point on that line, the town of Ellenboro sprang up. In 1884, as the community of 179 people was trying to decide on a name for the town, Seaboard engineer John Robinson proposed that it be named for his daughter, Ellen, who was dying of a fever. In return, Robinson donated a large brass bell to the town. The bell hung for many years in the school, but disappeared some time after a new school building was built.

In those early days, the most important social event of the year was held in early July and was known as "Big Days." Big Days celebrations drew crowds from miles around (as pictured above in a turn of the century photo, showing a prize-winning wagon load of revelers). The festivities included a steam-powered merry-go-round, sack races, foot races, minstrel shows, side shows, produce sales, and lemonade dipped from zinc tubs.

In 1928, a young agriculture teacher at Ellenboro School, A.B. Bushong, organized the first Colfax Free Fair held in early fall on the school grounds, providing an opportunity for farmers and homemakers to display their best efforts of the year: canned and baked goods, crops, and handicrafts. Students also proudly exhibited their work competing for ribbons. Beauty and baby contests were held. A major part of the fair (especially for the children) was the rides provided every year by Lee Rides. Over the years, the fair, still held every September, has become a time for former students and Ellenboro residents who may have moved away to come home and visit with friends and to catch up on the year's news.
