= David Key (American football) =

American gridiron football player (born 1968)

No. 26
- Position: Defensive back

Personal information
- Born: March 27, 1968 (age 58); Columbus, Ohio, U.S.
- Listed height: 5 ft 10 in (1.78 m)
- Listed weight: 190 lb (86 kg)

Career information
- High school: Bishop Hartley (Columbus)
- College: Michigan
- NFL draft: 1991: 6th round, 140th overall pick

Career history
- New England Patriots (1991)

Career NFL statistics
- Fumble recoveries: 1
- Stats at Pro Football Reference

David Russell Key (born March 27, 1968) is an American former professional football player who was a defensive back for the New England Patriots of the National Football League (NFL). He played college football for the Michigan Wolverines from 1987 to 1990 and in the NFL for the Patriots in 1991.

== Early life ==
Key was born in Columbus, Ohio, in 1968. He attended Bishop Hartley High School in Columbus. He played football at Hartley and led the team to the Division IV state championship game in 1985. He also was a member of the track team and led the team to Division II state titles in 1985 and 1986.

== University of Michigan ==
Key enrolled at the University of Michigan in 1986 and played college football as a defensive back for head coach Bo Schembechler's Wolverines football teams from 1987 to 1989 and for Gary Moeller's team in 1990. He started 36 consecutive games at the cornerback position for Michigan from 1988 to 1990. Over his four years at Michigan, he had 166 tackles, eight fumble recoveries, seven pass breakups, and two interceptions.

== Professional football ==
Key was selected by the New England Patriots in the sixth round (140th overall pick) of the 1991 NFL draft and appeared in three games for the Patriots during the 1991 NFL season.
