= Gardner–Webb Runnin' Bulldogs =

Collegiate sports club in the United States

- University: Gardner–Webb University
- Nickname: Runnin' Bulldogs
- NCAA: Division I (FCS)
- Conference: Big South Conference (primary); OVC (football); SoCon (men's wrestling); ASUN (swimming & diving); MEAC (women's flag football)
- Athletic director: Brendan Michael Fahey
- Location: Boiling Springs, North Carolina
- Varsity teams: 23
- Football stadium: Ernest W. Spangler Stadium
- Basketball arena: Paul Porter Arena
- Baseball stadium: John Henry Moss Stadium
- Softball stadium: Brinkley Softball Stadium
- Soccer stadium: Greene–Harbison Stadium
- Volleyball arena: Paul Porter Arena
- Colors: Red and black
- Mascot: Mac the Bulldog
- Website: gwusports.com/index.aspx

The Gardner–Webb Runnin' Bulldogs are the athletic teams that represent Gardner–Webb University, located in Boiling Springs, North Carolina. Gardner–Webb participates in 22 varsity sports at the NCAA Division I level, plus one varsity sport not governed by the NCAA. Most of the school's programs are a part of the Big South Conference. Known as the Bulldogs going back to 1922, costumed mascots, registered athletic marks and Gardner-Webb University live mascots have all been featured.

Athletic marks have been rebranded on at least three occasions. A hand-drawn mark was used in different variations between the 1960s–1980s. In 1987, a new logo was launched featuring a runnin' bulldog with a red jersey and arched lettering (representing the historic landmark -Huggins Memorial Arch). The initial design used the letters GWC (Gardner-Webb College). In 1993, that was changed to GWU, when Gardner-Webb gained "university" status. In April 2022, after eight-months of research and integration, the university launched its current mark, which serves as both a tribute to previous logos and a companion piece to the school's live mascot "Bo."

Gardner–Webb has also produced many notable athletes and coaches, including: Artis Gilmore, Gerry Vaillancourt, John Drew, Eddie Lee Wilkins, Jim Washburn, Blake Lalli, Jim Maxwell, Gabe Wilkins, Cara Saunders, and Brian Johnston.

== Sponsored sports ==
A member of the Big South Conference, Gardner-Webb sponsors teams in 10 men's and 12 women's NCAA-sanctioned sports, plus one women's sport not governed by the NCAA. In sports not sponsored by the Big South, football competes in the Ohio Valley Conference, women's flag football in the Mid-Eastern Athletic Conference, swimming & diving in the Atlantic Sun Conference, and men's wrestling in the Southern Conference. Cheerleading competes outside the NCAA structure.

Men's sports	Women's sports
Baseball	Acrobatics & tumbling
Basketball	Basketball
Cross country	Cheerleading (Note: Not governed by the NCAA.)
Football	Cross country
Golf	Flag football (Note: Currently part of the NCAA Emerging Sports for Women program; expected to become an NCAA championship sport in 2027–28.)
Soccer	Golf
Swimming & diving	Lacrosse
Tennis	Soccer
Track and field^{†}	Softball
Wrestling	Swimming & diving
	Tennis
	Track and field^{†}
	Volleyball
† – Track and field includes both indoor and outdoor

=== Baseball ===
Head coach: Jim Chester

Rusty Stroupe was the coach of the Runnin' Bulldogs for 17 years. He graduated from Appalachian State University in 1986. Stroupe accumulated over 800 wins as a college coach and is the all-time winningest baseball coach in Gardner–Webb history. Stroupe was awarded the prestigious Jerry Kindall Character in Coaching Award for 2012 by the Fellowship of Christian Athletes. He received the award at the FCA Breakfast at the ABCA Convention in January 2013.

Notable players to come from the Diamond Dogs

- Sam Bradford was a 22nd round draft pick Seattle Mariners in 2003.
- Jeff Long was a 10th round draft pick for the Atlanta Braves in 2004.
- Joey Siak signed as a Free Agent with the St. Louis Cardinals in 2004.
- Zach Ward was a 3rd round draft pick for the Cincinnati Reds in 2005.
- Blake Lalli was a fifth year Senior signee for the Chicago Cubs in 2006 and reached the major leagues in May, 2012.
- Adam Bullard was the 43rd draft pick for the Atlanta Braves in 2008.
- Andrew Barnett was signed by the Texas Rangers in 2014.
- Jeremy Walker was a 5th round draft pick for the Atlanta Braves in 2016.
- Brad Haymes was a 17th round draft pick for the Chicago White Sox in 2016.
- Ryan Boelter was a 33rd round draft pick for the Chicago White Sox in 2016.

=== Men's basketball ===
Head coach: Jeremy Luther

Associate Head Coach: Jake Delaney

Assistant coaches: Christian Turner, Adam Sweeney, and Tannor Kraus

The Gardner–Webb men's basketball team has had notable success against some of the best teams in college basketball. Gardner-Webb has been featured on ESPN because of their games against teams such as Duke, UNC, Virginia Tech, and Oklahoma. They defeated Kentucky in their 2007–2008 campaign in the Coaches vs. Cancer Classic, considered by many, one of the greatest regular season upsets ever, and gaining them recognition from Dick Vitale.

In their 2014–2015 season, the Runnin' Bulldogs set history, beating both Clemson and Purdue on their way to a 20 win season. Their 12–2 home record was the best in the state of North Carolina, beating out perennial powerhouses Duke, NC State, and UNC.

2018–2019 was one of the most successful seasons in school history where the team boasted an undefeated 13–0 home record as well as a 23–11 overall record that included wins against Georgia Tech and Wake Forest. Gardner-Webb topped off the season by winning the Big South Tournament and earning its first Division I tournament berth. The 2018–2019 season is the subject of the documentary The Dancin' Bulldogs released on October 16, 2020.

=== Women's basketball ===
Head coach: Alex Simmons

Assistant coaches: Garner Small, Chynna Turner, and Danielle Bell

Rick Reeves served as head coach for nine seasons. During this time he turned the program around from only five wins in the year previous to his arrival to two championship appearances in the Big South Tournament including their first year in the Big South Conference. Reeves, who had previously coached at Liberty and Southern Mississippi, faced Liberty in the championship losing by one point to the defending champions in 2008–2009 and losing by two in 2009–2010 before finally defeating them by one in 2010–2011, earning a bid to the NCAA tournament. The program also had their first ever winning season since moving to Division I, finishing 17–15 in 2008–2009. Gardner–Webb was also able to post a nine-game home winning streak in 2008–2009.

In 2009–2010, the program set school records in wins (28) and also tied a Big South Conference Record in wins. The team won its first conference title in the 35-year history of the program and made its first postseason appearance ever in the WNIT. The team also picked up a huge non-conference win at Purdue in 2009–2010.

Reeves coached with both his daughters at Gardner–Webb, Kim Clark and Krystal Reeves-Evans before the start of the 2010–2011 season, when Clark left to be an assistant at Middle Tennessee State.

Reeves left the program at the end of the 2017–2018 season and was replaced by Alex Simmons, an assistant coach from Ole Miss.

=== Cross country and track and field ===
Head coach: Brian Baker

Assistant coaches:

The Track and Field team won the A-Sun conference championship in their 2005–2006 season.

=== Football ===
Head coach: Cris Reisert

Assistant coaches: Tyler Johns (OL/Offensive Coordinator), Tim Cooper (Defensive Coordinator/Safeties), Pete Bennett (Special Teams Coordinator), Darius Pinnix (RB), Tyus Alcorn (WR), Payton Veraldi (QB/Co-Recruiting Coordinator), Dean Cullison (TE/Co-Recruiting Coordinator), MyQuon Stout (Defensive Line Coach), Steve Gardiner (Linebackers), Ty Holder (Cornerbacks/Pro Football Liaison), Sam Schroeder (Director of Athletic Performance), Davis Shanley (Graduate Assistant / Defense), Fred Proesel (Director of Football Operations/On-Campus Recruiting)

=== Golf ===
Head coach: Tee Burton

Assistant coach: Zack Byers

=== Women's Lacrosse ===
Head coach: Jessie Aguglia

Assistant coach: Racquel Prager, and Riley Hill

=== Men's soccer ===
Head coach: Scott Wells

Assistant coaches: Joe Barber, Jay O'Donnell, and Daniel Babbert

=== Women's soccer ===
Head coach: Mike Varga

Assistant coaches: Samantha Huecker

In the fall of 2006, the Gardner–Webb soccer team won its conference and made it to the NCAA second round.

In 2001, the Runnin' Bulldogs were the National Christian College Athletic Association national champions, following that tournament Mounce was named NCCAA National Women's Soccer Coach of the Year. In 2002, the Runnin' Bulldogs became a NCAA Division I program participating in the Atlantic Sun Conference. At the conclusion of their season, the team was ranked second in the nation for first-year division I programs by Soccer Buzz. In 2003 the Runnin' Bulldogs saw their first ever appearance in the Atlantic Sun Championship, finishing 5th in the league. For this accomplishment, former head coach Kevin Mounce was named A-Sun coach of the year. In 2004, GWU had a forward, Leeanna Woodworth who led the nation in scoring. She became A-Sun player of the year and broke many school records. In 2008, the team transferred to the Big South Conference. In their first year competing in the Big South they finished 4–12–2.

=== Softball ===
Head coach: Tom Cole

Assistant coaches: Angel Bunner

=== Swimming ===
Head coach: Mike Blum

Assistant coaches: Ashley Kaminski, Michael Southward

Gardner–Webb's swimming team competes in the Atlantic Sun conference since the Big South does not sponsor swimming.

In 2016, Nathan Lile became the first men's swimmer in program history to qualify for the NCAA Men's Division I Swimming and Diving Championships, earning a spot in the 50 Free and 100 Free.

Program history was made again in the summer of 2016. Gardner-Webb men, Nathan Lile and Connor Bos, made history by being the first GWU male swimmers to make the United States Olympic Time Trials in Omaha, NE. Both Connor and Nathan qualified in the 100M Backstroke, as Nathan also had qualifying cuts in the 50M Freestyle and 100M Butterfly.

In 2017, the Men's Swim Team placed second at the Coastal Collegiate Swimming Association conference meet, and the Women's Team Placed third overall.

In 2021, the Men's Swim Team made program history, and brought home their first-ever CCSA Team Conference Championship.

Following the 2022-2023 season, Gardner-Webb, along with a majority of the swim teams in the former CCSA, switched to competing in the ASUN conference.

=== Tennis ===
Head coaches: Mike Griffith (M) and Jim Corn (W)

=== Volleyball ===
Head coach: Alex Hinsey

Assistant coaches: Matt Hamilton & Ashleigh Nicoll

=== Wrestling ===
Head coach: Daniel Elliott

Assistant coaches: Cody Walters, Brendan Couture, Mack McGuire

Gardner–Webb's wrestling team competes in the Southern Conference since the Big South is a non-wrestling Conference.

== Championships ==
=== Team national championships ===
Sport	Association	Division	Year	Opponent/Runner-Up	Score
Women's soccer (1)	NCCAA	Single	2001	The Master's College	1–0
Men's golf (2)	NAIA	Single	1977	Sam Houston State	1190–1200
Men's golf (2)	NAIA	Single	1976	Elon	1193–1194
