= Gardner–Webb Runnin' Bulldogs wrestling =

Gardner–Webb Runnin' Bulldogs Wrestling
- University: Gardner–Webb University
- Head coach: Daniel Elliott (13th season)
- Conference: SoCon
- Location: Boiling Springs, NC
- Arena: Paul Porter Arena (capacity: 3,500)
- Nickname: Runnin' Bulldogs
- Colors: Red and black

All-Americans
- 2

Conference championships
- 2016

The Gardner–Webb Runnin' Bulldogs Wrestling team represents Gardner–Webb University of Boiling Springs, North Carolina. The team head coach is Daniel Elliott. The Runnin' Bulldogs are full members of the non-wrestling Big South Conference, with the wrestling team competing as an associate member of the Southern Conference (SoCon).

== History ==
The Gardner–Webb wrestling program started in 1989–90 season, by Coach Richard Wince. Wince headed the program from 1989–2007, and again from 2009–2012. During Wince's tenure, the Bulldogs had two wrestlers earn All-America honors at the NCAA Division II championships.

In 2000, Runnin' Bulldogs All-American wrestler James Short, became the first Gardner-Webb student athlete to compete at the U.S. Olympic trials, competing in Greco-Roman wrestling.

In 2001, Gardner–Webb transitioned to NCAA Division I. In 2012, as the program joined the Southern Conference, Wince was succeeded by his associate head coach and former Gardner–Webb wrestler, Daniel Elliott. In 2015, Elliott was named the SoCon Co-Coach of the Year.

In 2016, the Runnin’ Bulldogs qualified three wrestlers for the NCAA Championships and won a share of the regular season SoCon Conference Championship.

== NCAA Division I Wrestling Individual Conference Champions ==
East Region:

- 2004 Joshua Pniewski, 133 lbs.
- 2005 Joshua Pniewski, 133 lbs.
- 2005 Daniel Elliott, 149 lbs.
- 2006 Joshua Pniewski, 133 lbs.
- 2006 Daniel Elliott, 149 lbs.
- 2006 Adam Glaser, 157 lbs.
- 2006 Brent Blackwell, 197 lbs.
- 2007 Rob Tate, 133 lbs.
- 2007 Dustin Porter, 197 lbs.
- 2008 Dustin Porter, 197 lbs.
- 2009 Dustin Porter, 285 lbs.
- 2010 Dustin Porter, 285 lbs.
- 2012 Ryan Medved, 149 lbs.
- 2012 Alex Medved, 157 lbs.
- 2012 Jonathan Velazquez, 184 lbs.
- 2012 Travis Porter, 197 lbs.

Southern Conference:

- 2013 Hunter Gamble, 174 lbs.
- 2016 Austin Trott, 165 lbs.
- 2017 Ryan Mosley, 157 lbs.
- 2018 Tyler Marinelli, 157 lbs.
- 2019 Tyler Marinelli, 165 lbs.
- 2022 RJ Mosley, 165 lbs.
- 2023 RJ Mosley, 165 lbs.
- 2025 Takeo Davis, 133 lbs.
- 2025 Todd Carter, 141 lbs.

== NCAA Division I Wrestling Championship Qualifiers ==
- 2003 Eric Wince, 174 lbs.
- 2004 Joshua Pniewski, 133 lbs.
- 2005 Joshua Pniewski, 133 lbs.
- 2005 Daniel Elliott, 149 lbs.
- 2006 Joshua Pniewski, 133 lbs.
- 2006 Adam Glaser, 157 lbs.
- 2006 Daniel Elliott, 149 lbs.
- 2006 Brent Blackwell, 197 lbs.
- 2007 Rob Tate, 133 lbs.
- 2007 Dustin Porter, 197 lbs.
- 2008 Dustin Porter, 197 lbs.
- 2008 Eddie McCray, 149 lbs.
- 2009 Dustin Porter, 285 lbs.
- 2010 Dustin Porter, 285 lbs.
- 2012 Jonathan Velazquez, 184 lbs.
- 2012 Travis Porter, 197 lbs.
- 2012 Ryan Medved, 149 lbs.
- 2012 Alex Medved, 157 lbs.
- 2013 Hunter Gamble, 174 lbs.
- 2014 Austin Trott, 165 lbs.
- 2015 Ryan Mosley, 149 lbs.
- 2016 Chris Vassar, 149 lbs.
- 2016 Austin Trott, 165 lbs.
- 2016 Boyce Cornwell, 285 lbs.
- 2017 Ryan Mosley, 157 lbs.
- 2017 Austin Trott, 174 lbs.
- 2017 Hunter Gamble, 184 lbs.
- 2018 Tyler Marinelli, 157 lbs.
- 2019 Tyler Marinelli, 165 lbs.
- 2021 RJ Mosley, 165 lbs.
- 2021 Jha'Quan Anderson, 184 lbs.
- 2022 RJ Mosley, 165 lbs.
- 2023 RJ Mosley, 165 lbs.
- 2023 Jha'Quan Anderson, 184 lbs.
- 2024 Todd Carter, 141 lbs.
- 2024 Jha'Quan Anderson, 184 lbs.
- 2025 Takeo Davis, 134 lbs.
- 2025 Todd Carter, 141 lbs.
