= The Dancin' Bulldogs =

2020 American sports documentary

- Official Movie Poster
- Directed by: Christian Jessup; Thomas Manning; Eli Hardin
- Written by: Christian Jessup; Eli Hardin; Thomas Manning
- Produced by: Christian Jessup; Thomas Manning; Brendan Boylan
- Starring: Tim Craft; Jeremy Luther; Brendan Boylan; DJ Laster; David Efianayi; Chris Holtmann; Kyle Kallander; Jason Williford
- Music by: Christian Jessup
- Distributed by: YouTube
- Release date: October 16, 2020
- Running time: 81 minutes
- Country: United States
- Language: English
- Budget: $500

The Dancin' Bulldogs: A 16 Seed's Journey to the NCAA Tournament is a 2020 American feature-length sports documentary directed, written, and produced by Christian Jessup with co-writing by Thomas Manning and Eli Hardin as well as co-production by Manning and Brendan Boylan. The documentary depicts the 2018–19 Gardner–Webb Runnin' Bulldogs men's basketball team, which won the Big South Conference tournament and earned a bid to the NCAA tournament.

The film was created by a group of Gardner–Webb University alumni with various backgrounds including film production, music composition, and sports broadcasting. The Dancin' Bulldogs was released on YouTube on October 16, 2020.

== Subject matter ==
Despite moving from NCAA Division II to NCAA Division I in 2002 the Gardner-Webb Men's Basketball Team had never won their conference tournament or played in the NCAA tournament prior to the 2018–2019 season. During the 2018–2019 season, the team won the conference tournament and earned a spot in that year's NCAA Tournament as a 16 seed where they faced first seed Virginia. The documentary takes viewers through that season, starting with preseason activities and ending with the NCAA Tournament, where Gardner-Webb had a halftime lead over Virginia. The film not only highlights the ups and down of Gardner-Webb's season but also focuses on what it means for a school to earn a 16 seed in the NCAA Tournament. The film includes game and behind-the-scenes footage, as well as never-before-seen interviews with players, coaches, students, and the press. Some notable interviewees are: head coach Tim Craft; former Gardner-Webb head coach and current Ohio State head coach Chris Holtmann; Virginia assistant coach Jason Williford; and Big South Commissioner Kyle Kallander. Also featured in the film are Greg Gumbel, Marty Smith, Jim Nantz, Artis Gilmore, and Roy Cooper.

== Production ==
Production of the film began in May 2020 and was the idea of 2018 Gardner-Webb alum Christian Jessup. Jessup was a music composition and film studies major at Gardner-Webb, and works for a Raleigh, North Carolina marketing firm where he focuses on music composition. He originally planned to make a short 5-6 minute tribute to the team to also showcase his music composition skills but realized there was enough material to make a full-length feature film. Once the decision was made to make it a full-length film, Jessup recruited current Gardner-Webb student Thomas Manning (class of 2022), a communications and journalism major, to assist with writing and production. He also recruited fellow class of 2018 alum Eli Hardin, a student at Wake Forest University School of Law for writing and film research. Additionally, Brendan Boylan, a writer for Saints News Network on Si.com and a 2018 Gardner-Webb Graduate, was brought on board in July 2020, alongside his production company, Bottom of the Mug Productions.

The film was announced on July 9, 2020, and the first trailer debuted on July 10, 2020. Production of the film has progressed steadily through the summer of 2020 and a release date of October 16, 2020 was announced on July 31, 2020. Production of the film wrapped on October 6, 2020, a little over a week before the premier and the film was released on YouTube on October 16, 2020.

The production crew announced shortly after the release of the film, plans to release additional footage, particularly of interviews and games that did not make the final cut. Jessup, Manning, Hardin, and Boylan recorded a commentary track that was released on October 19, 2020 detailing behind-the-scenes details about the making of the film, and personal reflections from the crew about that season.

== Release ==
The film was released via the online streaming platform YouTube on October 16, 2020, at 7:00 p.m. EDT. Within 12 hours after the public release the film had amassed nearly 800 views, despite having no paid marketing. Within a week of release, The Dancin' Bulldogs had reached 2,500 views, eventually hitting 4,000 views seven weeks after its premiere. As of September 2024, the film had over 11,000 views.

== Reception ==
=== Public reaction ===
Initial reaction to the announcement of the film was positive with comments from players, coaches, fans, and journalists praising the idea of the film and expressing anticipation for its release. Views of the trailer were over 6,000 by July 11 and at 9,500 by the end of the month with the views of other clips also in the thousands. Additionally, social media accounts had amassed over 500 combined followers by the end of July. Brian Wilmer, a writer with Medium and NCAA Hoops Digest stated "I have covered hundreds and hundreds of basketball games. This documentary will tell the story of one of the greatest seasons I've ever witnessed. I can't wait to see it." Head coach Tim Craft tweeted "cant wait to relive these memories" and Gardner-Webb President William Downs also stated "can’t wait to see this come out!"

After its release, the Gardner–Webb community continued to be impressed with The Dancin' Bulldogs. President Dr. William Downs called the film a "wonderful tribute to a storybook season" and thanked the filmmakers for their "lasting contribution to Bulldog Nation". Alumnus Zane Gray praised the documentary as a "magnificent and touching tale about a basketball team making history," while alumnus Tanner Hoyle complemented the film's "storytelling style and progression" and was "enthralled with every step."

In September 2024, X (formerly known as Twitter) user @CurryHicksSage renewed interest in the film with a post commenting on the documentary, said post received over 3,000 impressions within a day including a repost by new Gardner-Webb head coach Jeremy Luther. @CurryHicksSage's post also generated additional conversation on the documentary with @sportsmatters calling the documentary "as must-see as it gets" and @CurryHicksSage comparing it to "some of the greatest films ever made."

=== Media coverage ===
On August 18, 2020 The Shelby Star, the local paper for Boiling Springs and Gardner–Webb University, ran a front-page article detailing the story behind the film with comments from Jessup. On October 8, 2020 an article ran on Sports Illustrated's website noting the upcoming release and Brendan Boylan's (a Sports Illustrated writer) involvement with the project.

=== Critical reaction ===
On online social networking service Letterboxd, The Dancin' Bulldogs holds an average rating of 4.64/5, with 64% of reviewers giving the film a perfect 5/5 stars.

Writing for Diary of a Spectator, Mallory Moore described the film as "a creative and memorable demonstration of faith, perseverance, and team-spirit". Her 4/5 star review emphasized the documentary's "precise editing" and "uplifting score". Likewise, Critics Choice Association member Noel Manning wrote that "the editing, writing, and original score are high spots for this film". Manning went on to praise the pacing of the film. "It is a difficult task (to say the least) to create a narrative flow that can maintain engagement for over 45 minutes … The Dancin' Bulldogs is one that doesn’t suffer from that issue … or very many for that matter."

== Soundtrack ==
In July 2020, it was announced that Christian Jessup would compose the film's score. He also wrote the music for the film's trailers, including an extended edition of the first trailer. Recording took place in Raleigh at Jessup's home, with Jessup performing all instruments himself via Virtual Studio Technology (VST). The film's score was completed in late September 2020, alongside the final editing. The soundtrack was released digitally on October 16, 2020, by Jessup Productions.

All music was composed and performed by Christian Jessup. In her review of the film, Mallory Moore states that "Jessup's uplifting score...highlights the emotional map of the season and brings the most intense moments to life."

=== Track listing ===
1. "Main Title" (2020) – 0:44
2. "A New Coach" (2020) – 2:01
3. "Preseason Hopes" (2020) – 5:04
4. "Embrace Your Role" (2020) – 3:16
5. "Who's Next?" (2020) – 5:18
6. "Conference Struggles" (2020) – 2:36
7. "A Team of Destiny" (2020) – 5:01
8. "Togetherness" (2020) – 4:09
9. "Showdown in the Semis" (2020) – 5:34
10. "Movie Script Stuff" (2020) – 4:06
11. "We're Going Dancing" (2020) – 3:44
12. "Congratulations" (2020) – 2:59
13. "The Red Carpet" (2020) – 1:51
14. "Leaving for the Tournament" (2020) – 1:51
15. "The Dancin' Bulldogs" (2020) – 6:13
16. "Only a Matter of Time" (2020) – 3:02
17. "Unforgettable" (2020) – 4:35
18. "End Credits" (2020) – 3:48

== Accolades ==
Award	Date of ceremony	Category	Recipient(s)	Result	Ref.
North Carolina Film Critics Association	January 4, 2021	Ken Hanke Memorial Tar Heel Award	The Dancin' Bulldogs	Nominated	
North Carolina Film Festival	June 5, 2021	Best Filmmakers	The Dancin' Bulldogs	Won	
Raleigh Film & Art Festival	October 3, 2021	Triumphant Film Series	The Dancin' Bulldogs	Won	
Indie Eye Film Awards	May 30, 2021	Best Documentary Feature	The Dancin' Bulldogs	Won	
Indie Eye Film Awards	May 30, 2021	Best Music	Christian Jessup	Won	
Indie Eye Film Awards	December 29, 2021	Documentary Feature of the Year	The Dancin' Bulldogs	Won	
