= Gardner–Webb University live mascots =

- University: Gardner-Webb
- Conference: Big South
- Description: English Bulldog
- Origin of name: 1922 (first use as bulldog as a mascot)

For over a century, the bulldog mascot has been associated with Gardner-Webb University. Athletic marks, live bulldogs, and costumed versions of the mascot have represented Gardner-Webb on the field of play and within the community. The first reported use of the mascot for Gardner-Webb was in 1922.

Throughout the decades, the live bulldog mascots have carried names like Butch, Chins, Victor, Barney, Roebuck and Bo. The costumed mascots have been known as Mack, Mac and Lulu, while the trademarked Runnin’ Bulldog logo has been referred to by Mack and Mac.

In 2021, the university introduced the newest official live mascot, Bo, an English Bulldog. Bo makes appearances at home athletic events and campus and community activities.

== Genealogy of live mascots at Gardner-Webb ==
=== Butch I (1944–1953) ===
The first live mascot was introduced during the transitional time of World War II (and the post-war years). The School was experiencing changes as well as it found a new name and focus; the name change from Boiling Springs College to Gardner-Webb was in honor of the former North Carolina Governor, O. Max Gardner and his wife Fay Webb Gardner.

Butch I was under the care of both football coach, Wayne Bradburn and College Dean, J.O. Terrell.

=== Butch II (1953–1955) ===
While a permanent replacement was being recruited to take over the collar from Butch I, Gerald Freeman, a football player at the school, offered his family bulldog to serve in the interim.

=== Chins (1955–1960) ===
Gardner-Webb is located in the small rural area of the southwestern Carolina town of Boiling Springs, N. C. Like many schools in communities of the like, local supporters engage in campus life; such was the case with Chins caretakers. Local dentist, H.S. Plaster and his wife, Ruth (a Gardner-Webb instructor) served as the mascot liaisons between the college and this live bulldog mascot.

=== Victor I (1960-1969) and Victor II (1969-1970) ===
Gardner-Webb alumnus, former clerk of court and postmaster for Boiling Springs, Horace C. “Bud” McSwain served as the caretaker for two bulldog mascots as Gardner-Webb prepared to transition to senior college status.

=== Barney (2010–2014) ===
The Gardner-Webb President, Dr. Frank Bonner and Student Development Vice President, Dr. Dee Hunt wanted to revive the live mascot program after 40 years without a four-legged runnin’ bulldog. Gardner-Webb registrar, Lou Ann Scates, offered family member, Barney, a young bulldog pup, to the university for the relaunch of the live mascot program.

=== Roebuck (2015–2021) ===
Mike Roebuck was a long-time university employee who worked in athletics and academic success; he died unexpectedly in 2015. The campus community choose to memorialize his name with the next live mascot. Brooke Greene and her family raised bulldogs, and they managed Roebuck’s appearances and engagements on behalf of Gardner-Webb.

=== Bo (since 2021) ===
Bo was inaugurated as the eighth official live mascot at Gardner-Webb as a puppy on August 26, 2021. Bo became Gardner-Webb's first full-time mascot and stays on campus most weekdays and during home athletic events. Bo is also the first Gardner-Webb mascot to have a dedicated and active web and social presence. Campus and community groups are also able to request official appearances of Bo.
