= Gardner–Webb Runnin' Bulldogs men's basketball =

2026–27 Gardner–Webb Runnin' Bulldogs men's basketball team
- University: Gardner–Webb University
- Head coach: Jeremy Luther (3rd season)
- Location: Boiling Springs, North Carolina
- Arena: Paul Porter Arena (capacity: 5,000)
- Conference: Big South
- Nickname: Runnin' Bulldogs
- Colors: Red and black

NCAA Division I tournament appearances
- 2000*, 2019

Conference tournament champions
- 2019

Conference regular-season champions
- 2005
- * at NCAA Division II level

The Gardner–Webb Runnin' Bulldogs men's basketball team is the men's college basketball team that represents Gardner–Webb University in Boiling Springs, North Carolina, United States. The school's team competes in the Big South Conference. They made their first NCAA tournament in 2019 by winning their first Big South tournament.

== Postseason ==
=== NCAA Division I Tournament results ===
The Runnin' Bulldogs have appeared in the NCAA Division I Tournament one time. They have a record of 0–1. Their 2018–2019 season is the subject of a documentary titled The Dancin’ Bulldogs which was released on October 16, 2020.

Year	Seed	Round	Opponent	Result
2019	#16	First Round	#1 Virginia	L 56–71

=== NCAA Division II Tournament results ===
The Runnin' Bulldogs have appeared in the NCAA Division II Tournament one time. Their record is 0–1.

Year	Round	Opponent	Result
2000	Regional Quarterfinals	Georgia College & State	L 81–92

=== CBI results ===
The Runnin' Bulldogs have appeared in the College Basketball Invitational (CBI) one time. Their record is 0–1.

Year	Round	Opponent	Result
2015	First Round	Colorado	L 78–87

=== CIT results ===
The Runnin' Bulldogs have appeared in one CollegeInsider.com Postseason Tournament (CIT). Their record is 0–1.

Year	Round	Opponent	Result
2013	First Round	Eastern Kentucky	L 62–69

== Notable former players ==
- David Efianayi (born 1995), basketball player for the Galatasaray Ekmas of the Basketbol Süper Ligi
- Artis Gilmore, played two years before transferring
- Eddie Lee Wilkins, played 6 seasons in the NBA
- John Drew, played in the NBA from 1974 to 1985
