= Amanda Cook =

Amanda Cook may refer to:

- Amanda Cook (politician), American politician appointed to the North Carolina House of Representatives in 2025
- Amanda Lindsey Cook, Canadian singer
- Amanda Cook, Canadian actress who appeared as Lorraine "L.D." Delacorte in Degrassi
