= North Carolina's 101st House district =

American legislative district

North Carolina's 101st State House of Representatives district
Representative
Carolyn Logan; D–Charlotte
- Demographics: 36% White; 41% Black; 14% Hispanic; 4% Asian; 1% Other; 4% Multiracial
- Population (2024): 87,474

North Carolina's 101st House district is one of 120 districts in the North Carolina House of Representatives. It has been represented by Democrat Carolyn Logan since 2019.

== Geography ==
Since 2003, the district has included part of Mecklenburg County. The district overlaps with the 38th and 41st Senate districts.

== District officeholders ==
Representative	Party	Dates	Notes	Counties
District established January 1, 2003
Beverly Earle (Charlotte)	Democratic	January 1, 2003 – January 1, 2019	Redistricted from the 60th district and re-elected in 2002. Re-elected in 2004. Re-elected in 2006. Re-elected in 2008. Re-elected in 2010. Re-elected in 2012. Re-elected in 2014. Re-elected in 2016. Retired.	2003–Present; Part of Mecklenburg County.
Carolyn Logan (Charlotte)	Democratic	January 1, 2019 – Present	Elected in 2018. Re-elected in 2020. Re-elected in 2022. Re-elected in 2024.	2003–Present; Part of Mecklenburg County.

== Election results ==
=== 2024 ===
North Carolina House of Representatives 101st district general election, 2024
Party	Candidate	Votes	%
Democratic	Carolyn Logan (incumbent)	34,424	100%
Total votes		34,424	100%
Democratic hold			

=== 2022 ===
North Carolina House of Representatives 101st district general election, 2022
Party	Candidate	Votes	%
Democratic	Carolyn Logan (incumbent)	16,035	74.89%
Republican	Steve Mauney	5,377	25.11%
Total votes		21,412	100%
Democratic hold			

=== 2020 ===
North Carolina House of Representatives 101st district general election, 2020
Party	Candidate	Votes	%
Democratic	Carolyn Logan (incumbent)	31,646	73.89%
Republican	Steve Mauney	11,183	26.11%
Total votes		42,829	100%
Democratic hold			

=== 2018 ===
North Carolina House of Representatives 101st district general election, 2018
Party	Candidate	Votes	%
Democratic	Carolyn Logan	2,575	49.98%
Democratic	Lucille Puckett	1,463	28.40%
Democratic	Chance Harris	742	14.40%
Democratic	Gregory J. Miller	372	7.22%
Total votes		5,152	100%

North Carolina House of Representatives 101st district general election, 2018
Party	Candidate	Votes	%
Democratic	Carolyn Logan	23,335	78.69%
Republican	Steve Mauney	6,319	21.31%
Total votes		29,654	100%
Democratic hold			

=== 2016 ===
North Carolina House of Representatives 101st district Democratic primary election, 2016
Party	Candidate	Votes	%
Democratic	Beverly Earle (incumbent)	7,212	78.59%
Democratic	Steven Jones	1,965	21.41%
Total votes		9,177	100%

North Carolina House of Representatives 101st district general election, 2016
Party	Candidate	Votes	%
Democratic	Beverly Earle (incumbent)	27,476	75.97%
Republican	Justin Dunn	8,691	24.03%
Total votes		36,167	100%
Democratic hold			

=== 2014 ===
North Carolina House of Representatives 101st district general election, 2014
Party	Candidate	Votes	%
Democratic	Beverly Earle (incumbent)	15,339	100%
Total votes		15,339	100%
Democratic hold			

=== 2012 ===
North Carolina House of Representatives 101st district Democratic primary election, 2012
Party	Candidate	Votes	%
Democratic	Beverly Earle (incumbent)	5,167	84.87%
Democratic	Lawrence Brinson	921	15.13%
Total votes		6,088	100%

North Carolina House of Representatives 101st district general election, 2012
Party	Candidate	Votes	%
Democratic	Beverly Earle (incumbent)	28,653	100%
Total votes		28,653	100%
Democratic hold			

=== 2010 ===
North Carolina House of Representatives 101st district Democratic primary election, 2010
Party	Candidate	Votes	%
Democratic	Beverly Earle (incumbent)	2,148	81.00%
Democratic	Rocky Bailey	504	19.00%
Total votes		2,652	100%

North Carolina House of Representatives 101st district general election, 2010
Party	Candidate	Votes	%
Democratic	Beverly Earle (incumbent)	15,184	74.30%
Republican	Rebecca H. Steen	5,253	25.70%
Total votes		20,437	100%
Democratic hold			

=== 2008 ===
North Carolina House of Representatives 101st district general election, 2008
Party	Candidate	Votes	%
Democratic	Beverly Earle (incumbent)	30,195	79.29%
Republican	Beth Marlin	7,886	20.71%
Total votes		38,081	100%
Democratic hold			

=== 2006 ===
North Carolina House of Representatives 101st district general election, 2006
Party	Candidate	Votes	%
Democratic	Beverly Earle (incumbent)	8,535	100%
Total votes		8,535	100%
Democratic hold			

=== 2004 ===
North Carolina House of Representatives 101st district general election, 2004
Party	Candidate	Votes	%
Democratic	Beverly Earle (incumbent)	20,474	100%
Total votes		20,474	100%
Democratic hold			

=== 2002 ===
North Carolina House of Representatives 101st district general election, 2002
Party	Candidate	Votes	%
Democratic	Beverly Earle (incumbent)	12,093	100%
Total votes		12,093	100%
Democratic hold			
