= Beverly Earle =

American politician (born 1943)

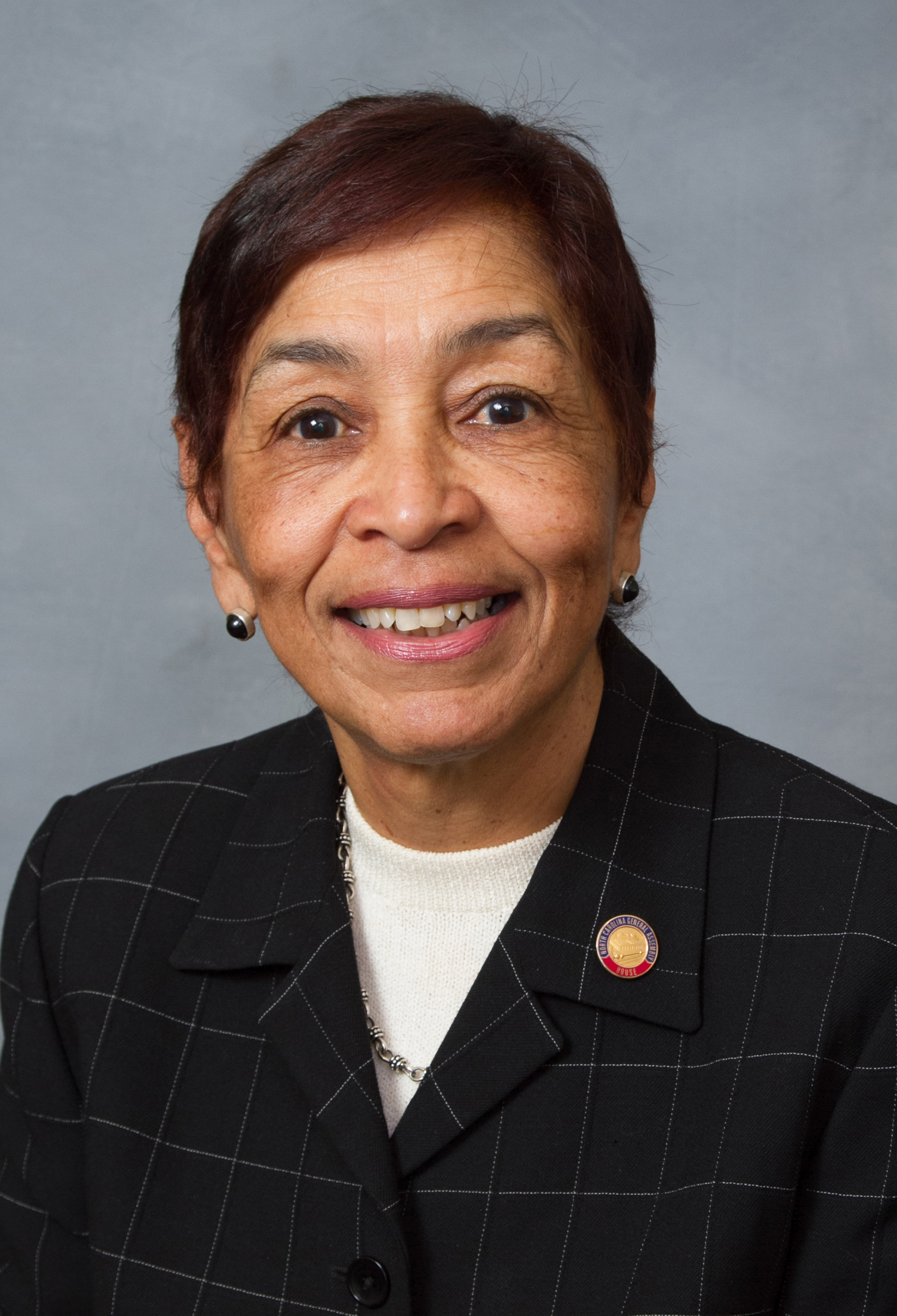
- Official portrait, 2013

Member of the North Carolina House of Representatives
- In office January 1, 1995 – January 1, 2019
- Preceded by: Howard Clinton Barnhill
- Succeeded by: Carolyn Logan
- Constituency: 60th district (1995–2003); 101st district (2003–2019)

Member of the Mecklenburg County Board of Elections
- Incumbent
- Assumed office May 1, 2019

Personal details
- Born: December 30, 1943 (age 82) Greensboro, North Carolina, U.S.
- Party: Democratic

Beverly Miller Earle (born December 30, 1943) is a former Democratic member of the North Carolina House of Representatives, having represented the 101st district, including constituents in Mecklenburg County from 1995 to 2019. A retiree from Charlotte, North Carolina, Earle served twelve terms in the state House.

== Political career ==
Earle is the current Chairwoman of the Mecklenburg County Board of Elections. She has previously served as the First Vice Chair for the North Carolina Democratic Party and was the Democratic Whip in the NC State House.

In 2007 she announced her candidacy for Mayor of Charlotte, North Carolina. but was defeated in the general election by Republican incumbent Pat McCrory.

In the NC House of Representatives, she previously served as Chair of the Appropriations Subcommittee on Health and Human Services, Chair of Mental Health Reform, Vice-chair of Health, and is a member of numerous committees, including Financial Institutions, Aging, Public Utilities, the House Select Committee on Comprehensive Rail Service Plan for NC, and the House Select Committee on Street Gang Prevention.

Earle is African-American.

== Electoral history ==
=== 2016 ===
North Carolina House of Representatives 101st district Democratic primary election, 2016
| Party | Candidate | Votes | % |
|---|---|---|---|
| Democratic | Beverly Earle (incumbent) | 7,212 | 78.59% |
| Democratic | Steven Jones | 1,965 | 21.41% |
| Total votes | | 9,177 | 100% |

North Carolina House of Representatives 101st district general election, 2016
| Party | Candidate | Votes | % |
|---|---|---|---|
| Democratic | Beverly Earle (incumbent) | 27,476 | 75.97% |
| Republican | Justin Dunn | 8,691 | 24.03% |
| Total votes | | 36,167 | 100% |
| Democratic hold | | | |

=== 2014 ===
North Carolina House of Representatives 101st district general election, 2014
| Party | Candidate | Votes | % |
|---|---|---|---|
| Democratic | Beverly Earle (incumbent) | 15,339 | 100% |
| Total votes | | 15,339 | 100% |
| Democratic hold | | | |

=== 2012 ===
North Carolina House of Representatives 101st district Democratic primary election, 2012
| Party | Candidate | Votes | % |
|---|---|---|---|
| Democratic | Beverly Earle (incumbent) | 5,167 | 84.87% |
| Democratic | Lawrence Brinson | 921 | 15.13% |
| Total votes | | 6,088 | 100% |

North Carolina House of Representatives 101st district general election, 2012
| Party | Candidate | Votes | % |
|---|---|---|---|
| Democratic | Beverly Earle (incumbent) | 28,653 | 100% |
| Total votes | | 28,653 | 100% |
| Democratic hold | | | |

=== 2010 ===
North Carolina House of Representatives 101st district Democratic primary election, 2010
| Party | Candidate | Votes | % |
|---|---|---|---|
| Democratic | Beverly Earle (incumbent) | 2,148 | 81.00% |
| Democratic | Rocky Bailey | 504 | 19.00% |
| Total votes | | 2,652 | 100% |

North Carolina House of Representatives 101st district general election, 2010
| Party | Candidate | Votes | % |
|---|---|---|---|
| Democratic | Beverly Earle (incumbent) | 15,184 | 74.30% |
| Republican | Rebecca H. Steen | 5,253 | 25.70% |
| Total votes | | 20,437 | 100% |
| Democratic hold | | | |

=== 2008 ===
North Carolina House of Representatives 101st district general election, 2008
| Party | Candidate | Votes | % |
|---|---|---|---|
| Democratic | Beverly Earle (incumbent) | 30,195 | 79.29% |
| Republican | Beth Marlin | 7,886 | 20.71% |
| Total votes | | 38,081 | 100% |
| Democratic hold | | | |

=== 2007 ===
Charlotte mayoral election, 2007
| Party | Candidate | Votes | % |
|---|---|---|---|
| Republican | Pat McCrory (incumbent) | 58,501 | 60.86% |
| Democratic | Beverly Earle | 37,624 | 39.14% |
| Total votes | | 96,125 | 100% |

=== 2006 ===
North Carolina House of Representatives 101st district general election, 2006
| Party | Candidate | Votes | % |
|---|---|---|---|
| Democratic | Beverly Earle (incumbent) | 8,535 | 100% |
| Total votes | | 8,535 | 100% |
| Democratic hold | | | |

=== 2004 ===
North Carolina House of Representatives 101st district general election, 2004
| Party | Candidate | Votes | % |
|---|---|---|---|
| Democratic | Beverly Earle (incumbent) | 20,474 | 100% |
| Total votes | | 20,474 | 100% |
| Democratic hold | | | |

=== 2002 ===
North Carolina House of Representatives 101st district general election, 2002
| Party | Candidate | Votes | % |
|---|---|---|---|
| Democratic | Beverly Earle (incumbent) | 12,093 | 100% |
| Total votes | | 12,093 | 100% |
| Democratic hold | | | |

=== 2000 ===
North Carolina House of Representatives 60th district general election, 2000
| Party | Candidate | Votes | % |
|---|---|---|---|
| Democratic | Beverly Earle (incumbent) | 16,332 | 56.93% |
| Republican | Barbara Underwood | 12,355 | 43.07% |
| Total votes | | 28,687 | 100% |
| Democratic hold | | | |

North Carolina House of Representatives
| Preceded by Howard Clinton Barnhill | Member of the North Carolina House of Representatives from the 60th district 1995–2003 | Succeeded by Earl Jones |
| Preceded by Constituency established | Member of the North Carolina House of Representatives from the 101st district 2003–2019 | Succeeded by Carolyn Logan |
