= Earl Jones (politician) =

American politician from North Carolina

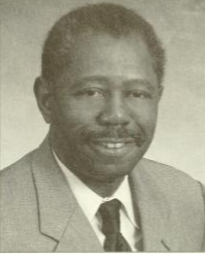
- Jones in the 2003 legislative manual

Member of the North Carolina House of Representatives from the 60th district
- In office January 1, 2003 – January 1, 2011
- Preceded by: Constituency established
- Succeeded by: Marcus Brandon

Personal details
- Born: July 20, 1949 (age 77)
- Party: Democratic
- Education: North Carolina Central University (BA); Southern University (JD)
- Profession: Publisher, newspaper owner

Earl Jones (born July 20, 1949) was a Democratic member of the North Carolina General Assembly representing the state's 60th House district. First elected in November 2002, he took office in January 2003. In 2010, he was defeated in the Democratic primary by Marcus Brandon. His term ended in January 2011.

He ran in the HD-60 Democratic primary in 2014, but was defeated by Cecil Brockman.

Jones is a lawyer, publisher & newspaper owner from Greensboro, North Carolina. He owns and publishes the Greensboro Times, which focuses on the African-American perspective, and cofounded Greensboro's International Civil Rights Center and Museum.

Jones previously served on Greensboro's City Council for eighteen years, and served as legal counsel to Greensboro's NAACP.

== Electoral history ==
=== 2014 ===
North Carolina House of Representatives 60th district Democratic primary election, 2014
Party	Candidate	Votes	%
Democratic	Cecil Brockman	2,262	54.23%
Democratic	Earl Jones	1,522	36.49%
Democratic	David Small	387	9.28%
Total votes		4,171	100%

=== 2012 ===
North Carolina House of Representatives 58th district Democratic primary election, 2012
Party	Candidate	Votes	%
Democratic	Marcus Brandon (incumbent)	4,928	66.17%
Democratic	Earl Jones	2,520	33.83%
Total votes		7,448	100%

=== 2010 ===
North Carolina House of Representatives 58th district Democratic primary election, 2010
Party	Candidate	Votes	%
Democratic	Marcus Brandon	1,625	59.81%
Democratic	Earl Jones (incumbent)	1,092	40.19%
Total votes		2,717	100%

=== 2008 ===
North Carolina House of Representatives 58th district general election, 2008
Party	Candidate	Votes	%
Democratic	Earl Jones (incumbent)	23,964	100%
Total votes		23,964	100%
Democratic hold			

=== 2006 ===
North Carolina House of Representatives 58th district general election, 2006
Party	Candidate	Votes	%
Democratic	Earl Jones (incumbent)	6,417	59.96%
Republican	Bill Wright	4,285	40.04%
Total votes		10,702	100%
Democratic hold			

=== 2004 ===
North Carolina House of Representatives 58th district general election, 2004
Party	Candidate	Votes	%
Democratic	Earl Jones (incumbent)	18,270	100%
Total votes		18,270	100%
Democratic hold			

=== 2002 ===
North Carolina House of Representatives 60th district Democratic primary election, 2002
Party	Candidate	Votes	%
Democratic	Earl Jones	2,257	49.88%
Democratic	Mazie Ferguson	1,234	27.27%
Democratic	Mary Lou Andrews Blakeney	1,034	22.85%
Total votes		4,525	100%

North Carolina House of Representatives 60th district general election, 2002
Party	Candidate	Votes	%
Democratic	Earl Jones	11,131	83.81%
Libertarian	Dan Groome	2,151	16.19%
Total votes		13,282	100%
Democratic win (new seat)			

North Carolina House of Representatives
Preceded by Beverly Earle	Member of the North Carolina House of Representatives from the 60th district 2003–2011	Succeeded by Marcus Brandon
