= Marcus Brandon =

American politician

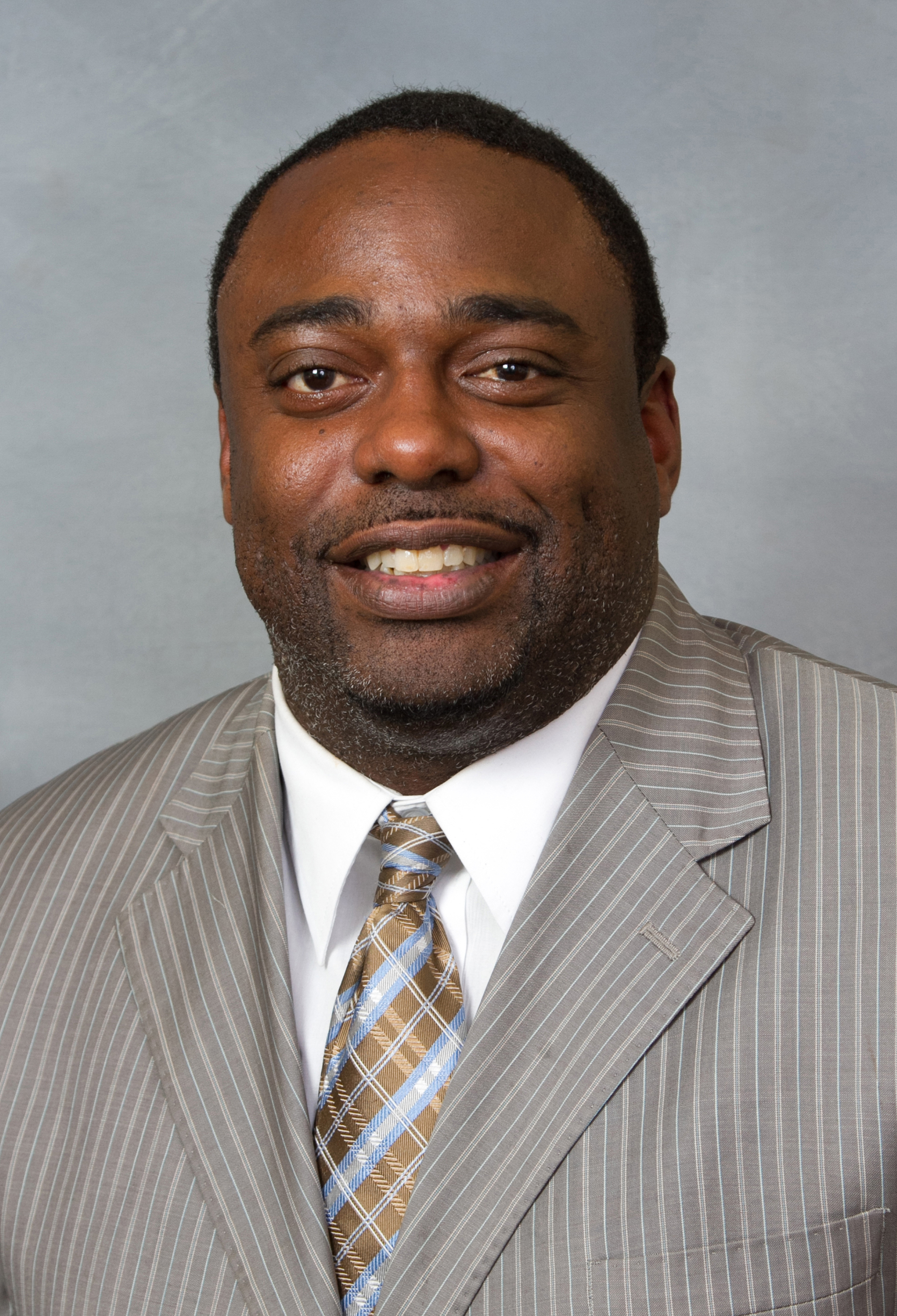

Member of the North Carolina House of Representatives from the 60th district
- In office January 1, 2011 – January 1, 2015
- Preceded by: Earl Jones
- Succeeded by: Cecil Brockman

Personal details
- Born: January 18, 1975 (age 51) Guilford County, North Carolina, U.S.
- Party: Democratic
- Website: marcusbrandon.com

Marcus Brandon is a politician from Greensboro, North Carolina who served in the North Carolina House of Representatives. A Democrat, he represented the 60th district from January 2011 through the end of 2014. In 2015, Brandon became the executive director of NorthCarolinaCan a nonprofit education policy and advocacy organization.

== Early life and career ==
A lifelong resident of Guilford County, North Carolina, Brandon graduated from Southern Guilford High School, class of 1993. He went on to attend North Carolina Agricultural and Technical State University (NC A&T) where he majored in political science.

Brandon is a political consultant by profession. He worked for NGP Software, a supplier of campaign software, and later served as national finance director for Dennis Kucinich's 2008 presidential campaign.

== Political career ==
North Carolina's 60th state house district includes parts of Greensboro, High Point and Pleasant Garden. Brandon challenged four-term incumbent Rep. Earl Jones in the Democratic primary held on May 4, 2010 and defeated him by 60% to 40%. The district is majority African American and heavily Democratic; in the 2010 general election Brandon, who is African-American, defeated his Republican opponent by a wide margin, taking 70% of the vote. He took office in January 2011.

In 2012, he again faced Earl Jones, who ran to reclaim his former seat. In the Democratic primary held on May 8, 2012, Brandon defeated Jones by 66% to 34%. He was unchallenged in the 2012 general election on November 6, 2012.

Brandon was named one of "12 State Legislators to Watch in 2014" by Governing.com.

Brandon ran for the House seat vacated by former Congressman Mel Watt but lost the Democratic primary to Alma Adams.

== Personal ==
Brandon is openly gay. He was the only openly LGBT member of the North Carolina General Assembly during his term.

== Electoral history ==
=== 2014 ===
North Carolina's 12th congressional district Democratic primary election, 2014
| Party | Candidate | Votes | % |
|---|---|---|---|
| Democratic | Alma Adams | 15,235 | 44.00% |
| Democratic | Malcolm Graham | 8,180 | 23.63% |
| Democratic | George Battle III | 4,342 | 12.54% |
| Democratic | Marcus Brandon | 2,856 | 8.25% |
| Democratic | James "Smuggie" Mitchell Jr. | 1,775 | 5.13% |
| Democratic | Curtis C. Osborne | 1,733 | 5.01% |
| Democratic | Rajive Patel | 502 | 1.45% |
| Total votes | | 34,623 | 100% |

North Carolina's 12th congressional district special Democratic primary election, 2014
| Party | Candidate | Votes | % |
|---|---|---|---|
| Democratic | Alma Adams | 14,967 | 44.22% |
| Democratic | Malcolm Graham | 7,495 | 22.14% |
| Democratic | George Battle III | 4,431 | 13.09% |
| Democratic | Marcus Brandon | 2,984 | 8.82% |
| Democratic | James "Smuggie" Mitchell Jr. | 2,034 | 6.01% |
| Democratic | Curtis C. Osborne | 1,939 | 5.73% |
| Total votes | | 33,850 | 100% |

=== 2012 ===
North Carolina House of Representatives 58th district Democratic primary election, 2012
| Party | Candidate | Votes | % |
|---|---|---|---|
| Democratic | Marcus Brandon (incumbent) | 4,928 | 66.17% |
| Democratic | Earl Jones | 2,520 | 33.83% |
| Total votes | | 7,448 | 100% |

North Carolina House of Representatives 58th district general election, 2012
| Party | Candidate | Votes | % |
|---|---|---|---|
| Democratic | Marcus Brandon (incumbent) | 27,755 | 100% |
| Total votes | | 27,755 | 100% |
| Democratic hold | | | |

=== 2010 ===
North Carolina House of Representatives 58th district Democratic primary election, 2010
| Party | Candidate | Votes | % |
|---|---|---|---|
| Democratic | Marcus Brandon | 1,625 | 59.81% |
| Democratic | Earl Jones (incumbent) | 1,092 | 40.19% |
| Total votes | | 2,717 | 100% |

North Carolina House of Representatives 58th district general election, 2010
| Party | Candidate | Votes | % |
|---|---|---|---|
| Democratic | Marcus Brandon | 10,664 | 69.65% |
| Republican | Lonnie R. Wilson | 4,646 | 30.35% |
| Total votes | | 15,310 | 100% |
| Democratic hold | | | |

North Carolina House of Representatives
| Preceded by Earl Jones | Member of the North Carolina House of Representatives from the 60th district 2011-2015 | Succeeded by Cecil Brockman |
