= Irvin-Hamrick Log House =

Historic house in North Carolina, United States

- U.S. National Register of Historic Places
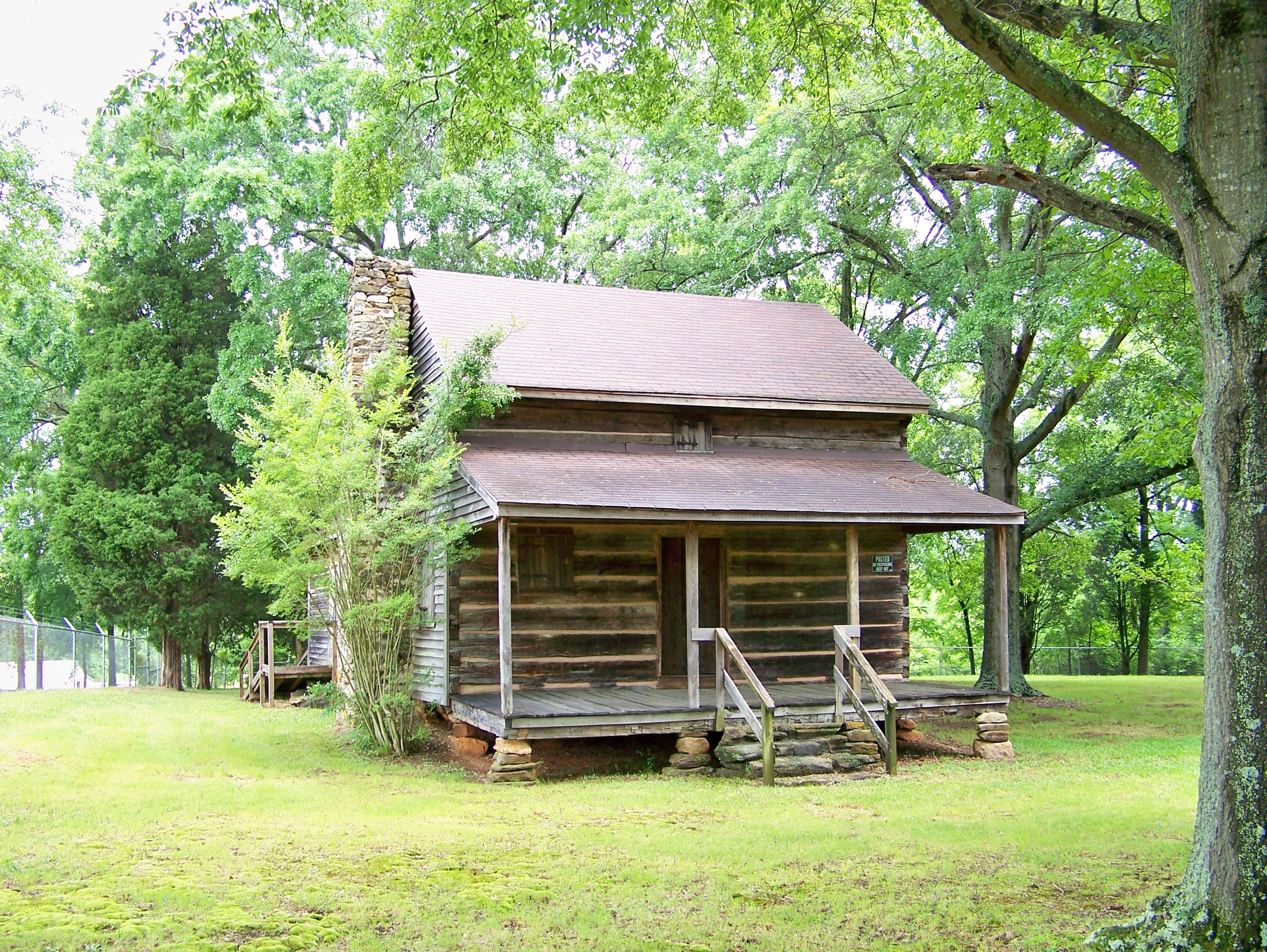

- Location within North Carolina Location within the United States
- Location: Northwest of Boiling Springs on SR 1153, near Boiling Springs, North Carolina
- Coordinates: 35°16′35″N 81°37′33″W
- Area: 1 acre (0.40 ha)
- Built: c. 1795, c. 1865
- Built by: Irvin, James; Hamrick, Sidney
- Architectural style: Log House
- NRHP reference No.: 80002811
- Added to NRHP: May 28, 1980

Irvin-Hamrick Log House is a historic home located near Boiling Springs, Cleveland County, North Carolina. It consists of log and frame sections. The front log section was built about 1795, and is a small, two room, rectangular, gable roof structure. It features a full-width shed porch. The frame rear addition was built after the American Civil War and is under a gable roof set perpendicular to the log house. Also on the property is a small cemetery enclosed by a wrought iron fence.

It was listed on the National Register of Historic Places in 1980.
