= E. B. Hamrick Hall =

Historic academic building in North Carolina

- U.S. National Register of Historic Places
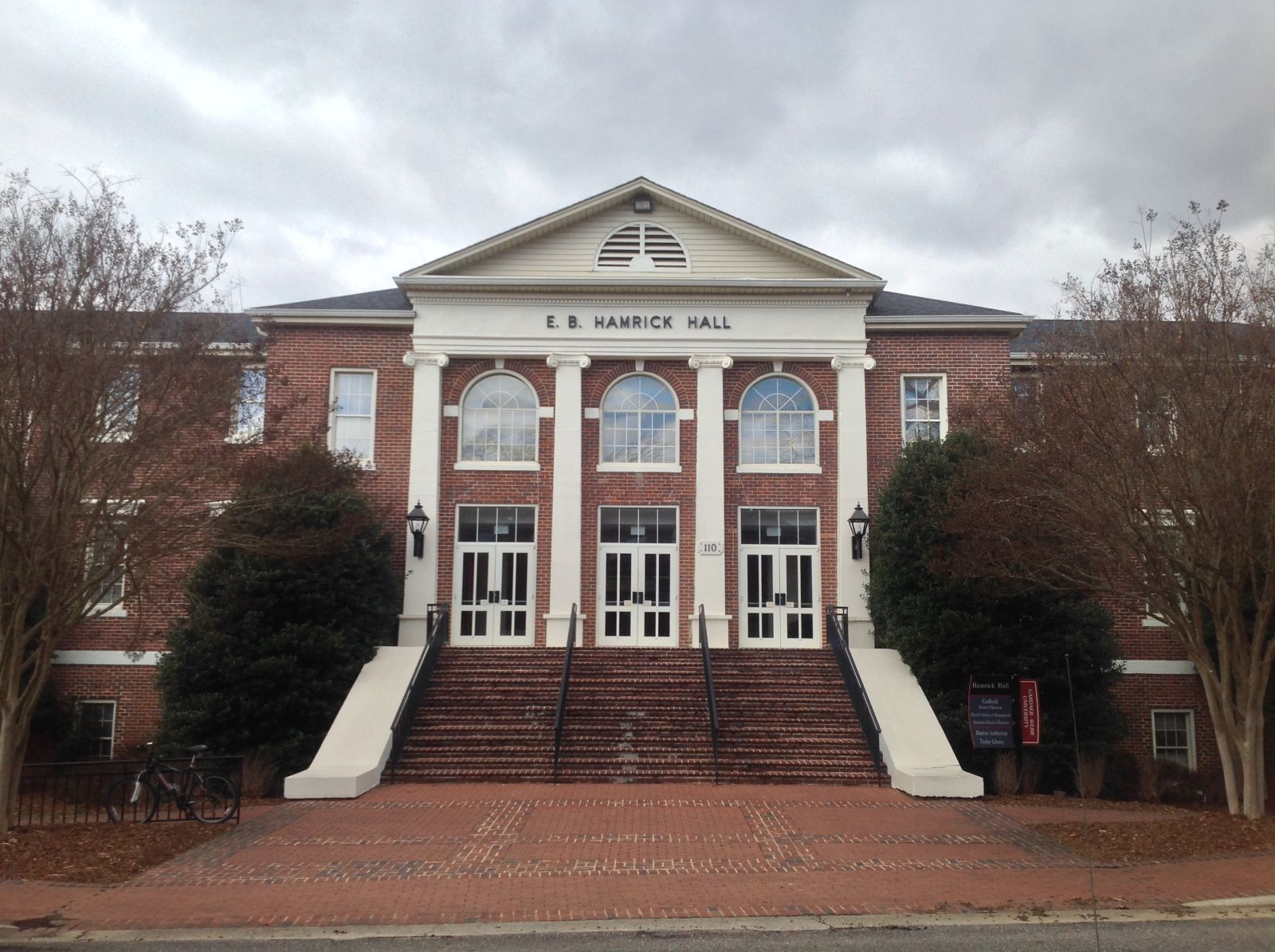

- Location within North Carolina Location within the United States
- Location: Gardner-Webb College campus, Boiling Springs, North Carolina
- Coordinates: 35°14′58″N 81°40′5″W
- Area: 0.7 acres (0.28 ha)
- Built: 1920-1925
- Architect: McAllister, Junius
- Architectural style: Colonial Revival
- NRHP reference No.: 82003444
- Added to NRHP: July 12, 1982

E. B. Hamrick Hall is a historic academic building located on the campus of Gardner-Webb University in Boiling Springs, Cleveland County, North Carolina. It currently houses the Godbold School of Business which encompasses both the undergraduate and graduate business programs of Gardner-Webb University. It was built between 1920 and 1925, and is a three-story, nine-bay, T-shaped, Colonial Revival-style brick building. It features a five-bay projecting entrance pavilion. It is the oldest building on the campus of Gardner-Webb University.

In 1925, the building was named Memorial Hall and dedicated to honor individuals from Cleveland and Rutherford Counties who died while serving in World War I, 1914–1918.

It was listed on the National Register of Historic Places in 1982.

On May 28, 2021, Hamrick Hall was rededicated in memory of students and alumni who had lost their lives during military service (dating back to World War I).
