= Cecil Brockman =

American politician from North Carolina

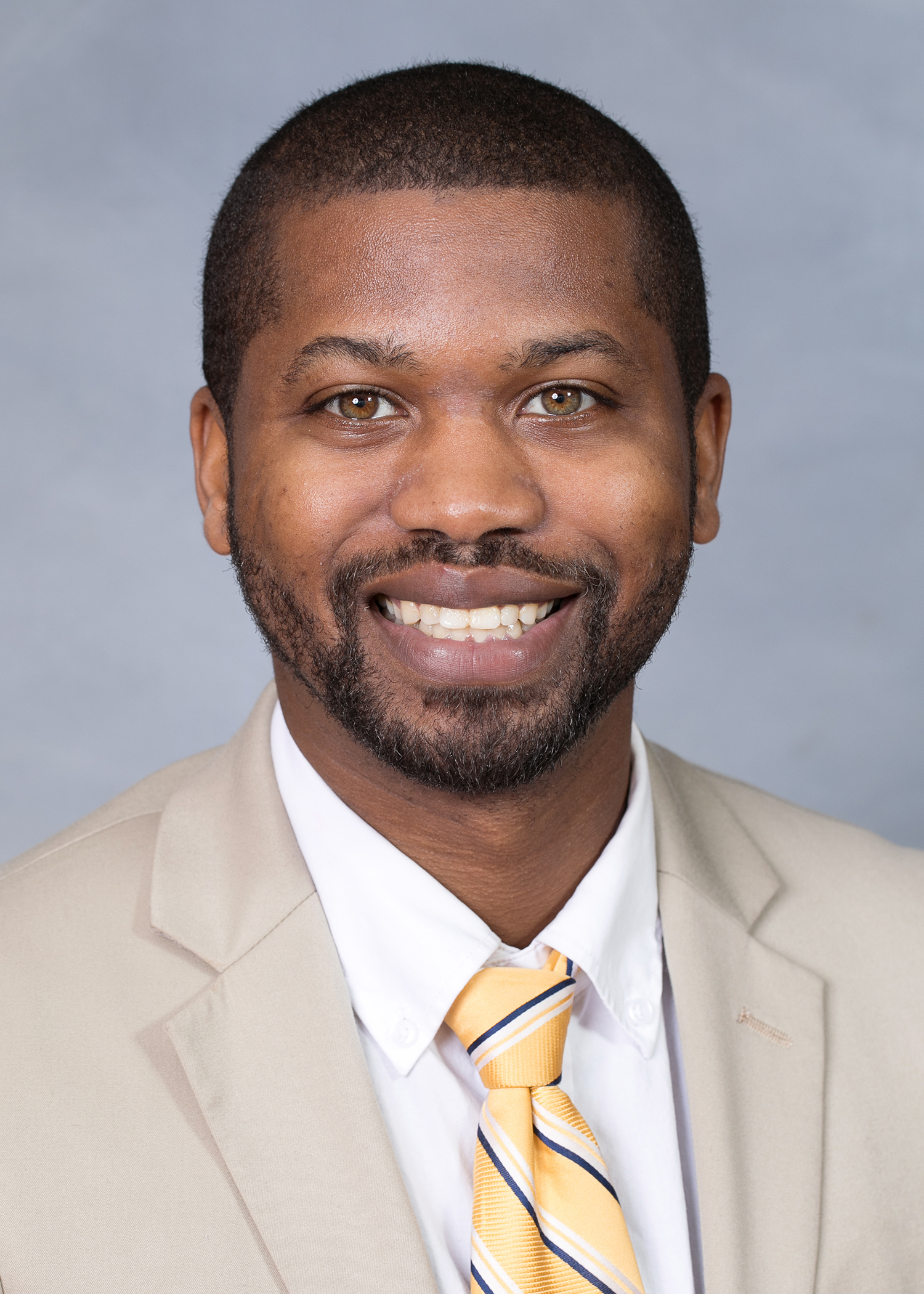

Member of the North Carolina House of Representatives from the 60th district
- In office January 1, 2015 – October 31, 2025
- Preceded by: Marcus Brandon
- Succeeded by: Amanda Cook

Personal details
- Born: Cecil Antonio Brockman; September 18, 1984 (age 41) High Point, North Carolina, U.S.
- Party: Democratic
- Education: University of North Carolina, Charlotte (BA)
- Website: Campaign page

Cecil Antonio Brockman (born September 18, 1984) is an American politician and accused child rapist from North Carolina. He was first elected to the North Carolina House of Representatives in 2014. A member of the Democratic party, he represented the 60th district (including constituents in southwestern Guilford County, including all of Jamestown and Pleasant Garden, as well as portions of Greensboro and High Point) from 2015 until his arrest and subsequent resignation on October 31, 2025.

== Personal life ==
Brockman is a native of High Point, North Carolina. He earned a degree in political science from UNC-Charlotte. Before running for office, he worked on several North Carolina political campaigns. He is openly bisexual. He was one of four openly LGBT members of the North Carolina General Assembly, alongside Reps. Deb Butler (D–Wilmington), Allison Dahle (D–Raleigh), and Marcia Morey (D–Durham).

On October 8, 2025, Brockman was arrested by the NCSBI (North Carolina State Bureau of Investigation) and charged with two counts of indecent liberties with a child and two counts of statutory rape of a child aged 13–15. He resigned from the North Carolina House on October 31, 2025.

== Committee assignments ==
=== 2023–2024 session ===
- Appropriations
- Appropriations - Education
- Education - K-12 (Vice Chair)
- Energy and Public Utilities
- Environment
- Health
- Redistricting

=== 2021–2022 session ===
- Appropriations
- Appropriations - Education
- Education - K–12 (Vice Chair)
- Election Law and Campaign Finance Reform
- Energy and Public Utilities
- Health
- Redistricting

=== 2019–2020 session ===
- Appropriations
- Appropriations - Education
- Education - K–12 (Vice Chair)
- Election Law and Campaign Finance Reform
- Energy and Public Utilities
- Health
- Redistricting

=== 2017–2018 session ===
- Appropriations
- Appropriations - Education
- Appropriations - Capital
- Education - K–12 (Vice Chair)
- Agriculture
- Environment
- Homeland Security, Military, and Veterans Affairs

=== 2015–2016 session ===
- Appropriations
- Appropriations - Education
- Appropriations - Capital
- Agriculture
- Environment
- Commerce and Job Development
- Transportation

== Electoral history ==
=== 2024 ===
North Carolina House of Representatives 60th district Democratic primary election, 2024
Party	Candidate	Votes	%
Democratic	Cecil Brockman (incumbent)	3,055	50.71%
Democratic	James Adams	2,970	49.29%
Total votes		6,025	100%

North Carolina House of Representatives 60th district general election, 2024
Party	Candidate	Votes	%
Democratic	Cecil Brockman (incumbent)	23,899	63.18%
Republican	Joseph Perrotta	13,928	36.82%
Total votes		37,827	100%
Democratic hold			

=== 2022 ===
North Carolina House of Representatives 60th district general election, 2022
Party	Candidate	Votes	%
Democratic	Cecil Brockman (incumbent)	14,686	58.94%
Republican	Bob Blasingame	10,232	41.06%
Total votes		24,918	100%
Democratic hold			

=== 2020 ===
Brockman was uncontested in the 2020 Democratic primary. He faced Frank Ragsdale in the general election and won with 64 percent of the vote.

North Carolina House of Representatives 60th district general election, 2020
Party	Candidate	Votes	%
Democratic	Cecil Brockman (incumbent)	25,120	64.06%
Republican	Frank Ragsdale	14,094	35.64%
Total votes		39,214	100%
Democratic hold			

=== 2018 ===
In 2018, Brockman defeated Kurt Collins with 69 percent of the vote.

North Carolina House of Representatives 60th district general election, 2018
Party	Candidate	Votes	%
Democratic	Cecil Brockman (incumbent)	17,718	69.04%
Republican	Kurt Collins	7,947	30.96%
Total votes		25,665	100%
Democratic hold			

=== 2016 ===
Brockman ran unopposed in the 2016 election for his district and was reelected.

North Carolina House of Representatives 60th district general election, 2016
Party	Candidate	Votes	%
Democratic	Cecil Brockman (incumbent)	27,035	100%
Total votes		27,035	100%
Democratic hold			

=== 2014 ===
Brockman was first elected to represent the 60th district in the North Carolina House in 2014.

North Carolina House of Representatives 60th district Democratic primary election, 2014
Party	Candidate	Votes	%
Democratic	Cecil Brockman	2,262	54.23%
Democratic	Earl Jones	1,522	36.49%
Democratic	David Small	387	9.28%
Total votes		4,171	100%

North Carolina House of Representatives 60th district general election, 2014
Party	Candidate	Votes	%
Democratic	Cecil Brockman	13,373	100%
Total votes		13,373	100%
Democratic hold			

North Carolina House of Representatives
Preceded by Marcus Brandon	Member of the North Carolina House of Representatives from the 60th district 2015–2025	Succeeded by Amanda Cook
