= North Carolina's 60th House district =

American legislative district

North Carolina's 60th State House of Representatives district
Representative
Amanda Cook; D–High Point
- Demographics: 39% White; 35% Black; 14% Hispanic; 8% Asian; 1% Other; 4% Multiracial
- Population (2024): 92,572

North Carolina's 60th House district is one of 120 districts in the North Carolina House of Representatives. It has been represented by Democrat Amanda Cook since her appointment to the seat on November 18th, 2025.

== Geography ==
Since 2003, the district has included part of Guilford County. The district overlaps with the 27th Senate district.

== District officeholders ==
Representative	Party	Dates	Notes	Counties
District created January 1, 1985.
Howard Clinton Barnhill (Charlotte)	Democratic	January 1, 1985 – January 1, 1995		1985–2003; Part of Mecklenburg County.
Beverly Earle (Charlotte)	Democratic	January 1, 1995 – January 1, 2003	Redistricted to the 101st district.	1985–2003; Part of Mecklenburg County.
Earl Jones (Greensboro)	Democratic	January 1, 2003 – January 1, 2011	Lost re-nomination.	2003–Present; Parts of Guilford County.
Marcus Brandon (High Point)	Democratic	January 1, 2011 – January 1, 2015	Retired to run for Congress.	2003–Present; Parts of Guilford County.
Cecil Brockman (High Point)	Democratic	January 1, 2015 – October 31, 2025	Resigned.	2003–Present; Parts of Guilford County.
Vacant		October 31, 2025 – November 18, 2025		2003–Present; Parts of Guilford County.
Amanda Cook (High Point)	Democratic	November 18, 2025 – Present	Appointed to finish Brockman's term.	2003–Present; Parts of Guilford County.

== Election results ==
=== 2026 ===
North Carolina House of Representatives 60th district Democratic primary election, 2026
Party	Candidate	Votes	%
Democratic	Amanda Cook (incumbent)	2,958	42.44%
Democratic	Angie Williams-McMichael	2,068	29.67%
Democratic	Joseph (Joe) Alston	1,136	16.30%
Democratic	Bruce Davis	808	11.59%
Total votes		6,970	100%

North Carolina House of Representatives 60th district general election, 2026
Party	Candidate	Votes	%
Democratic	Amanda Cook (incumbent)		
Republican	Joseph Perrotta		
Total votes			100%

=== 2024 ===
North Carolina House of Representatives 60th district Democratic primary election, 2024
Party	Candidate	Votes	%
Democratic	Cecil Brockman (incumbent)	3,055	50.71%
Democratic	James Adams	2,970	49.29%
Total votes		6,025	100%

North Carolina House of Representatives 60th district general election, 2024
Party	Candidate	Votes	%
Democratic	Cecil Brockman (incumbent)	23,899	63.18%
Republican	Joseph Perrotta	13,928	36.82%
Total votes		37,827	100%
Democratic hold			

=== 2022 ===
North Carolina House of Representatives 60th district general election, 2022
Party	Candidate	Votes	%
Democratic	Cecil Brockman (incumbent)	14,686	58.94%
Republican	Bob Blasingame	10,232	41.06%
Total votes		24,918	100%
Democratic hold			

=== 2020 ===
North Carolina House of Representatives 60th district Republican primary election, 2020
Party	Candidate	Votes	%
Republican	Frank Ragsdale	1,889	55.92%
Republican	Ryan A. Blankenship	1,489	44.08%
Total votes		3,378	100%

North Carolina House of Representatives 60th district general election, 2020
Party	Candidate	Votes	%
Democratic	Cecil Brockman (incumbent)	25,120	64.06%
Republican	Frank Ragsdale	14,094	35.64%
Total votes		39,214	100%
Democratic hold			

=== 2018 ===
North Carolina House of Representatives 60th district general election, 2018
Party	Candidate	Votes	%
Democratic	Cecil Brockman (incumbent)	17,718	69.04%
Republican	Kurt Collins	7,947	30.96%
Total votes		25,665	100%
Democratic hold			

=== 2016 ===
North Carolina House of Representatives 60th district general election, 2016
Party	Candidate	Votes	%
Democratic	Cecil Brockman (incumbent)	27,035	100%
Total votes		27,035	100%
Democratic hold			

=== 2014 ===
North Carolina House of Representatives 60th district Democratic primary election, 2014
Party	Candidate	Votes	%
Democratic	Cecil Brockman	2,262	54.23%
Democratic	Earl Jones	1,522	36.49%
Democratic	David Small	387	9.28%
Total votes		4,171	100%

North Carolina House of Representatives 60th district general election, 2014
Party	Candidate	Votes	%
Democratic	Cecil Brockman	13,373	100%
Total votes		13,373	100%
Democratic hold			

=== 2012 ===
North Carolina House of Representatives 58th district Democratic primary election, 2012
Party	Candidate	Votes	%
Democratic	Marcus Brandon (incumbent)	4,928	66.17%
Democratic	Earl Jones	2,520	33.83%
Total votes		7,448	100%

North Carolina House of Representatives 58th district general election, 2012
Party	Candidate	Votes	%
Democratic	Marcus Brandon (incumbent)	27,755	100%
Total votes		27,755	100%
Democratic hold			

=== 2010 ===
North Carolina House of Representatives 58th district Democratic primary election, 2010
Party	Candidate	Votes	%
Democratic	Marcus Brandon	1,625	59.81%
Democratic	Earl Jones (incumbent)	1,092	40.19%
Total votes		2,717	100%

North Carolina House of Representatives 58th district general election, 2010
Party	Candidate	Votes	%
Democratic	Marcus Brandon	10,664	69.65%
Republican	Lonnie R. Wilson	4,646	30.35%
Total votes		15,310	100%
Democratic hold			

=== 2008 ===
North Carolina House of Representatives 58th district general election, 2008
Party	Candidate	Votes	%
Democratic	Earl Jones (incumbent)	23,964	100%
Total votes		23,964	100%
Democratic hold			

=== 2006 ===
North Carolina House of Representatives 58th district general election, 2006
Party	Candidate	Votes	%
Democratic	Earl Jones (incumbent)	6,417	59.96%
Republican	Bill Wright	4,285	40.04%
Total votes		10,702	100%
Democratic hold			

=== 2004 ===
North Carolina House of Representatives 58th district general election, 2004
Party	Candidate	Votes	%
Democratic	Earl Jones (incumbent)	18,270	100%
Total votes		18,270	100%
Democratic hold			

=== 2002 ===
North Carolina House of Representatives 60th district Democratic primary election, 2002
Party	Candidate	Votes	%
Democratic	Earl Jones	2,257	49.88%
Democratic	Mazie Ferguson	1,234	27.27%
Democratic	Mary Lou Andrews Blakeney	1,034	22.85%
Total votes		4,525	100%

North Carolina House of Representatives 60th district general election, 2002
Party	Candidate	Votes	%
Democratic	Earl Jones	11,131	83.81%
Libertarian	Dan Groome	2,151	16.19%
Total votes		13,282	100%
Democratic win (new seat)			

=== 2000 ===
North Carolina House of Representatives 60th district general election, 2000
Party	Candidate	Votes	%
Democratic	Beverly Earle (incumbent)	16,332	56.93%
Republican	Barbara Underwood	12,355	43.07%
Total votes		28,687	100%
Democratic hold			
