= Carolyn Logan =

American politician

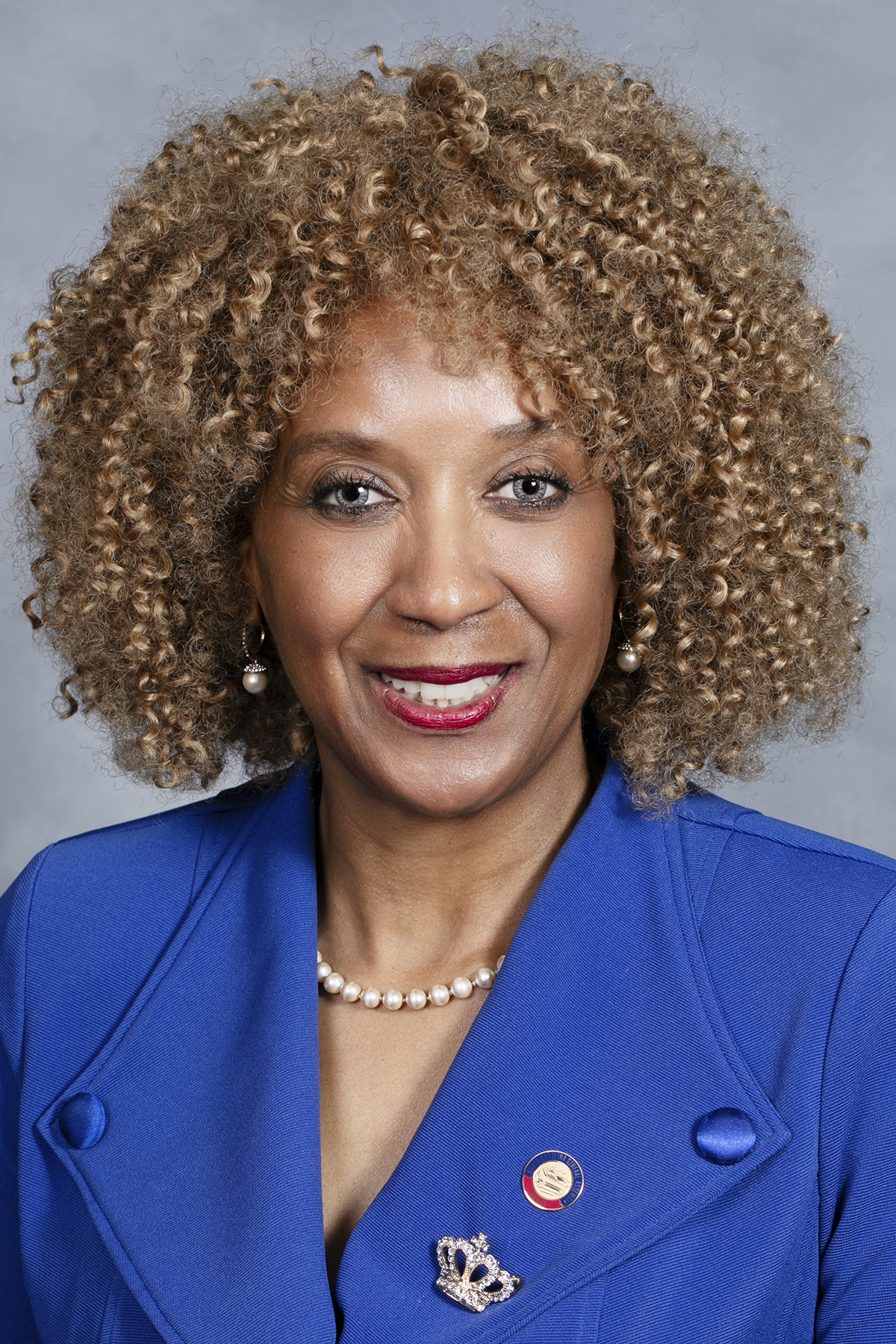
- Official portrait, 2019

Member of the North Carolina House of Representatives from the 101st district
- Incumbent
- Assumed office January 1, 2019
- Preceded by: Beverly Earle

Personal details
- Born: July 5, 1957 (age 69)
- Party: Democratic
- Children: 3

Carolyn Green Logan (born July 5, 1957) is a Democratic member of the North Carolina House of Representatives. She has represented the 101st district (including constituents Mecklenburg County) since 2019.

== Career ==
Logan began her public service in 1977 when she joined the Asheville Police Department, becoming the first African-American female police officer in Asheville, North Carolina.

Logan joined the North Carolina State Highway Patrol in 1984, where she became the first African-American female trooper in the state of North Carolina.

In 2007, Logan became the first female of any race to retire from the North Carolina Highway Patrol with the required 30-year minimum.

Logan won the November 2018 general election. She secured seventy-nine percent of the vote while her closest rival, Republican Paul Mauney, secured twenty-one percent. She was re-elected in 2020.

== Committee assignments ==
=== 2021-2022 session ===
- Appropriations
- Appropriations - General Government
- Federal Relations and American Indian Affairs
- Homeland Security, Military, and Veterans Affairs
- State Personnel

=== 2019-2020 session ===
- Appropriations
- Appropriations - General Government
- Homeland Security, Military, and Veterans Affairs
- State and Local Government

== Electoral history ==
=== 2020 ===
North Carolina House of Representatives 101st district general election, 2020
Party	Candidate	Votes	%
Democratic	Carolyn Logan (incumbent)	31,646	73.89%
Republican	Steve Mauney	11,183	26.11%
Total votes		42,829	100%
Democratic hold			

=== 2018 ===
North Carolina House of Representatives 101st district general election, 2018
Party	Candidate	Votes	%
Democratic	Carolyn Logan	2,575	49.98%
Democratic	Lucille Puckett	1,463	28.40%
Democratic	Chance Harris	742	14.40%
Democratic	Gregory J. Miller	372	7.22%
Total votes		5,152	100%

North Carolina House of Representatives 101st district general election, 2018
Party	Candidate	Votes	%
Democratic	Carolyn Logan	23,335	78.69%
Republican	Steve Mauney	6,319	21.31%
Total votes		29,654	100%
Democratic hold			

North Carolina House of Representatives
Preceded by Beverly Earle	Member of the North Carolina House of Representatives from the 101st district 2019–Present	Incumbent
