= Amanda Cook (politician) =

American politician

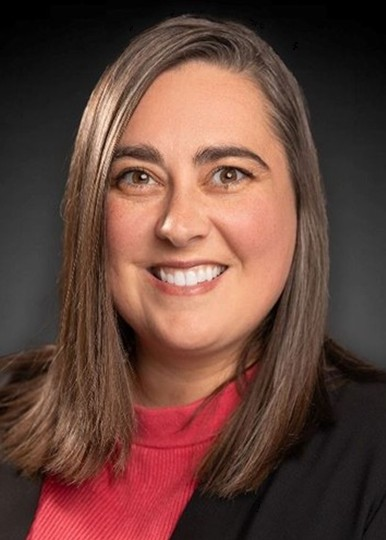
- Official portrait, 2025

Member of the North Carolina House of Representatives from the 60th district
- Incumbent
- Assumed office November 18, 2025
- Preceded by: Cecil Brockman

Personal details
- Born: November 2, 1982 (age 43)
- Party: Democratic
- Education: University of North Carolina at Greensboro (BA); Gardner–Webb University (MA)
- Website: Campaign website Legislature website

Amanda Parsons Cook (born November 2, 1982) is an American politician and former educator serving as a Democratic member of the North Carolina House of Representatives from the 60th district. A Democrat, she was appointed to the seat following Cecil Brockman's resignation after being charged with child sexual assault and previously served on the High Point City Council.

== Early life and career ==
Cook earned a Bachelor of Arts in dance education with a minor in communication studies from the University of North Carolina at Greensboro in 2008 and a Masters of Arts in Curriculum and Instruction and Teacher Leadership from Gardner-Webb University in July 2021. She worked as a dance teacher at Winston-Salem/Forsyth County Schools from 2008 to 2017 and at Southwest Guilford High School from 2017 to 2021, then founded the nonprofit Teachers' Edge.

In 2022, Cook ran for a seat on the Guilford County Schools board and was defeated by Republican nominee Chrissy Pratt in the general election.

In November 2023, Cook was elected to the High Point City Council from one of two at-large seats, placing second with 26.3% of the vote.

== North Carolina House of Representatives ==
Following Cecil Brockman's resignation after being charged with child sexual assault, the Guilford County Democratic Party voted to nominate Cook for governor Josh Stein's appointment to the seat. She defeated three other candidates with 108.5 weighted votes: educator Angie Williams McMichael with 52.5, former Guilford County Democratic Party chair Joseph Alston with 26, and former Guilford County commissioner Bruce Davis with 10 votes. Her nomination was celebrated by the local and state party, but chair of the Guilford County Commission Melvin “Skip” Alston (Joseph Alston's brother) criticized the nomination as Cook would be the first White American to represent the majority-minority seat.

North Carolina House of Representatives
Preceded by Cecil Brockman	Member of the North Carolina House of Representatives from the 60th district 2025–Present	Incumbent
