= Blake Lalli =

American baseball player & coach (born 1983)

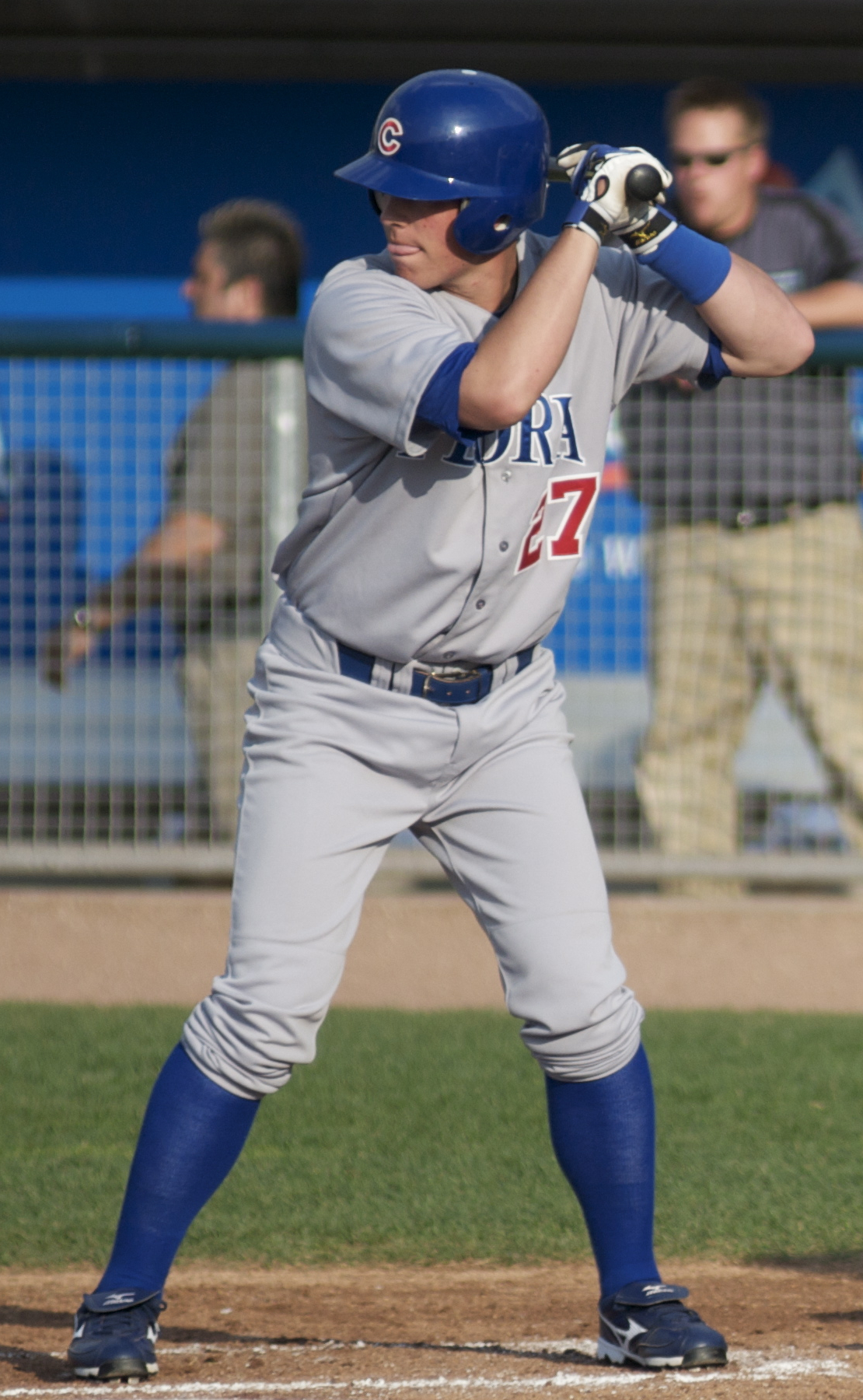
- Lalli with the Peoria Chiefs in 2008

Miami Marlins – No. 45
- First baseman / Catcher
- Born: May 12, 1983 (age 43); Gibsonia, Pennsylvania, U.S.
- Batted: Left Threw: Right

MLB debut
- May 18, 2012, for the Chicago Cubs

Last MLB appearance
- September 29, 2016, for the Atlanta Braves

MLB statistics
- Batting average: .135
- Home runs: 0
- Runs batted in: 5
- Stats at Baseball Reference

Teams
- As player: Chicago Cubs (2012); Milwaukee Brewers (2013); Atlanta Braves (2016); As coach: Miami Marlins (2025–present)

Blake Thomas Lalli (born May 12, 1983) is an American former professional baseball first baseman and catcher and current third base coach for the Miami Marlins of Major League Baseball (MLB). He played in MLB for the Chicago Cubs, Milwaukee Brewers, and Atlanta Braves.

== Playing career ==
=== Amateur ===
Lalli graduated from Pine-Richland High School in Gibsonia, Pennsylvania, in 2001. He attended Gardner–Webb University from 2002 through 2006, where he played for the school's baseball team. Lalli was named to the All-Atlantic Sun Conference's first team as a third baseman in 2005 and as a catcher in 2006. In 2005, he played collegiate summer baseball with the Harwich Mariners of the Cape Cod Baseball League.

=== Chicago Cubs ===
Undrafted out of college, Lalli signed with the Chicago Cubs as a free agent in 2006. He was named a Southern League All-Star in 2009, 2010, and 2011. The Cubs promoted Lalli to MLB on May 18, 2012, and he made his MLB debut that day. He became the first GWU alumnus to appear in MLB.

=== Oakland Athletics ===
On August 27, 2012, the Athletics acquired Lalli from the Chicago Cubs in exchange for catcher Anthony Recker.

=== Milwaukee Brewers ===
On November 14, 2012, the Milwaukee Brewers signed Lalli to a minor league contract and invited him to spring training. On April 9, 2013, Lalli's contract was purchased and he was added to the Major League roster by the Brewers. He was designated for assignment on September 19, 2013, and became a free agent on October 1.

=== Arizona Diamondbacks ===
On October 28, 2013, Lalli signed a minor league contract with the Arizona Diamondbacks. He became a minor league free agent after the 2014 season.

On November 26, 2014, Lalli re–signed with the Diamondbacks organization on a minor league contract.

=== Atlanta Braves ===
On February 3, 2016, Lalli signed a minor league contract with the Atlanta Braves. On September 11, Lalli was called up from the Triple–A Gwinnett Braves. He was released by Atlanta on May 13, 2017.

=== Arizona Diamondbacks (second stint) ===
On June 7, 2017, Lalli signed a minor league contract with the Arizona Diamondbacks.

== Coaching career ==
=== Kane County Cougars ===
For the 2018 season, Lalli was named the manager for the Kane County Cougars, the Single–A affiliate of the Diamondbacks.

=== Jackson Generals ===
After one year in the Chicago suburbs, he left to become manager of the Jackson Generals for the 2019 season. In one season with the Generals, Lalli led the team to their third championship in the last four seasons in the Southern League.

=== Reno Aces ===
On February 1, 2021, Lalli was announced as the new manager for the Reno Aces. He became the youngest manager in Aces history and first to be a former Aces player.

=== Miami Marlins ===
On January 17, 2025, the Miami Marlins hired Lalli to serve as their third base coach.

== Personal ==
Lalli resides in Boiling Springs, North Carolina during the baseball offseason.
