= Gardner–Webb University =

Christian university in Boiling Springs, North Carolina, US

Coordinates: 35.2474562°N 81.6706223°W

- Former names: Boiling Springs High School (1905–1928); Boiling Springs Junior College (1928–1942); Gardner–Webb Junior College (1942–1971); Gardner–Webb College (1971–1993)
- Motto: Pro Deo et Humanitate
- Motto in English: For God and Humanity
- Type: Private university
- Established: 1905
- Religious affiliation: Baptist
- Endowment: $79.7 million
- President: Nate Evans
- Provost: Nicole Waters
- Students: 3,124 (fall 2023)
- Location: Boiling Springs, North Carolina, United States
- Colors: Scarlet and black
- Nickname: Runnin' Bulldogs
- Sporting affiliations: NCAA Division I – Big South Conference
- Mascots: Mac and Lulu (costumed bulldogs) and Bo is the Live mascot
- Website: www.gardner-webb.edu

Gardner–Webb University (GWU) is a private Baptist university in Boiling Springs, North Carolina, United States. It was founded as Boiling Springs High School in 1905. Gardner–Webb is classified as a Doctoral/Professional university.

Over 3,000 students attend Gardner–Webb, including undergraduate, graduate, and online students. Nine colleges and schools offer more than 80 undergraduate and graduate major fields of study. GWU's Runnin' Bulldogs compete in NCAA Division I as a member of the Big South Conference in most sports, although the men's and women's swim teams compete in the Coastal Collegiate Sports Association and the wrestling team competes in the Southern Conference.

== History ==
=== Beginnings ===
On December 2, 1905, the Boiling Springs High School was chartered as a result of an initiative sponsored by the Kings Mountain Baptist Association (Cleveland County) and the Sandy Run Baptist Association (Rutherford County). The institution served as a place "where the young...could have the best possible educational advantages under distinctive Christian influence." In May 1905, Boiling Springs Baptist Church voted to offer its old church house, five acres of land, and $2,700 to the institution, and on July 10, 1905, Boiling Springs was officially chosen for the site of the school. The location of the high school was essential, as it was located near the border of the school's sponsors, Kings Mountain and Sandy Run, and had easy access to brick building materials. The institution's name, Boiling Springs High School, was decided on October 27, 1905, and its charter was accepted less than two months later by the school's trustees. Willard Winslow Washburn, the man who first set forth the idea of a Christian school at Boiling Springs, and the first man to sign the certificate of incorporation would go on to serve on the board of trustees for the first 30 years of its existence. The town of Boiling Springs is named after the natural springs that can be found on campus. They provided clean water for the school when it began operation in 1907.

J.D. Huggins was made the high school's first principal on July 25, 1907. The complete faculty, which consisted of five teachers, including Huggins, was hired by the fall of 1907. Classes started in October of the same year, although the main building, the Huggins-Curtis Building, was not complete. Students lived in various homes in the community and used classrooms from the nearby elementary school until the building's completion in 1908. The building included classrooms, auditoriums, a chapel, library, principal's office, cafeteria, living quarters, literary societies, a music room, and parlors. It burned down in 1957.

Boiling Springs High School focused on Christian education, as evident in the school's motto, Pro Deo et Humanitate (for God and Humanity). These words were inscribed upon "the ageless granite arch" on campus, which still exists today. Original tuition was $76.05 for a term of nine months. Its focus centered around ministerial education.

=== Expansion and growth ===
The high school became Boiling Springs Junior College on September 3, 1928 due to the changing educational needs of the area. The Great Depression created many obstacles for the college, but its survival was secured by the sacrifices of loyal supporters. The college began with seven departments: English, mathematics, natural science, foreign language, social science, Bible, and education. The first graduating class consisted of roughly 200 students, with one of the earliest graduates being W. J. Cash, author of The Mind of the South.

In 1942, Governor O. Max Gardner began devoting his energy, time, and wealth to strengthening the college. On June 15, the trustees voted to change the name to Gardner–Webb Junior College in honor of Gardner and his wife, Fay Webb-Gardner. That officially took effect on August 27, 1942. During the following year, the institution embarked on a $300,000 financial campaign. At the conclusion of this initiative the trustees announced the school to be debt-free.

The decades following World War II were years of physical growth and academic development. New buildings went up as enrollments increased. On October 23, 1969, Gardner–Webb filed with the register of deeds for an official name change from Gardner–Webb Junior College to Gardner–Webb College in preparation for the first four-year class (for students earning bachelor's degrees) in 1971. A major step in the institutions' development was its full accreditation as a senior college in December 1971, gaining the name Gardner–Webb College. In 1980, the college began a graduate program, which became the Graduate School in the 1990s. The School of Divinity was also founded during this time. On November 12, 1991, Gardner–Webb was approved to seek university status by the board of trustees. The institution officially became known as Gardner–Webb University in January 1993.

E. B. Hamrick Hall was listed on the National Register of Historic Places in 1982.

=== Recent history ===
In 2007, Gardner–Webb University, along with four other private North Carolina Christian colleges, began a process to change their relationships with the Baptist State Convention of North Carolina, in order to obtain more academic freedom and select their own trustees. The state convention also agreed to start transferring funds traditionally given directly to the universities into a new scholarship fund for Baptist students.

In 2009, the schools gained autonomy from the Baptist State Convention of North Carolina and established a "good faith and cooperative" relationship with it. The four other schools were, Mars Hill University, Campbell University, Wingate University, and Chowan University. A year later in 2010 the Tucker Student Center, was named after Robert B. Tucker following his $5.5 million donation.

In February 2014, openly gay minister and Gardner–Webb alumnus Cody Sanders was invited to speak about his recent book Queer Lessons for Churches on the Straight and Narrow: What All Christians can Learn from LGBTQ Lives as a part of the Life of the Scholar speaker series. Sanders's invitation to Gardner–Webb received greater attention after a letter to the editor titled "Where are the wise at Gardner–Webb?" was published in The Biblical Recorder, the bi-weekly newspaper of the Baptist State Convention of North Carolina (BSCNC). This prompted Gardner–Webb University's president at the time, Frank Bonner, to publish a response in the same paper affirming the university's stance that marriage is to be between one man and one woman.

== Campus ==
The main campus in Boiling Springs is situated on 225 acres in the foothills of the Blue Ridge Mountains between Charlotte and Asheville. There is an additional satellite campus in Charlotte.

The E.B. Hamrick Hall is the oldest existing building on the Gardner–Webb campus. It was built during the 1920s and dedicated to students who died during World War I. It was listed on the National Register of Historic Places in 1982, and was rededicated to all students and alumni who died during military service (in all wars since World War I) in 2021. Today, Hamrick Hall is the home for the Godbold College of Business.

In 2021, Gardner–Webb University purchased nearly two acres of land in Boiling Springs for the construction of an amphitheater complex. The State of North Carolina allocated $500,000 towards the outdoor amphitheater project in July 2022.

== Academics ==
There are over 3,000 students enrolled at Gardner–Webb, including the day program, graduate studies, Gardner–Webb Online, and the Degree Completion Program (designed for adult learners seeking to finish their degree). There are nine colleges and schools that offer nearly 80 undergraduate and graduate major fields of study.

As of spring 2025, there were 132 full-time faculty members, 71% of full-time faculty had a Ph.D. or an equivalent degree, and the average class size was 13 students.

=== Rankings ===
Academic rankings

National
- U.S. News & World Report: 356 (tie) of 394
- Washington Monthly: 294 of 442

In the 2024 college rankings of U.S. News & World Report, Gardner–Webb was ranked tied for 356 of 394 in a list of national universities.

=== Admissions ===
The acceptance rate at Gardner–Webb is 60%; admissions are conducted on a rolling basis. The average admissions statistics for the class of 2025 are: SAT: 1015; ACT: 22; GPA: 3.72.

=== Accreditations and affiliations ===
Gardner–Webb is accredited by the Commission on Colleges of the Southern Association of Colleges and Schools to award associate, bachelor's, master's, and doctoral degrees.

It is affiliated with the Baptist State Convention of North Carolina (Southern Baptist Convention) the Cooperative Baptist Fellowship of North Carolina, the Cooperative Baptist Fellowship, and the Baptist General Association of Virginia.

== Student life ==
=== Demographics ===
Gardner–Webb hosts students from 44 different states, 36 foreign countries, and 92 North Carolina counties. The student body is approximately 66% female and 34% male and the racial makeup of the student body is 52% White, 25% Black, 15% Unclassified, 3% Hispanic, 2% Asian, 2% Multiracial, 1% American Indian.

== Athletics ==
Gardner–Webb's teams are known as the Runnin' Bulldogs, and participate in 21 varsity sports at the NCAA Division I level. Ten of these are men's sports and eleven are women's. The school colors are scarlet, black and white. The Bulldogs are part of the Big South Conference, although the men's and women's swim teams compete in the Coastal Collegiate Sports Association, and the wrestling team competes in the Southern Conference.

The University has won conferences in men's basketball, women's basketball, football, men's golf, women's swimming, men's soccer, and men's tennis.

=== Bulldog mascot ===
Athletic marks, living animals, and costumed versions of the bulldog mascot have represented Gardner–Webb on the field of play and within the community. The first reported use of the mascot for Gardner–Webb was in 1922.

Throughout the decades, the Gardner–Webb live bulldog mascots have carried names like Butch, Chins, Victor, Barney, Roebuck and Bo. The costumed mascots have been known as Mack, Mac, and Lulu, while the trademarked Runnin' Bulldog logo has been referred to by Mack and Mac.

In 2021, the university introduced the newest official live mascot, "Bo", an English Bulldog.

== Notable alumni ==
- George Adams, professional basketball player
- Linda Combs, Controller of the Office of Management and Budget for three White House administrations
- Jeffrey David Cox, former National President of the American Federation of Government Employees
- John Drew, small forward for the Atlanta Hawks
- Artis Gilmore, professional basketball player
- Johnny Hunt, senior pastor of First Baptist Church Woodstock
- Beth Kennett, politician, first woman mayor of Burlington, North Carolina
- Blake Lalli, third base coach for the Miami Marlins of Major League Baseball
- Sara McMann, 2004 Olympic silver medalist in women's freestyle wrestling; professional mixed martial arts fighter
- Mason Miller, pitcher for the San Diego Padres
- Ron Rash, poet, writer and professor at Western Carolina University
- Takayo Siddle, head coach of the UNC Wilmington Seahawks men's basketball team
- Mallory Weggemann, gold-medalist Paralympic swimmer for the United States Swim Team
- Gabe Wilkins, American football defensive end who played for the Green Bay Packers and San Francisco 49ers
