= Boiling Springs, North Carolina =

- Town
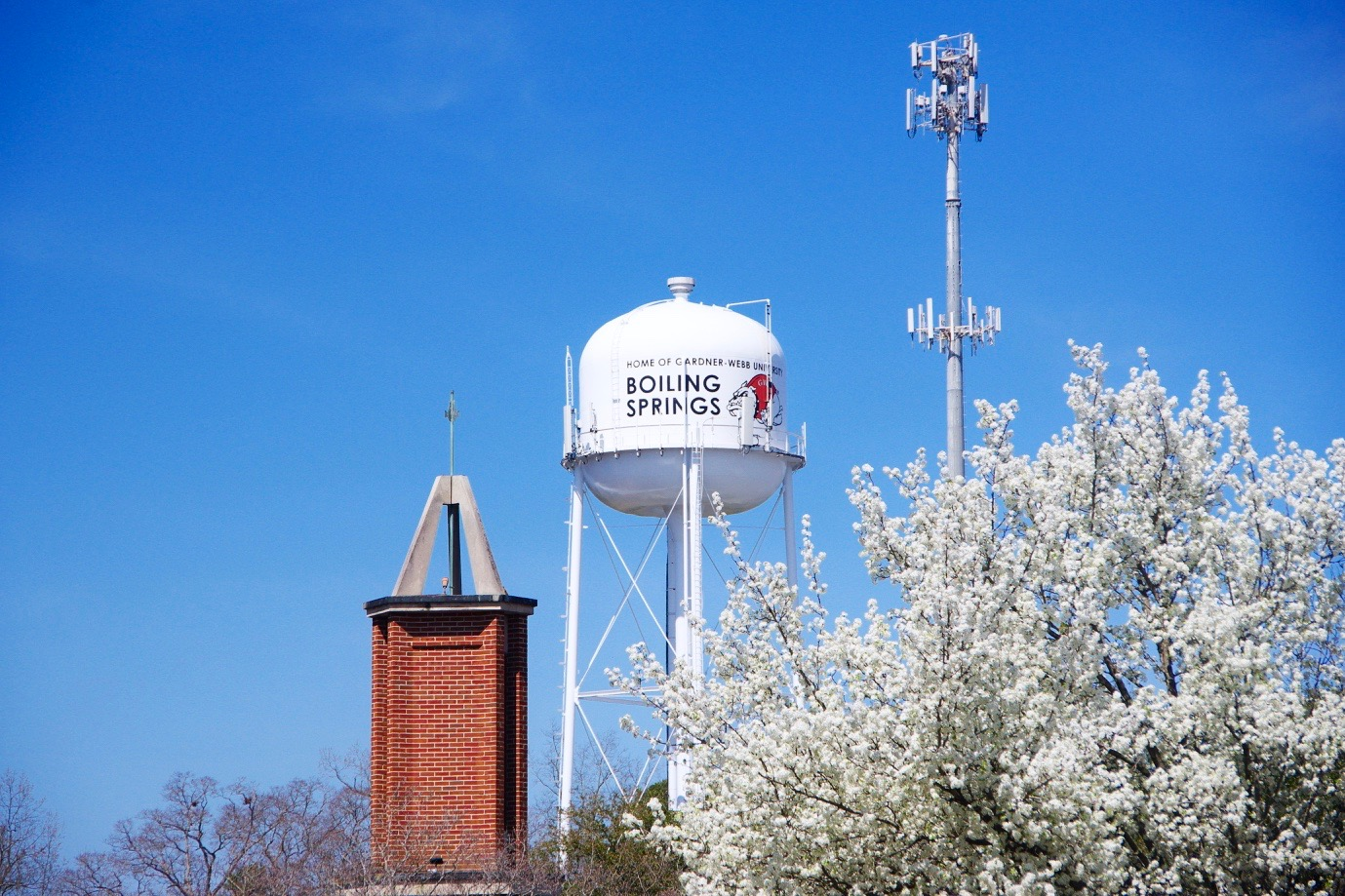
- Water tower in Boiling Springs

- Logo
- Motto: "Crossroads of Opportunity"
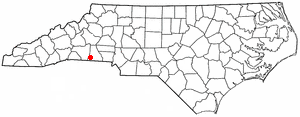
- Location of Boiling Springs, North Carolina
- Coordinates: 35°15′07″N 81°39′49″W
- Country: United States
- State: North Carolina
- County: Cleveland

Area
  - Total: 4.48 sq mi (11.60 km^{2})
  - Land: 4.48 sq mi (11.60 km^{2})
  - Water: 0 sq mi (0.00 km^{2})
- Elevation: 856 ft (261 m)

Population (2020)
  - Total: 4,615
  - Density: 1,030.0/sq mi (397.69/km^{2})
- Time zone: UTC-5 (Eastern (EST))
  - Summer (DST): UTC-4 (EDT)
- ZIP code: 28017
- Area code: 704
- FIPS code: 37-06800
- GNIS feature ID: 2405296
- Website: www.boilingspringsnc.gov

Boiling Springs is a town in Cleveland County, North Carolina, United States, in the westernmost part of the Charlotte metropolitan area, approximately 50 miles away from the city. As of the 2020 census, Boiling Springs had a population of 4,615. It is home to Gardner–Webb University. The town is named after the natural spring found on the university's property, which feeds a small lake.

== History ==
People began settling the area around the namesake boiling springs in 1843. The first families to settle were the Hamricks, the Greenes and the McSwains. It was only appropriate that the settlement be named Boiling Springs. One of the first buildings was Boiling Springs Baptist Church, built in 1847 about 100 yards from the springs. Boiling Springs was known as a sleepy community, with no railroads, no industries, few stores and no paved streets. At the turn of the 20th century, Kings Mountain Baptist and Sandy Run Associations began looking for a place to build their denominational high school and chose Boiling Springs because it was geographically situated between the two associations and because the Boiling Springs community made concerted efforts to attract the school. The Boiling Springs High School boarding institution opened for business in 1905. School authorities felt that neither intoxicating drinks nor cigarettes should be sold near the school, so in 1911 the town was incorporated in order to ban the sale of such items. Town limits were decided by drawing a mile and a half radius from the school's original bell tower.

Incorporation of the town proved to be a major step forward because it provided a government that could function and enable the town not only to grow but to furnish water, police and fire protection, paved streets and garbage collection for the town and the school. As time progressed the growth of the town was largely tied to the growth of the Boiling Springs High School which became the Boiling Springs Junior College in 1928, Gardner Webb Junior College in 1942, and finally after achieving status as a senior college and developing several graduate programs, Gardner–Webb University in 1993.

Voters approved ordinances to allow for the sale of beer, unfortified wine, and malt beverages within town limits in 2018.

E. B. Hamrick Hall and the Irvin-Hamrick Log House are listed on the National Register of Historic Places.

== Geography ==
Boiling Springs is located in southwestern Cleveland County. North Carolina Highway 150 passes through the town, leading east 9 miles (14 km) to Shelby, the county seat, and south 13 miles (21 km) to Gaffney, South Carolina. The South Carolina border is less than 6 miles (10 km) south of the town. Mooresboro is 4 miles (6 km) north. Charlotte, approximately 50 miles (80 km) east, is the closest major city.

According to the United States Census Bureau, the town has a total area of 4.4 square miles (11.5 km^{2}), all land. The Broad River runs 3 miles (5 km) south of the town, and is the location of the Broad River Greenway, providing recreational facilities, activities and trails.

== Government ==
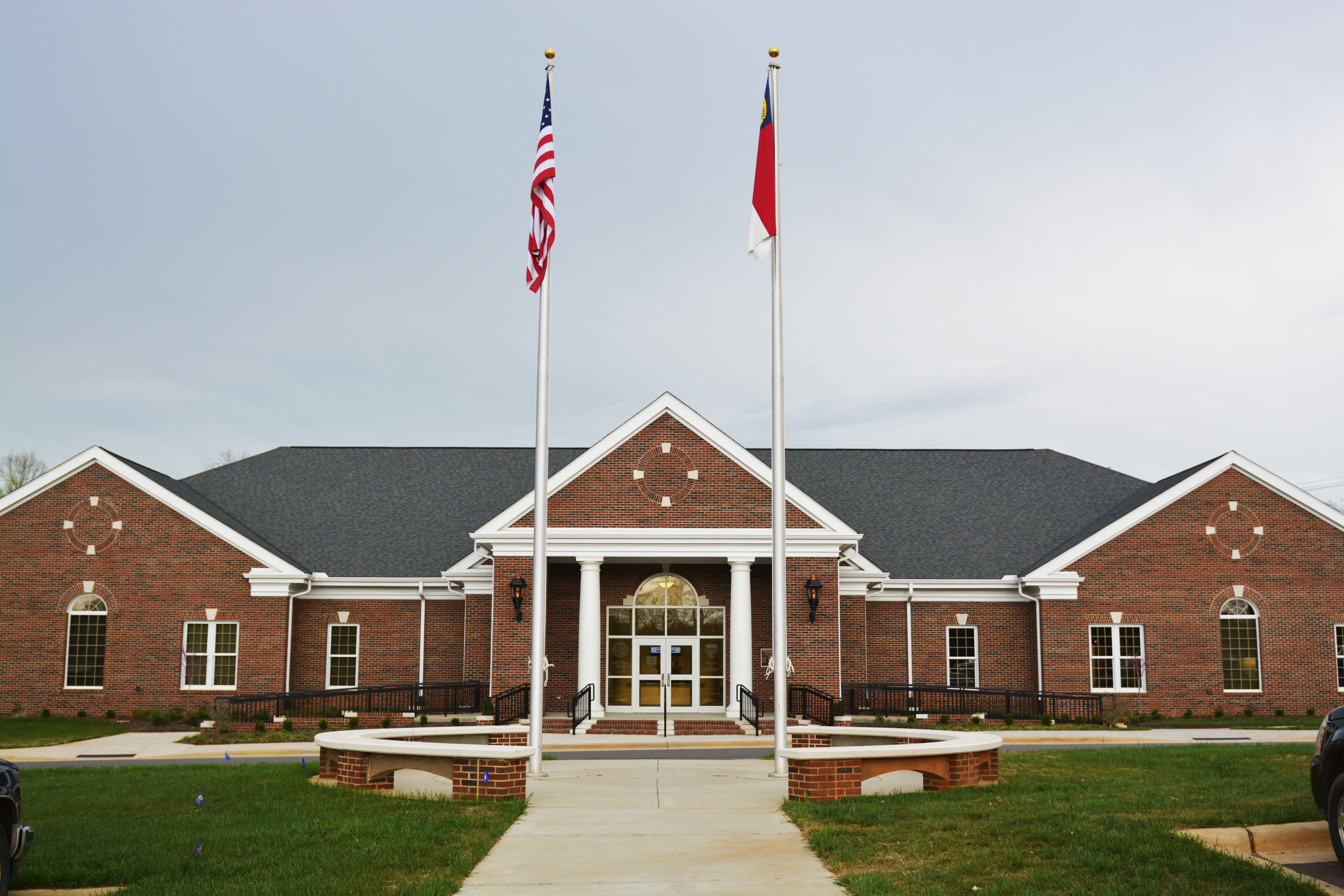
Town hall

The Town of Boiling Springs' Council-Manager form of government with a Mayor and five Councilmen (one of whom serves as Mayor Pro-Tem) who are each elected at-large in staggered four year terms. The Town Council appoints a town attorney and town manager to advise the council and oversee the town's operations. All other staff report to the town manager, who manages the day-to-day operations.

== Demographics ==
Historical population
Census	Pop.	Note	%±
1930	672		—
1940	613		−8.8%
1950	1,145		86.8%
1960	1,311		14.5%
1970	2,284		74.2%
1980	2,381		4.2%
1990	2,445		2.7%
2000	3,866		58.1%
2010	4,647		20.2%
2020	4,615		−0.7%
2023 (est.)	4,637	▲	0.5%
U.S. Decennial Census

=== 2020 census ===
Boiling Springs racial composition
Race	Number	Percentage
White (non-Hispanic)	3,625	78.55%
Black or African American (non-Hispanic)	594	12.87%
Native American	6	0.13%
Asian	41	0.89%
Other/Mixed	176	3.81%
Hispanic or Latino	173	3.75%

As of the 2020 census, Boiling Springs had a population of 4,615. The median age was 27.3 years. 17.3% of residents were under the age of 18 and 11.8% of residents were 65 years of age or older. For every 100 females there were 90.2 males, and for every 100 females age 18 and over there were 86.7 males age 18 and over.

0.0% of residents lived in urban areas, while 100.0% lived in rural areas.

There were 1,401 households in Boiling Springs, including 877 families, of which 34.1% had children under the age of 18 living in them. Of all households, 54.3% were married-couple households, 14.6% were households with a male householder and no spouse or partner present, and 27.8% were households with a female householder and no spouse or partner present. About 25.0% of all households were made up of individuals and 10.2% had someone living alone who was 65 years of age or older.

There were 1,465 housing units, of which 4.4% were vacant. The homeowner vacancy rate was 0.5% and the rental vacancy rate was 5.8%.

=== 2000 census ===
As of the census of 2000, there were 3,866 people, 1,117 households, and 832 families residing in the town. The population density was 891.7 inhabitants per square mile (344.3/km^{2}). There were 1,184 housing units at an average density of 273.1 per square mile (105.4/km^{2}). The racial makeup of the town was 89.29% White, 8.67% African American, 0.13% Native American, 0.78% Asian, 0.41% from other races, and 0.72% from two or more races. Hispanic or Latino of any race were 1.40% of the population.

There were 1,117 households, out of which 38.7% had children under the age of 18 living with them, 62.9% were married couples living together, 9.7% had a female householder with no husband present, and 25.5% were non-families. 21.6% of all households were made up of individuals, and 7.0% had someone living alone who was 65 years of age or older. The average household size was 2.57 and the average family size was 3.02.

In the town the population was spread out, with 20.9% under the age of 18, 30.2% from 18 to 24, 24.5% from 25 to 44, 15.5% from 45 to 64, and 8.8% who were 65 years of age or older. The median age was 24 years. For every 100 females, there were 89.8 males. For every 100 females age 18 and over, there were 82.8 males.

The median income for a household in the town was $48,861, and the median income for a family was $54,837. Males had a median income of $38,098 versus $24,559 for females. The per capita income for the town was $14,984. About 3.6% of families and 5.6% of the population were below the poverty line, including 2.4% of those under age 18 and 7.7% of those age 65 or over.

== Schools ==
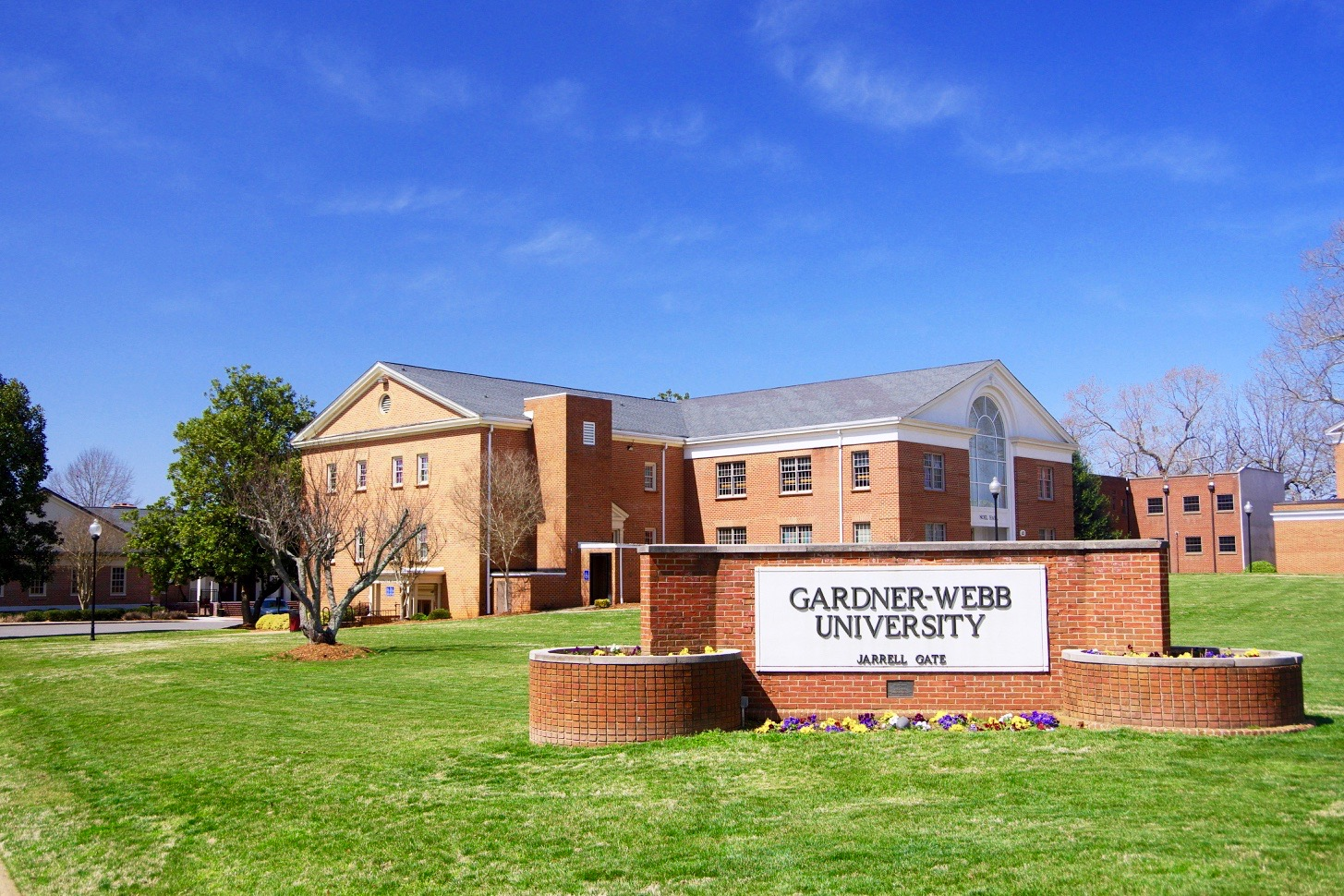
Gardner-Webb University

- Gardner-Webb University (private accredited university)
- Willow Tree Community School (private school)
- Crest Middle School (Cleveland County Public Schools)
- Crest High School (Cleveland County Public Schools)
- Boiling Springs Elementary (Cleveland County Public Schools)
- Springmore Elementary (Cleveland County Public Schools)

== Transportation ==
Air travel

- Charlotte Douglas International Airport is located 46 miles (74 km) east of Boiling Springs.
- Greenville-Spartanburg International Airport is located 47 miles (76 km) south of Boiling Springs.
- Shelby Cleveland County Regional Airport is 4 miles (6 km) east of Boiling Springs.

Roads

- NC Route 150 runs directly through town.
- US Route 74 passes 3 miles (5 km) north of the town.
- Interstate 85 is 13 miles (21 km) south and 25 miles (40 km) east of the town.

Pedestrian and bicycle

- A bike lane along NC 150 (South Main) connects to the Broad River Greenway.
- Pedestrian facilities are limited.

== Notable people ==
- W. J. Cash, author
- Blake Lalli, former MLB player
- Lorcan Morris, Professional Golf Caddie
- Gerald R. Murray, 14th Chief Master Sergeant of the Air Force
- Ron Rash, poet, short story writer, and novelist
- David Thompson, former NBA player
