= Florence Nature Preserve =

Nature preserve in North Carolina, US

- IUCN category V (protected landscape/seascape)
- Location within North Carolina Location within the United States
- Location: Henderson County, North Carolina, United States
- Nearest city: Gerton
- Coordinates: 35°28′26″N 82°19′57″W
- Area: 600 acres (240 ha)
- Elevation: 2,280 ft (690 m)
- Established: May 4, 2005
- Named for: Tom and Glenna Florence
- Governing body: Conserving Carolina

Florence Nature Preserve is a publicly-accessible privately owned nature preserve in Gerton, Henderson County, North Carolina in the United States. The 600-acre (2.4 km^{2}) nature preserve is located 18 miles (29 km) southeast of Asheville, North Carolina, and is owned and managed by Conserving Carolina, a local nonprofit, member-supported land trust.

== Early park development ==
The preserve was named after Dr. Tom and Glenna Florence, who donated the land that makes up the preserve. A 50% interest in the 600 acres was donated to Conserving Carolina, then known as the Carolina Mountain Land Conservancy, in 1996, which was the first property that the land trust owned. The Florence couple went on to donate the remaining 50% interest in the property in 2001. Conserving Carolina adopted and improved nearly five miles of existing trails and has opened the land to the public as the Florence Nature Preserve. Additionally, a small portion of the land is owned by Henderson County Parks.

== Recreation ==
The preserve contains five hiking trails. Notable sights on the trails include vistas of the summit of Burnshirt Mountain from Rattlesnake Rock, a scenic view of Chimney Rock State Park's Hickory Nut Gorge from Little Pisgah Point, waterfalls, creeks, and various wildlife.

Additionally, an access hiking trail links the park to nearby Little Bearwallow Falls, as well as the interconnected Bearwallow Mountain, Trombatore, and Strawberry Gap trails, all of which are managed by Conserving Carolina. Trails on the preserve are part of the Hickory Nut Gorge State Trail, which may someday connect the preserve to Chimney Rock State Park.

== See also ==
- Hickory Nut Gorge State Trail
- Chimney Rock State Park
- DuPont State Forest
