= 2014 Nordic Folkboat Gold Cup =

Event title
- Edition: 52nd
- Host: Kerteminde Sejlklub

Event details
- Venue: Kerteminde, Denmark
- Dates: 29 July – 2 August
- Yachts: Nordic Folkboat
- Titles: 1

Competitors
- Competitors: 155
- Competing nations: 5

Results
- Winner: Tibbe Tit – Frisendahl, Empacher & Nygaard

The 2014 Nordic Folkboat Gold Cup was held in Kerteminde, Denmark between July 29 and August 2, 2014. The hosting yacht club was Kerteminde Sejlklub.

== Results ==
Results of individual races
Pos	Boat name	Crew	Club	I	II	III	IV	V	VI	Tot	Pts
Gold medal	Tibbe Tit	Brian Frisendahl; Michael Empacher; Claus Nygaard	Sundby Sejlforening	3	2	1	8	BFD 53	3	70	17
Silver medal	ALPI	Flemming Palm; Thomas Bastrup; Søren Nissen	Kerteminde Sejlklub	18	1	5	1	3	12	40	22
Bronze medal	hasta la vista	Sönke Durst; Karsten Butze Bredt; Marc Rokicki	Laboer Regattaverein	11	4	31	12	8	1	67	36
4	Cirkeline	Søren Kæstel; Erik Andersen; Johs Egede Olsen	Hellerup Sejlklub	17	15	12	3	1	16	64	47
5	Tuffe	Michael Bergholdt Danielsen; Kasper Bergholdt Danielsen; Søren Dam-Heinrichsen	Kerteminde Sejlklub	6	22	19	4	15	6	72	50
6	Suppelajma	John Wulff; Benny Christensen; Johnny Nielsen	Jægerspris Sejlklub	13	5	9	17	21	9	74	53
7	Emma	Siegfried Busse; Uwe Pfuhl; Jens Callsen	Segler Verein Kiel	7	6	32	9	2	BFD 53	109	56
8	Nadia	Kim Kristensen; Leif Pipper; Carsten Enger	Jægerspris Sejlklub	8	21	20	7	12	11	79	58
9	Borte med Blesten	Ernst Gäde; Fabian Gäde; Jörg Niklas	Yacht Club Strande	9	13	10	15	16	17	80	63
10	Caribe	Friedrich Mahrt; René Bastian; Werner Buch	Missunder Yacht Club	30	7	40	6	7	14	104	64
11	Lillevi	Michael Fehlandt; Holli Dittrich; Carsten Gerdes-Götz	Entdecker- und Seefahrer-Förder-Vereinigung	16	24	4	13	BFD 53	8	118	65
12	Sofie	Per Røssel; Kasper Berens; Mikael Bruun	Faaborg Sejlklub	36	9	6	37	9	7	104	67
13	Private Lady	Jens Thurøe; Knud Peter Andersen; Sisi Buch	Kerteminde Sejlklub	2	32	7	33	26	5	105	72
14	Geppeline	Per Buch; Hans Schultz; Per Puck	Kerteminde Sejlklub	14	30	3	23	4	BFD 53	127	74
15	Tricky Trickster	Michael Belvad; Niklas Nielsen; Flemming Dahlhof Jensen	Aarhus Sejlklub	35	3	35	10	13	13	109	74
16	Idefix	Carl-Otto Hedegaard; Peter Secher; Ole Hjaltelin	Kolding Sejlklub	41	18	25	11	5	15	115	74
17	Paula	Walther Furthmann; Hans Christian Mrowka; Gunnar Ceccotti	Yacht Club Strande	5	17	24	35	19	10	110	75
18	Chess	Henrik Kold; Julie Kold; Henrik Holk	Kerteminde Sejlklub	23	25	2	34	25	4	113	79
19	Chiquita	Christoph Nielsen; Torben Dehn; Gunter May	Seglervereinigung 1903 Berlin	1	14	15	5	BFD 53	BFD 53	141	88
20	Caboré	Joachim Bleifuß; Udo Hompesch; Klaus Kahl	Schlei-Segel-Club	22	40	13	2	11	BFD 53	141	88
21	Ka´nok	Henrik Møhl; Ellen Møhl; Thomas Møhl	Kerteminde Sejlklub	OCS 53	16	8	14	32	21	144	91
22	passais	Andreas Granlund; Bent Mallemuk Nielsen; Milton Smith	Haderslev Sejl Club	21	23	43	OCS 53	10	2	152	99
23	Proud Mary	Per Bøgelund; Lars Meinert Møller; Henriette Hansen	Kerteminde Sejlklub	10	39	22	16	31	25	143	104
24	La Pampri	Herman Saari; Aleksi Lehtonen; Anssi Ryökäs	Naantalin Purjehdusseura	20	47	27	29	6	23	152	105
25	gækken	Glenn Christoffersen; Torben Pedersen; Steen Thorvaldsson	Faaborg Sejlklub	4	12	37	36	28	33	150	113
26	Tibbe Tak	Erik Andreasen; Lotte Andreasen; Eilif Ladegaard	Kerteminde Sejlklub	15	33	23	20	30	30	151	118
27	Frostboxen	Jakob Frost; Michael Møller; Anders Bangsgaard	Faaborg Sejlklub	26	31	18	27	17	BFD 53	172	119
28	Skarven	Annette Bauer-Brandl; Anders Sunke; Jørgen Mohr Ernst	Kerteminde Sejlklub	19	28	34	18	23	36	158	122
29	Meltemia	Klaus Blenckner; Harald von Saurma Graf; Ulli Zahn	Segelclub Eckernförde	12	20	16	43	33	BFD 53	177	124
30	Emilie	Lennart Magnusson; Anders Lindberg; Gustaf Magnusson	Långedrags Segelsällskap	24	46	BFD 53	21	14	22	180	127
31	Gollum	Gustav Gilbert Nielsen; Henrik Munk; Finn Larsen	Jægerspris Sejlklub	38	11	26	38	27	26	166	128
32	Oberstinden	Per Damm; Peter Overgaard; Jesper Bach Henriksen	Kastrup Sejlklub	44	10	42	40	22	19	177	133
33	Windansea Minor	David Wilson; Marnie Roach; Edward Walker	St. Francis Yacht Club	27	8	41	30	29	BFD 53	188	135
34	Smilla	Bjarne Marcussen; Sune Hinz; Alex Lindegaard	Faaborg Sejlklub	37	36	21	41	24	18	177	136
35	Rennschnecke	Fritz Schaarschmidt; Martin Lewin; Björge Dehn	Segelclub Eckernförde	32	27	33	24	20	BFD 53	189	136
36	Quling	Mats Duvander; Erika Jeppsson; Mats Cederholm	Ystads Segelsällskap	31	42	14	39	36	20	182	140
37	Honk	Gerhard Fenger; Thorsten Illing; Arne Kuhr	Schlei-Segel-Club	40	19	38	26	38	27	188	148
38	Not Known	Ado Jardine; Bill Dunsdon; Jeremy Austin	Royal Lymington Yacht Club	46	37	11	31	41	31	197	151
39	Nyfiken Gul	Ulf Bengtsson; Martin Gröndahl; Axel Danielsson	Halmstads Segelsällskap	48	34	30	28	42	24	206	158
40	Kong Fus	Erik Køster; Jan Machholm; Kristian Aarup	Kerteminde Sejlklub	29	26	29	22	DNF 53	BFD 53	212	159
41	Gisti	Ditte Andreasen; Anders Jonas Pedersen; Eric Kaiser	Sundby Sejlforening	42	38	36	46	18	35	215	169
42	Havfrøknen	Erland Sperlig; Jørgen G. Andersen; Carl Aage Grosen	Aarhus Sejlklub	43	41	17	42	44	28	215	171
43	Positive	Petri Vuorjoki; Kristina von Knorring; Kai Aarnio	Helsingfors Segelklubb	28	29	28	OCS 53	34	BFD 53	225	172
44	Astrea	Thomas Clausen; Søren Andersen; George Cathey	Kerteminde Sejlklub	25	45	46	32	37	37	222	176
45	ta`fri	Andreas Christiansen; Knud Christiansen; Vincent Buesch	Flensburger Segelclub	39	44	39	45	35	29	231	186
46	Siiri	Heta Järvimaa Luoto; Johanna Horsma; Karoliina Peippo	Helsingfors Segelklubb	34	48	DNE 53	25	43	32	235	187
47	Bly Viol	Jan Hinnerk Alberti; Urte Jona Alberti; Christoph Alberti	Segler-Vereinigung Flensburg	33	50	45	44	40	34	246	196
48	No Brakes	Michael Goebel; Björn Axel Johansson; Donald Bratt	Bay View Boat Club	45	35	47	19	DNF 53	BFD 53	252	199
49	Snudd	Leif Ahlquist; Claes Hoglert; Niels Hedin	Vikingarnas Segelsällskap	47	43	44	OCS 53	39	BFD 53	279	226
50	Renny	Stefan Rennebeck; Ilka Hartmann; Ralph Prüssmann	Hamburger Segel-Club	50	51	49	47	BFD 53	38	288	235
51	TBA	Richard Keldsen; Al Jolly; Don Moser	St. Francis Yacht Club	49	49	48	OCS 53	45	DNC 53	297	244
52	Svea	Svante Svensson; Boije Svensson	Halmstads Segelsällskap	DNC 53	DNC 53	DNC 53	DNC 53	DNC 53	DNC 53	318	265

Legend: BFD – Black flag disqualification; DNC – Did not come to the starting area; DNE – Non excludable disqualification; DNF – Did not finish; DNS – Did not start; OCS – On the course side of the starting line;
