= James Dexter Ledbetter House =

Historic house in North Carolina, United States

- U.S. National Register of Historic Places
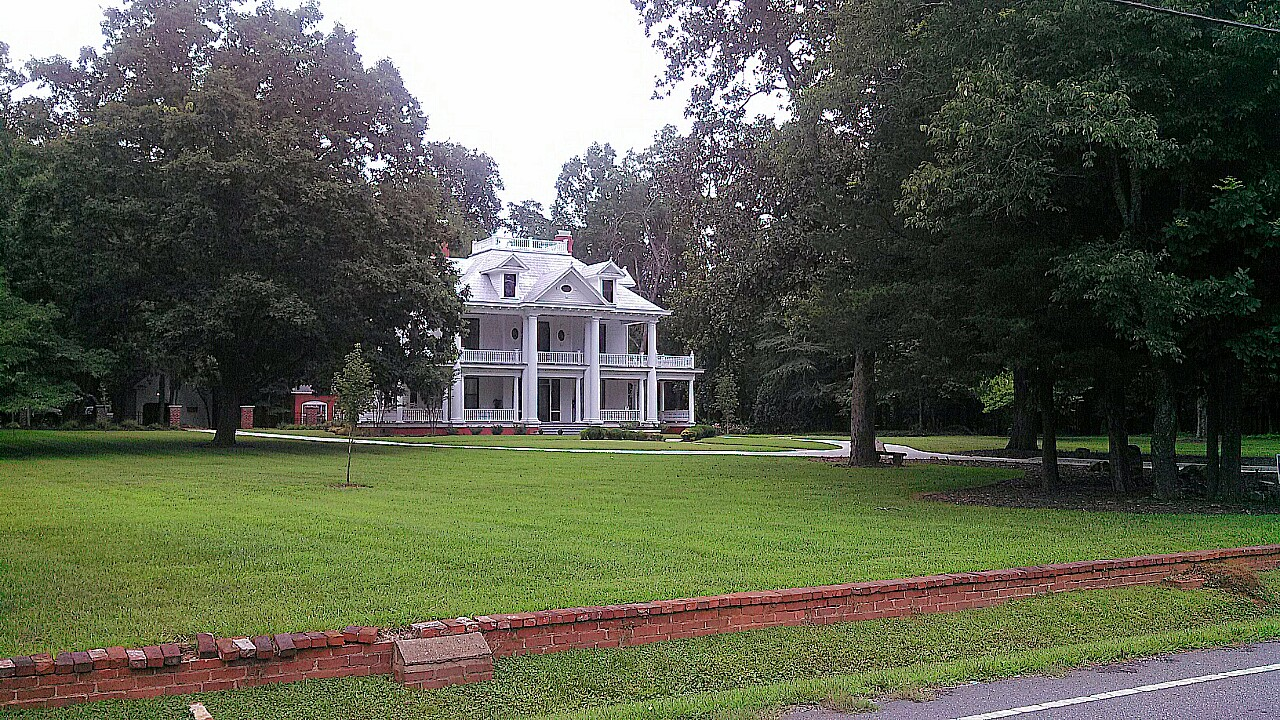
- James Ledbetter House, July 2013

- Location within North Carolina Location within the United States
- Location: Off U.S. Route 74, near Forest City, North Carolina
- Coordinates: 35°21′11″N 81°54′06″W
- Area: 15.7 acres (6.4 ha)
- Built: 1914
- Built by: Ledbetter, James Dexter; Baynard, James Andrew
- Architectural style: Colonial Revival, Classical Revival, Neo-Classical Revival
- NRHP reference No.: 82003511
- Added to NRHP: June 14, 1982

James Dexter Ledbetter House is a historic home located near Forest City, Rutherford County, North Carolina. It built in 1914, and is a 2 1/2-story, three-bay, double pile frame dwelling with Classical Revival and Colonial Revival style design elements. It sits on a low brick foundation and has a hipped roof. The front facade features a two-story engaged portico supported by Tuscan order columns, with a one-story wraparound section also supported by Tuscan columns.

It was added to the National Register of Historic Places in 1982.
