= East Main Street Historic District (Forest City, North Carolina) =

Historic district in North Carolina, United States

- U.S. National Register of Historic Places
- U.S. Historic district
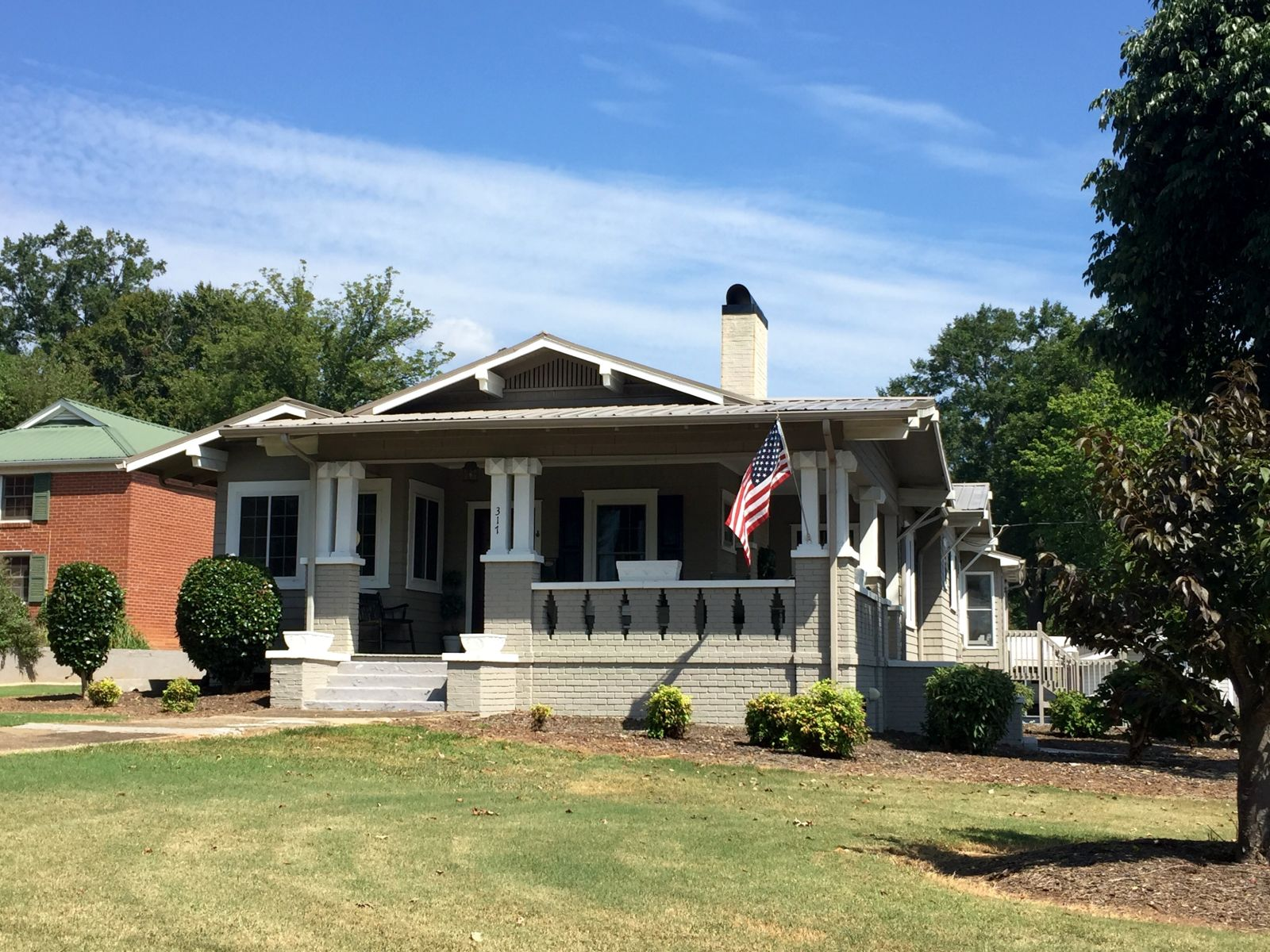
- 317 E. Main St., 2016

- Location within North Carolina Location within the United States
- Location: Roughly along parts of Arlington St., Carolina Ave., N. Magnolia St., S. Magnolia St., E. Main St., McBrayer Court, Forest City, North Carolina
- Coordinates: 35°19′56″N 81°51′16″W
- Area: 42 acres (17 ha)
- Built: 1914
- Architect: Roberts, Leah Range; Leemon, Clarence M.
- Architectural style: Bungalow/craftsman, Colonial Revival
- NRHP reference No.: 05001450
- Added to NRHP: December 23, 2005

East Main Street Historic District is a national historic district located at Forest City, Rutherford County, North Carolina. It encompasses 115 contributing buildings and 3 contributing structures in a predominantly residential section of Forest City. The district developed after 1914, and includes notable examples of Colonial Revival and Bungalow / American Craftsman style architecture. Located in the district is the separately listed T. Max Watson House. Other notable buildings include the Brown-Griffith House (1923), Dr. W. C. Bostic Jr. House (1926), John W. and Bertha M. Dalton House (1939), J. H. Thomas House (1922), and the Marley Sigmon House (1962).

It was added to the National Register of Historic Places in 2005.

== Gallery ==
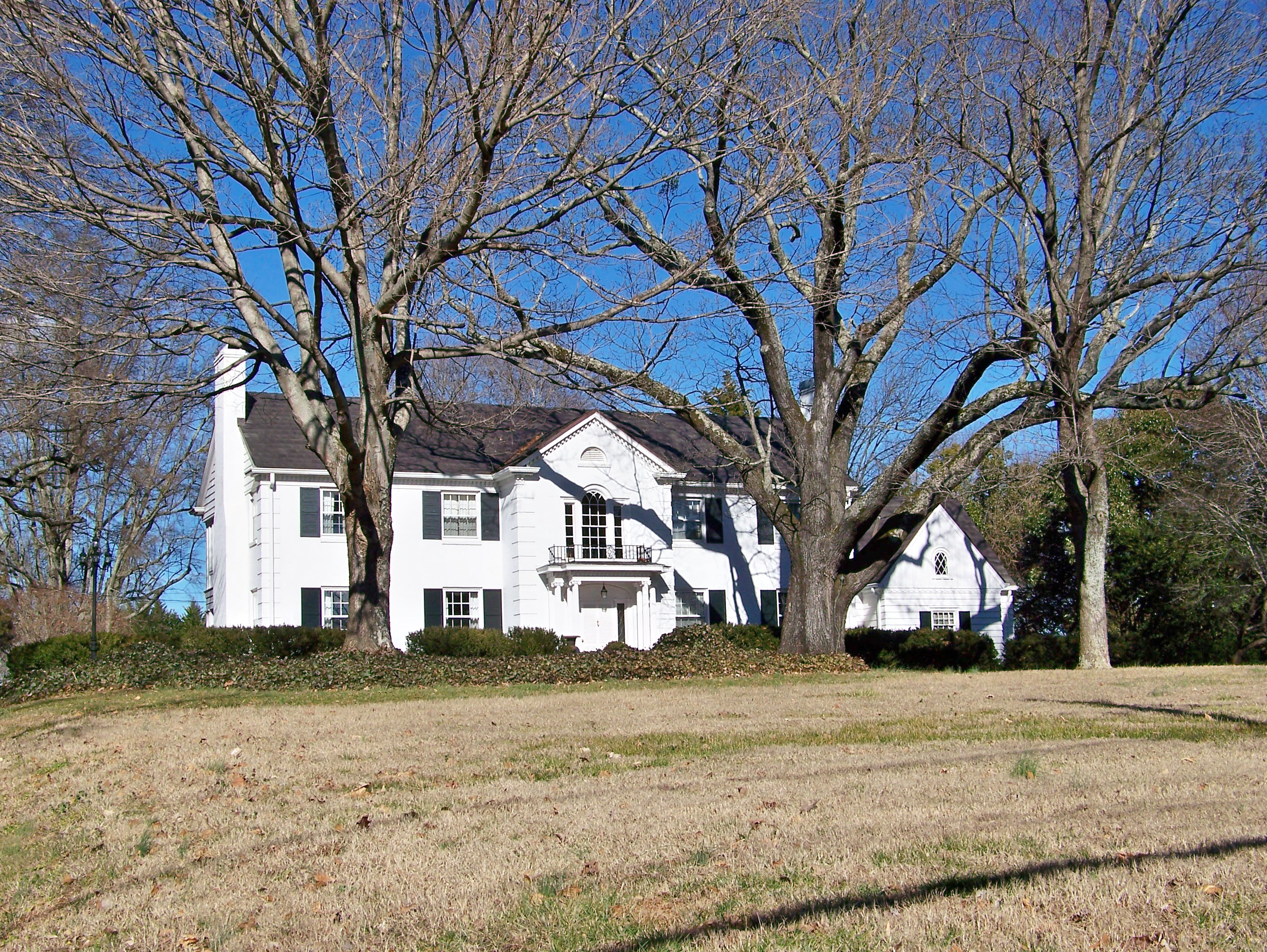
T. Max Watson House, 2014

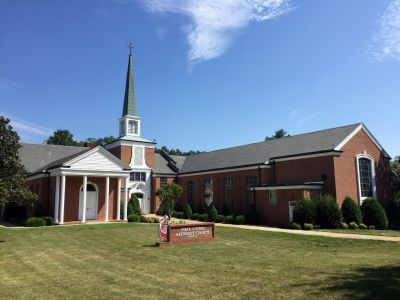
First United Methodist Church, 2016

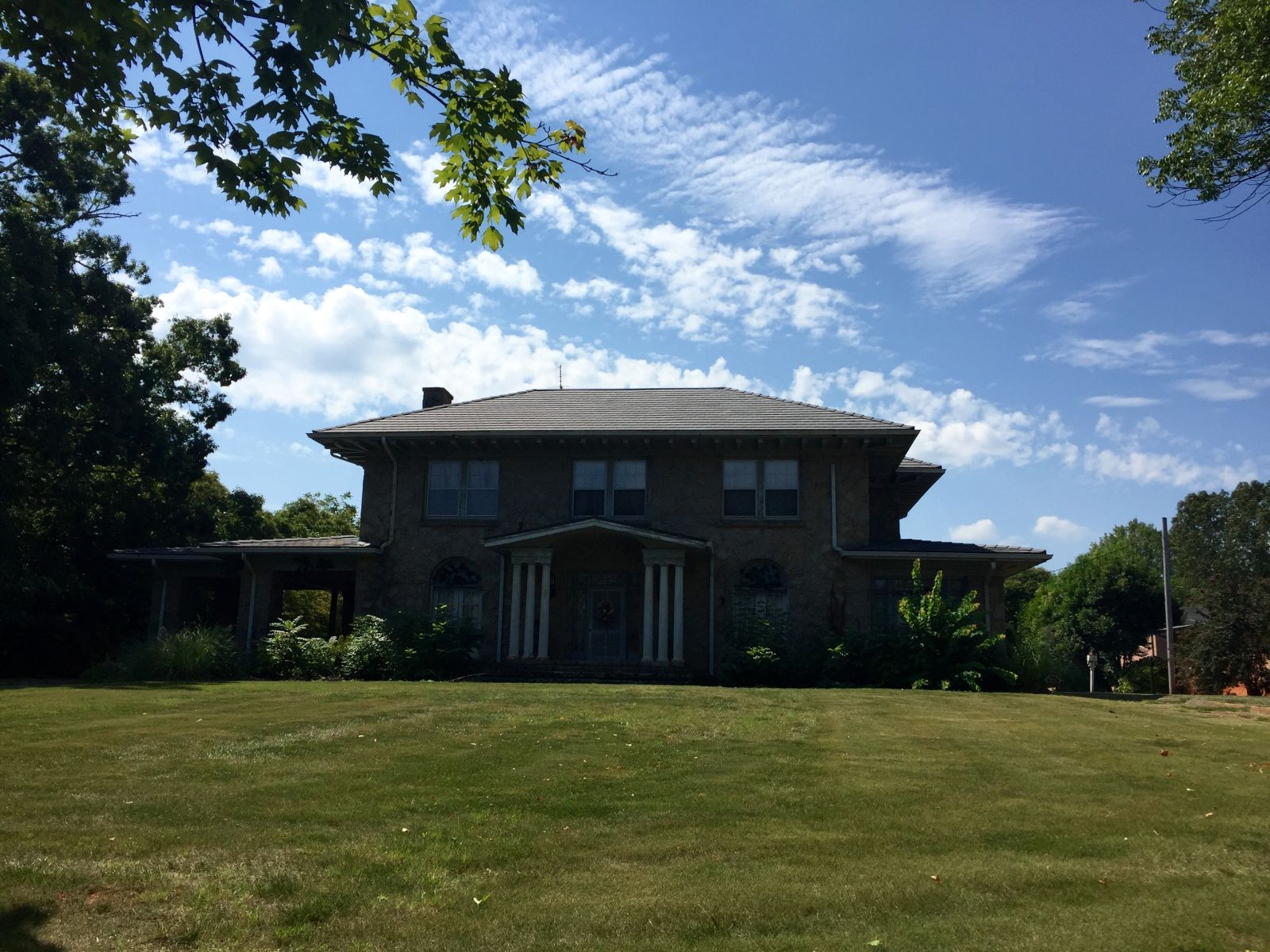
J.H. Thomas House, 2016
