= Bechtler =

Bechtler is a surname. Notable people with the surname include:

- Christopher Bechtler (1782–1843), German-born American goldsmith and watchmaker
- Hildegard Bechtler (born 1951), German costume and set designer

== See also ==
- Bechtler Museum of Modern Art, Museums in Charlotte, North Carolina
