= Hickory Nut Gorge State Trail =

State trail in North Carolina, United States

Hickory Nut Gorge Trail
- Length: 0 miles (0 km)
- Location: North Carolina, United States
- Established: 2017
- Designation: State Trail (North Carolina)
- Use: Hiking
- Season: Year-round
- Sights: Lake Lure, Chimney Rock
- Surface: Natural
- Maintained by: Conserving Carolina
- Website: https://conservingcarolina.org/hickory-nut-gorge-trail/ https://trails.nc.gov/state-trails/hickory-nut-gorge-state-trail

Hickory Nut Gorge State Trail is a unit of the North Carolina state park system in Rutherford, Buncombe, and Henderson Counties, North Carolina in the United States. The State Trail is planned as a continuous loop for hikers around Hickory Nut Gorge. The trail is a collaboration between Conserving Carolina, a nonprofit regional conservation organization, and the state, with development coordinated by the North Carolina Division of Parks and Recreation (NCDPR) and Conserving Carolina.

== History ==
In 2005, the General Assembly of North Carolina established Hickory Nut Gorge State Park near the Town of Lake Lure. Later that year, the Carolina Mountain Land Conservancy (now named Conserving Carolina) and The Nature Conservancy assisted the state with the first acquisition of land for the park.

In 2007, the privately owned Chimney Rock Park was purchased by the state as an expansion for the park, and Hickory Nut Gorge State Park was renamed Chimney Rock State Park as a result.

During the master planning process for Chimney Rock State Park in 2011, a regional hiking trail network was proposed which would connect the various tracts of state park land, local parks and would loop around Lake Lure.

On June 15, 2015, the General Assembly formalized the proposed trail network by establishing Hickory Nut Gorge State Trail, and directed NCDPR to coordinate its development.

Conserving Carolina envisions a 100+ mile network of connected trails in the Hickory Nut Gorge. As of 2023, the organization had opened more than 38 miles of the trail to the public and had several trail expansions under development.
