= Rutherford County Sheriff's Office (NC) =

Local law enforcement agency

Sheriff of Rutherford County, North Carolina
- Incumbent; Aaron Ellenburg since December 5, 2022
- Seat: Rutherfordton, North Carolina
- Term length: 4 years
- Formation: April 14, 1779
- Salary: $95,509 (2022)

The Rutherford County Sheriff's Office is responsible for patrolling the towns and unincorporated areas of Rutherford County, North Carolina, operating the Detention Center, transporting inmates, securing the court house, executing warrants, serving civil papers, and ensuring public safety. Additionally, the Rutherford County Sheriff is the chief law enforcement officer of the county. The current sheriff is republican Aaron Ellenburg. In 2016, the sheriff's salary was set at $82,555.

Rutherford County Sheriff's Office

Jurisdictional structure
- Operations jurisdiction: Rutherford County, North Carolina
- Area: 566 sq mi (1,470 km2)
- Population: 64,444 (2020)

Operational structure
- Headquarters: 198 N Washington Street, Rutherfordton, North Carolina 28139
- Agency executives: Aaron Ellenburg, Sheriff; Randall Greenway, Chief Deputy; Peter Wan, Major

== Organizational Structure ==
Divisions and units of the Sheriff's Office.

- Administration
- Patrol
- Investigations
  - Detective Unit
  - Forensic Unit
  - Narcotics Unit
- Support Services
  - School Resource Officers
  - Court House Security and Bailiffs
  - Civil Process
  - Warrant Process
- Detention Center
  - Detention Crews
  - Transportation
  - Detention Investigator

== Rank Structure ==
The current rank structure used by the sheriff's office had been in effect since January 2023.

Rank	Insignia	Information	Badge
Sheriff		Elected to four year terms.	Gold
Chief Deputy		Second in command.	Gold
Major		Assists the Sheriff and Chief Deputy in supervising the divisions, completing administrative duties.	Gold
Captain		There are four Captains; one for each major division and one serving as Rutherford County Schools Investigator.	Gold
Lieutenant		In charge of a patrol unit and shift, or assists in detention center administration.	Gold
First Sergeant		Assists the administration of the Detention Center. When the 911 Communications Center was part of the Sheriff's Office, the assistant director held the rank of first sergeant.	Silver
Sergeant		Supervises a unit or crew.	Silver
Corporal		Serves as a school resource officer or supervisor in a unit.	Silver
Deputy / Detective / Detention Officer		Detention Officers are non-sworn employees. Detectives are also known as "investigators".	Silver

The leadership hierarchy as of December 2023:

- Sheriff Aaron Ellenburg
  - Chief Deputy Randall Greenway
    - Major Peter Wan
    - Captain Marc Duncan, Rutherford County Schools Safety Officer
      - Captain Chris Lovelace, Investigations
        - Lieutenant J. Upton, Investigations
        - Sergeant J. Greenway, Forensics
        - Sergeant J. Mode, Narcotics
      - Captain Jamie Keever, Detention Center (and Professional Standards)
        - Lieutenant Patrick Wiseman
          - Detective B. Friend
          - First Sergeant B. Sprouse
            - Sergeant J. Splawn, Detention Crew
            - Sergeant B. Cole, Detention Crew
            - Sergeant M. Logan, Detention Crew
      - Captain Stephen Ellis, Patrol
        - Lieutenant T. Lowery, Patrol Crew A
          - Sergeant J. McComas, Patrol Crew A
        - Lieutenant Allen Hardin, Patrol Crew B
          - Sergeant B. King, Patrol Crew B
        - Lieutenant Corey Smith, Patrol Crew C
          - Sergeant N. Ensley, Patrol Crew C
        - Lieutenant Michael Snyder, Patrol Crew D
          - Sergeant Wilmer Chavez Perez, Patrol Crew D
      - Captain Brian Gooch, Support Services
        - Sergeant A. Greenway, School Resource Officers
        - Sergeant E. Toney, Civil Process
        - Sergeant J. Hoppes, Warrant Process
        - Sergeant B. Hooper, Courthouse Security

== Election of 2022 ==
The race for sheriff began crowded with five people running for office: incumbent Chris Francis (R), Anthony 'Tony' Roberson (R), James 'Aaron' Ellenburg (R), Steve 'Theo' Theodoropoulos (R), and Jason Wease (D). Before the primary election in May 2022, Tony Roberson registered to run unaffiliated, and Chris Francis had dropped out of the race after successfully being elected three times. Aaron Ellenburg won the Republican primary, beating out Theodoropoulos by 2,360 votes. In the Democratic primary, Jason Wease won by default without opposition. Three candidates remained and were on the general election ballot: Aaron Ellenburg (R), Jason Wease (D), and Tony Roberson (U).

After receiving unofficial final election night results from all county precincts, Aaron Ellenburg is the winner of the general election being more than 11,000 votes ahead of Jason Wease and more than 13,000 votes ahead of Tony Roberson. Ellenburg will be sworn in as the 47th Sheriff of Rutherford County on Monday, December 5, 2022 and will serve until the end of the term on Monday, December 7, 2026 per North Carolina General Statute § 163-1.

== Former Sheriffs ==
List of Former Sheriffs of Rutherford County, North Carolina
Sheriff	Term Began	Term Ended	Office Holder
Richard Singleton	1779	1781	1st
Andrew Hampton	1781	1784	2nd
John Lewis	1784	1787	3rd
Jonathan Hampton	1787	1788	4th
William Nevill	1788	1789	5th
James Withrow	1789	1790	6th
Robert Irvine	1790	1792	7th
Abram Irvine	1792	1795	8th
Daniel Camp	1795	1796	9th
James Boyle	1796	1798	10th
William Carson	1798	1809	11th
John Alley	1809	1814	12th
Frederick Alley	1814	1820	13th
Garland Dickerson	1820	1821	14th
William Carson	1821	1836	15th
William Wilkins	1836	1838	16th
James W. Carson	1838	1842	17th
William Wilkins	1842	1846	18th
M.O. Dickerson	1846	1848	19th
Madison Kilpatrick	1848	1856	20th
Andrew B. Long	1856	1860	21st
Martin Walker	1860	1872	22nd
John E. McFarland	1872	1878	23rd
Noah E. Walker	1878	1884	24th
John B. Blanton	1884	1888	25th
G.W. Long	1888	1892	26th
Ed Beam	1892	1894	27th
J.V. McFarland	1894	1898	28th
Elijah A. Martin	1898	1908	29th
C.E. Tanner	1908	1918	30th
James W. Beason	1918	1924	31st
W.C. Hardin	1924	1930	32nd
J. Ed McFarland	1930	1932	33rd
Charles C. Moore	1932	1934	34th
J. Ed. McFarland	1934	1936	35th
J. Cal Williams	1936	1938	36th
Charles C. Moore	1938	1946	37th
Vance Wilkins	1946	1958	38th
Damon Huskey	1958	1970	39th
Blane Yelton	1970	1974	40th
Damon Huskey	1974	1986	41st
Edgar Searcy	1986	1990	42nd
Daniel J. Good	1990	2005	43rd
C. Philip Byers	2005	2006	44th
Jack L. Conner	December 4, 2006	December 6, 2010	45th
Chris Francis	December 6, 2010	November 30, 2022	46th
