= John Heywood Alley Jr. =

American military officer and politician

Col. John Heyward Alley Jr.
- Portrait of John Heyward Alley Jr.

State Senator to the North Carolina State Senate
- In office 1858–1860
- In office 1854–1856

Superintendent of Jackson County Common Schools
- In office 1853–1854

Sheriff of Jackson County, North Carolina
- In office 1852–1856

Personal details
- Born: 11 May 1814 Rutherford County, North Carolina, United States
- Died: 3 December 1902 (aged 88) Norton, Jackson County, North Carolina, United States
- Party: Democratic Party (United States)
- Spouse: Sarah Norton (1828-1902)
- Children: 14, including Felix Eugene Alley
- Parent: John Heywood Alley
- Occupation: Politician; Military Officer; Sheriff

Military service
- Allegiance: United States of America; Confederate States of America
- Years of service: 1838-1839; 1846-1848; 1861-1865
- Rank: Colonel
- Commands: North Carolina Confederate Home Guard
- Battles/wars: Cherokee Removal; Mexican American War; Battle of Chapultepec; American Civil War; Stoneman's 1865 Raid

Col. John Heyward Alley Jr. was an American politician, military officer, and sheriff who served in several wars during the 19th century. He was an officer under Winfield Scott during the Trail of Tears and also served during the Mexican American War, and the American Civil War, where he commanded the North Carolina Confederate Home Guard.

== Early life ==
John Heyward Alley Jr. was born to John Heyward Alley and Usilla Hampton in 1814. He was a member of the Alley Family and a distant descendant of William Alley.

== Later life ==
He served in the military during the Cherokee Removal and during the Mexican American War, being promoted after the Battle of Chapultepec. He served as the Confederate Home Guard commander in North Carolina, after losing a leg in the first year of the war, and was later, almost executed for treason by Kirk's Raiders until one of his men who served under him in the Mexican American War saved his life. He also held the roles of Sheriff, State Senator, and School superintendent.
