= T. Max Watson House =

Historic house in North Carolina, United States

- U.S. National Register of Historic Places
- U.S. Historic district – Contributing property
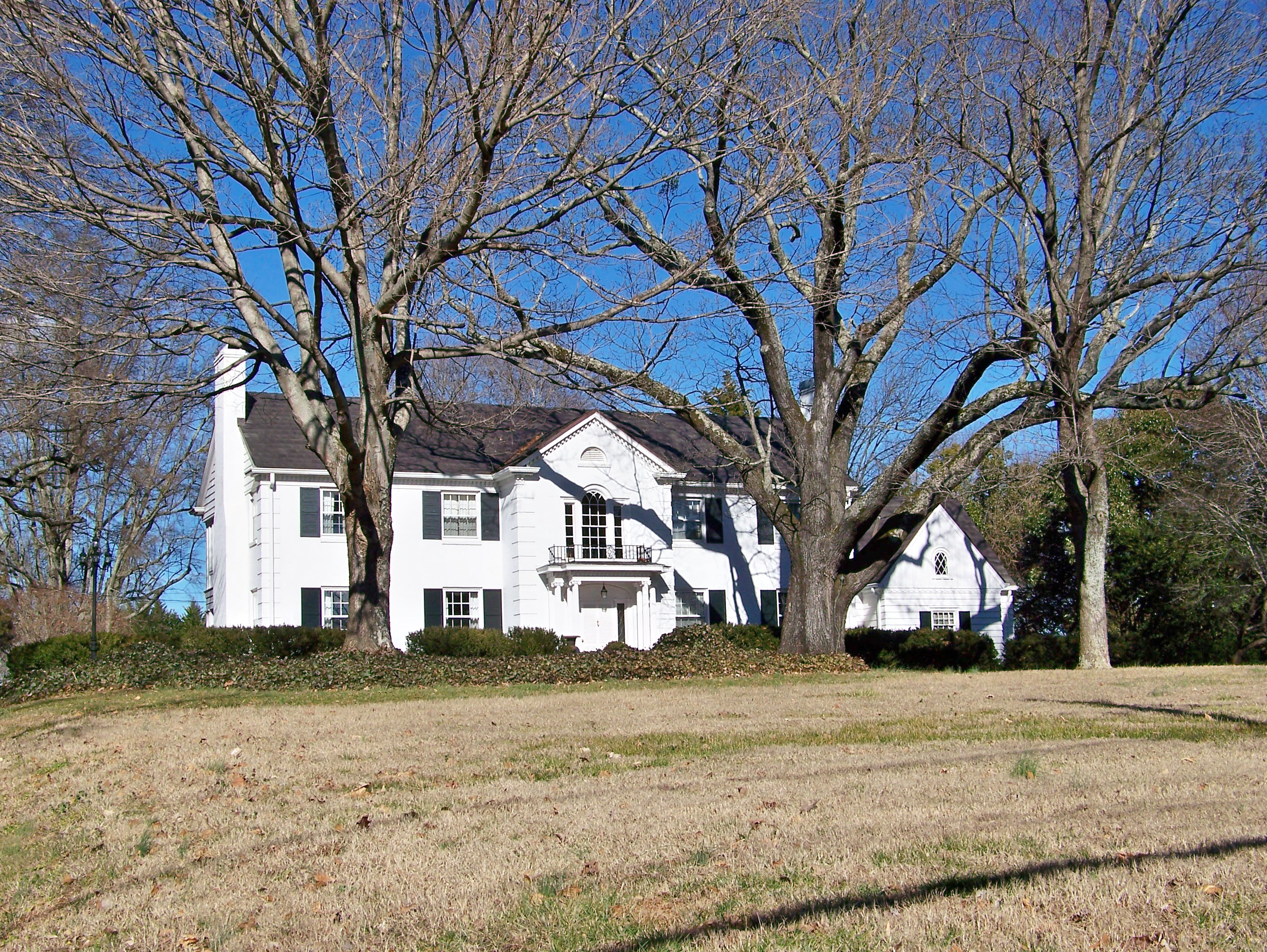
- T. Max Watson House, February 2014

- Location within North Carolina Location within the United States
- Location: 297 E. Main St., Forest City, North Carolina
- Coordinates: 35°19′58″N 81°51′33″W
- Area: 2.1 acres (0.85 ha)
- Built: 1939
- Architectural style: Georgian Revival
- NRHP reference No.: 01001110
- Added to NRHP: October 15, 2001

T. Max Watson House is a historic home located at Forest City, Rutherford County, North Carolina. It built in 1939, and is a two-story, five-bay, central passage plan, Georgian Revival style white brick dwelling. It has a side-gable roof covered with interlocking red clay tiles. The front facade features a central projecting bay, one-story portico supported by three Ionic order columns, and second floor Palladian window.

It was added to the National Register of Historic Places in 2001. It is located in the East Main Street Historic District.
