= Alexander Mills =

Alexander Mills may refer to:

- Alexander Mills, North Carolina, a town in Rutherford County, North Carolina, United States
- Alexander Rud Mills (1885–1964), Australian barrister, author and Nazi sympathiser
- Alexander Mills, Annapolis Midshipman at US Naval Academy. Student and protege.
