= Catheys Creek (North Carolina) =

Body of water in United States of America

Coordinates: 35.21122316°N 82.7831834°W

Catheys Creek is a stream in the U.S. state of North Carolina, and is a tributary of the Second Broad River. It is located in central Rutherford County and originates in an area north of Rutherfordton near the county line with McDowell county. The stream flows southeast until it reaches and joins with the Second Broad River. Not to be confused with the Catheys Creek in Transylvania County, North Carolina that is a tributary to the French Broad River.

Lewis, Harris, and Mill Creeks are tributaries to Catheys Creek.

== Conservation ==
Both Catheys Creek and its tributaries Hollands and Mill Creeks, are on North Carolina Clean Water Act 303(d) List of Impaired Waters due to biological impairment. Incised and eroding streams, excessive sedimentation, stormwater impacts and fecal coliform bacteria are common.

The NC Ecosystem Enhancement Program, now the NC Division of Mitigation Services, selected Catheys Creek for a formal Local Watershed Plan in 2005. The Plan found degraded conditions throughout the watershed with excessive erosion and sedimentation. Key stressors were found to be stormwater impacts, livestock access to streams, and fecal coliform bacteria contamination. The dumping of solid waste and dyes into Case Branch and Reynolds Creek were also documented. Sites downstream of Spindale had higher metals, fecal coliform bacteria, and turbidity. A possible source is the Spindale Wastewater Treatment Plant.

There are one major and two minor NPDES facilities that discharge into Catheys Creek or its tributaries. The Town of Spindale’s Wastewater Treatment Plan discharges 6 million gallons per day to Catheys Creek, below the mouth of Hollands Creek. The facility has a history of numerous violations, with 52 violations between December 1994 and July 2005, including exceedances of total suspended solids (TSS), biochemical oxygen demand (BOD), ammonia-nitrogen, and total nickel. The United World Mission Treatment Plant discharges into an unnamed tributary to Cherry Creek, a tributary to Catheys Creek. This facility had 44 violations between December 1994 and July 2005. The White Oak Manor – Rutherfordton Treatment Plant discharges into an unnamed tributary that meets with Catheys Creek about one mile above Highway US 64. This minor discharger had two violations between 1995 and 2005. Sedimentation from the urban areas of Rutherfordton and Spindale is a major habitat quality problem in the Catheys Creek watershed.

== History ==
Catheys Creek was named for George Cathey, a revolutionary war soldier who owned roughly 300 acres along the creek.

== Lake ==
Catheys Creek passes through a lake at the intersection with Harris Creek in the Thermal City area of Union Mills. The 41-acre lake was built in 1995 and is known as Second Broad River Watershed Dam #2 (Federal ID NC05440). The dam has a high Hazard Potential Classification. The lake has an earthen dam with a stone core and an uncontrolled spillway with 36-inch concrete conduit, where Catheys Creek and Harris Creek exits the Lake.

== Gallery ==
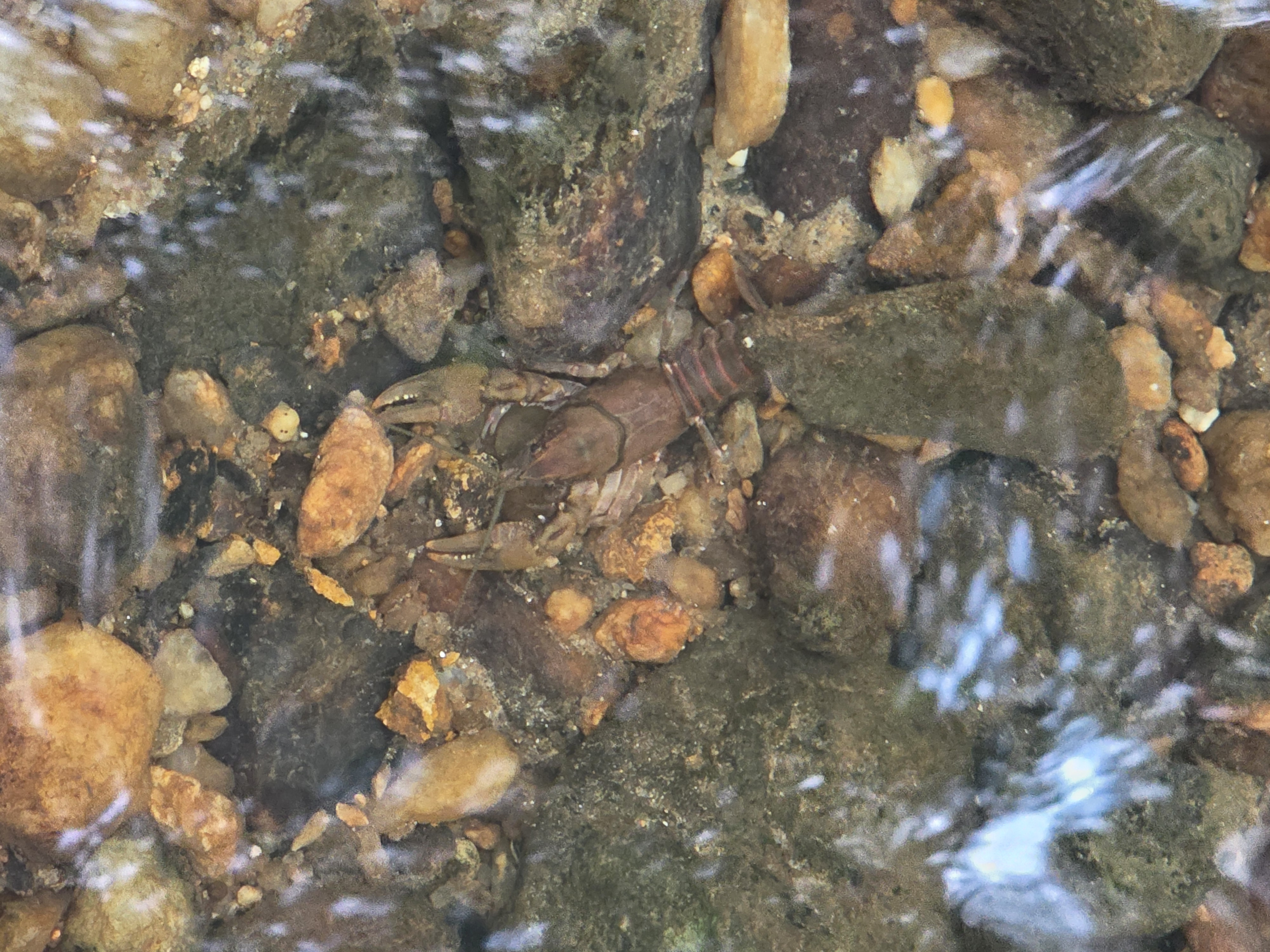

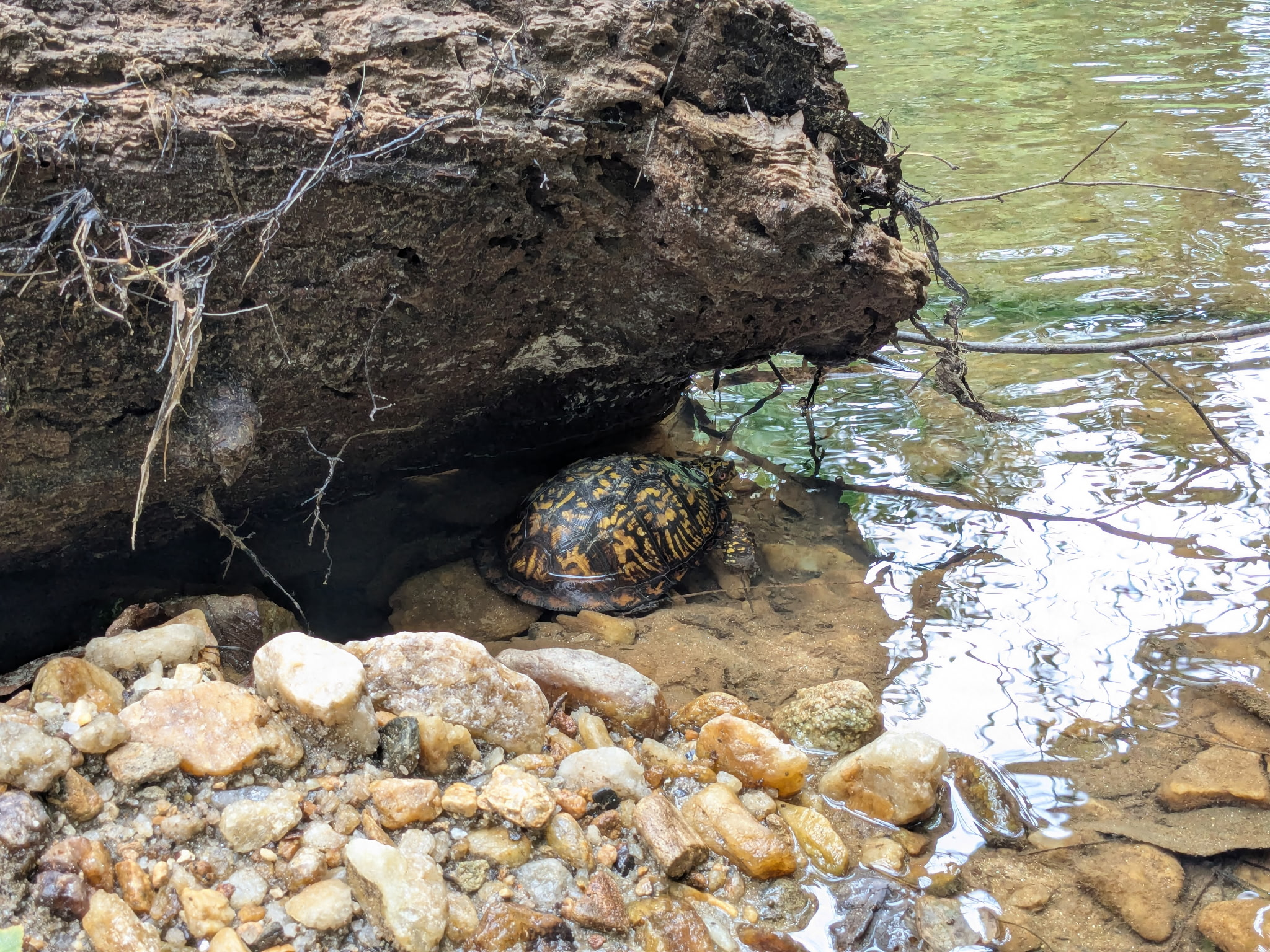

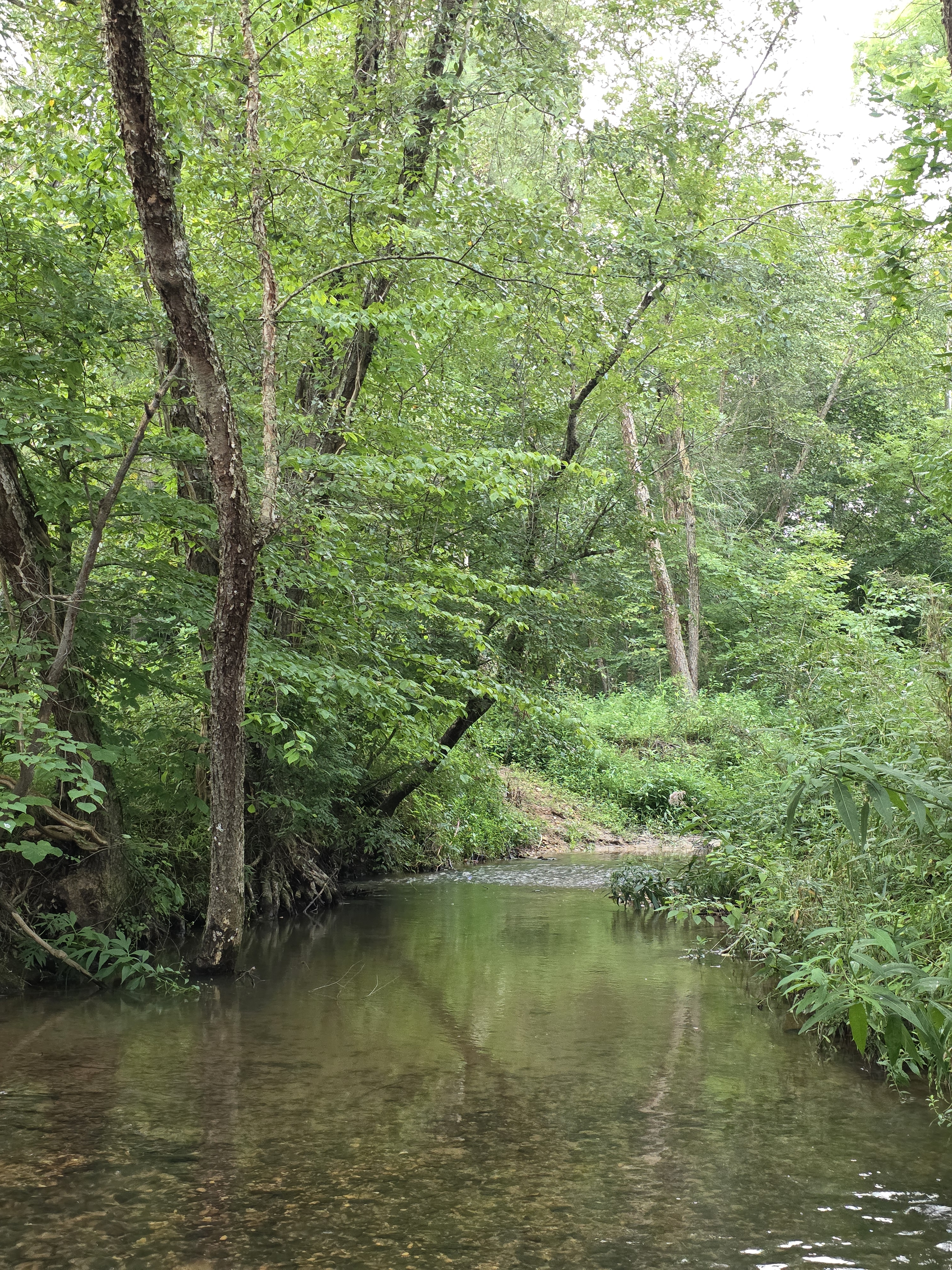
