= John Heywood Alley =

North Carolina Sheriff and politician

Member of the North Carolina General Assembly
- In office 1817–1818

Sheriff of Rutherford County, North Carolina
- In office 1809–1814

Personal details
- Born: 28 December 1778 Iredell County, North Carolina, United States
- Died: 1850 (aged 71–72) Rutherford County, North Carolina, United States
- Spouse: Urcilla Walker
- Children: 7, including John Heywood Alley Jr.
- Occupation: Politician, Sheriff

Military service
- Battles/wars: War of 1812

John Heywood Alley was an American politician and sheriff from North Carolina. He was the father of John Heywood Alley Jr., a confederate commander and state politician. His brother, Frederick Freeman Alley became sheriff after him.

== Life ==
John Heywood Alley was born in 1778 to Shadrack Alley and Mary Price. He married Urcilla Walker and had 7 children, including John Heywood Alley Jr.. He served as sheriff of Rutherford County, North Carolina from 1809 to 1814, and later served as a member of the North Carolina General Assembly from 1817 to 1818. He also served in the War of 1812 as a militia officer.
