= Forest City, North Carolina =

Town in the United States

- Town
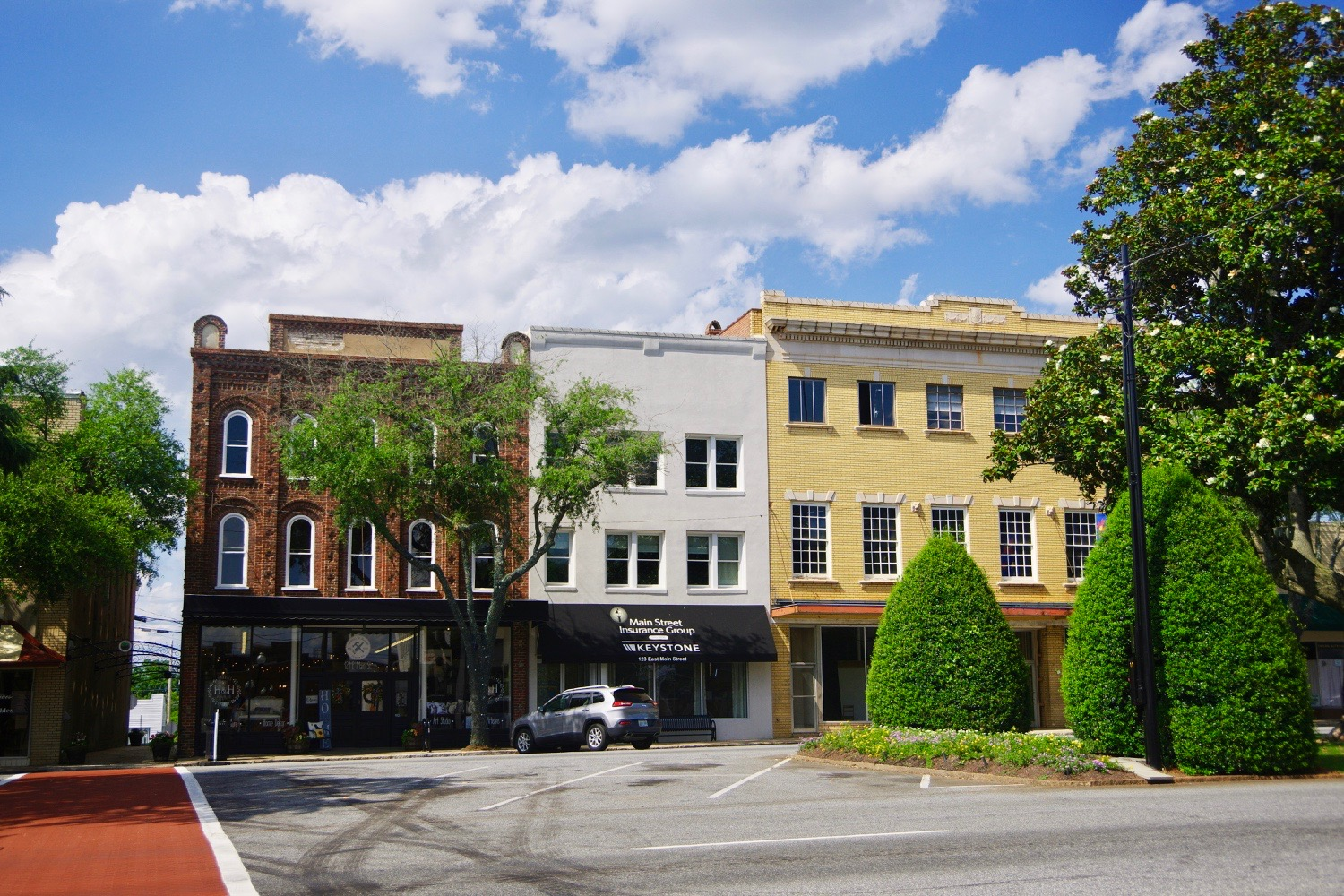
- Main Street

- Seal

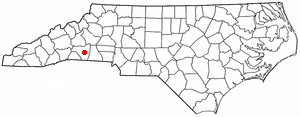
- Location of Forest City, North Carolina
- Coordinates: 35°20′02″N 81°52′13″W
- Country: United States
- State: North Carolina
- County: Rutherford

Area
  - Total: 8.58 sq mi (22.23 km^{2})
  - Land: 8.57 sq mi (22.19 km^{2})
  - Water: 0.015 sq mi (0.04 km^{2})
- Elevation: 1,011 ft (308 m)

Population (2020)
  - Total: 7,377
  - Density: 861/sq mi (332.4/km^{2})
- Time zone: UTC-5 (Eastern (EST))
  - Summer (DST): UTC-4 (EDT)
- ZIP code: 28043
- Area code: 828
- FIPS code: 37-24080
- GNIS feature ID: 2406505
- Website: www.townofforestcity.com

Forest City, formerly known as "Burnt Chimney", is a town in Rutherford County, North Carolina, United States. The population was 7,377 as of the 2020 census, making it the most populous municipality in the county.

== History ==
The Alexander Manufacturing Company Mill Village Historic District, Cool Springs High School, East Main Street Historic District, Forest City Baptist Church, James Dexter Ledbetter House, Main Street Historic District, T. Max Watson House, and West Main Street Historic District are listed on the National Register of Historic Places. The Forest City lynching took place there in 1900.

== Geography ==
Forest City lies along a merged stretch of U.S. Route 221A and U.S. Route 74 Bus. This merged highway widens into a four-lane boulevard as it passes through the town's historic district. The town of Spindale borders Forest City to the west, and the town of Bostic lies just to the northeast.

According to the United States Census Bureau, the town has a total area of 8.2 square miles (21 km^{2}), of which 8.2 square miles (21 km^{2}) are land and 0.04-square-mile (0.10 km^{2}) (0.24%) is water.

In 1999, Alexander Mills merged with and became a part of Forest City.

== Demographics ==
Historical population
Census	Pop.	Note	%±
1880	110		—
1890	419		280.9%
1900	1,090		160.1%
1910	1,592		46.1%
1920	2,312		45.2%
1930	4,069		76.0%
1940	5,035		23.7%
1950	4,971		−1.3%
1960	6,556		31.9%
1970	7,179		9.5%
1980	7,688		7.1%
1990	7,475		−2.8%
2000	7,549		1.0%
2010	7,476		−1.0%
2020	7,377		−1.3%
2022 (est.)	7,162	▼	−2.9%
U.S. Decennial Census

=== 2020 census ===
Forest City racial composition
Race	Number	Percentage
White (non-Hispanic)	4,444	60.24%
Black or African American (non-Hispanic)	1,539	20.86%
Native American	17	0.23%
Asian	83	1.13%
Pacific Islander	6	0.08%
Other/Mixed	447	6.06%
Hispanic or Latino	841	11.4%

As of the 2020 census, there were 7,377 people, 3,128 households, and 1,582 families residing in the town.

The median age was 39.5 years. 24.0% of residents were under the age of 18 and 18.0% were 65 years of age or older. For every 100 females there were 87.2 males, and for every 100 females age 18 and over there were 83.7 males age 18 and over.

98.6% of residents lived in urban areas, while 1.4% lived in rural areas.

Of all households, 30.6% had children under the age of 18 living in them. Of all households, 32.1% were married-couple households, 21.1% were households with a male householder and no spouse or partner present, and 39.5% were households with a female householder and no spouse or partner present. About 35.1% of all households were made up of individuals, and 14.5% had someone living alone who was 65 years of age or older.

There were 3,511 housing units, of which 12.4% were vacant. The homeowner vacancy rate was 3.8% and the rental vacancy rate was 5.4%.

=== Demographic estimates ===
Forest City made up 0.002% of the total U.S. population and 0.07% of the total North Carolina population in 2014. From 2014 to 2018, the percentage of people aged 5 or older who spoke a language other than English at home was 8.4%. The population density in 2014 was 853.12 per square mile (p/mi^{2}). The number of veterans recorded from 2014 to 2018 was 278, and the percentage of foreign-born persons was 3.6%.

From 2014 to 2018, the average household size was 2.23.

=== Income and poverty ===
The median household income from 2014 to 2018, in 2018 dollars, was $27,861. The per capita income for the prior 12 months, as recorded from 2014 to 2018, was $17,716. The percentage of persons in poverty was 31.8%.

== Government ==
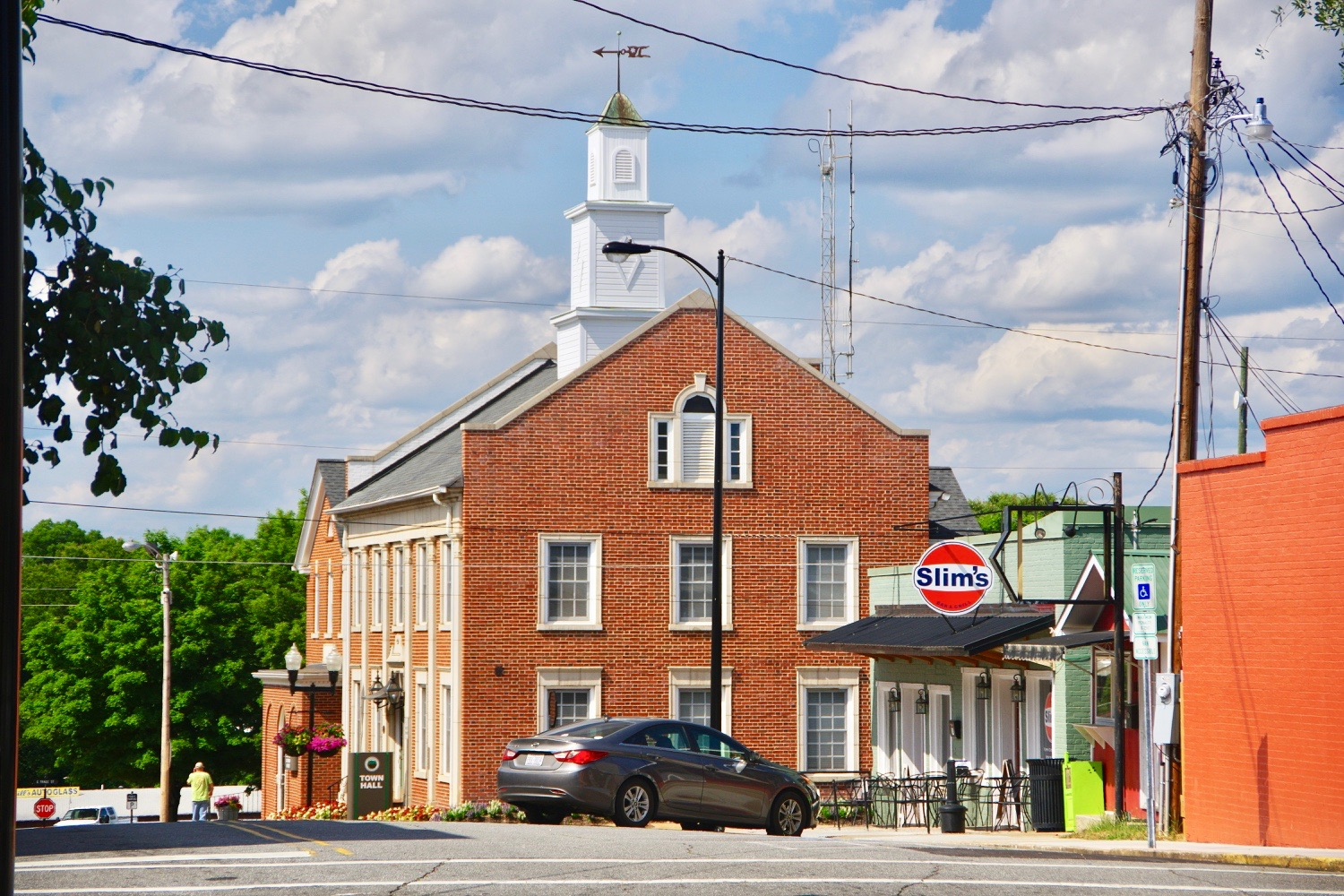
Town hall

The Town of Forest City is governed by a mayor and a board of commissioners. Steve Holland is currently serving as the mayor of The Town of Forest City. The Town Board of Commissioners includes: Mayor Pro Tempore Dr. Dee Dee Bright, Commissioner Chris Lee, Commissioner Shawn Moore, Commissioner Joey Brandle, and Commissioner Dr. John Mark Bennett. The Board of Commissioners appoints a town manager to serve as chief administrator. The current town manager is Janet Mason who has served since September 1, 2019.

In 1929 the mayor was Charles Z. Flack. He is noted for building the original City Hall and was the first mayor to begin the tradition of decorating Main St. by stringing Christmas lights over the road.

== Attractions ==
Forest City has several museums, including the Rutherford County Farm Museum and the Carolina Arcade Museum.

Forest City is also home to the Forest City Owls baseball club which is a member of the Coastal Plain League, a collegiate summer league.

== Education ==
The local school district is Rutherford County Schools, which is based in Forest City.

== Higher education ==
Isothermal Community College is located close by in Spindale, NC. The tuition ranges from $131.00 to $1,281.00 depending on the number of credit hours. The college provides the Lee L. Powers Service Scholarship to those who reside in Rutherford or Polk Counties and receive in-state tuition which will cover all costs of attending the college.

== Economy ==
In 2010, Forest City was selected as the location for a new $450 million data center for Facebook.

Renovations done to the town in 2019 added Forest City Pavilion on Park Square. The venue was designed by Odom Engineering, PLLC. This was a multimillion-dollar project that was undertaken by the town that attracts tourists and increased the value of surrounding homes.

The Thermal Belt Rail Trail project, a bike and walking trail spanning 13.36 miles, was completed, in part, to develop the town's economy.

The Rutherford County Chamber of Commerce and Rutherford County Economic Development partnered to offer an Emergency Small Business Assistance Grant in response to the pandemic caused by the spread of COVID-19. The grant provides a maximum of $2,500 per company.

The total percentage of people aged 16 and older in Forest City that made up the labor force according to the census reported from 2014 to 2018 was 48.7%. The percentage of women recorded in the labor force aged 16 or older was 45.9% from 2014 to 2018 according to information provided by the census. The total number of people that received health care and social assistance receipts/revenue in 2012 ($1,000) was 87,506. The total retail sales reported in 2012 ($1,000) was 403,012.

== Notable people ==
- Woody Abernathy – former MLB pitcher
- Christine A. Franklin – statistics educator
- Todd Coffey – former MLB pitcher
- John McFadden – former NASCAR driver
- Rob Gray – professional basketball player
- Venson Hamilton – professional basketball player
- Bob McNair – businessman, philanthropist, and sports executive
- William Chivous Bostic Sr. – physician and researcher
- Omarion Hampton - NFL football player
