= Union Mills, North Carolina =

- Unincorporated community
- Location within North Carolina Location within the United States
- Coordinates: 35°29′16″N 81°57′48″W
- Country: United States
- State: North Carolina
- County: Rutherford
- Elevation: 1,076 ft (328 m)
- Time zone: UTC-5 (Eastern (EST))
  - Summer (DST): UTC-4 (EDT)
- ZIP code: 28167
- Area code: 828
- GNIS feature ID: 1023042

Union Mills is an unincorporated community in Rutherford County, North Carolina, United States. The community is located along Hudlow Road, east of U.S. Route 221 and 8.2 miles (13.2 km) north of Rutherfordton. Union Mills has a post office with ZIP code 28167.
