= Corinth, Rutherford County, North Carolina =

Corinth, North Carolina
- Unincorporated community
- Location within North Carolina Location within the United States
- Coordinates: 35°21′41″N 81°47′48″W
- Country: United States
- State: North Carolina
- County: Rutherford
- Elevation: 1,014 ft (309 m)
- Time zone: UTC-5 (Eastern (EST))
  - Summer (DST): UTC-4 (EDT)
- Area code: 828
- GNIS feature ID: 983550

Corinth is an unincorporated community in Rutherford County, North Carolina, United States. Corinth is 2.2 miles (3.5 km) east of Bostic.
