= Forest City lynching =

1900 lynching of an African-American in North Carolina

- Date: August 29, 1900
- Location: Forest City, North Carolina

The lynching of Avery Mills in Forest City, North Carolina took place on August 29, 1900. The day before being lynched, Mills, an African-American farmer, had been arrested for shooting his landlord Mills Higgins Flack in self-defense. His pregnant wife Raney Mills was also arrested but was not lynched because of her pregnancy. She was subsequently convicted of second degree murder for the shooting of Flack and served a year of her sentence before being pardoned by Governor Charles B. Aycock.

== Historical background ==
After the conclusion of the Civil War, deep tensions emerged in the South as its economy underwent a massive transformation. Landowning white farmers saw their fortunes decline as interest rates rose and crop prices decreased, meanwhile large numbers of landless African-American and white laborers were forced into the predatory dynamic of tenant farming. Tenant farmers in the South worked under a crop-lien system that saw them saddled by debt and forced into indentured servitude.

The industrialization of the South, proliferation of cotton mills, and exploitation of tenant farmers did not bring much wealth to small farm owners, who grew increasingly frustrated with the political and economic conditions of the day. Many white voters were dissatisfied with the ruling Democratic Party, whose policies mostly served to enrich factory owning elites. In response to this, the Democratic Party began a campaign of increasingly populist and white supremacist rhetoric in a successful attempt to harness the frustrations of white farmers and laborers for political gain.

The specific tensions that existed between free African-American tenant farmers and white landowners often gave way to violence, resulting in lynchings and other hate crimes. Lynchings also increased during the summer, when white landowners had incentive to take ripe crops and harvests away from their tenants, by threat or force. These factors likely contributed to the altercation which resulted in Avery Mills' lynching.

== Principal figures ==
=== Avery Mills and Raney Mills ===
Avery Mills was an African-American tenant farmer born in December 1878. He worked on land owned by Mills Higgins Flack, a white farm owner in Rutherford County, North Carolina. He lived with his wife Raney Mills, born in 1882. The Mills had a daughter named Massey 1899, and Raney was pregnant with their second child in the summer of 1900. Both of the Mills were born free, and Avery possibly rented the land he worked on from Flack.

=== Mills Higgins Flack ===
Mills Higgins Flack was a farmer of Scotch-Irish descent whose ancestors had moved to the Tryon County region in the 18th century. During the Civil War, Flack served as a captain in the North Carolina Home Guard, 63rd Battalion. Prior to Emancipation, the Flacks had owned a number of slaves. They continued to be prosperous after the war, as Flack owned a productive farm in Cove Creek. He later moved to a new farm in Hamilton Quarters, near Bostic, and then purchased a farm near Burnt Chimney (now Forest City). Around this time, the Flack family's fortunes began to decrease as they fell on hard times.

== Events ==
=== Shooting of Mills Higgins Flack ===
According to Flack's 13-year-old son Otho, the dispute began when Raney Mills asked Mills Higgins Flack to stop picking peaches from the Mills' farm. The Flacks were offended at this request, as it infringed on the balance of power and unspoken "racial etiquette". By not deferring to Flack as a white man and landlord, Raney had grievously offended him.

Mills Higgins Flack visited the Mills' on the morning of August 28, 1900 to discuss the disagreement. He brought a shotgun with him, and was accompanied by Otho. The argument grew heated, and Otho alleged that Raney threw a rock at Flack. Flack drew his pistol and shot Avery Mills in the hip. Avery attempted to retreat to his house and Flack followed, hitting him over the head with his shotgun. Avery asked Raney to hand him his pistol. According to Otho, she brought him the pistol, although she denied having handed it to him. Flack then tried to take the pistol away from him. During the struggle, Avery Mills shot Mills Higgins Flack, fatally wounding him.

The Mills' were both arrested shortly after the shooting, and Flack died within the hour. His final words, spoken to a number of friends and others who had come to witness the aftermath, were that he wanted them to ensure Mills was hanged. Newspapers quickly reported garbled accounts of the shooting, claiming that Avery Mills had shot Flack in cold blood and that Flack had wounded Mills with his dying breaths.

=== Lynching of Avery Mills and trial of Raney Mills ===
The Mills' were brought to court in Forest City, where they were charged with murder by Judge Cicero Greene. The judge ordered that they be brought six miles northwest to the county jail in Rutherfordton. Marshall Sam Henrick and Constable William C. Hardin began to drive the Mills' to Rutherfordton by wagon but were intercepted halfway there by a mob of about 250 men. They took Avery Mills out of the wagon and dragged him to a nearby road. He was shot over 20 times, while Raney attempted to escape in the confusion. She was caught, but was allowed to live because she was pregnant at the time.

Both Avery Mills and Mills Higgins Flack were buried on August 29. Flack was buried in Cool Springs Cemetery, Forest City, while Mills' burial place is unknown. None of the men who lynched Mills were arrested. Raney Mills was subsequently taken to jail in Rutherfordton and faced trial in November. Her case was moved to Cleveland County due to concerns that she would not receive a fair trial. She was convicted of second degree murder in a trial by jury. However, the judge presiding over the case, William S. O'Brien Robinson, felt that the jury's verdict was unfair. He petitioned Governor Charles B. Aycock to pardon her, which Aycock did as he agreed with O'Brien Robinson. Mills was pardoned on May 6, 1901, having served a year of her sentence and given birth to her baby during that time.
