= Felix Eugene Alley =

American lawyer and politician

- Portrait of Felix E. Alley, circa 1930

North Carolina Superior Court Judge
- In office 1933–1948

Solicitor for the Twentieth NC Judicial District
- In office 1910–1914

Representative to the North Carolina General Assembly
- In office 1905–1905

Personal details
- Born: 5 July 1873 Sylva, Jackson County, North Carolina, United States
- Died: 5 January 1957 (aged 83) North Carolina, United States
- Parent: John Heywood Alley Jr.
- Occupation: Lawyer, politician, judge, author

Felix Eugene Alley (July 5, 1873 – January 5, 1957) was an American judge, author, and politician, who served as a North Carolina Superior Court Judge from 1933 to 1948. He also served as a representative to the North Carolina General Assembly in 1905.

== Life ==
Felix Alley was born in 1873 to John Heywood Alley Jr. and Sarah Norton. He was a personal lawyer to the Cherokee Chief, William Holland Thomas, and also served as a representative to the North Carolina General Assembly in 1905. He later went on to be a Solicitor for the local North Carolina District Court. His last office was that of North Carolina Superior Court Judge from 1933 to 1948. He retired in 1948 before dying 9 years later in 1957.

Alongside his legal career, Alley was an amateur folklorist and musician. When he was just sixteen years old, he composed 'The Ballad of Kidder Cole,' that became a notable piece of Appalachian folk music. Alley's early life involving traditional mountain music and his banjo which was homemade is detailed in his 1941 memoir, Random Thoughts and the Musings of a Mountaineer.

== Legacy ==
He presided over several cases in the North Carolina Superior Court including State v. McCollum, 6 S.E.2d 503, 210 N.C. 737 (N.C. 1940).
