= Alexander Mills, North Carolina =

Former town in North Carolina, United States of America

Coordinates: 35°18′38″N 81°51′31″W

Alexander Mills, North Carolina, was a town in Rutherford County, North Carolina, in the USA. It was incorporated in 1925 and named after a textile mill established by J.F. Alexander. In 1999, Alexander Mills merged with and became a part of Forest City, North Carolina.

== Sources ==
- The North Carolina Gazetteer, A Dictionary of Tar Heel Places, by William S. Powell
