= Conserving Carolina =

US non-profit organization

- Formation: April 22, 1994
- Founded: 1994
- Founders: Lela McBride, Anne Ulinski
- Type: Nonprofit conservation organization
- Headquarters: Hendersonville, North Carolina
- Location: Hendersonville, North Carolina
- Region served: Henderson, Transylvania, Buncombe, Rutherford, Polk and Jackson Counties, North Carolina
- Method: Conservation
- Executive Director: Kieran C. Roe
- Key people: Chuck McGrady, Past President John Humphrey, Past President Tom Fanslow, Land Protection Director
- Employees: 25 Staff and 5 AmeriCorps members
- Website: conservingcarolina.org

Conserving Carolina is a non-profit conservation organization working to preserve land and water resources in Western North Carolina. Conserving Carolina was created in July 2017, from a merger of two previously separate organizations, Carolina Mountain Land Conservancy and Pacolet Area Conservancy. The organization maintains an office in Hendersonville, North Carolina.

== History ==
What was to become the Carolina Mountain Land Conservancy, now Conserving Carolina, began with a 1991 natural areas inventory of Henderson County, North Carolina, which identified numerous places in the county with intact and important natural resources worthy of conservation. In 1994, the Natural Heritage Trust of Henderson County was formed to seek protection of these important sites. A year later, it was renamed the Carolina Mountain Land Conservancy and expanded its area of focus to include Transylvania and parts of Buncombe, Rutherford, Polk and Jackson Counties. The organization began working with local landowners to protect farm, forest, park, and natural lands with the support of local community members. It hired its first full-time staff person, Kieran C. Roe, as executive director in 1999. Conserving Carolina has grown into one of the premier land conservancies in the Southeast, protecting some 50,000 acres (200 km^{2}) of land by 2025. It was among the first class of land trusts in the U.S. to become accredited by the Land Trust Accreditation Commission in 2009 and has since been reaccredited every five years.

The Pacolet Area Conservancy was formed in 1989 to conserve land and water resources in Polk County, North Carolina and parts of the Pacolet River watershed across the state line in the Landrum area of South Carolina. Prior to the merger in 2017, Pacolet Area Conservancy helped protect more than 10,000 acres of forests, farms, greenspace, mountains, and waterways, including 1,500 acres at the Walnut Creek Preserve in northern Polk County.

After over a year of discussions focused on greater collaboration between the organizations, the two conservancies decide to join in order to more effectively advance their common mission to conserve natural resources in their burgeoning region within the Carolinas for generations to come. With an expanded geographic region, the merged organization combines expertise, talents, resources and a strengthened ability to protect land and water resources, and foster appreciation of the region's unique natural heritage.

== Approach ==
Conserving Carolina works with various sectors of society including businesses, individuals, communities, partner organizations, and government agencies to achieve its goals. Conserving Carolina uses a mix of financial incentives along with the goodwill of conservation-minded landowners to preserve land from development.

Conserving Carolina has pioneered the use of conservation easements in Henderson and Transylvania Counties. A conservation easement is a way for landowners to ensure that their land remains in its natural state while capitalizing on some of the land's potential development value. Conserving Carolina also works with the North Carolina Division of State Parks and other government partners to acquire land for sites such as Chimney Rock State Park.

== Significant Conservation ==
=== Chimney Rock State Park ===
Acquisition of the Worlds Edge Property in 2005 was a $16 million joint effort of Conserving Carolina and The Nature Conservancy to save 1,568 acres (6.35 km^{2}) of property spanning Henderson, Polk, and Rutherford counties. The Worlds Edge Property, formerly owned by The Robert Haywood Morrison Foundation, contains over 20,000 feet (6,100 m) of streams and waterfalls, in addition to numerous endangered salamander, bird, and bat species. In December 2009, Conserving Carolina acquired the 1,527-acre (6.18 km^{2}) Weed Patch Mountain tract north of Lake Lure, which adds to the corridor of conserved land including the State Park.

=== Green River Preserve ===
The Green River Preserve encompasses some 3,895 acres (15.76 km^{2}) of the upper Green River Watershed, the largest conservation project in terms of acreage by Conserving Carolina. The Green River area is listed under the North Carolina Natural Heritage identified natural area, significant for a diversity of habitat types including granite dome outcrops, steep cliffs, rich cove forests, Carolina hemlock bluffs, and pine-oak forests. The conservation of this area was made possible by donations from the Schenck and Ball families, with help from the Clean Water Management Trust Fund.

=== Florence Nature Preserve ===
The Florence Nature Preserve is a 600-acre (2.4 km^{2}) tract located in the upper Hickory Nut Gorge area near Gerton, North Carolina. Donated by Dr. Tom and Glenna Florence in two phases (1996 and 2001) the preserve is open to the general public for hiking.

=== Lewis Creek Nature Preserve ===
Lewis Creek Nature Preserve is located in Edneyville, North Carolina. The preserve is home to a 6.5 acres (0.026 km^{2}) mixed Appalachian Bog. This ecosystem is listed as critically endangered with only 750 acres (3.0 km^{2}) of this variety of bogs and fens still in existence, an 83 percent loss from the estimated 5,000 acres (20 km^{2}) that once existed.

Conserving Carolina purchased the property that forms Lewis Creek Nature Park in 2004 to be maintained for the use of homeowners in the adjacent neighborhood. The North Carolina Ecosystem Enhancement Program has been contracted to conduct stream restoration on the portion of Lewis Creek running through the nature park. The finish date of this project has been delayed from the original estimation of August 2008. Due to the fragile and unique nature of the park, it is not open to the general public, but Conserving Carolina does hold tree planting and exotic invasive species removal workdays there.

=== Headwaters State Forest ===
In June 2010, CMLC, in partnership with The Conservation Fund, announced that 8,000 acres (32 km^{2}) in the upper French Broad River watershed in Transylvania County, North Carolina, was under contract for purchase with Champion Cattle and Tree Farms, a company owned by the family of former western North Carolina Congressman Charles H. Taylor. The tract lies on the South Carolina state line across from the City of Greenville's 10,000-acre (40 km^{2}) Table Rock Watershed property. It includes an eight-mile (13 km) section of the Foothills Trail and is home to over 50 miles (80 km) of headwaters trout streams.

== Volunteerism ==
Like many non-profits, Conserving Carolina relies on the contribution of volunteers who constitute the board of directors, and participate in the day-to-day operations of the organization. In 2007, volunteers contributed over 3,600 hours, saving the organization an estimated $70,236.00 (U.S) worth of staff time. Volunteer positions include office administrators, wildlife monitors, committee members, and tech support consultants.

== See also ==
- Conservation in the United States
- Land trust
- Conservation easement
