= Aarhus Sejlklub =

Yacht club in Denmark

Coordinates: 56°10′00.9″N 10°13′27.0″E

- Burgee
- Founded: 1880
- Location: Aarhus, Denmark
- Website: Website

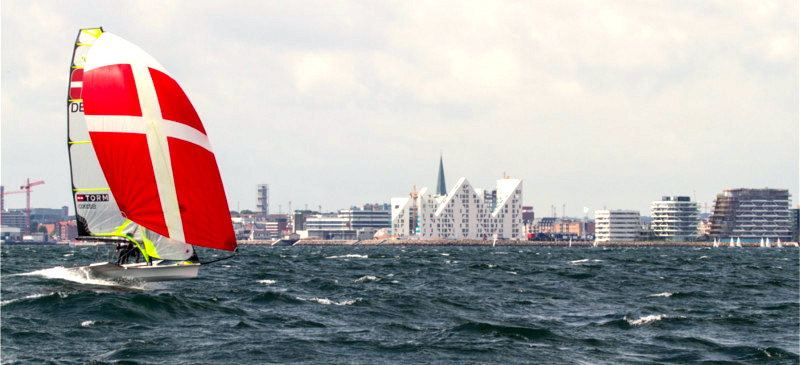
One of the club's yachts in the Bay of Aarhus

Aarhus Sejlklub (Aarhus Sailing Club) is one of the oldest yacht clubs in Denmark. It was established in 1879 in Aarhus, Central Denmark Region and is based out of the Aarhus Docklands. Aarhus Sejlklub is in the premiere division of the Danish League of Sail Sports and is a member of Sailing Aarhus which has hosted the ISAF Sailing World Championships in 2018.

Aarhus Sejlklub maintains a fleet of Optimists and 49ers sailing in the Bay of Aarhus and Kalø Vig. The club also runs a school with instructors teaching a range of different disciplines for both youth and adults, leisure or professional sports. Aarhus Sejlklub has been a member of Danish Sailing Association since 1922.

== History ==
Aarhus Sejlklub originates from a series of sailing competitions in the Bay of Aarhus and the Kattegat beginning in 1866. In 1878 a committee was established to work towards the founding of a yacht club and on 27 July 1880 the Aarhusbugtens Sejlklub was founded with manufacturer Alexius Leth as chairman and master painter Carstensen, restaurateur A. Bass, manufacturer Caroe and merchant Ludvig Houmann on the board. In 1902 the name was changed to Aarhus Sejlklub. The club contributed to the founding of the Jutland Sail Union in 1909 as an organization between Aarhus Sejlklub, Horsens Sejlklub, Sejlklubben Neptun and Vejle, Fredericia and Kolding Sailing Clubs.
