= Christopher Bechtler =

German-born American goldsmith and watchmaker

- Bechtler's mint marker near Bechtler's house in Rutherfordton
- Born: November 29, 1782; Pforzheim, Margraviate of Baden, Holy Roman Empire
- Died: 1843 (aged 60–61); Rutherfordton, North Carolina
- Occupations: Goldsmith and watchmaker

Christopher (alias Christian) Bechtler (November 29, 1782–1843) was a German-born American goldsmith and watchmaker. He produced defined gold dollars known as Bechtler Dollars, in the early 1830s and by 1840, before the US government itself started to produce gold dollars in 1849. The site of his mint is designated the Bechtler Mint Site Historic Park in North Carolina.

== Life ==
Bechtler was born in Pforzheim, Margraviate of Baden on November 29, 1782. In 1767 Charles Frederick, Grand Duke of Baden, allowed watch manufacturing in Pforzheim and started a technical school. The latter gave ground to further educational institutions and is now the Goldschmiedeschule mit Uhrmacherschule Pforzheim (Jewelers and Watchmakers School of Pforzheim); Bechtler was trained there. Around 1820, Bechtler spotted small gold traces in Stubensand, an early household abrasive. In 1823, he requested a mining concession and tried placer mining for gold in the Late Triassic Stubensandstein around neighboring Sternenfels where the Stubensand was produced. The amount of gold found was not satisfactory, but Bechtler asked for a Ducal Badensian Patent for his gold washing machine in 1819.

In 1829, Bechtler, his sons Augustus and Charles, and a nephew immigrated to the United States. In 1830 he opened a watchmaker store in Philadelphia, the site of the first United States Mint. Drawn by one of the first gold rushes in the United States, Bechtler moved to North Carolina in 1830 and established a private mint.

Bechtler died in Rutherfordton, North Carolina.

Bechtler and his successors' private mint in Rutherford County, North Carolina, was run from 1831 through the 1850s and produced more than a million gold coins in the period between 1831 and 1841. Bechtler's precision and the reliable gold content of his coins allowed him to prevail against other producers and to obtain a large fortune.

== Coinage ==
Bechtler's mint produced coins in three denominations: $1, $2.50, and $5, and the coins were struck in three Fineness: 20 carats, 21 carats, and 22 carats. At the time and within the limits of the existing technology, the coins were considered of honest weight.

== Bechtler's coins today ==
Because of the Coinage Act of June 28, 1834, which increased the value of gold by more than 6%, Bechtler's coins today are quite scarce and consequently, command high prices when offered for sale. The North Carolina National Bank of Charlotte has a collection that can be viewed today.
