= Chimney Rock State Park =

State park in North Carolina, United States

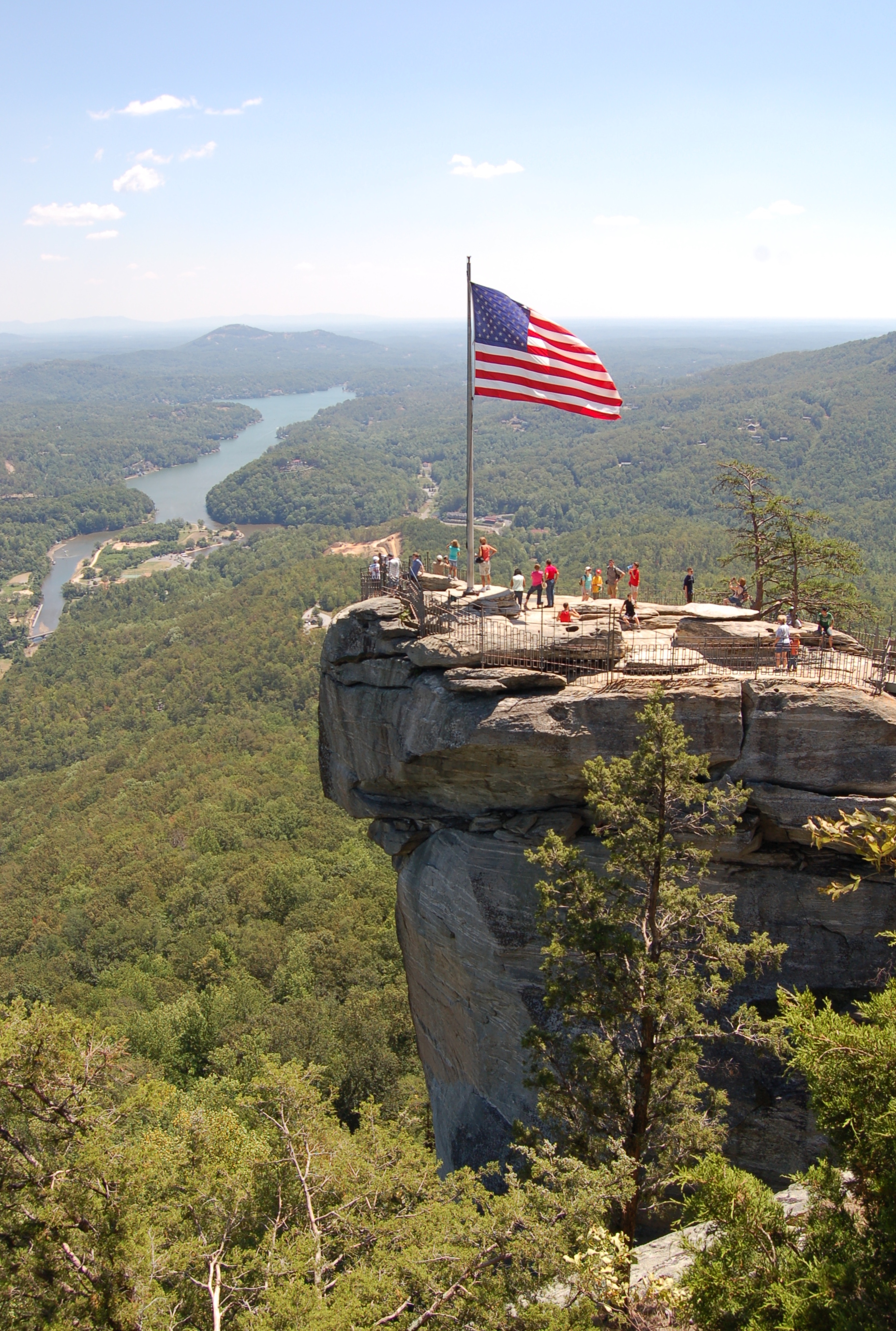
- Chimney Rock, a 315-foot (96 m) gneiss monolith

- Location within North Carolina Location within the United States
- Interactive map of Chimney Rock State Park
- Location: Rutherford County, North Carolina, United States
- Coordinates: 35°25′59″N 82°15′02″W
- Area: 8,014 acres (3,243 ha)
- Elevation: 2,280 ft (690 m)
- Established: May 4, 2005
- Administrator: North Carolina Division of Parks and Recreation
- Website: Official website

Chimney Rock State Park is a North Carolina state park in Chimney Rock, Rutherford County, North Carolina in the United States. The 8,014-acre (32.43 km^{2}) park is located 25 miles (40 km) southeast of Asheville, North Carolina, and is owned and managed by the state of North Carolina.

The park features hiking trails for all skill levels, views of the Devil's Head balancing rock, and a 404-foot (123 m) waterfall, Hickory Nut Falls. Its most notable feature is a 315-foot (96 m) gneiss monolith named Chimney Rock, which is accessible by elevator and provides views of the park and surrounding countryside.

== Early park development ==
In May 2005, the North Carolina General Assembly authorized the creation of the "Hickory Nut Gorge State Park." In August 2005 the Carolina Mountain Land Conservancy (renamed Conserving Carolina in 2017) and The Nature Conservancy purchased a 1,568-acre (6.35 km^{2}) tract of land south of Lake Lure known as "World's Edge" for $16 million with the intention of transferring the land as the first to be added to the new state park. World's Edge contains a mile-long set of steep slopes on the eastern edge of the Blue Ridge Escarpment (an escarpment of the Blue Ridge Mountains), with more than 20,000 feet (6,100 m) of streams and waterfalls. From an overlook point, the land falls away to provide views of the Piedmont. The area provides habitat for rare flowers, diverse forest communities, endangered bats and salamanders, unique cave-dwelling invertebrates, and birds such as peregrine falcons and migratory neotropical species. Transfer of the World's Edge tract to state ownership was completed in 2006.

== State acquisition of Chimney Rock Park ==
In 1902, Dr. Lucius B. Morse purchased 64 acres (26 hectares) at Chimney Rock Mountain from Jerome Freeman, a North Carolina state legislator and land speculator, including the Chimney and cliffs. Morse and his family owned and operated "Chimney Rock Park" as a privately managed park from 1902 to 2007. Many small tracts purchased over the years expanded the park to 996 acres (403 hectares). In 2006 the land was put up for sale. Many feared the park might fall into the hands of private developers, but the state and the Morse family completed a purchase agreement in early 2007.

In July 2007, the General Assembly renamed Hickory Nut Gorge State Park to Chimney Rock State Park.

== Geology ==
The metamorphic rock underlying Chimney Rock State Park and Hickory Nut Gorge has been mapped and studied in detailed by Lemmon and Dunn, Davis, Davis and Yanagihara, and Epps. They found that the region of Chimney Rock State Park and Hickory Nut Gorge is generally underlain by Ordovician, Henderson Gneiss. North of the Broad River, outliers of the older Poor Mountain Formation overlie the Henderson Gneiss and comprise the summit of and crests of two eastern ridges of Rumbling Bald Mountain. Similarly, south of the Broad River, The upper portions of Chimney Rock Mountain and Sugar Loaf Mountain also consist of an outlier of Poor Mountain Formation and Sugarloaf Gneiss overlying the Henderson Gneiss. In both areas, the contact between the Henderson Gneiss and the overlying Poor Mountain Formation is a thrust fault known as the Sugarloaf thrust fault. Ancient movement along the Sugarloaf thrust fault has transported the strata of the Poor Mountain Formation westward and over the top of the Henderson Gneiss. The surface of the Sugarloaf thrust fault slopes steeply to the east. As a result, the plane of the Sugarloaf thrust fault disappears along with the Henderson Gneiss beneath an overlying migmatitic biotite gneiss and Poor Mountain Formation along a north-south line following to the axis of the north and south arms of Lake Lure. At Bat Cave, North Carolina, the Henderson Gneiss abruptly terminates against another eastward sloping thrust fault that is known as the Tumblebug thrust fault. Along the Tumblebug thrust fault the Henderson Gneiss lies on and has been transported westward and over poorly-foliated, light-gray, medium-grained, Ordovician-Silurian, biotite-granite-gneiss.

=== Henderson Gneiss ===
The Henderson Gneiss is a medium- to coarse-grained, typically well-foliated, biotite-microcline augen gneiss. It consists mostly of oligoclase, quartz, orthoclase, and biotite. Accessory minerals are muscovite, garnet, allanite, zircon, sphene, and opaque minerals A distinctive trait of Henderson Gneiss is the presence of orthoclase augen up to 3 cm (1.2 in) long. It also exhibits a pronounced NE-SW-trending mineral lineation defined by quartz ribbons, elongate orthoclase porphyroclasts, and flakes of biotite and occasional muscovite. The composition of the Henderson Gneiss indicates that before metamorphism was originally (509 Ma) granite to quartz monzonite. In local and regional studies of the economic geology of areas containing the Hickory Nut Gorge and Chimney Rock State Park area, economic minerals and ores of any significant were found to be lacking in the Henderson Gneiss.

The massive and largely unfractured nature of the Henderson Gneiss is directly reflected in the scenery of Hickory Nut Gorge and Chimney Rock State Park. The exfoliation surfaces, locally called balds, rim the valleys of Hickory Nut Gorge and Chimney Rock State Park. In addition, other joints produce large blocks that spall from the exfoliation surfaces and landslides. Both processes have produced talus and fissure caves such as Bat and Gneiss caves. Erosion along joints in the Henderson Gneiss produced Chimney Rock.

=== Poor Mountain Formation ===
As previously discussed, the Poor Mountain Formation outcrops structurally above the Henderson Gneiss in the Chimney Rock State Park area. Their contact is the Sugarloaf thrust fault. North of Broad River, the Poor Mountain Formation consists of garnet-mica schist and quartzite. South of the Broad River, this formation consists of amphibolite-hornblende gneiss that overlies garnet-mica schist and quartzite. South of the Broad River, the amphibolite-hornblende gneiss the Poor Mountain Formation is overlain by the Sugarloaf Gneiss. The amphibolite-hornblende gneiss is medium-grained, dark-gray to black, and typically exhibits well-defined quartzose and feldspathic laminae. The laminae are often highly folded. Typically, it consists of 22-70 percent dark-green pleochroic hornblende, 7-61 percent plagioclase, 0-22 percent quartz, occasional diopside, and small flakes of pleochroic biotite. Outcropping between the amphibolite-hornblende gneiss and the Sugarloaf thrust fault, the garnet-mica schist and quartzite is purplish-red, to brown, to light-gray in color depending on its variable mineralogy and degree of weathering. The schist is highly foliated with strongly aligned grains. It consists of 21-40 percent biotite, 2-38 percent muscovite and 0-13 percent sillimanite. Accessory minerals found in the schist include garnet, zircon, apatite, magnetite, ilmenite, and graphite. Often, the schist contains ribbons or layers of recrystallized quartz and minor amounts of orthoclase. Local and regional studies of the economic geology of areas containing the Hickory Nut Gorge and Chimney Rock State Park area found economic mineral depoists of any significance to be lacking in the Poor Mountain Formation. Uneconomic deposits of marble, muscovite mica, and mica schist were observed along with pegmatites composed of quartz, plagioclase, microcline, and muscovite with minor amounts of biotite and garnet and lacking spodumene and valuable minerals.

=== Sugarloaf Gneiss ===
Forming the summit of Sugarloaf Mountain and overlying the Poor Mountain Formation is the Sugarloaf Gneiss. It is typically light-gray to white and massive to well-foliated. It also exhibits a pronounced NE-SW mineral lineation that is defined by oriented micas, quartz ribbons, and elongate feldspars. The locally folded contact with the underlying amphibolite-hornblende gneiss is concordant and parallel to the southeast-dipping foliation of the underlying gneiss. It consists of mainly microcline, plagioclase, biotite and muscovite. Its accessory minerals include zircon, sphene, apatite, allanite, chlorite, epidote, and garnet. Its varies from granitic to granodioritic in composition. A few pegmatites have been found near summit of Sugarloaf Mountain, and near Otranola Gap. They are generally coarse-grained and composed of quartz, plagioclase, microcline, and muscovite with minor amounts of biotite and garnet and lacking in spodumene and other valuable minerals. Economic deposits of minerals and ores have not been observed in the Sugarloaf Gneiss.

== Hurricane Helene damage ==
The park suffered damage—and the entire loss of the access bridge—due to Hurricane Helene in 2024, resulting in park closure until its reopening on June 27, 2025.

== Gallery ==
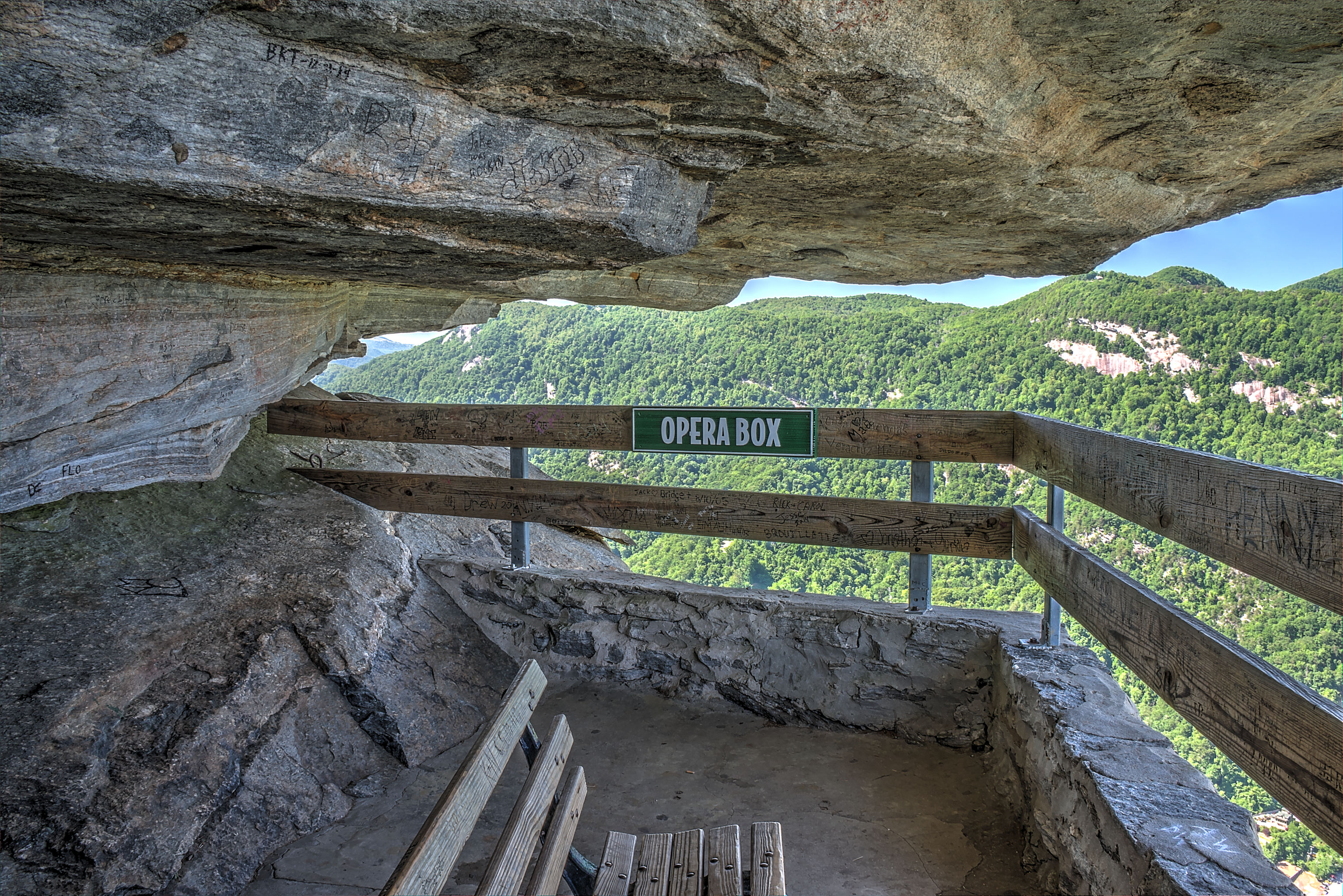
Opera Box

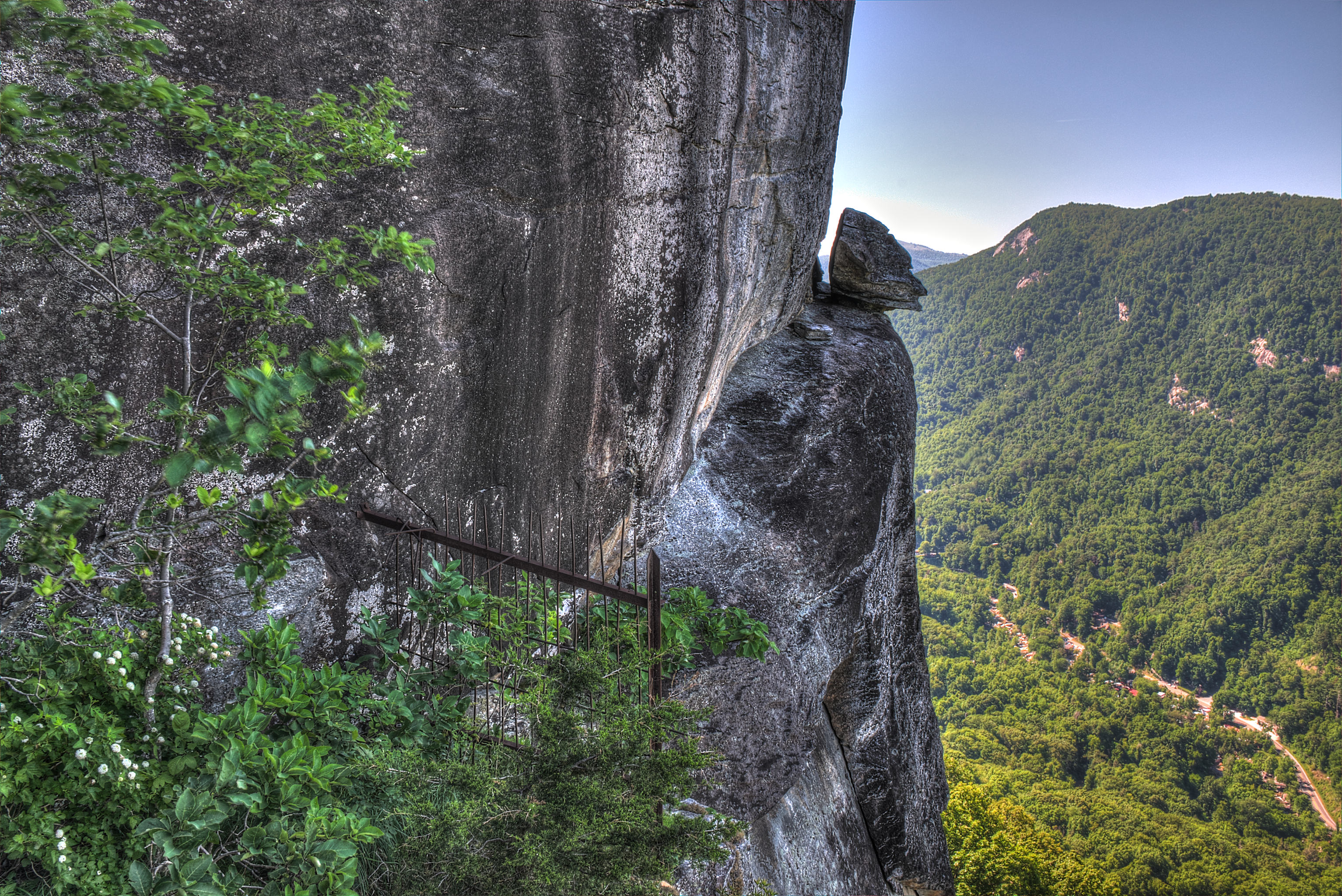
Devil's Head

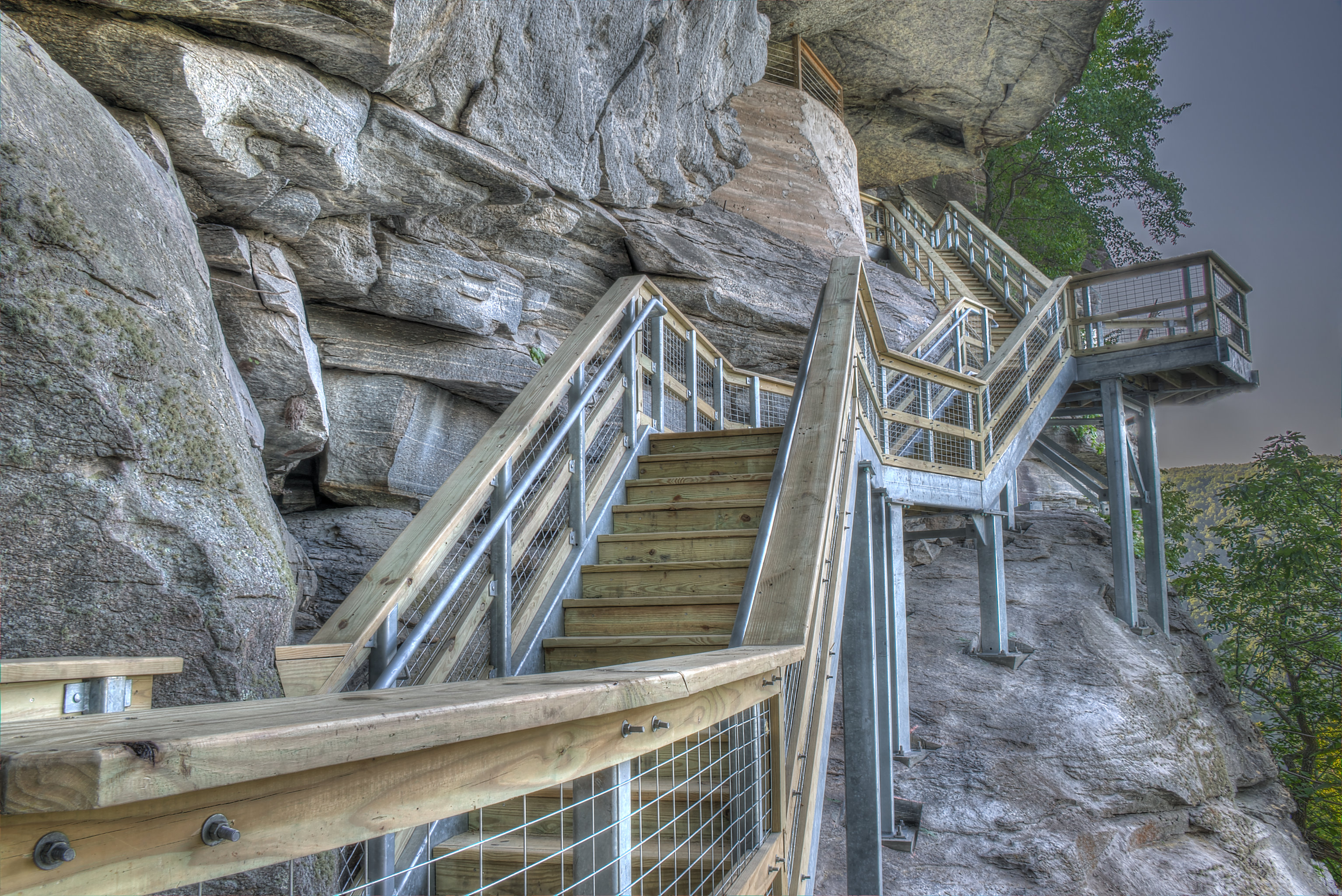
Detail of stairs

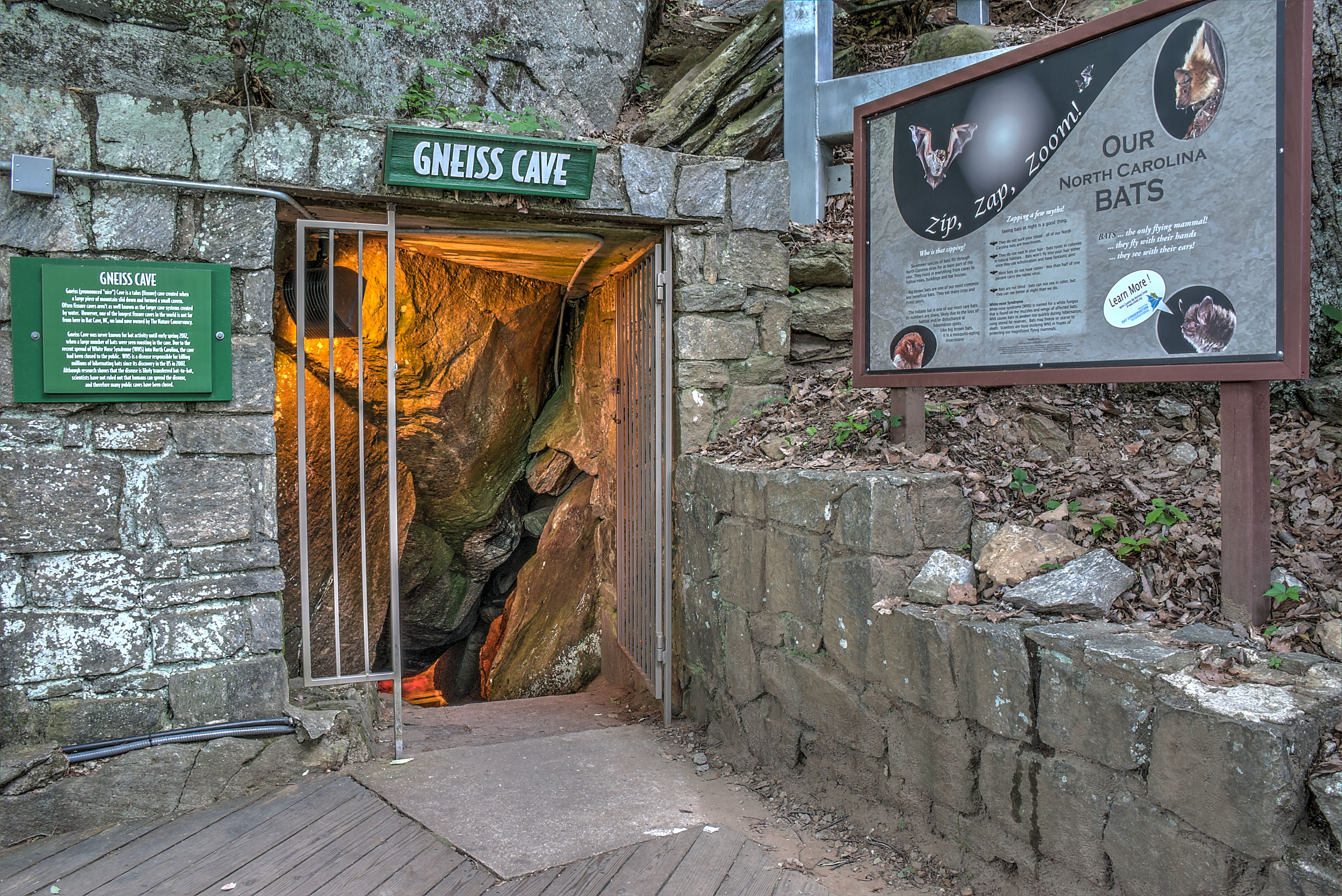
Gneiss Cave

== See also ==
- Hickory Nut Gorge State Trail
