= George Cathey =

American Revolution captain

Captain George Cathey
- Born: January 1755; Mecklenburg County, North Carolina
- Died: December 14, 1840 (aged 85); Pettis County, Missouri
- Burial place: Crown Hill Cemetery; 38°42′55″N 93°12′50″W
- Military career
- Allegiance: United States
- Service years: 1780–1783
- Rank: Captain

Captain George Cathey (1755-1840) was an American Revolutionary War captain who served with one of the twenty companies of the Burke County Regiment. He served as a captain from 1780 to 1783.

== Personal life ==
George Cathey was born in January 1755 in Mecklenburg County, North Carolina per his Revolutionary War Pension statement. Even then it was a much larger county than it is today, geographically speaking. He was residing in Burke County when he entered service in the Burke County, North Carolina Militia George's service included three months as a Private, six months as Lieutenant and fifteen months as Captain. He served under Captain Jonathan Camp who commanded a light horse company of 95 men and fought Cherokee Indians at Big Bears Town and Cowee in 1777. He also spent time at Cathey's Fort built on land originally owned by his father, George Cathey Sr., near today's Marion, NC and the fort near Turkey Grove (today's McDowell County, NC) known originally as Cathey's Fort and later as Wofford's Fort. and fought in several skirmishes and in the Battle of Kings Mountain (1780) and Battle of Cowpens (1781) against the British.

After the Revolutionary War, he lived in Burke and Buncombe counties before moving to Cooper County in Missouri. He married Margaret Chambers c. 1776. George served as Administrator for the will of Margaret's father, James, in 1805. Cathey died on December 14, 1840, in Pettis County, Missouri. He is buried in Smithton, Missouri.

== Legacy ==
There are multiple landmarks in North Carolina named after Cathey family including Cathey's Creek, Cathey's Plantation and the George Cathey Memorial Bridge.
