= Rutherford County, North Carolina =

County in North Carolina, United States

- County
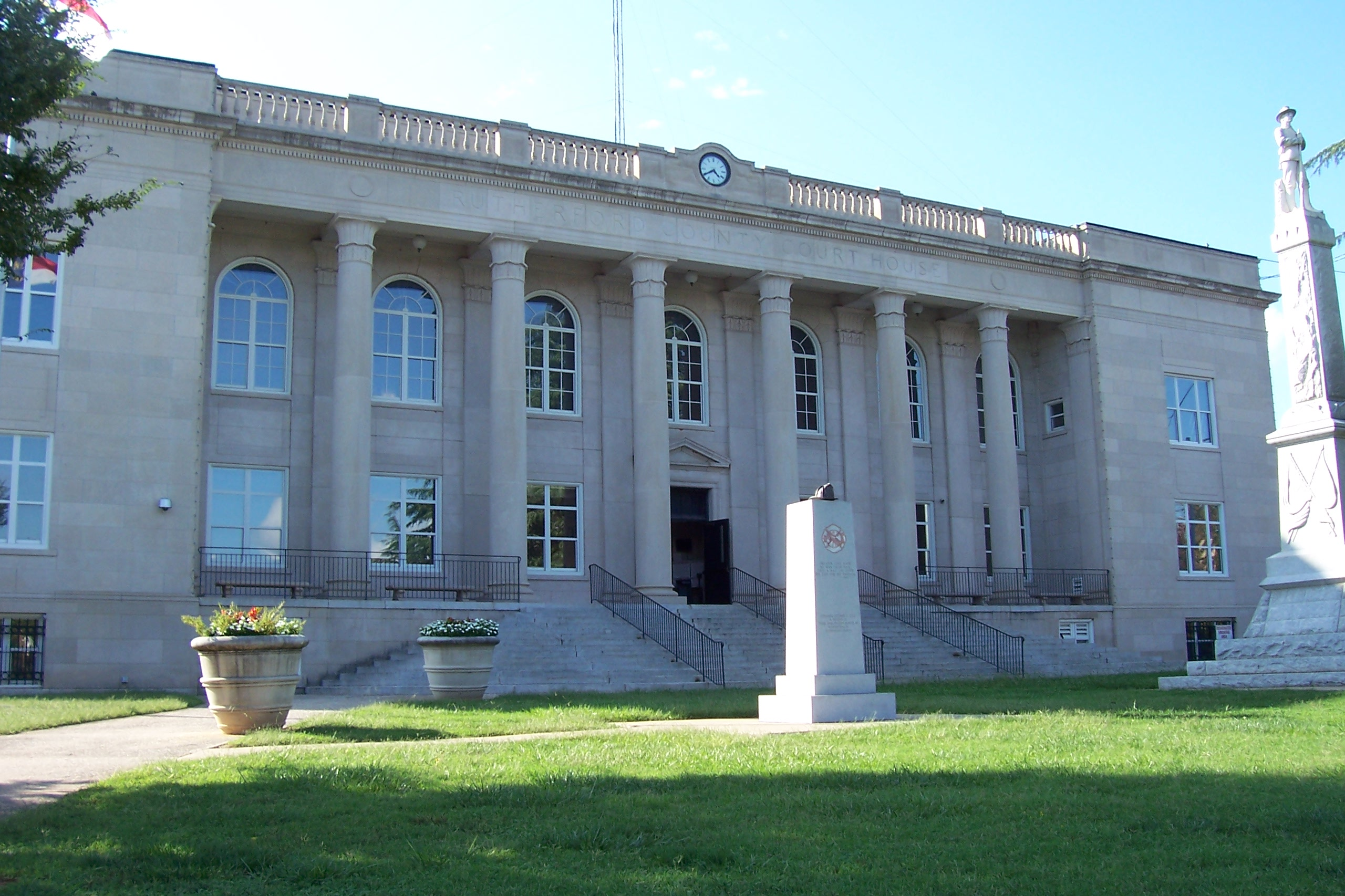
- Rutherford County Courthouse

- Seal Logo
- Motto: "Vibrant Communities – New Possibilities"
- Location within the U.S. state of North Carolina
- Coordinates: 35.40°N 81.92°W
- Country: United States
- State: North Carolina
- Founded: April 14, 1779
- Named for: Griffith Rutherford
- Seat: Rutherfordton
- Largest community: Forest City

Government
  - Interim County Manager: Bryan King

Area
  - Total: 567.25 sq mi (1,469.2 km^{2})
  - Land: 565.44 sq mi (1,464.5 km^{2})
  - Water: 1.81 sq mi (4.7 km^{2}) 0.32%

Population (2020)
  - Total: 64,444
  - Estimate (2025): 65,745 ▲
  - Density: 113.97/sq mi (44.00/km^{2})
- Time zone: UTC−5 (Eastern)
  - Summer (DST): UTC−4 (EDT)
- Congressional district: 14th
- Website: rutherfordcountync.gov

Rutherford County is a county in the southwestern area of the U.S. state of North Carolina. As of the 2020 census, the population was 64,444. Its county seat is Rutherfordton. Rutherford County comprises the Forest City, NC Micropolitan Statistical Area.

== History ==
In the region's earliest history, it was inhabited by the Cherokee. It was a part of Mecklenburg County before being incorporated into Tryon County in 1768. Tryon County was divided into Rutherford County and Lincoln County in 1779. The first county seat was Gilbert Town. Rutherford Town (now Rutherfordton) was founded in 1787 to be the new county seat. The county and town are named for Griffith Rutherford, leader of an expedition against the Cherokee in 1776 and a general in the American Revolutionary War.

In 1791 parts of Rutherford County and Burke County were combined to form Buncombe County. In 1841 parts of Rutherford and Lincoln counties were combined to form Cleveland County. In 1842, additional parts of Rutherford and Burke counties were combined to form McDowell County. Finally, in 1855, parts of Rutherford and Henderson counties were combined to form Polk County.

In 1790, the county had 7,775 residents, including 164 families and 611 enslaved people. Many areas of the county were agriculturally productive or lay on important crossroads. The number of unincorporated communities in the county steadily increased, and the population reached had nearly doubled by 1810. The most important crops in the county during the 1800s were corn, wheat, oats, rye, cotton, wool and tobacco.

The county existed at the crossroads of stagecoach routes that connected places like Asheville, Salisbury and Charlotte. The Hickory Nut Turnpike was completed in 1847 to help make the route even safer and more appealing to travelers.

Rutherford County was the most important gold-producing region in America from 1790 until the California gold rush of the 1840s. The town of Rutherfordton was at the center of this. German goldsmith Christopher Bechtler and his sons set up a mint just north of Rutherfordton, where they produced millions of dollars' worth of US coins. The Bechtlers produced the first gold dollars in the United States.

The county has a strong militia tradition, stretching back to the 18th century when it had the most well organized militia in North Carolina. Its militiamen served in the Battle of Kings Mountain and Battle of Cowpens. During the Civil War, Rutherfordton and Burnt Chimney (now Forest City) competed to raise militias to serve in the Confederate States Army.

After the Civil War ended, many farmers in the region were forced to tenant farming, as they owned no land of their own. This meant that many Rutherford County residents were trapped in debt by predatory crop liens and other economic imbalances. The Rutherford Farmer's Alliance was established by D.N. Caviness in June 1888 to fight for farmer's rights, and had 300 members by 1891. The Alliance's first president was Colonel John L. McDowell. The underlying economic and racial tensions led to events like the Forest City lynching.

During this period of upheaval, when family and political feuds had been recently inflamed by the Civil War, Rutherford County experienced a rash of violence wreaked by the KKK, but local investigations in Rutherford County led to the prosecution of over 300 Klan members and by 1872, the KKK had begun to "disappear".

The construction of railroads and cotton mills in Rutherford County during the 1880s and 1890s invigorated the county's communities, none more so than Forest City. The Rutherford Railway Construction Company built a line from Rutherfordton to South Carolina, and Southern Railway and Seaboard Air Line Railroad also ran through the county.

A disproportionate number of Rutherford County natives served during WWII, with about 12% participating in the war effort in some capacity. 149 Rutherford County natives died in the war, proportionately 3.5 times as many losses as other counties. The first soldier from Rutherford County to die in the war was SFC Mark Alexander Rhodes, who died aboard the USS Arizona during the surprise attack on Pearl Harbor.

In May 1989, Rutherford County was hit by an EF4 tornado from a storm that came out of South Carolina. This tornado was part of the May 1989 tornado outbreak, that hit the states of Georgia, South Carolina, North Carolina, and Virginia.

== Geography ==
Interactive map of Rutherford County

Rutherford County Elevation

According to the U.S. Census Bureau, the county has a total area of 567.25 square miles (1,469.2 km^{2}), of which 565.44 square miles (1,464.5 km^{2}) is land and 1.81 square miles (4.7 km^{2}) (0.32%) is water.

In addition to gold and platinum, minerals like rock crystal, garnet, tourmaline, slate, wolframite, and the rare-earth element samarskite have been mined in Rutherford County. Diamonds have also been found there, including one mined at the JD Twitty Gold Placer Mine in 1845.

=== State and local protected areas ===
- Bechtler Mint Site Historic Park
- Bradley Nature Preserve at Alexander's Ford (part)
- Chimney Rock State Park (part)
- Purple Martin Greenway Trail
- South Mountains Game Lands (part)
- South Mountains State Park (part)

=== Major water bodies ===
- Broad River
- Catheys Creek
- Cedar Creek
- Duncans Creek
- Floyds Creek
- Green River
- Hills Creek
- Hollands Creek
- Lake Lure
- McKinney Creek
- Mountain Creek
- North Fork First Broad Creek
- Roberson Creek
- Second Broad River

=== Adjacent counties ===
- McDowell County – north
- Burke County – northeast
- Cleveland County – east
- Cherokee County, South Carolina – south
- Spartanburg County, South Carolina – south
- Polk County – southwest
- Henderson County – west
- Buncombe County – northwest

=== Major highways ===
- US 64
- US 74
- US 74A
- US 74 Bus.
- US 221
- US 221A
- NC 9
- NC 108
- NC 120
- NC 226

=== Major infrastructure ===
- Rutherford County Airport, Rutherfordton
- Summey Airpark, Caroleen

== Demographics ==
Historical population
Census	Pop.	Note	%±
1790	7,808		—
1800	10,753		37.7%
1810	13,202		22.8%
1820	15,351		16.3%
1830	17,557		14.4%
1840	19,202		9.4%
1850	13,550		−29.4%
1860	11,573		−14.6%
1870	13,121		13.4%
1880	15,198		15.8%
1890	18,770		23.5%
1900	25,101		33.7%
1910	28,385		13.1%
1920	31,426		10.7%
1930	40,452		28.7%
1940	45,577		12.7%
1950	46,356		1.7%
1960	45,091		−2.7%
1970	47,337		5.0%
1980	53,787		13.6%
1990	56,918		5.8%
2000	62,899		10.5%
2010	67,810		7.8%
2020	64,444		−5.0%
2025 (est.)	65,745	▲	2.0%
U.S. Decennial Census; 1790–1960 1900–1990; 1990–2000 2010 2020

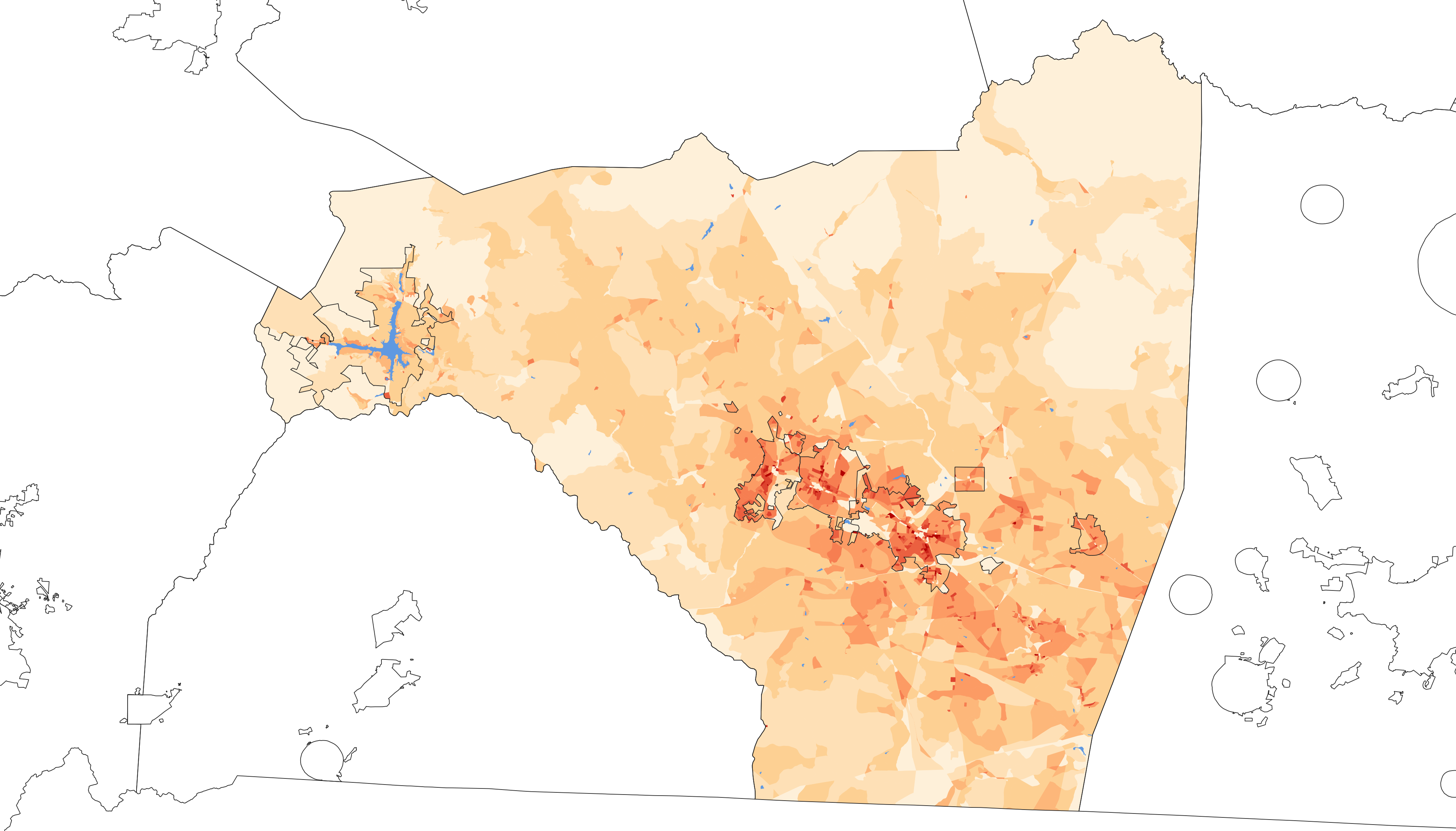
2020 population density of Rutherford County NC by census block

=== Racial and ethnic composition ===
Rutherford County, North Carolina – Racial and ethnic composition Note: the US Census treats Hispanic/Latino as an ethnic category. This table excludes Latinos from the racial categories and assigns them to a separate category. Hispanics/Latinos may be of any race.
Race / Ethnicity (NH = Non-Hispanic)	Pop 1980	Pop 1990	Pop 2000	Pop 2010	Pop 2020	% 1980	% 1990	% 2000	% 2010	% 2020
White alone (NH)	46,826	49,896	53,957	57,054	52,026	87.06%	87.66%	85.78%	84.14%	80.73%
Black or African American alone (NH)	6,461	6,488	7,028	6,804	5,836	12.01%	11.40%	11.17%	10.03%	9.06%
Native American or Alaska Native alone (NH)	38	95	102	156	152	0.07%	0.17%	0.16%	0.23%	0.24%
Asian alone (NH)	61	91	191	289	343	0.11%	0.16%	0.30%	0.43%	0.53%
Native Hawaiian or Pacific Islander alone (NH)	x	x	15	5	23	x	x	0.02%	0.01%	0.04%
Other race alone (NH)	6	6	54	66	210	0.01%	0.01%	0.09%	0.10%	0.33%
Mixed race or Multiracial (NH)	x	x	416	1,039	2,568	x	x	0.66%	1.53%	3.98%
Hispanic or Latino (any race)	395	342	1,136	2,397	3,286	0.73%	0.60%	1.81%	3.53%	5.10%
Total	53,787	56,918	62,899	67,810	64,444	100.00%	100.00%	100.00%	100.00%	100.00%

=== 2020 census ===
As of the 2020 census, the county had a population of 64,444, 26,652 households, and 18,874 families. The median age was 45.6 years; 20.2% of residents were under the age of 18 and 22.0% were 65 years of age or older. For every 100 females there were 94.9 males, and for every 100 females age 18 and over there were 92.6 males age 18 and over.

The racial makeup of the county was 81.9% White, 9.2% Black or African American, 0.3% American Indian and Alaska Native, 0.5% Asian, <0.1% Native Hawaiian and Pacific Islander, 2.3% from some other race, and 5.6% from two or more races. Hispanic or Latino residents of any race comprised 5.1% of the population.

32.2% of residents lived in urban areas, while 67.8% lived in rural areas.

Of the 26,652 households, 26.6% had children under the age of 18 living in them, 47.2% were married-couple households, 18.1% were households with a male householder and no spouse or partner present, and 28.1% were households with a female householder and no spouse or partner present. About 28.8% of all households were made up of individuals and 14.1% had someone living alone who was 65 years of age or older.

There were 32,444 housing units, of which 17.9% were vacant. Among occupied housing units, 71.3% were owner-occupied and 28.7% were renter-occupied. The homeowner vacancy rate was 1.7% and the rental vacancy rate was 7.8%.

=== 2000 census ===
At the 2000 census, the county had 62,899 people, 25,191 households, and 17,935 families. The population density was 112 people per square mile (43 people/km^{2}). There were 29,535 housing units at an average density of 52 units per square mile (20 units/km^{2}). The county's racial makeup was 86.79% White, 11.23% Black or African American, 0.20% Native American, 0.22% Asian, 0.03% Pacific Islander, 0.67% from other races, and 0.74% from two or more races. 1.81% of the population were Hispanic or Latino of any race.

There were 25,191 households, out of which 30.00% had children under the age of 18 living with them, 55.40% were married couples living together, 11.70% had a female householder with no husband present, and 28.80% were non-families. 25.50% of all households were made up of individuals, and 11.10% had someone living alone who was 65 years of age or older. The average household size was 2.44 and the average family size was 2.90.

In the county, the population was spread out, with 23.80% under the age of 18, 8.00% from 18 to 24, 27.90% from 25 to 44, 24.30% from 45 to 64, and 16.00% who were 65 years of age or older. The median age was 38 years. For every 100 females there were 93.00 males. For every 100 females age 18 and over, there were 89.60 males.

The county's median household income was $31,122, and the median family income was $37,787. Males had a median income of $28,890 versus $21,489 for females. The county's per capita income was $16,270. About 10.40% of families and 13.90% of the population were below the poverty line, including 18.30% of those under age 18 and 13.80% of those age 65 or over.

=== Ancestry/ethnicity ===
As of 1983, the largest ancestry/ethnicity groups in Rutherford County were:

Ancestry/ethnicity	Percent (1983)
English (England)	44%
African American (United States)	11%
Irish (Republic of Ireland)	9%
German (Germany)	5%
Scotch-Irish (Ulster)	4%
Scottish (Scotland)	3%
Dutch (Netherlands)	2%
Italian (Italy)	1%
French or French Canadian (except Basque) (France)	1%
Mexican (Mexico)	1%
Polish (Poland)	1%

== Government and politics ==
United States presidential election results for Rutherford County, North Carolina
Year	Republican		Democratic		Third party(ies)	
Year	No.	%	No.	%	No.	%
1912	82	2.14%	2,180	56.93%	1,567	40.92%
1916	1,871	43.35%	2,445	56.65%	0	0.00%
1920	4,015	44.04%	5,101	55.96%	0	0.00%
1924	3,897	43.17%	5,101	56.51%	29	0.32%
1928	5,762	58.16%	4,146	41.84%	0	0.00%
1932	4,448	34.65%	8,336	64.93%	54	0.42%
1936	4,830	32.77%	9,911	67.23%	0	0.00%
1940	4,204	32.16%	8,869	67.84%	0	0.00%
1944	4,698	38.90%	7,379	61.10%	0	0.00%
1948	4,342	36.95%	5,992	51.00%	1,416	12.05%
1952	8,387	51.96%	7,755	48.04%	0	0.00%
1956	8,200	53.22%	7,208	46.78%	0	0.00%
1960	8,993	51.25%	8,554	48.75%	0	0.00%
1964	7,115	42.72%	9,541	57.28%	0	0.00%
1968	7,785	46.11%	4,622	27.38%	4,476	26.51%
1972	9,506	68.80%	4,140	29.97%	170	1.23%
1976	6,718	39.24%	10,361	60.52%	42	0.25%
1980	8,363	49.29%	8,315	49.01%	288	1.70%
1984	11,369	62.23%	6,862	37.56%	37	0.20%
1988	10,337	59.73%	6,926	40.02%	43	0.25%
1992	9,748	47.95%	7,855	38.64%	2,726	13.41%
1996	9,792	52.73%	7,162	38.57%	1,617	8.71%
2000	13,755	63.34%	7,697	35.44%	264	1.22%
2004	16,343	66.28%	8,184	33.19%	131	0.53%
2008	18,769	65.35%	9,641	33.57%	310	1.08%
2012	18,954	66.04%	9,374	32.66%	374	1.30%
2016	21,871	72.16%	7,512	24.79%	924	3.05%
2020	24,891	72.30%	9,135	26.53%	403	1.17%
2024	25,456	73.42%	8,914	25.71%	300	0.87%

Rutherford is currently a powerfully Republican county. No Democratic presidential candidate has carried Rutherford County since Jimmy Carter did so in 1976. Before 1928 when Herbert Hoover won it, however, the county was a clear-cut part of the Democratic "Solid South".

No Democrat has been elected to county-wide office by a partisan election in Rutherford County since Eddie Holland and John Mark Bennett were elected to the Board of Commissioners and Board of Education, respectively, in 2016.

Rutherford County is governed by an elected board of commissioners. The County Board of Commissioners includes: Chairman Bryan King, Vice Chairman Alan Toney, Commissioner Michael Benfield, Commissioner Donnie Haulk, and Commissioner Hunter Haynes. The Board of Commissioners appoints a county manager to serve as the chief administrator. The current county manager is Chairman Bryan King who has been serving in an interim capacity since February 3, 2026.

Rutherford County is a member of the Foothills Regional Commission regional council of governments.

The county is policed by the Rutherford County Sheriff's Office. The current sheriff is Aaron Ellenburg who has been serving since December 5, 2022.

In the North Carolina General Assembly, Rutherford County is represented by Senator Tim Moffitt of District 48, Representative Jake Johnson of District 113, and Representative Paul Scott of District 111.

== Education ==
Rutherford County is served by Rutherford County Schools which operates 19 schools in the county, until 2025, when the school board voted to close Mt. Vernon-Ruth Elementary School, and the Rutherford Opportunity Center, reducing the number to 17.

Rutherford County Schools is governed by an elected board of education. The County Board of Education includes: Chairman Phillip Morrow, Vice Chairwoman Angel King, Thomas Crawford, David Linder, April Mayse, Brandi Nanney, and Tracy Short. The Board of Education appoints a superintendent to serve as the chief administrator. The current superintendent is Dr. David Sutton who has been serving since July 22, 2019.

Two public charter schools, Thomas Jefferson Classical Academy and Lake Lure Classical Academy, as well as two private schools, Trinity Christian Academy and The Masters Academy, operate in the county as well.

== Economy ==
Rutherford County has a large timber industry, as well as textile and construction materials manufacturing. The agricultural industry in Rutherfordton produces soybeans, wheat, corn, cotton, and livestock.

In 2010, Rutherford County was selected as the location for a new $450 million data center for Facebook.

In 2011, Horsehead Corporation announced the construction of its new, state-of-the-art zinc and diversified metals production facility in Rutherford County, NC, near the municipality of Forest City.

== Culture ==
Rutherford County has a tourism industry which includes areas like Lake Lure and Chimney Rock.

Several films have been shot in Rutherford County, including Firestarter (1984), The Last of the Mohicans (1992), and Dirty Dancing (1987).

== Communities ==
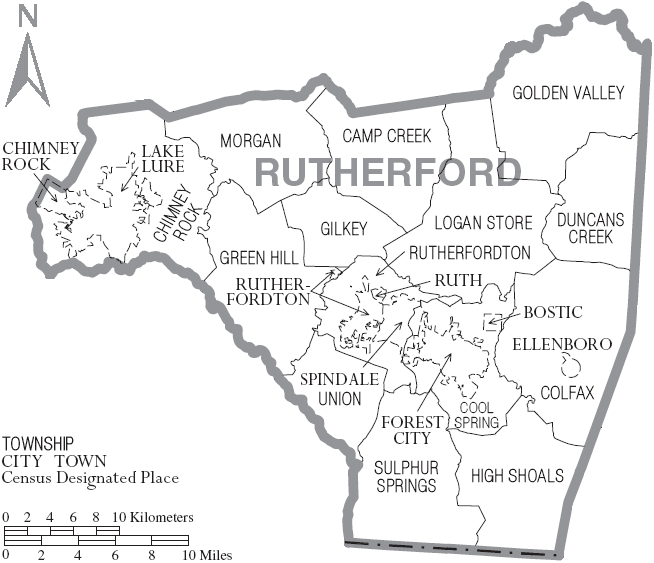
Map of Rutherford County with municipal and township labels

=== Towns ===
- Bostic
- Ellenboro
- Forest City (largest community)
- Lake Lure
- Ruth
- Rutherfordton (county seat)
- Spindale

=== Village ===
- Chimney Rock

=== Census-designated places ===
- Caroleen
- Cliffside
- Henrietta

=== Unincorporated communities ===
- Bills Creek
- Brice
- Corinth
- Danieltown
- Deerfield
- Duncans Creek
- Frog Level
- Gilkey
- Grahamtown
- Harris
- Hopewell
- Mount Vernon
- Union Mills
- Sandy Mush
- Shingle Hollow
- Hollis

=== Former community ===
- Alexander Mills
- Avondale

=== Townships ===
- Camp Creek
- Chimney Rock
- Colfax
- Cool Spring
- Duncans Creek
- Gilkey
- Golden Valley
- Green Hill
- High Shoals
- Logan Store
- Morgan
- Rutherfordton
- Sulphur Springs
- Union

== Notable people ==
- William Chivous Bostic Sr., physician and researcher
- Christopher Bechtler, German-born goldsmith
- Smoky Burgess, record-setting major league baseball player
- Cordelia Camp, educator and author
- Bryan Coker, 12th President of Maryville College
- Walter Dalton, former lieutenant governor of North Carolina (in office 2009–2013)
- Tim Earley, American poet
- Pleasant Daniel Gold, American publisher and clergyman
- James Holland, former U.S. congressman
- Kay Hooper, best-selling author
- Lewis Jolley, running back for the Houston Oilers
- Robert McNair, former owner of the Houston Texans
- Phil Prince, 12th president of Clemson University
- Merle Davis Umstead, former first lady of North Carolina
- Felix Walker, former U.S. congressman

== See also ==
- List of counties in North Carolina
- National Register of Historic Places listings in Rutherford County, North Carolina
