= National Register of Historic Places listings in Rutherford County, North Carolina =

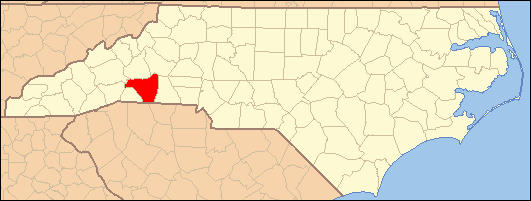

This list includes properties and districts listed on the National Register of Historic Places in Rutherford County, North Carolina. Click the "Map of all coordinates" link to the right to view a Google map of all properties and districts with latitude and longitude coordinates in the table below.

== Current listings ==
This National Park Service list is complete through NPS recent listings posted December 12, 2025.

	Name on the Register	Image	Date listed	Location	City or town	Description
1	Alexander Manufacturing Company Mill Village Historic District	Alexander Manufacturing Company Mill Village Historic District	May 15, 2008 (#08000413)	Roughly bounded by Victory and Wilson Drs. and Allen and S. Broadway Sts. 35°18′37″N 81°51′22″W	Forest City	
2	Bechtler Mint Site		April 14, 1997 (#97000316)	342 Gilboa Church Rd. 35°24′49″N 81°58′16″W	Rutherfordton	
3	Bostic Charge Parsonage	Bostic Charge Parsonage	August 28, 2012 (#12000580)	149 Old Sunshine Rd. 35°21′54″N 81°50′03″W	Bostic	
4	Carrier Houses	Carrier Houses	June 19, 1992 (#92000681)	415 and 423 N. Main St. 35°22′11″N 81°57′25″W	Rutherfordton	
5	Carson-Andrews Mill and Ben F.W. Andrews House	Carson-Andrews Mill and Ben F.W. Andrews House	June 4, 2008 (#08000495)	Both sides of NC 1007, east, south, and west of the junction with NC 1796; 35°24′37″N 81°50′13″W	Washburn	
6	Cliffside Public School	Cliffside Public School	January 26, 1998 (#97001667)	1 N. Main St. 35°14′48″N 81°46′10″W	Cliffside	
7	Cool Springs High School	Cool Springs High School	July 8, 1999 (#99000813)	382 W. Main St. 35°20′19″N 81°51′58″W	Forest City	
8	East Main Street Historic District	East Main Street Historic District	December 23, 2005 (#05001450)	Roughly along parts of Arlington St., Carolina Ave., N. Magnolia St., S. Magnolia St., E. Main St., and McBrayer Court; 35°19′56″N 81°51′16″W	Forest City	
9	Forest City Baptist Church	Forest City Baptist Church	September 14, 1989 (#89001417)	301 W. Main St. 35°20′03″N 81°52′09″W	Forest City	
10	Fox Haven Plantation	Fox Haven Plantation	September 14, 1972 (#72000996)	Southwest of Rutherfordton off SR 1157; 35°20′53″N 82°03′13″W	Rutherfordton	
11	Gilbert Town Historic District	Gilbert Town Historic District	August 23, 2006 (#06000726)	Along sections of Rock Rd. (NC 1520) and Old Gilbert Town Rd. (NC 1539); 35°24′25″N 81°56′37″W	Rutherfordton	
12	Henrietta-Caroleen High School	Henrietta-Caroleen High School	December 23, 2005 (#05001451)	2527 NC 221A; 35°16′28″N 81°47′48″W	Mooresboro	
13	James Dexter Ledbetter House	James Dexter Ledbetter House	June 14, 1982 (#82003511)	Off U.S. Route 74; 35°21′11″N 81°54′06″W	Forest City	
14	George W. Logan House	George W. Logan House	February 20, 1986 (#86000312)	SR 1555 at U.S. Route 64; 35°25′02″N 81°53′56″W	Rutherfordton	
15	Main Street Historic District	Main Street Historic District	December 7, 1995 (#95001419)	Roughly bounded by Taylor, Court, Washington, and W. Third Sts. 35°22′04″N 81°57′27″W	Rutherfordton	
16	Main Street Historic District	Main Street Historic District	February 14, 2002 (#02000017)	Roughly bounded by Blanton Alley, Huntley St., Yarboro St., and Broadway St.; also 186 Mill St. 35°19′59″N 81°51′54″W	Forest City	186 Mill represents a boundary increase of June 9, 2004
17	Melton-Davis House	Melton-Davis House	August 29, 2008 (#08000813)	477 DePriest Rd. 35°25′57″N 81°48′52″W	Bostic	
18	Melton-Fortune Farmstead		July 11, 1985 (#85001553)	SR 1006 south of NC 226; 35°30′34″N 81°45′52″W	Golden Valley	
19	Pine Gables	Pine Gables	November 30, 1999 (#99001445)	328 Boys Camp Rd. 35°26′15″N 82°13′45″W	Lake Lure	
20	Rutherford County Courthouse	Rutherford County Courthouse	May 10, 1979 (#79001749)	Main St. between 2nd and 3rd Sts. 35°22′03″N 81°57′28″W	Rutherfordton	
21	Rutherfordton-Spindale Central High School	Rutherfordton-Spindale Central High School	February 3, 1993 (#92001843)	545 Charlotte Rd. 35°21′57″N 81°56′42″W	Rutherfordton	
22	St. Luke's Chapel	St. Luke's Chapel	September 26, 1991 (#91001470)	Junction of Hospital Dr. and Old Twitty Ford Rd. 35°21′41″N 81°57′56″W	Rutherfordton	
23	Trinity Lutheran Church	Trinity Lutheran Church	March 24, 1972 (#72000997)	702 N. Main St. 35°22′21″N 81°57′19″W	Rutherfordton	
24	Washburn Historic District	Washburn Historic District	February 20, 2002 (#02000056)	2401, 2426, and 2436 Bostic-Sunshine Highway, 1391 and 1392 Andrews Mill Rd., 126-156 and 157 Salem Church Rd.; also 1037 Gun Club Rd. 35°23′42″N 81°48′59″W	Bostic	1037 Gun Club represents a boundary increase of January 25, 2006
25	T. Max Watson House	T. Max Watson House	October 15, 2001 (#01001110)	297 E. Main St. 35°19′58″N 81°51′33″W	Forest City	
26	West Main Street Historic District	West Main Street Historic District	December 20, 2006 (#06001142)	121 Cool Springs Dr., 343-499 W. Maine St., and 121 Memorial Dr. 35°20′20″N 81°52′23″W	Forest City	

== See also ==
- National Register of Historic Places listings in North Carolina
- List of National Historic Landmarks in North Carolina
