= Hugh Edward White =

American architect

Hugh Edward White (June 27, 1869 – June 25, 1939) was an American architect active primarily in South Carolina and North Carolina. Best known for his work in Gastonia, North Carolina during the city's textile boom of the early 20th century, White and his firm undertook nearly 300 documented projects over a career spanning more than four decades. Working largely in Beaux-Arts Classical, Colonial Revival, and Tudor Revival styles, he became the principal architect in his adopted community of Gastonia.

== Early life and education ==
White was born in Fort Mill, York County, South Carolina, to Leonidas Spratt White and Dorcas Ann Culp White. He was named for his great-grandfather Hugh White, a member of a Scotch-Irish migration from Lancaster County, Pennsylvania in the 18th century.

White's father died in 1878 and his mother in 1885. He and his sisters were subsequently raised by their aunt, Lizzie Culp.

Like many architects of his era, White developed his architectural skills through practical experience and a correspondence course rather than formal architectural schooling. A 1930s article in the Gastonia Daily Gazette described him as beginning his career in a woodworking plant, advancing to foreman, and later entering architectural work through experience and study.

== Early career (1890s–1918) ==
White began professional architectural practice in Rock Hill, South Carolina, where he worked from approximately 1894 to 1902 or 1903 and again in 1907–1908. He advertised locally as "H. Edward White, Architect," offering plans, specifications, and estimates for residences, commercial buildings, churches, and public structures.

In Rock Hill, White designed at least twenty residences, primarily in Queen Anne and Colonial Revival styles, as well as several commercial buildings. He also took commissions in other South Carolina communities.

During the 1890s he spent a brief period in Atlanta, working as a draftsman in an architectural office, although the identity of the firm has not been determined.

From 1903 to 1918, White worked as a field supervisor for the U.S. Treasury Department's Office of the Supervising Architect. In that capacity he supervised construction of federal buildings, including post offices in Virginia, Mississippi, Georgia, and North Carolina, including projects in Hickory and Gastonia.

This work, together with his subsequent employment with architect Charles C. Wilson, gave White experience with national architectural styles, construction systems, and their adaptation to regional settings.

A certificate dated December 6, 1916, records White's election to the American Institute of Architects.

== Move to Gastonia and partnership (1919–1926) ==
According to family tradition, architect Charles C. Wilson sent White to Gastonia around 1919 to supervise construction of the Joseph Separk House, a Renaissance Revival residence for a textile executive. White and his family were living in Gastonia by the 1920 United States Census, and the 1921–1922 Gastonia city directory listed him as manager of Wilson's Gastonia architectural office.

=== White, Streeter & Chamberlain ===
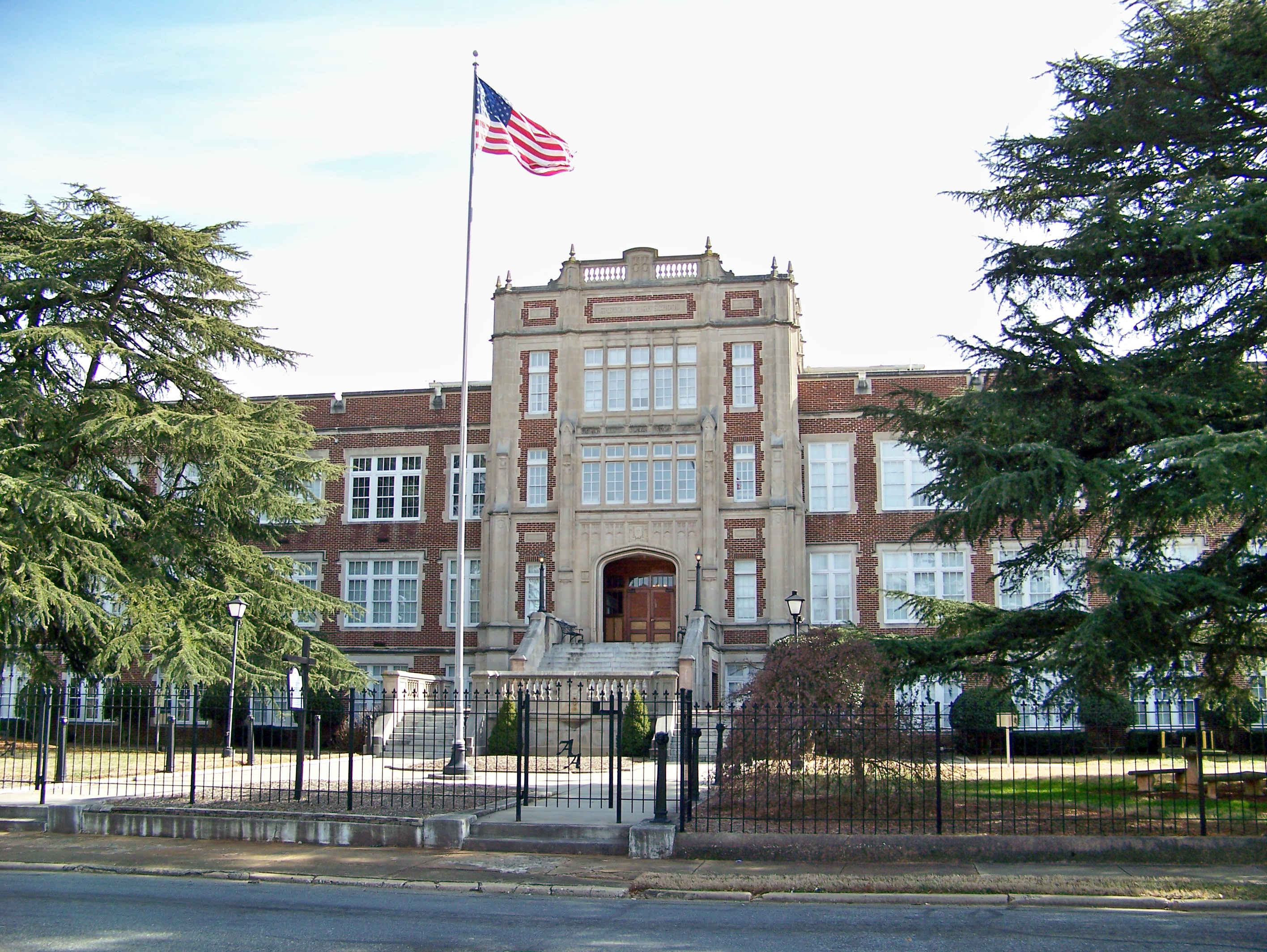
The former Gastonia High School, designed by White, Streeter & Chamberlain and completed in 1924.

In 1921, White formed an architectural partnership with Charles J. Streeter, a longtime employee of the Treasury Department's Office of the Supervising Architect, and Carroll W. Chamberlain, a Syracuse University-trained architect who had also worked for the federal government. Both had worked in Wilson's office.

The new firm, White, Streeter & Chamberlain, won the commission for the $500,000 Gastonia High School. The Tudor Revival school was completed in 1924, and the project established the firm's reputation in Gastonia and the surrounding region.

Even before the school was completed, the firm attracted prominent residential commissions, including the Samuel Pinckney Stowe House, later known as Stowe Manor, in Belmont, North Carolina. Architectural historian Davyd Foard Hood identified the Stowe house as the most elaborate and costly residence designed by either the partnership or White in his later independent practice.

During the early and mid-1920s, the firm designed educational, public, institutional, commercial, religious, and residential buildings in Gastonia and other textile communities in the western Piedmont. Its commissions included the Gastonia Municipal Building, Citizens National Bank, and numerous residences in Gastonia's York-Chester neighborhood.

According to White's son, the partners generally divided responsibilities among themselves: White handled construction supervision and marketing, Streeter prepared working drawings, and Chamberlain handled specifications.

In 1926, White received a license in his own name to practice architecture in North Carolina through a reciprocal arrangement with South Carolina, where he was already registered.

=== Firm dissolution ===
The partnership ended in late 1926. According to White family tradition, the dissolution followed the cancellation of the proposed Oasis Temple Building in Charlotte. The firm completed drawings for the large classical building, but construction bids opened in August 1926 exceeded expectations and the project did not proceed. The firm reportedly went unpaid for much of the work it had invested in the project.

== Independent practice (1927–1939) ==
After the firm dissolved, White continued practicing independently in Gastonia. He maintained an office in the Commercial National Bank Building until 1930 and subsequently worked from an office in his home.

From 1927 to 1930, he continued designing residences, schools, churches, civic buildings, and health facilities. His work included Tudor Revival residences as well as projects employing newer architectural forms, including the Art Deco–Moderne Webb Theater and the Gastonia War Memorial, which featured a fortress-like central tower and an arcaded porch.

=== Work during the Great Depression ===
The onset of the Great Depression sharply reduced architectural commissions. White's surviving records document only a few projects from 1931 through 1934. To earn additional income, he researched and published an "Industrial and Farm Map of Gaston County, North Carolina" in 1931, which he sold throughout the county for cash or farm produce.

As economic conditions improved in the mid-1930s, White expanded his practice again and moved his office to the National Bank of Commerce in downtown Gastonia. He designed smaller residences and additions suited to clients with restricted budgets and published a 1936 promotional booklet featuring modest Tudor and Colonial Revival house designs.

White also designed the Clarence A. Ross House in Gastonia, dated 1936 in the North Carolina Architects & Builders catalogue, which its biographical account identifies as a modernist residence.

His later healthcare and educational work included the Gaston County Negro Hospital in Gastonia, dated 1937, and Gastonia Junior High School, also known as Yorkchester Junior High School, dated 1938. The Cramerton Gymnasium, dated 1939, was among his last projects.

== Selected works ==
Selected projects by White, both independently and with White, Streeter & Chamberlain, include the following. Dates follow the cited architectural records; construction and rebuilding periods are identified where specified.

Selected architectural works
Building	Location	Recorded date or period
Gastonia High School	Gastonia, North Carolina	1922–1924; construction.
Citizens National Bank	Gastonia, North Carolina	1924.
Samuel Pinckney Stowe House (Stowe Manor)	Belmont, North Carolina	1924–1925; rebuilding after a 1924 fire, using the original and supplementary plans.
Rutherfordton-Spindale Central High School	Rutherfordton, North Carolina	1924–1925; construction.
Gastonia Municipal Building	Gastonia, North Carolina	1925.
Webb Theater	Gastonia, North Carolina	c. 1927.
Gastonia War Memorial	Gastonia, North Carolina	c. 1928.
Clarence A. Ross House	Gastonia, North Carolina	1936.
Gaston County Negro Hospital	Gastonia, North Carolina	1937.
Gastonia Junior High School	Gastonia, North Carolina	1938.
Cramerton Gymnasium	Cramerton, North Carolina	1939.

== Death and legacy ==
White died on June 25, 1939, two days before his seventieth birthday. The Gastonia Daily Gazette praised his contributions to Gastonia and Gaston County and noted his involvement in local civic improvement. He was buried at Hollywood Cemetery in Gastonia.

His widow, Mary Green White, lived until 1948. Their son, Hugh Edward White II, followed his father into the profession. After working for a time in his father's office, he enrolled at the Georgia Institute of Technology in 1940 to study architecture and later helped establish Freeman White Associates in Charlotte.

White's career and buildings are documented in the North Carolina Architects & Builders project at NC State University. Its biographical account and selected building list draw on the 2005 publication The Works of Hugh Edward White and White, Streeter & Chamberlain and earlier research by architectural historian Davyd Foard Hood.
