= Bostic =

Bostic is a surname. Notable people with the surname include:

- Caleb Bostic (born 1988), American football linebacker
- Earl Bostic (1913–1965), American saxophonist
- Jameson Bostic (born 1984), American boxer
- Jason Bostic (born 1976), American football defensive back
- Jeff Bostic (born 1958), American football player
- Jeffrey Bostic (born 1960), Barbadian politician
- Jenn Bostic (born 1986), American Country and Western singer and songwriter
- Jim Bostic (born 1972), American basketball player
- Joe Bostic (born 1957), American football offensive lineman
- John Bostic (born 1962), American football defensive back
- Jon Bostic (born 1991), American football linebacker
- Keith Bostic (American football) (born 1961), American football player in the NFL
- Keith Bostic (software engineer) (born 1959), American computer programmer
- Raphael Bostic (born 1966), American economist
- William Chivous Bostic Sr. (1877–1957), American physician

== See also ==
- Bostic, North Carolina
