= George Washington Logan =

American politician

George Washington Logan (February 22, 1815 – October 18, 1889) was a North Carolina politician who served in the Confederate States Congress during the American Civil War as a peace and Unionist candidate.

Logan was born in Rutherford County, North Carolina. He served as Clerk of County Court (1841–1849), County Solicitor (1855–1856), member of the Confederate Congress (1863–1865), delegate from Rutherford County to the State Convention (1865) and Brigadier General of the Division of North Carolina Troops.

Elected to serve in the Second Confederate Congress from 1864 to 1865 "for the two-fold purpose of opposing tyranny and keeping out of the rebel army," Logan was a Unionist and opponent of Confederate President Jefferson Davis. He was thought to be involved in the Red Strings, a Unionist movement within the Confederacy. After the Civil War he served in the North Carolina State Legislature from 1866 to 1868 as a member of the Republican Party and served as a Superior Court Judge (1868–1874).

As a Judge, he was a foe of the Ku Klux Klan and in 1874 Judge Logan was defeated by one of his enemies David Schenck, a member of the Klan. As a native white member of the Reconstruction Republican Party, Logan was known as a "scalawag", but was strongly opposed to the policies (and possible corruption) enacted by Governor William Woods Holden.

In State v. Reinhardt and Love (1869), Judge Logan ordered a verdict of "not guilty" for a case involving Alexander Reinhardt, a "person of color" and Alice Love, a white woman, despite North Carolina's Marriage Act of 1838 banning interracial marriage.

The George W. Logan House was added to the National Register of Historic Places in 1986. In 1866, he purchased the property now known as Pine Gables and listed on the National Register of Historic Places in 1999.
