= Lake Lure Classical Academy =

Charter school in Lake Lure, North Carolina, US

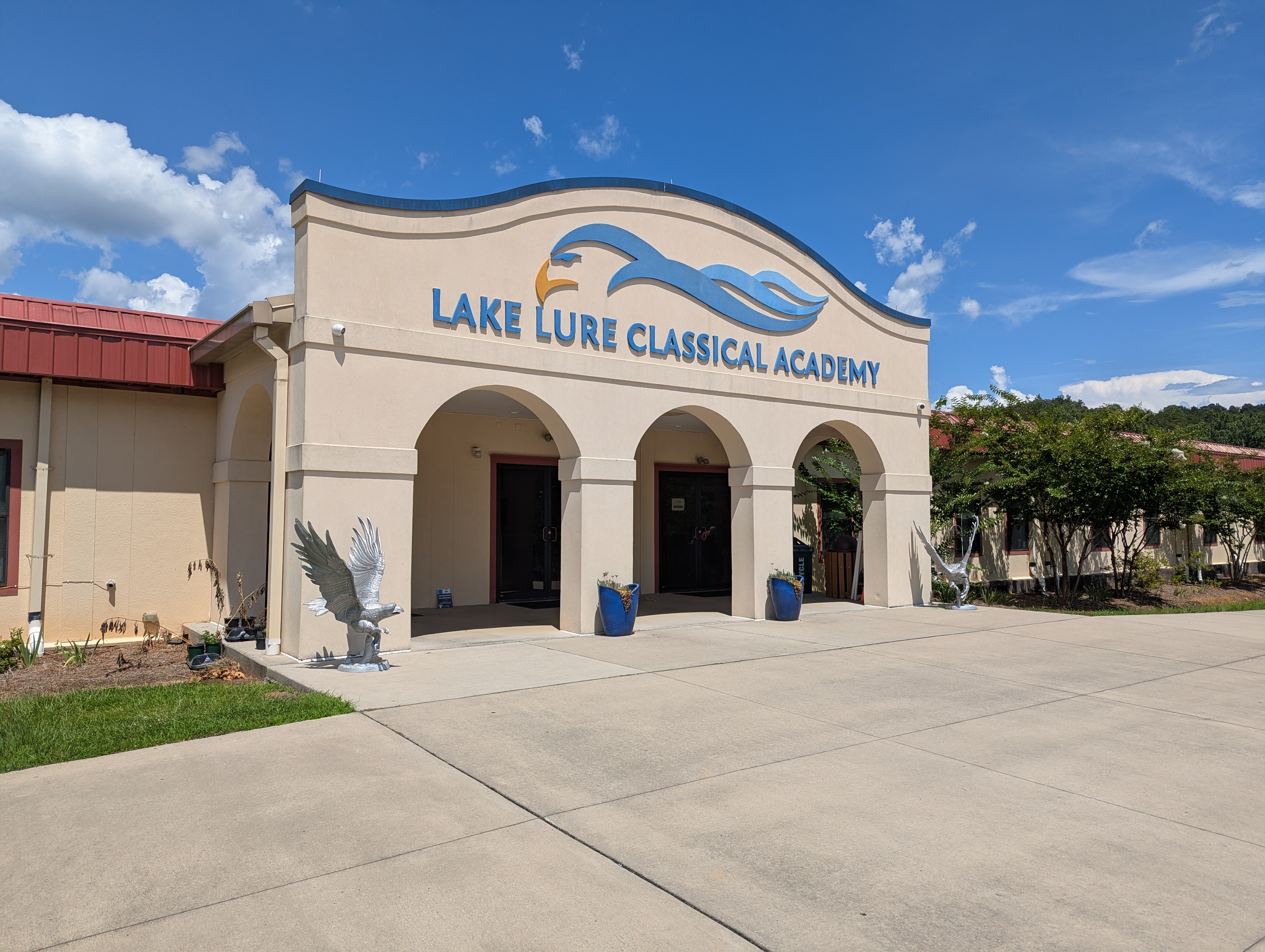

Location
- 1058 Island Creek Road; Lake Lure, North Carolina 28746; United States; 35°24′27″N 82°11′34″W

Information
- Type: Charter school
- Motto: “To offer a classical, knowledge‑based education that fosters critical thinking, civic responsibility, and virtue for all.”
- Established: 2010 (16 years ago)
- Principal: Dr. Genie Phipps (K-5); Michael Smith (6-12)
- Teaching staff: 28 (FTE)
- Grades: K-12
- Enrollment: 442 (2024-2025)
- Student to teacher ratio: 16:1
- Colors: Navy blue, white and gold
- Mascot: Bird of prey
- Nickname: Raptors
- Newspaper: The Mountain Breeze
- Yearbook: Yearbook Avenue
- Founder(s): Caroline Upchurch; Jim Proctor; Russ Pitts
- Website: www.llcharter.org

Lake Lure Classical Academy (often abbreviated to LLCA) is a K-12 tuition-free public charter school located in Lake Lure, North Carolina. It is the first school built in Lake Lure since 1927.

== History ==
In 1927, the Lake Lure Development Company built a school in Lake Lure and gave it to the Rutherford County School System. In 1961, Rutherford County consolidated its public-school district and closed the school. After recognizing the need for a local school after nearly 50 years without one, Lake Lure Classical Academy was formed in 2010 as a K-7 charter school by community leaders Caroline Upchurch, Jim Proctor, and Russ Pitts. Its first year enrolled 44 students. The school later broke ground on a permanent campus in 2014, becoming a K-12 charter school. The school's gymnatorium opened in 2019.

In 2024, the school's theatre department, led by the school's art teacher Layne Long, won six accolades for their performance of Don Zolidis' The Price at the Charlotte Catholic High School site of the 2024 North Carolina Theatre Conference High School Play Festival; including the Festival Spirit Award and the Distinguished Play Award. Michael Smith, an assistant principal for the school, commented; "I am so proud of Mrs. Long and her theatre troupe. They have worked hard to bring a wonderful play to life, and they have brought so much positive energy to the school during the process. The arts are a vital part of classical education, and it is wonderful to see them flourishing here at LLCA."

=== LGBTQ club controversy ===
In November 2015, the Board of Directors of LLCA cancelled all extra-curricular clubs within the school, following complaints from numerous parents about a club focusing around the LGBTQ community known as the "Gay-Straight Alliance Club". Some parents threatened to pull their children from the school over the club, and others threatened to sue the school. The American Civil Liberties Union of North Carolina Legal Foundation (ACLU-NCLF) later urged the school to rescind the ban. The suspension was labeled a temporary measure while the board sought legal advice. The following month, the board reinstated all of the clubs, along with a new policy that requires elementary and middle school students to obtain parental consent to join clubs.
