= Pine Gables =

Historic district in North Carolina, United States

- U.S. National Register of Historic Places
- U.S. Historic district
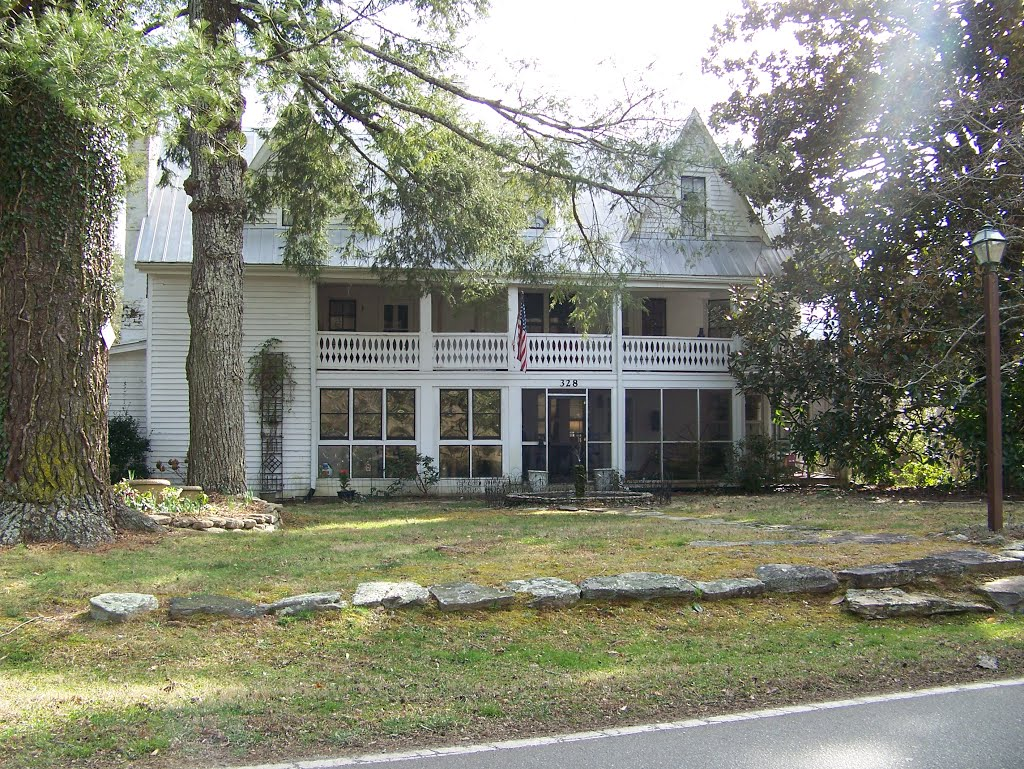
- Pine Gables, 2013

- Location within North Carolina Location within the United States
- Location: 328 Boys Camp Rd., Lake Lure, North Carolina
- Coordinates: 35°26′15″N 82°13′45″W
- Area: 9.3 acres (3.8 ha)
- Architectural style: Queen Anne
- NRHP reference No.: 99001445
- Added to NRHP: November 30, 1999

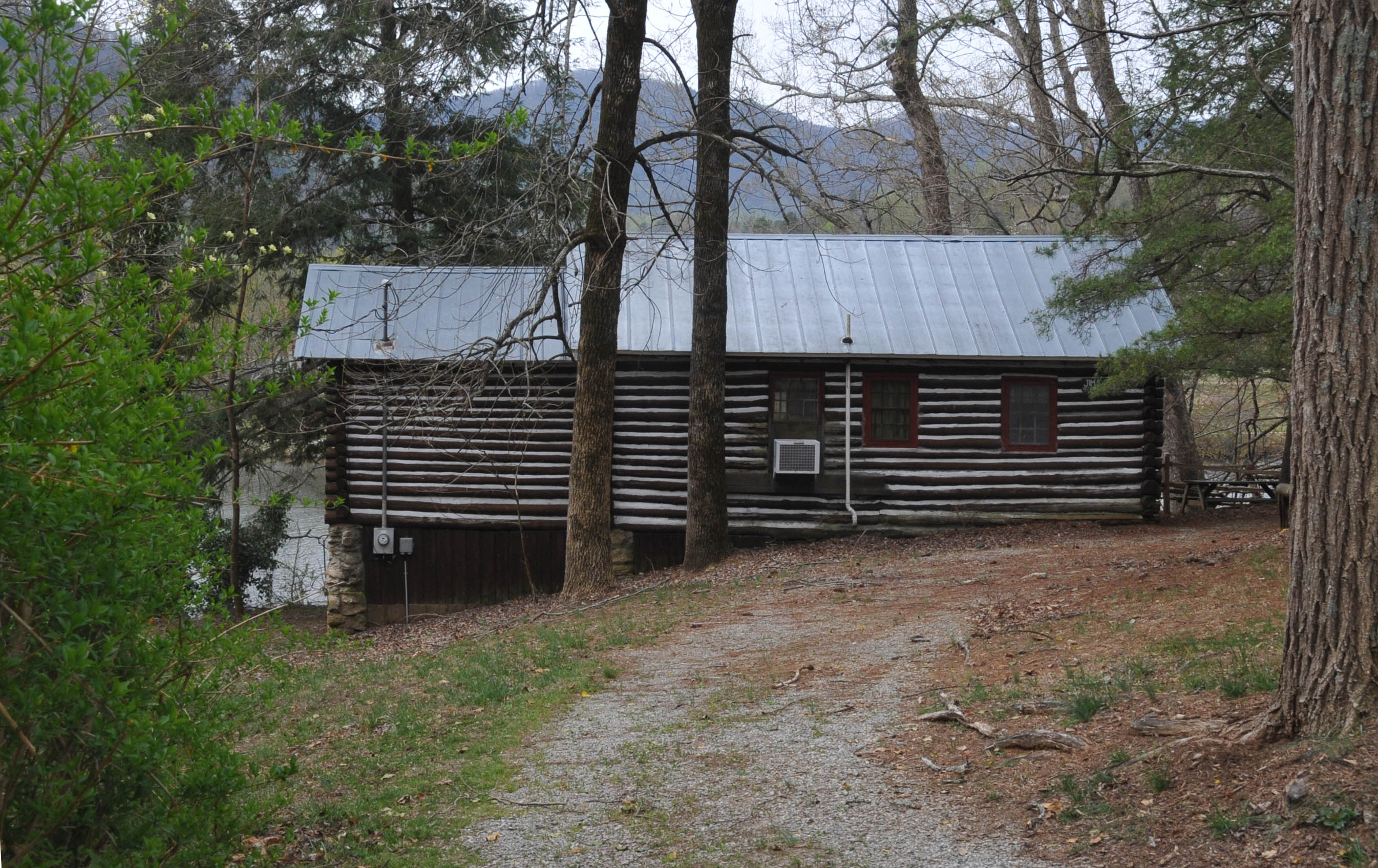
Cabin at Pine Gables, September 2007

Pine Gables, also known as Logan House and Harris Inn, is a historic inn complex and national historic district located near Lake Lure, Rutherford County, North Carolina. The property encompasses 10 contributing buildings, 5 contributing sites, and 3 contributing structures. The original log sections of the inn dates to about 1800, and enlarged and modified in 1834, 1877, and 1924. It is a 2 1/2-story, frame building with high pitched gables in a vernacular Queen Anne style. Also on the property are the contributing Old Tearoom (c. 1877, c. 1924, c. 1937) now used as a single family dwelling, a one-story stone structure (c. 1877), seven guest cabins (c. 1924-1948), a craft shop (c. 1937), rock wall (c. 1934), three ponds (c. 1949), a segment of Old Highway 20 (c. 1921), and the shoreline of Lake Lure (c. 1927). Judge George Washington Logan (1815-1889), who also owned the George W. Logan House at Rutherfordton, bought the inn in 1866 and it became known as the "Logan House". During the Great Depression, the inn and surrounding property was used to promote economic recovery as a Civilian Conservation Corps (CCC) headquarters.

It was added to the National Register of Historic Places in 1999.
