= Dave Robbins (basketball) =

American basketball player-coach

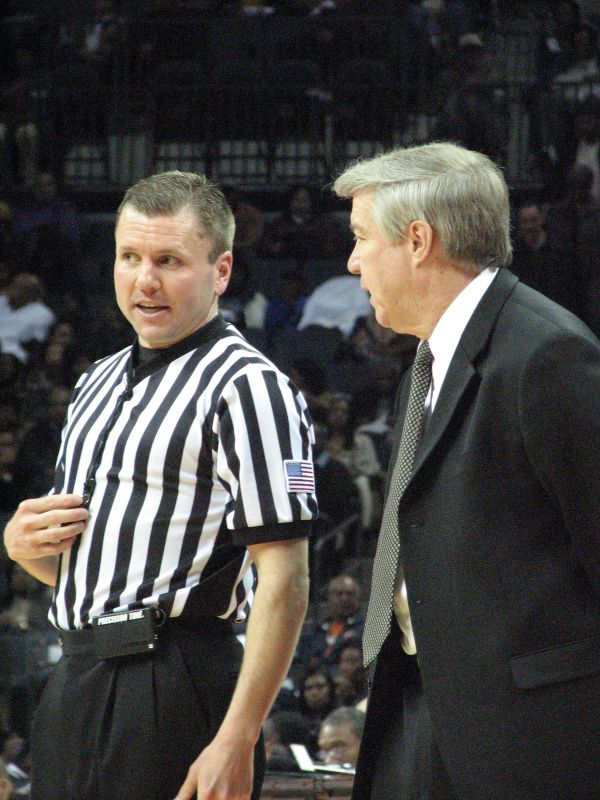
- Robbins (right) speaking with an official

Biographical details
- Born: September 10, 1942 (age 84)

Coaching career (HC unless noted)
- 1978–2008: Virginia Union

Head coaching record
- Overall: 713–194

Accomplishments and honors

Championships
- 3 NCAA Division II (1980, 1992, 2005); 14 CIAA (1979, 1980, 1985, 1987, 1989, 1991–1995, 1998, 2004–2006)
- College Basketball Hall of Fame; Inducted in 2012

David Robbins (born September 10, 1942) is an American former college basketball coach. Robbins is known for coaching at NCAA Division II power Virginia Union University, where he won 713 games and three NCAA Division II men's basketball tournament titles. Out of all NCAA coaches who have won more than 700 wins, Robbins is the second winningest coach with a winning percentage of 0.786 (713 wins, 194 losses). He is second only to Adolph Rupp, who had a winning percentage of 0.822.

Robbins announced his retirement on April 15, 2008. He is a member of the National Collegiate Basketball Hall of Fame, inducted in 2012.

== Early life ==
Robbins grew up in Gastonia, North Carolina and played football, basketball, and ran track at Frank L. Ashley High School. He was recruited to play basketball at Catawba College, but also played football and ran track. Robbins coached at Thomas Jefferson High School in Richmond, Virginia where he led his 1975 team to the AAA State Championship prior to moving to Virginia Union University in 1978.

== College coaching career ==
Robbins began coaching the Virginia Union Panthers in 1978, becoming the first white head coach in the history of the Central Intercollegiate Athletic Association (CIAA), a conference consisting of Historically black colleges and universities. His hiring was highly controversial as many saw the hiring of a white coach as taking away opportunities from African-American candidates.

During his 30-year career, Robbins led his teams to a record of 713-194 and three NCAA Division II National Championships in 1980, 1992 and 2005. His teams won 14 CIAA championships and garnered 21 NCAA tournament appearances. During his time at VUU, Robbins produced four Division II players of the year, eight Consensus first team All-Americans, and five NBA players: Ben Wallace, Charles Oakley, Terry Davis, AJ English, and Jamie Waller.

Robbins officially retired on April 15, 2008, turning the program over to long-time assistant Willard Coker.

== Legacy ==
Robbins is a member of the Catawba College, Virginia Union University, CIAA, Thomas Jefferson High School, and Gaston County (NC) Halls of Fame. In 2010, Robbins was inducted into the Virginia Sports Hall of Fame and Museum. In 2012, Robbins was elected to the National Collegiate Basketball Hall of Fame. In 2017, Robbins was inducted into the Small College Basketball Hall of Fame. Most recently in April 2022, Robbins was inducted into the North Carolina Sports Hall of Fame.

== See also ==
- List of college men's basketball coaches with 600 wins
