= Gastonia High School =

Historic school building in North Carolina, United States

- U.S. National Register of Historic Places
- U.S. Historic district – Contributing property
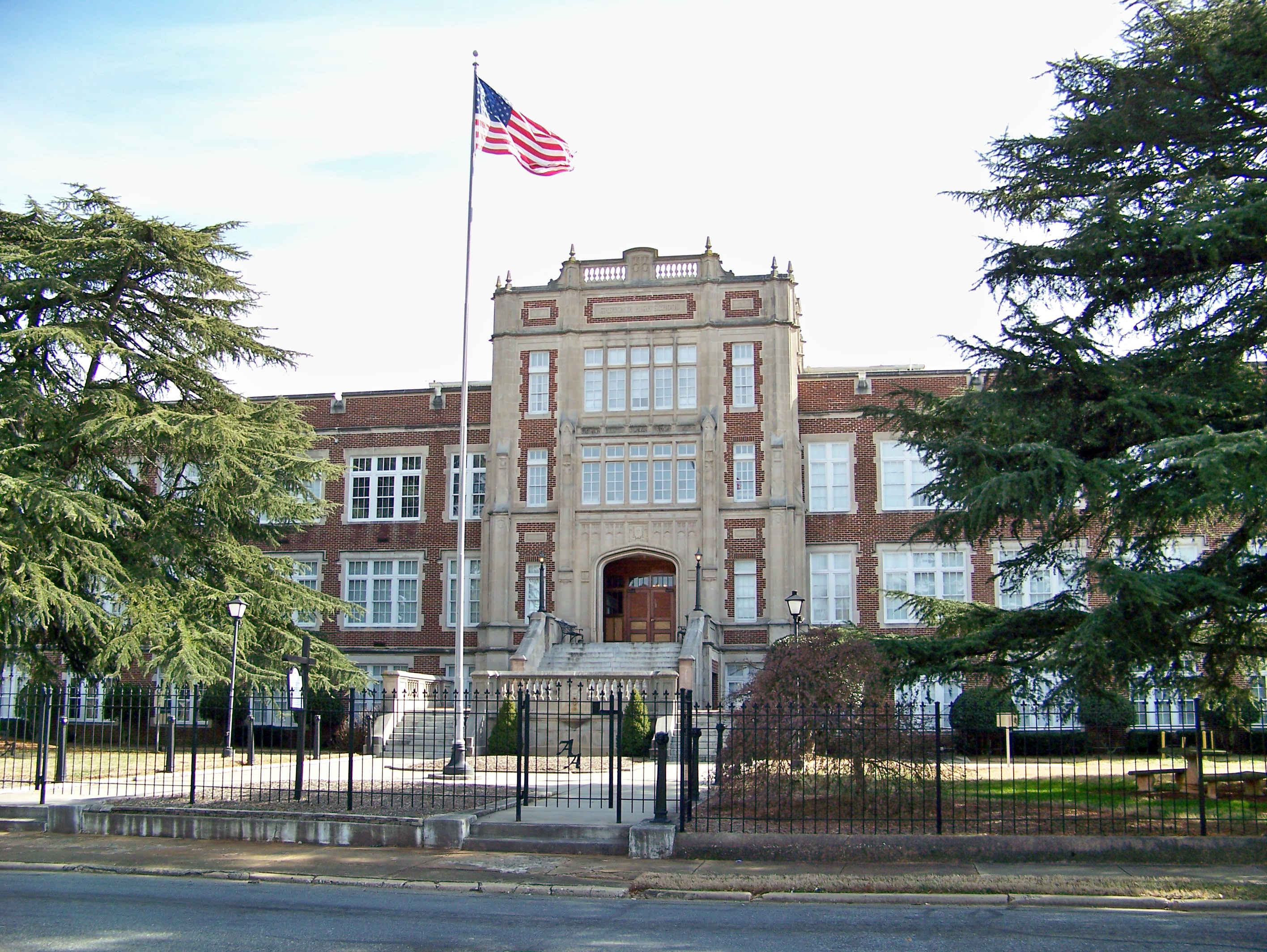

- Location within North Carolina Location within the United States
- Location: S. York St., Gastonia, North Carolina
- Coordinates: 35°15′10″N 81°11′19″W
- Area: 7.9 acres (3.2 ha)
- Built: 1922-1924
- Architect: White, Hugh, Sr.
- Architectural style: Tudor Revival
- NRHP reference No.: 83001884
- Added to NRHP: March 17, 1983

Gastonia High School (later renamed Frank L. Ashley High School) is a historic high school building located at Gastonia, Gaston County, North Carolina. It was designed by Hugh Edward White and built in 1922–1924. It is a five-story, heavily ornamented E-shaped Tudor Revival-style red brick school. It has a flat roof with parapet and features a four-bay projecting frontispiece and two-story, elegantly finished, auditorium. It has a six bays long and three bays wide addition built in 1955.

In 1955, the school was renamed Frank L. Ashley High School. Ashley High School's last graduating class was in 1970.

It was listed on the National Register of Historic Places in 1983. It is located in the York-Chester Historic District.

== Notable alumni ==
- Crash Davis – MLB second baseman
- Whitey Lockman – MLB first baseman and outfielder, coach, manager and front office executive
- Rube Melton – MLB pitcher
- Dave Robbins – college basketball head coach, member of the College Basketball Hall of Fame
