= St. Luke's Chapel (Rutherfordton, North Carolina) =

- U.S. National Register of Historic Places
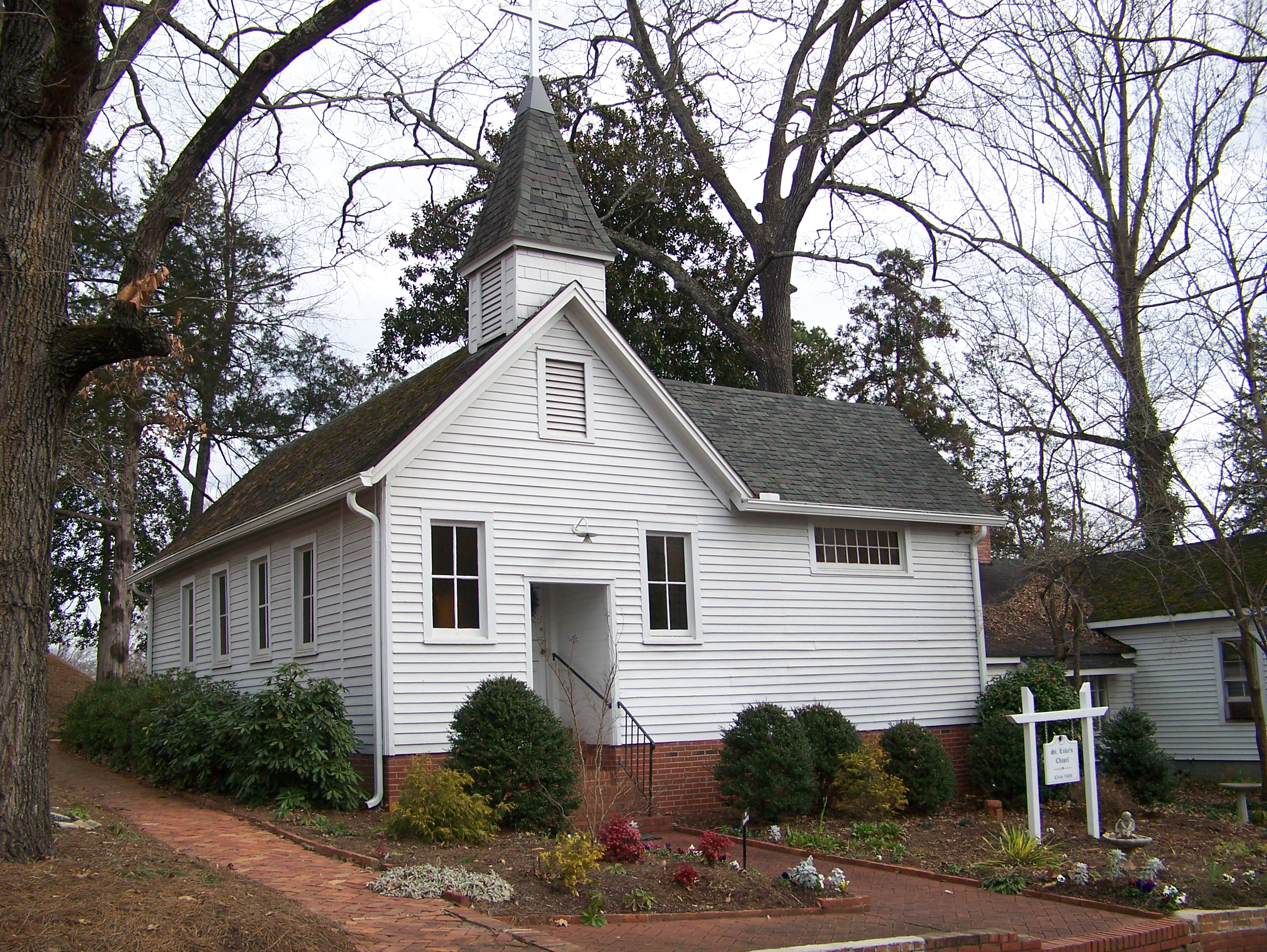
- St. Luke's Chapel, January 2013

- Location within North Carolina Location within the United States
- Location: Jct. of Hospital Dr. and Old Twitty Ford Rd., Rutherfordton, North Carolina
- Coordinates: 35°21′41″N 81°57′56″W
- Built: 1908
- Architectural style: Gothic Revival, Vernacular Gothic Revival
- NRHP reference No.: 91001470
- Added to NRHP: September 26, 1991

St. Luke's Chapel is a historic chapel located in Rutherfordton, Rutherford County, North Carolina.

The chapel was commissioned by Dr. and Mrs. Henry Norris of Philadelphia, founders of Rutherford Hospital, to serve its staff and patients, arising out of the Social Gospel Movement.

Completed in 1908, it is a small, one-story, frame, vernacular Gothic Revival style gable-front building. A one-story gable-roofed frame wing was added about 1915. It was restored in 1945 and again in 1965, and had its exterior renovated in 1991. It is the oldest building on the grounds of Rutherford Hospital, and the only remaining original building.

It was added to the National Register of Historic Places in 1991.
