= Carrier Houses =

Historic house in North Carolina, United States

- U.S. National Register of Historic Places
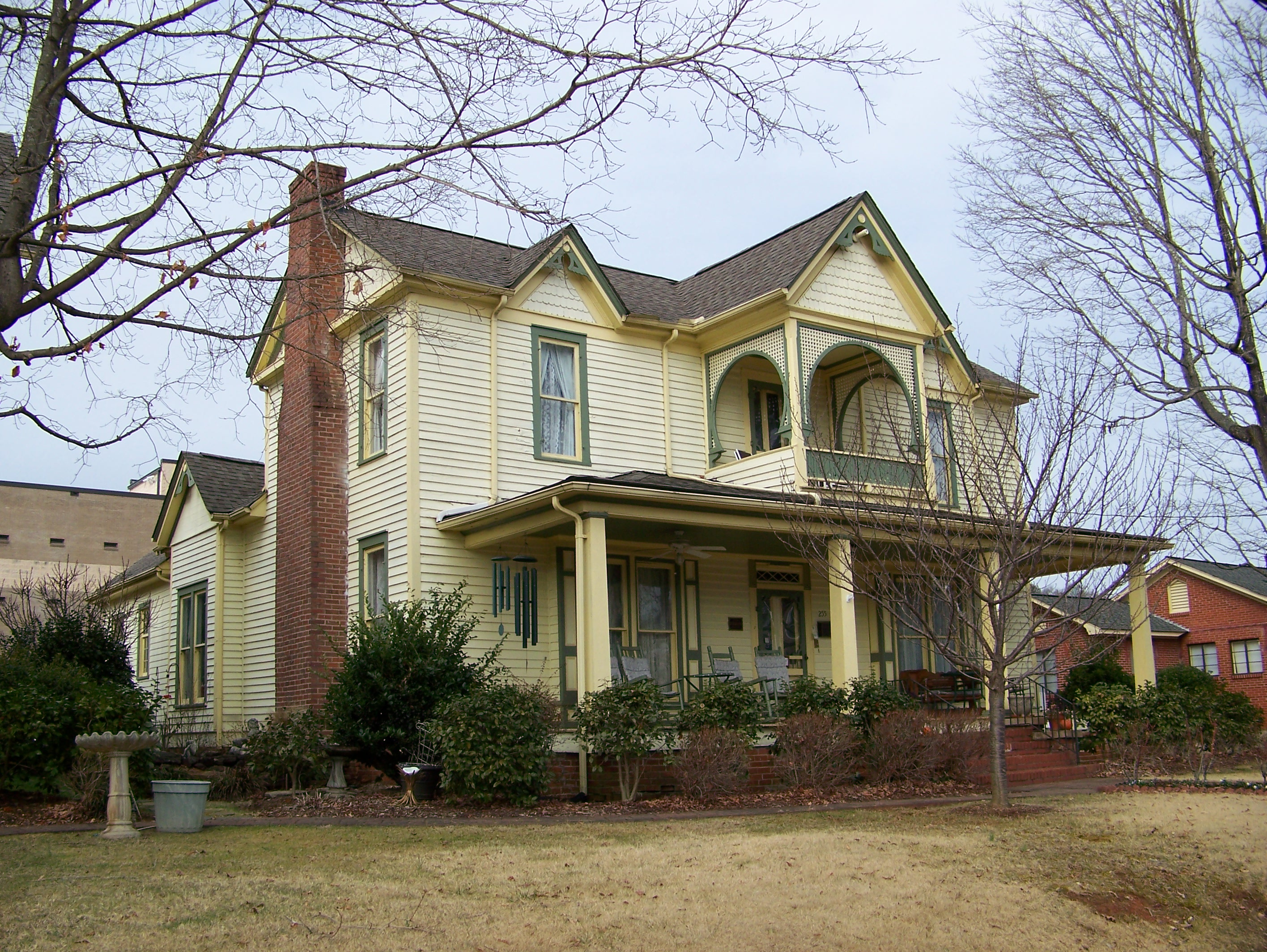
- Carrier-McBrayer House, January 2014

- Location within North Carolina Location within the United States
- Location: 415 and 423 N. Main St., Rutherfordton, North Carolina
- Coordinates: 35°22′11″N 81°57′25″W
- Area: 0.5 acres (0.20 ha)
- Built: c. 1835, 1879
- Built by: Harvey Dewey Carrier
- Architectural style: Queen Anne, Transit. Federal/Gr. Revival
- NRHP reference No.: 92000681
- Added to NRHP: June 19, 1992

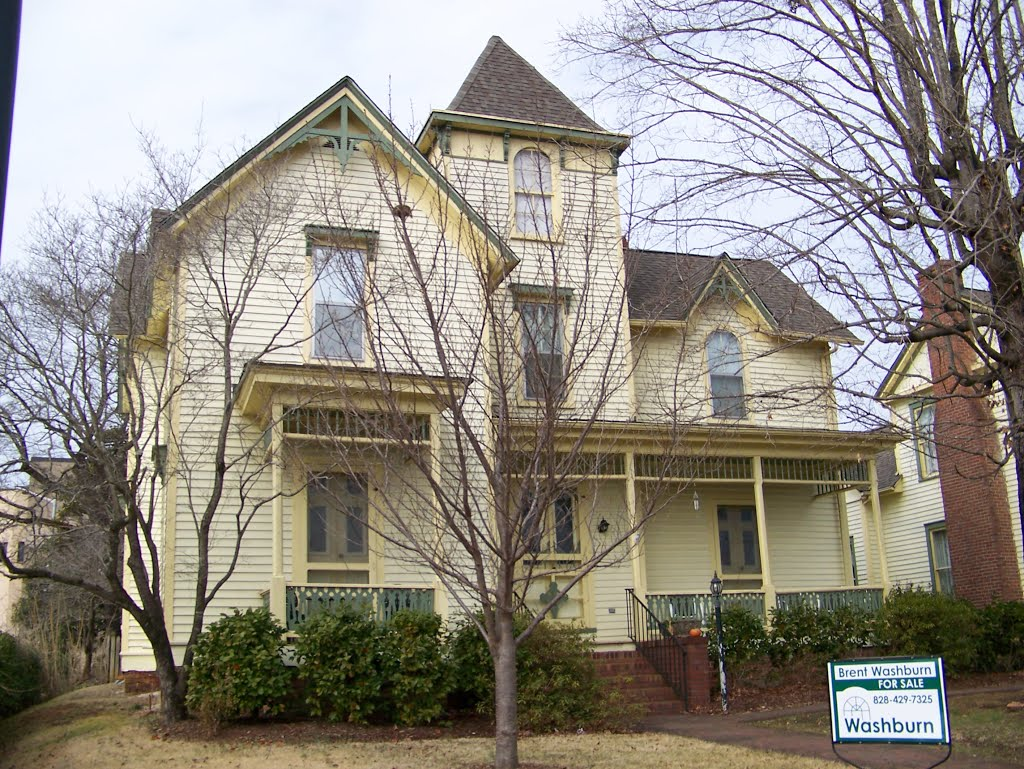
Carrier-Ward House, 2014

Carrier Houses, also known as the Carrier-Ward House and Carrier-McBrayer House, are two historic homes located near Rutherfordton, Rutherford County, North Carolina. The Carrier-Ward House was built in 1879, and is a two-story, weatherboarded, side-gabled Queen Anne-style frame house. It has a front projecting wing and a three-story square tower with pyramidal roof. The Carrier-McBrayer House was built about 1835, and is a transitional Federal / Greek Revival style I-house with two-story ell. The weatherboarded house sits on a brick foundation.

It was added to the National Register of Historic Places in 1992.
