= Rutherfordton-Spindale Middle School =

Historic school building in North Carolina, United States

- Rutherfordton-Spindale Central High School
- U.S. National Register of Historic Places
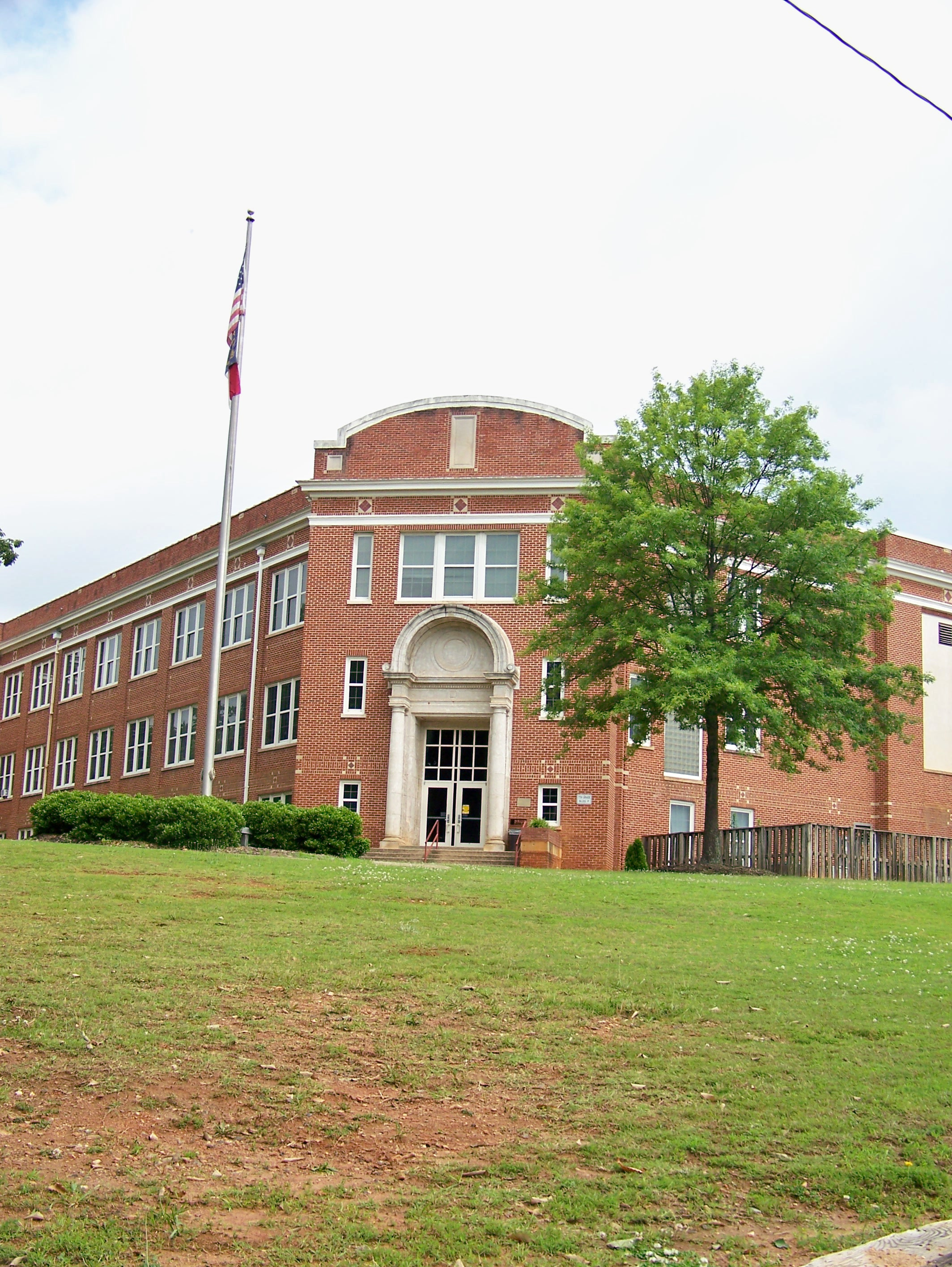
- Rutherfordton-Spindale Middle School, June 2013

- Location within North Carolina Location within the United States
- Location: 545 Charlotte Rd., Rutherfordton, North Carolina
- Coordinates: 35.365°N 81.9446°W
- Area: 8 acres (3.2 ha)
- Built: 1924-1925, 1938-1939
- Architectural style: Classical Revival
- NRHP reference No.: 92001843
- Added to NRHP: February 3, 1993

Rutherfordton-Spindale Middle School is a historic school building located in Rutherfordton, Rutherford County, North Carolina. It was designed by architect Hugh Edward White (1869-1939) and built in 1924–1925. It is a three-story, "L"-plan, Classical Revival-style red brick building. The classroom wing was rebuilt following a fire in 1938. A separate Vocational Education Building was added to the school in 1939. It sits on landscaped grounds designed by Earle Sumner Draper (1893–1994).

It was added to the National Register of Historic Places in 1993 as the Rutherfordton-Spindale Central High School.
