= York-Chester Historic District =

Historic district in North Carolina, United States

- U.S. National Register of Historic Places
- U.S. Historic district
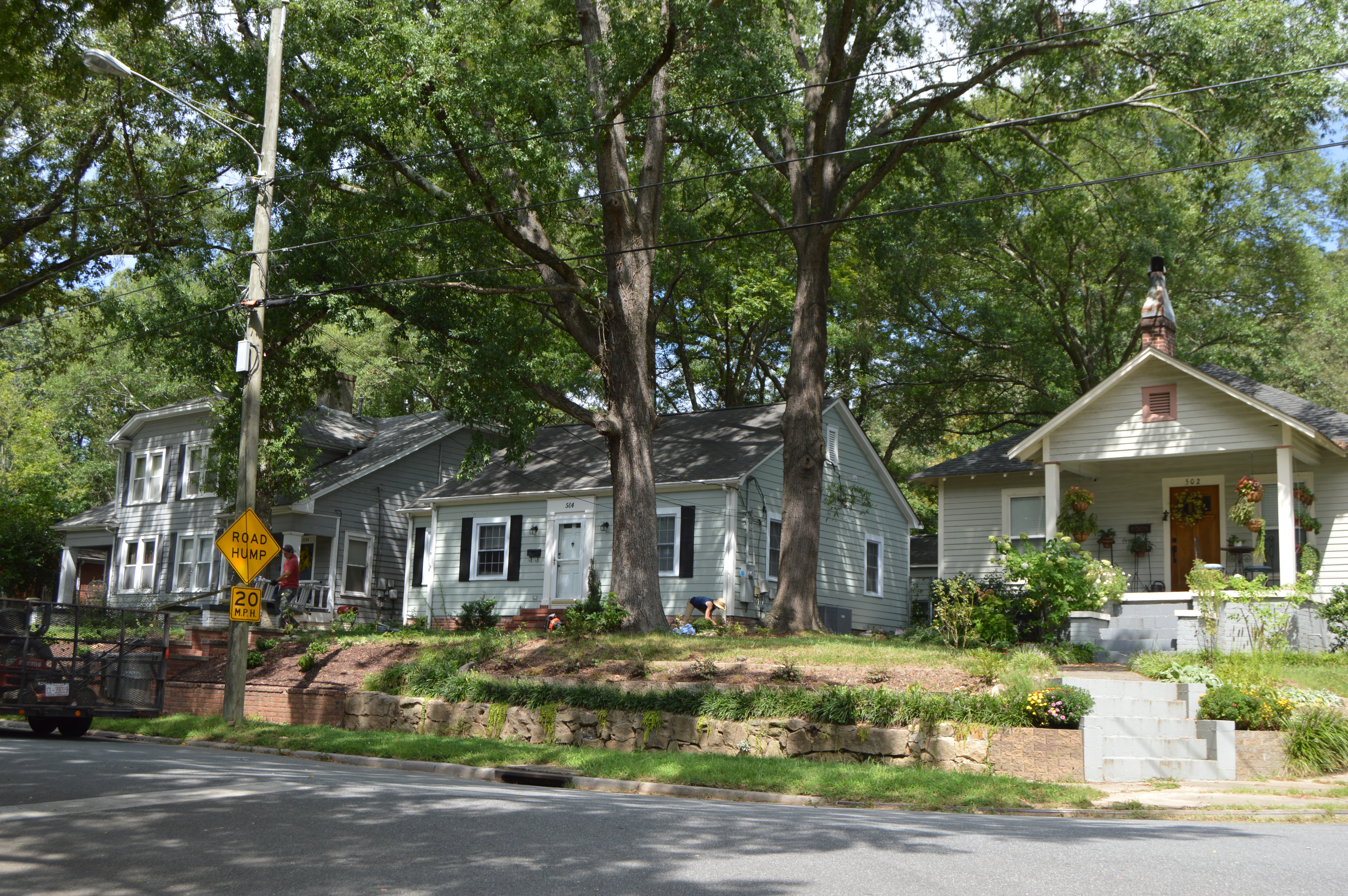
- Houses on Sixth Avenue west of the Jackson Street intersection

- Location within North Carolina Location within the United States
- Location: Bounded by W. Franklin Boulevard, W. 2nd Ave., South St., W. 10th Ave., W. 8th Ave. and S. Clay St., Gastonia, North Carolina
- Coordinates: 35°15′19″N 81°11′18″W
- Area: 193 acres (78 ha)
- Architect: Hugh Edward White, C.C. Wilson
- Architectural style: Queen Anne, Bungalow/craftsman
- NRHP reference No.: 05000941
- Added to NRHP: September 1, 2005

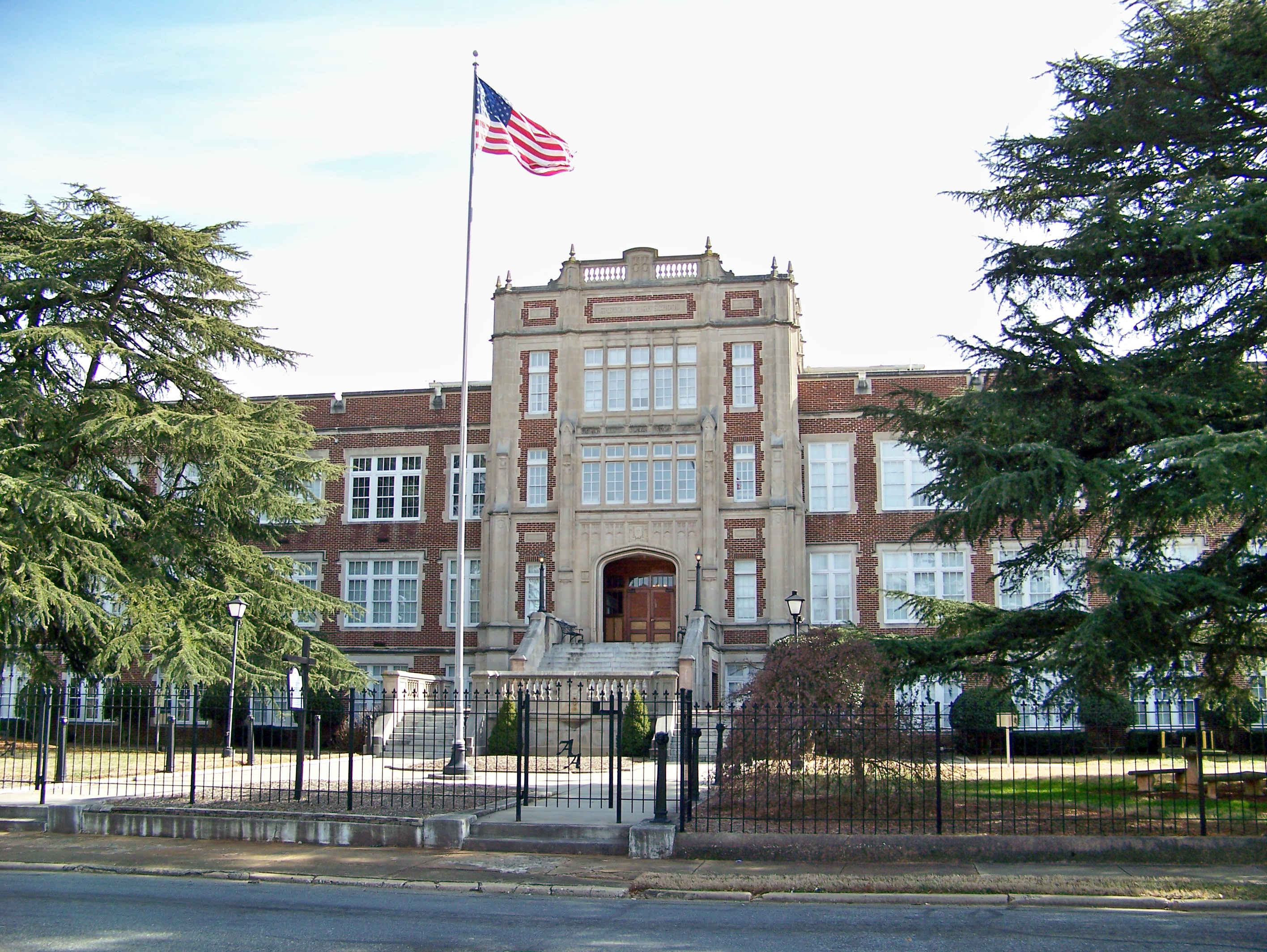
Former Gastonia High School Now Ashley Arms Apartments, 2014

York-Chester Historic District is a national historic district located at Gastonia, Gaston County, North Carolina, United States. It encompasses 649 contributing buildings, 2 contributing sites, and 1 contributing structure in a predominantly residential section of Gastonia. The dwellings were built between about 1856 and 1955, and include notable examples of Queen Anne and Bungalow / American Craftsman architecture. Located in the district are the separately listed former Gastonia High School. Other notable contributing resources include the Beal-Ragan Garden, Oakwood Cemetery, Caroline Hanna House (c. 1882), Spurrier Apartment building (c. 1929), Edgewood Apartments (c. 1937), the Joseph W. Lineberger House (c. 1947) and Devant J. and June S. Purvis House (1951).

It was listed on the National Register of Historic Places in 2005.
