= Lake Lure, North Carolina =

- Town
- Location within North Carolina Location within the United States
- Coordinates: 35°26′25″N 82°12′23″W
- Country: United States
- State: North Carolina
- County: Rutherford

Area
  - Total: 14.37 sq mi (37.22 km^{2})
  - Land: 13.17 sq mi (34.10 km^{2})
  - Water: 1.20 sq mi (3.12 km^{2})
- Elevation: 1,119 ft (341 m)

Population (2020)
  - Total: 1,365
  - Density: 103.7/sq mi (40.03/km^{2})
- Time zone: UTC-5 (Eastern (EST))
  - Summer (DST): UTC-4 (EDT)
- ZIP code: 28746
- Area code: 828
- FIPS code: 37-36500
- GNIS ID: 2405973
- Website: townoflakelure.com

Lake Lure is a town in Rutherford County, North Carolina, United States. In 2020 the town population was 1,365. Lake Lure was incorporated in 1927, and acquired the lake after which it is named in 1965.

== History ==
In 1902, Lucius B. Morse and his brothers Hiram and Asahel purchased 64 acres (0.26 km^{2}) around Chimney Rock (within present-day Chimney Rock State Park) for $5,000. They later acquired enough land in the area to bring the total to 8,000 acres (32 km^{2}). Lucius Morse's wife Elizabeth is credited with naming the lake (and the town). Included in the area that became the lake, according to a blog entry by Russ Meade, was the town of Buffalo, believed to have been named for a nearby mountain that resembled a buffalo.

In 1925, the Morse family created Carolina Mountain Power Company and funded the construction of a dam on the Broad River (through a mortgage) which produced the lake after which the town is named. The full impoundment of Lake Lure was completed in 1927. At ordinary water levels, Lake Lure covers approximately 720 acres (2.9 km^{2}) and has a shoreline of approximately 27 miles (43 km). The dam's power plant began operations in 1928 with the sale of electricity under a 10-year contract to Blue Ridge Power Co., a local predecessor of Duke Power. In modern times, the town continues to sell electricity to Duke Energy, although profits from the dam now come second to maintaining a fixed water level year-round.

In 1929, the plans for development came to a halt with the advent of the Great Depression. A mortgage-holder, Stroud & Company of Philadelphia, foreclosed on the lake and the dam. Stroud owned them and the power the dam generated until 1965. In 1963, the North Carolina General Assembly enacted the legislation that authorized the Town of Lake Lure to issue revenue bonds for the purpose of acquiring the assets from Stroud. The dam, power company, and real estate of Lake Lure were acquired by the Town of Lake Lure in 1965.

In 2010, Lake Lure formed its own charter school named Lake Lure Classical Academy, the only school in Lake Lure since Rutherford County shut down its school district in 1961.

On September 27, 2024, the town, along with the neighboring village of Chimney Rock, suffered catastrophic damage from flooding caused by Tropical Storm Helene, including the destruction of the historic Lake Lure Flowering Bridge and the attached Rainbow Bridge. The amount of rainfall from the storm prompted the issuance of a flash flood emergency by the National Weather Service and evacuation orders from local authorities due to water overtopping the dam and the risk of the structure failing. However, while the dam's structural supports had been damaged, its wall remained stable.

== Geography ==
According to the United States Census Bureau, the town has a total area of 14.8 square miles (38 km^{2}), of which, 13.6 square miles (35 km^{2}) of it is land and 1.2 square miles (3.1 km^{2}) of it (8.11%) is water.

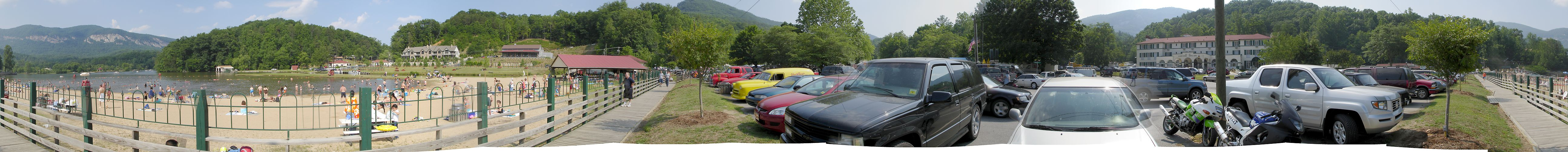
Panorama of Lake Lure

== Demographics ==
Historical population
| Census | Pop. | Note | %± |
|---|---|---|---|
| 1930 | 204 | | — |
| 1940 | 212 | | 3.9% |
| 1950 | 174 | | −17.9% |
| 1960 | 233 | | 33.9% |
| 1970 | 456 | | 95.7% |
| 1980 | 488 | | 7.0% |
| 1990 | 691 | | 41.6% |
| 2000 | 1,027 | | 48.6% |
| 2010 | 1,192 | | 16.1% |
| 2020 | 1,365 | | 14.5% |
U.S. Decennial Census

=== 2020 census ===
As of the 2020 United States census, there were 1,365 people, 745 households, and 504 families residing in the town.

Lake Lure racial composition
| Race | Number | Percentage |
|---|---|---|
| White (non-Hispanic) | 1,255 | 91.94% |
| Black or African American (non-Hispanic) | 8 | 0.59% |
| Asian | 9 | 0.66% |
| Other/Mixed | 45 | 3.3% |
| Hispanic or Latino | 48 | 3.52% |

=== 2000 census ===
As of the census of 2000, there were 1,027 people, 495 households, and 359 families residing in the town. The population density was 75.6 inhabitants per square mile (29.2/km^{2}). There were 1,957 housing units at an average density of 144.1 per square mile (55.6/km^{2}). The racial makeup of the town was 97.27% White, 1.46% African American, 0.29% Asian, 0.19% Native American, and 0.78% from two or more races. Hispanic or Latino of any race were 0.10% of the population.

There were 495 households, out of which 10.1% had children under the age of 18 living with them, 68.1% were married couples living together, 3.2% had a female householder with no husband present, and 27.3% were non-families. 22.4% of all households were made up of individuals, and 12.5% had someone living alone who was 65 years of age or older. The average household size was 2.07 and the average family size was 2.38.

In the town, the population was spread out, with 10.4% under the age of 18, 3.2% from 18 to 24, 14.1% from 25 to 44, 35.9% from 45 to 64, and 36.3% who were 65 years of age or older. The median age was 59 years. For every 100 females, there were 103.0 males. For every 100 females age 18 and over, there were 102.6 males.

The median income for a household in the town was $38,417, and the median income for a family was $45,833. Males had a median income of $39,464 versus $23,333 for females. The per capita income for the town was $23,459. About 4.9% of families and 10.2% of the population were below the poverty line, including 11.7% of those under age 18 and 4.9% of those age 65 or over.

== Tourism ==
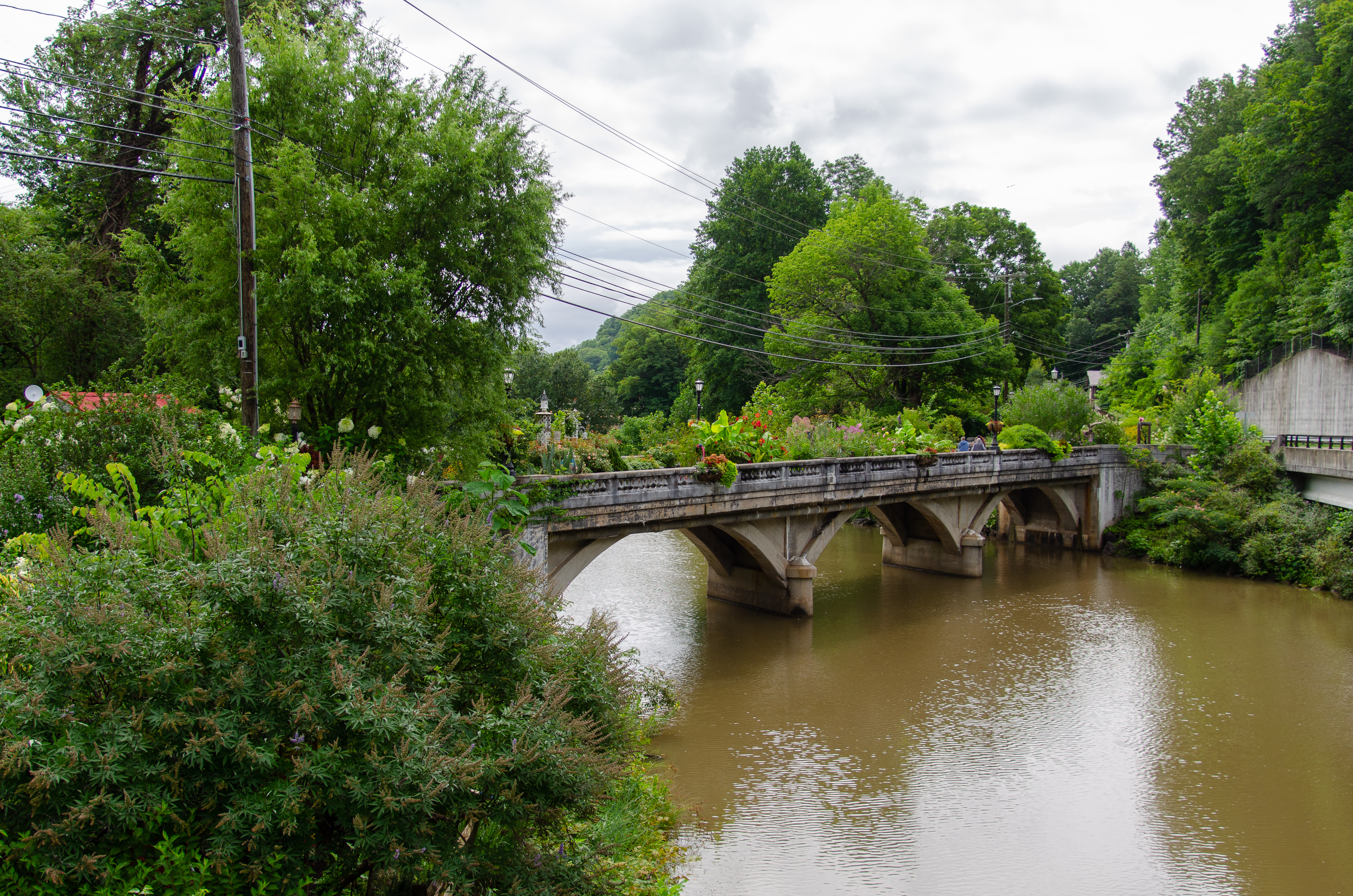
Lake Lure Flowering Bridge

Recreation and tourism have become crucial to the town's economy; challenges to this industry have included the Party Rock wildfire, the COVID-19 pandemic, and Hurricane Helene.

In 1999, Pine Gables was added to the National Register of Historic Places.

Lake Lure was a primary filming location for Dirty Dancing, and hosts an annual festival event honoring the movie.

Located on Memorial Highway, The Right Track Toy Train Museum, opened in 2011, features a large display of toy train memorabilia previously belonging to Larry Keyes. Larry's widow, Peggy, opened the museum to honor her late husband, and 100% of the museum's proceeds are donated to pancreatic cancer research.

The Rocky Broad River Bridge, built in 1925 and closed to traffic in 2011, re-opened as the Lake Lure Flowering Bridge in 2013, with gardens spanning the 155-foot (47 m) span of the bridge and expanding. Prior to the grand opening, the tourist attraction had already been visited by tourists from 36 states and 14 countries. Referred to as "The Gateway to Somewhere Beautiful", the Flowering Bridge featured garden beds, a mobile phone tour, a Sensory Tour for visually-impaired guests, and the Rainbow Bridge, which served as a memorial for the deceased pets of visitors. It had been recognized by the National Wildlife Federation as a Certified Wildlife Habitat and met the criteria to be designated as a Monarch Waystation by Monarch Watch. The bridge was briefly closed in 2020 due to the COVID-19 pandemic. On September 27, 2024, the bridge was severely damaged and the gardens mostly destroyed due to flooding caused by Tropical Storm Helene; as of December 2024, clean-up and assessment are in progress.

=== Rumbling Bald ===
Rumbling Bald is located by the lake and on the foothills of the Blue Ridge Mountains. People may visit the resort for a relaxation retreat, for adventure (including hiking, fishing, paddle and floating), or for golfing. Many golf tournaments and championships have taken place at the Apple Valley Golf Course, which was designed by Dan Maples, son of golf course architect Ellis Maples.

== Filming location ==
The Lake Lure area has been used several times as a filming location, beginning with Thunder Road (1958). Other movies that include scenes filmed in or near Lake Lure are: A Breed Apart (1984), Firestarter (1984), Dirty Dancing (1987), My Fellow Americans (1996), and Careful What You Wish For (2015). Scenes in the film The Last of the Mohicans (1992), including the final 17 minutes, were filmed at nearby Chimney Rock and Hickory Nut Gorge.

== Notable people ==
- Verda Welcome – Maryland educator and politician, was born in Lake Lure
