= Washburn Historic District =

Historic district in North Carolina, United States

- U.S. National Register of Historic Places
- U.S. Historic district
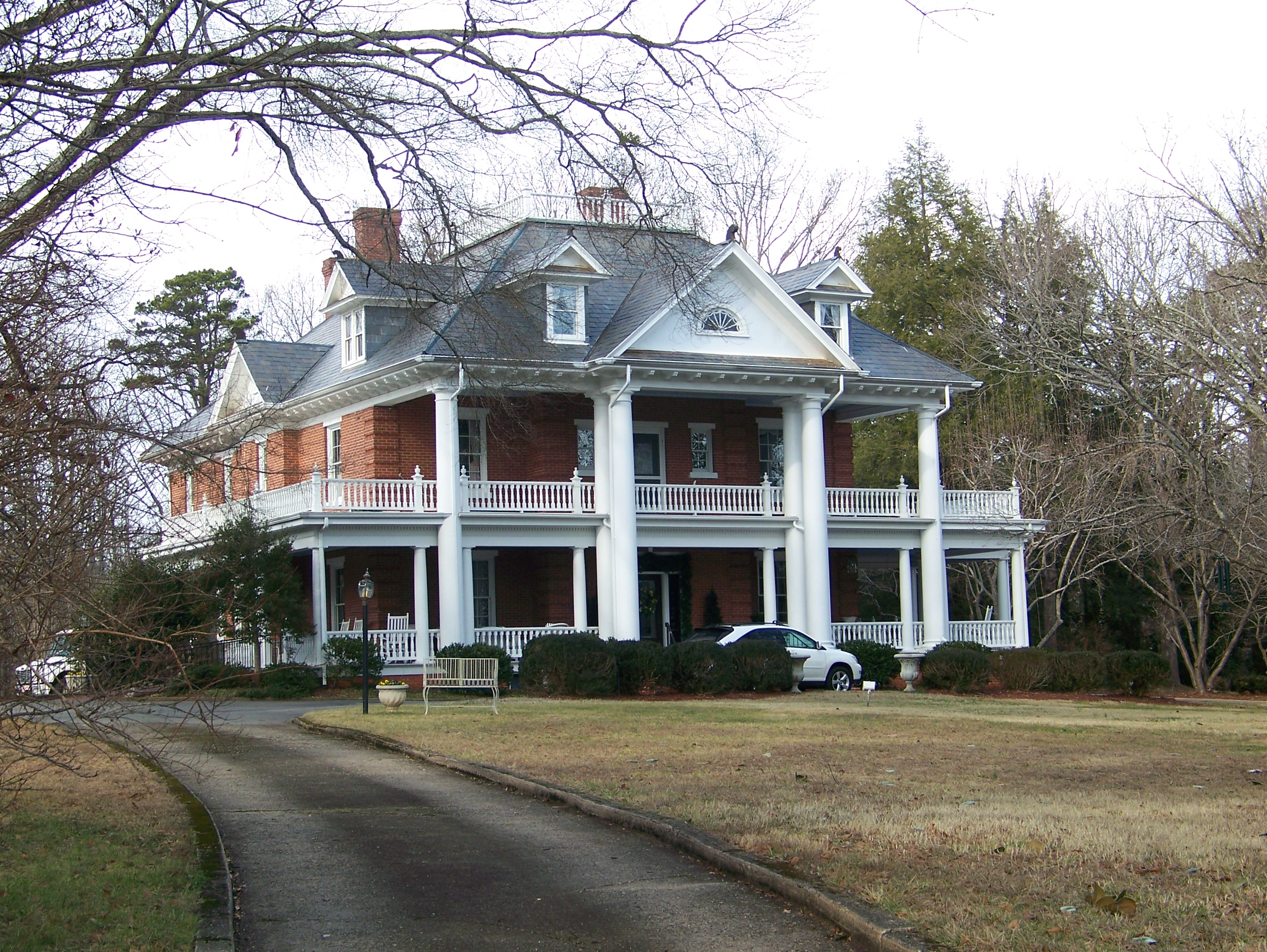
- Washburn House, January 2013

- Location within North Carolina Location within the United States
- Location: 2401, 2426, and 2436 Bostic-Sunshine Highway, 1391 and 1392 Andrews Mill Rd., 126-156 and 157 Salem Church Rd.; also 1037 Gun Club Rd., near Bostic, North Carolina
- Coordinates: 35°23′42″N 81°48′59″W
- Area: 65.2 acres (26.4 ha)
- Built: 1915
- Architectural style: Classical Revival, Period cottage
- NRHP reference No.: 02000056, 05001552 (Boundary Increase)
- Added to NRHP: February 20, 2002, January 25, 2006 (Boundary Increase)

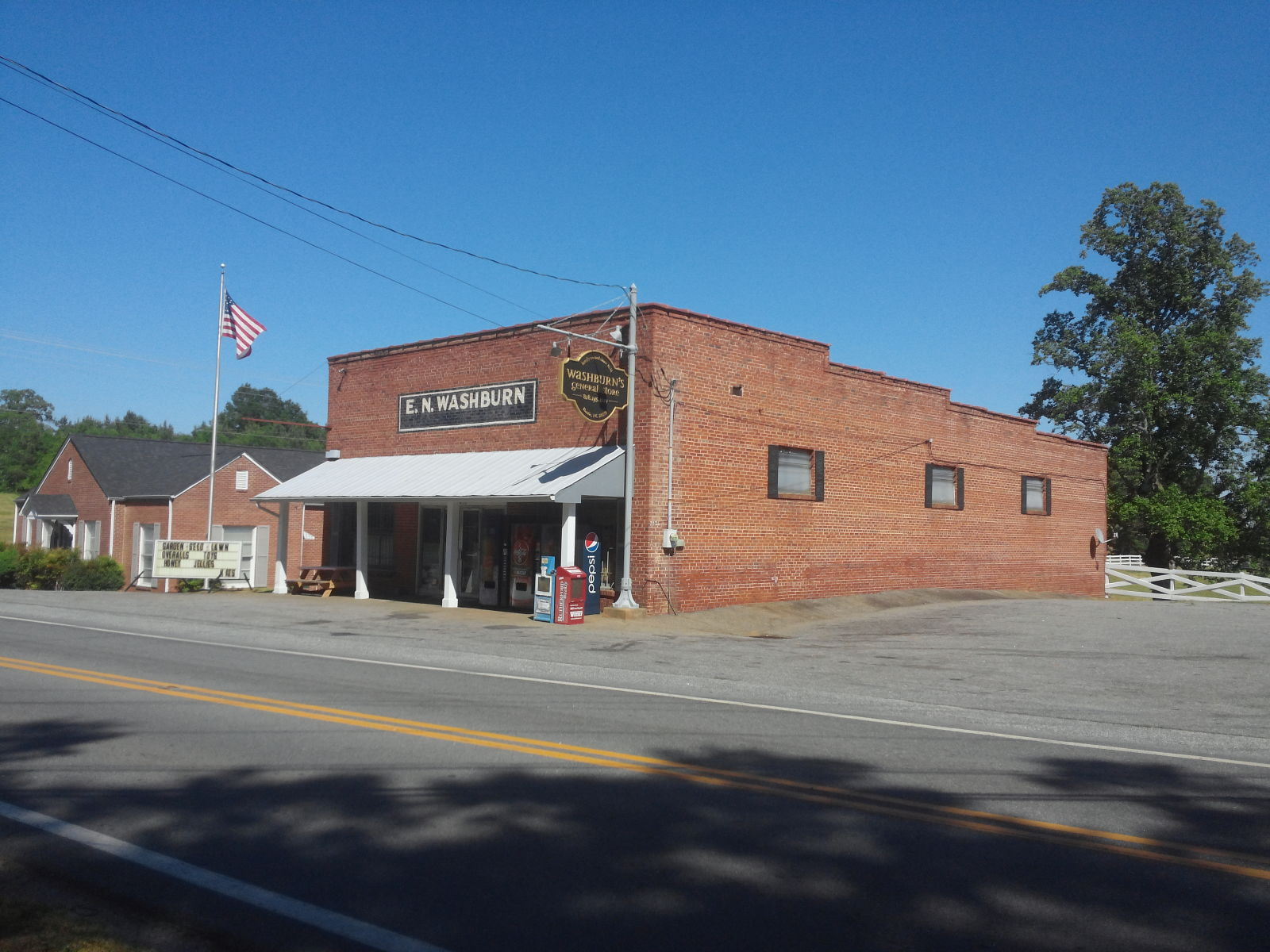
E.N. Washburn Store, 2013

Washburn Historic District is a national historic district located near Bostic, Rutherford County, North Carolina. It encompasses 17 contributing buildings and 1 contributing structure in the crossroads community of Washburn. It developed after 1915, and includes notable examples of Classical Revival style architecture. The principal historic buildings in the district are the Edgar Nollie Washburn House, two rental dwellings, a barn, the Washburn store, the Washburn Funeral Home, and Washburn-Davis House.

It was added to the National Register of Historic Places in 2002, with a boundary increase in 2006.
