= Melton–Fortune Farmstead =

Historic farm in North Carolina, United States

- U.S. National Register of Historic Places
- Location within North Carolina Location within the United States
- Location: SR 1006 south of NC 226, near Golden Valley, North Carolina
- Coordinates: 35°30′34″N 81°45′52″W
- Area: 140 acres (57 ha)
- Built: 1796
- Architectural style: Federal, Vernacular Federal
- NRHP reference No.: 85001553
- Added to NRHP: July 11, 1985

Melton–Fortune Farmstead is a historic home and farm located near Golden Valley, Rutherford County, North Carolina. The oldest section of the house was built about 1796, and is a rectangular, hall-and-parlor plan, log structure that forms two rooms of the central core. The house is a 1 1/2-story, weatherboarded structure with an engaged porch and Federal style design elements. Also on the property are the contributing log barn, threshing machine, and archaeological sites.

It was added to the National Register of Historic Places in 1985.
