= Trinity Lutheran Church (Rutherfordton, North Carolina) =

Historic church in North Carolina, United States

- U.S. National Register of Historic Places
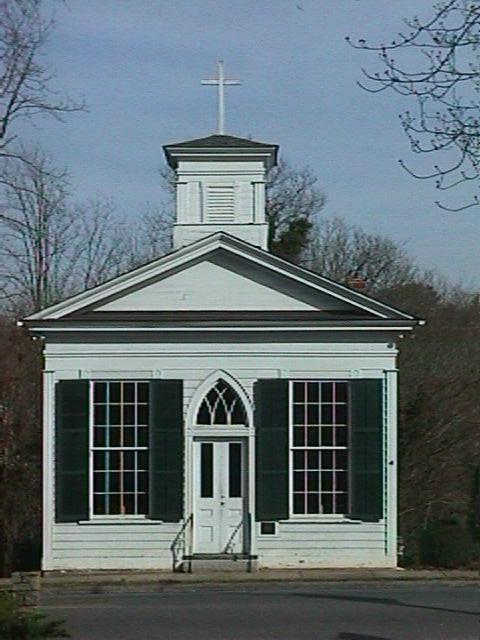
- Trinity Lutheran Church, March 2003

- Location within North Carolina Location within the United States
- Location: 702 N. Main St., Rutherfordton, North Carolina
- Coordinates: 35°22′21″N 81°57′19″W
- Area: 0.3 acres (0.12 ha)
- Architectural style: Greek Revival
- NRHP reference No.: 72000997
- Added to NRHP: March 24, 1972

Trinity Lutheran Church, previously known as St. John's Episcopal Church, is a historic church at 702 N. Main Street in Rutherfordton, Rutherford County, North Carolina.

The Greek Revival-style church building was constructed in 1846 for the parish of St. John's Episcopal Church and remained an Episcopal church until 1936, when it was purchased by the Lutheran Synod and became Trinity Lutheran Church. The building was added to the National Register of Historic Places in 1972. The building suffered a damaging fire in 2011 and is currently closed.
