= Bostic Charge Parsonage =

Historic house in North Carolina, United States

- U.S. National Register of Historic Places
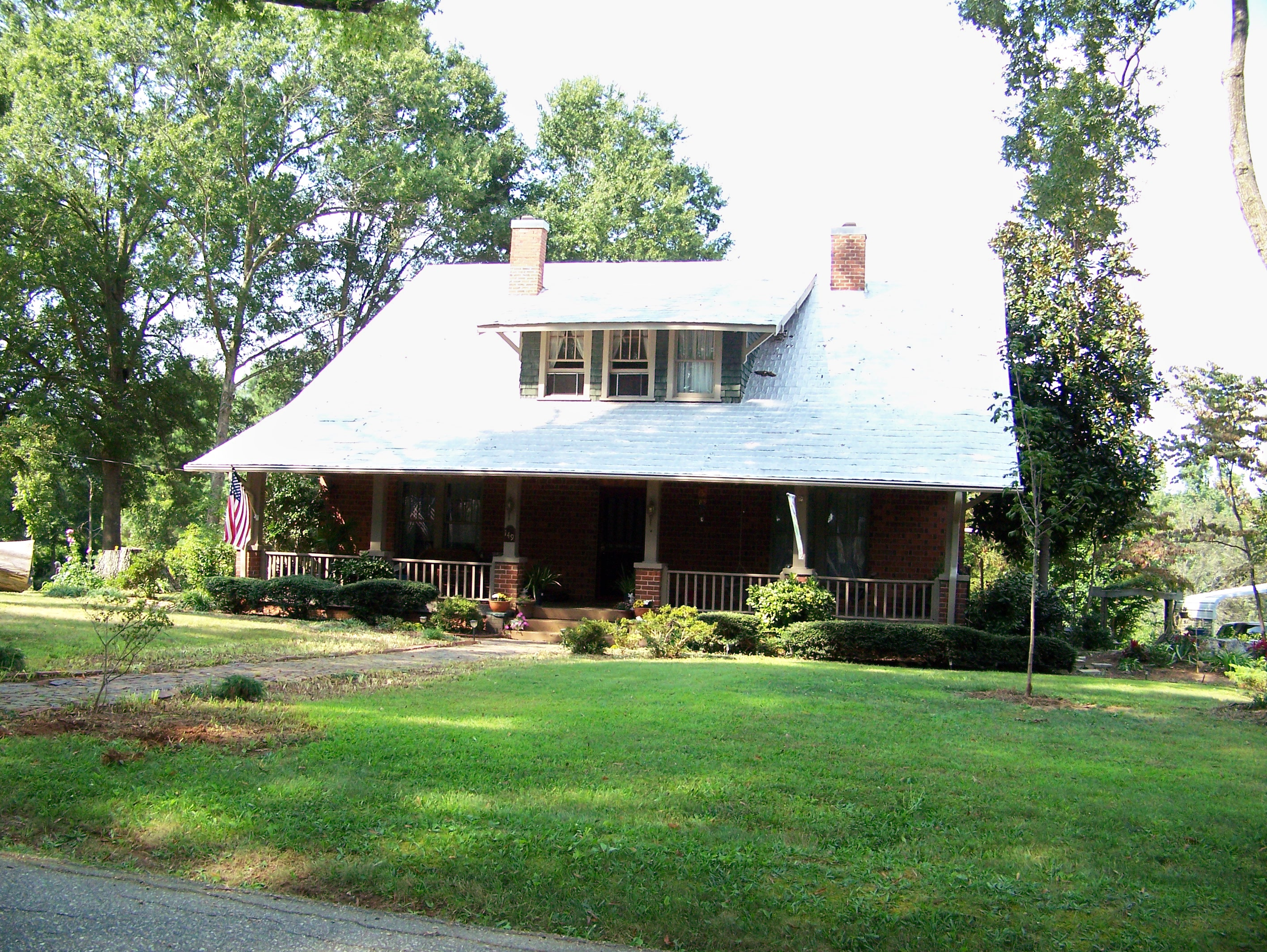
- Bostic Charge Parsonage, September 2013

- Location within North Carolina Location within the United States
- Location: 149 Old Sunshine Rd., Bostic, North Carolina
- Coordinates: 35°21′54″N 81°50′03″W
- Area: .98 acres (0.40 ha)
- Built: c. 1922
- Built by: Baber, B. Craven, and Baber, S. Marvin
- Architectural style: Bungalow/Craftsman
- NRHP reference No.: 12000580
- Added to NRHP: August 28, 2012

Bostic Charge Parsonage is a historic home located at Bostic, Rutherford County, North Carolina. It was built in 1922, and is a 1 1/2-story, three-bay, Bungalow / American Craftsman-style brick and frame dwelling. It features a side-gabled roof, center shed dormer, and full-width front porch. It was built as a parsonage for a minister serving five local Methodist churches.

It was added to the National Register of Historic Places in 2012.
