= William Chivous Bostic Sr. =

- Medical career
- Profession: Physician
- Sub-specialties: Internal disease and pediatrics

Dr. William Chivous Bostic, Sr. (December 20, 1877 – September 23, 1957), was a prominent American doctor.

== Early life and education ==
Bostic was the son of George T. Bostic, after whom the town of Bostic in Rutherford County was named, and Margaret Jane Bostic (née Goode). When William Bostic was just 14 years old, an outbreak of measles struck the town of Bostic. He assisted Dr. Guilford E. Young in caring for the affected patients, and became known to the residents as "Doc".

Bostic attended public schools in Bostic before going to Rutherford College, where he completed his literary course in 1896. His father experienced financial difficulties later in life, and Bostic worked as a custodian to support himself while he attended Grant University in Chattanooga, Tennessee. He graduated from Grant in 1899, and received a medical degree from North Carolina Medical College in 1905, having studied pediatrics and internal diseases. Bostic received additional training at the Mayo Clinic, where he had life membership of the Mayo Surgeon's Club.

== Medical career and later life ==
Bostic briefly practiced medicine in Polk County, North Carolina before joining the practice of Dr. Young in Forest City, North Carolina. He authored numerous publications on medical science, including widely circulated recommendations on the improvement of rural medical care and research on jaundice, influenza and pellagra.

In Forest City, Bostic helped to found the Alexander Home for Motherless Children and was a county physician as well as a company surgeon for various companies.

In 1900, Bostic married Mossie Arledge with whom he had four children: Margaret, William Chivous Jr., Dorothy, and Kenneth. William Chivous Bostic Jr. became an accomplished physician like his father, and graduated from the University of Pennsylvania with honors in 1926.
