= Melton-Davis House =

Historic house in North Carolina, United States

- U.S. National Register of Historic Places
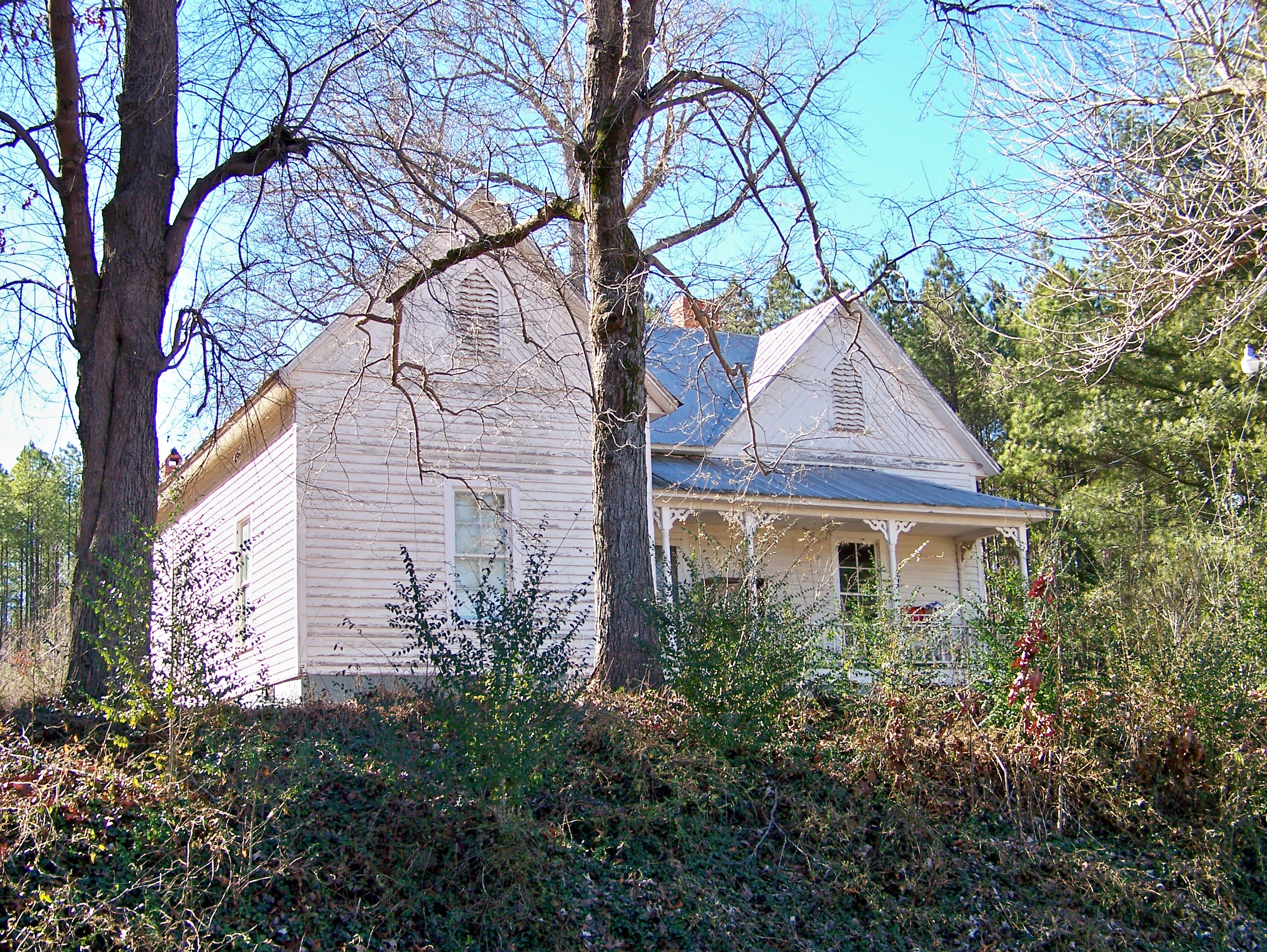
- Melton-Davis House, February 2014

- Location within North Carolina Location within the United States
- Location: 477 DePriest Rd., near Bostic, North Carolina
- Coordinates: 35°25′57″N 81°48′52″W
- Area: 2.1 acres (0.85 ha)
- Built: c. 1904
- Architectural style: Queen Anne
- NRHP reference No.: 08000813
- Added to NRHP: August 29, 2008

Melton-Davis House, also known as the Cannie Melton House, is a historic home located near Bostic, Rutherford County, North Carolina. It was built about 1904, and is a one-story, weatherboarded, Queen Anne-style frame dwelling. It sits on a concrete block foundation and consists of two main gable-front, double-pile blocks that flank the center hall, and its ornamental finish. Also on the property is a contributing barn, built between about 1904 and 1915.

It was added to the National Register of Historic Places in 2008.
