= Gilbert Town Historic District =

Historic district in North Carolina, United States

- U.S. National Register of Historic Places
- U.S. Historic district
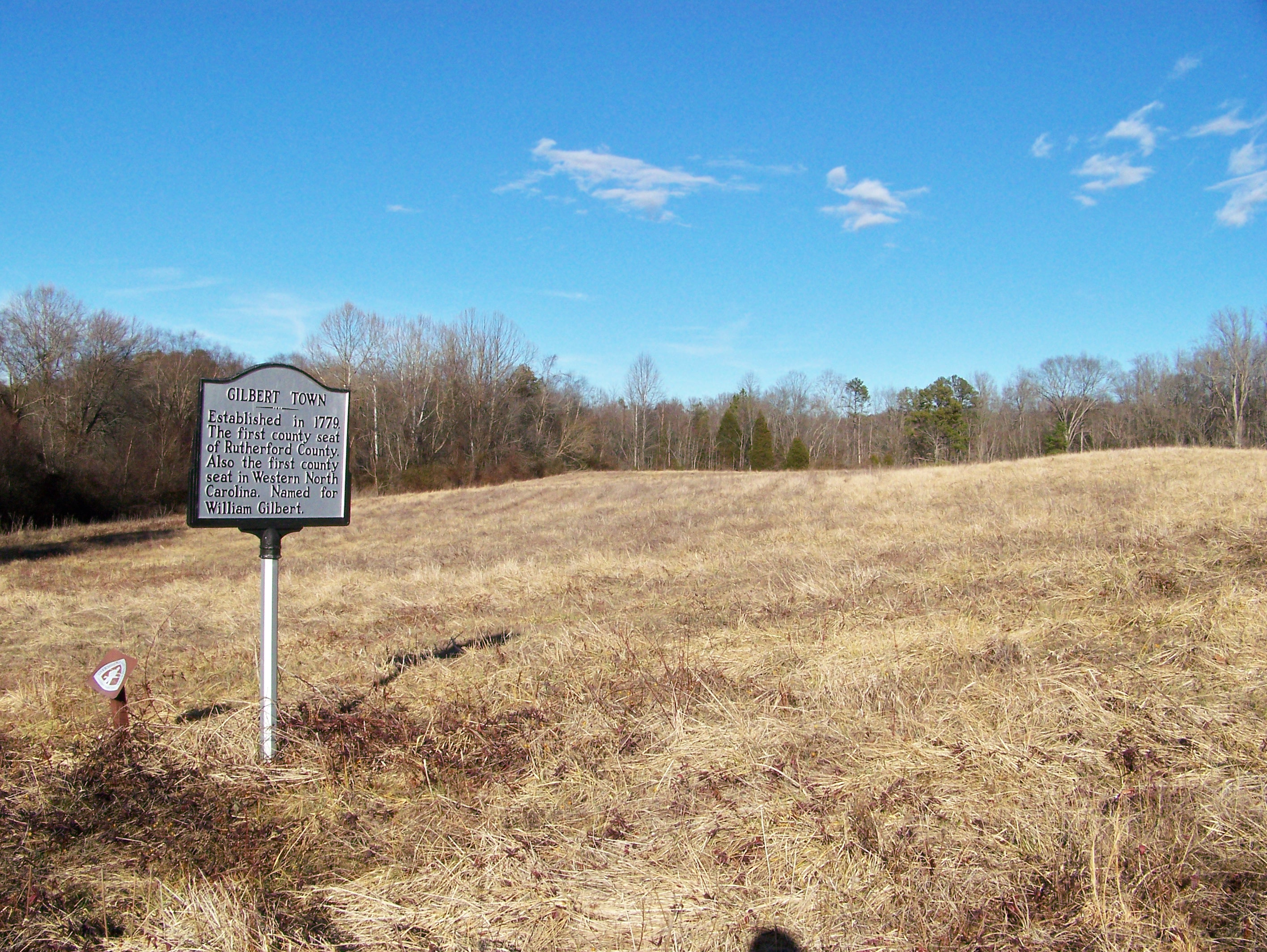
- Gilbert Town Site, February 2014

- Location within North Carolina Location within the United States
- Location: Along sections of Rock Rd. (NC 1520) and Old Gilbert Town Rd. (NC 1539), near Rutherfordton, North Carolina
- Coordinates: 35°24′25″N 81°56′37″W
- Area: 459.5 acres (186.0 ha)
- Built: 1780
- NRHP reference No.: 06000726
- Added to NRHP: August 23, 2006

Gilbert Town Historic District is an archaeological site listed in the National Register of Historic Places located in Rutherfordton, Rutherford County, North Carolina. From 1776 to 1783, Gilbert Town was an important trading center and served as a camp for both Patriot and Loyalist forces during the American Revolutionary War. Gilbert Town included the William Gilbert House, a store, tavern, mill, and blacksmith shop. Gilbert Town was also the site of the Rutherford County Courthouse from 1781 to 1783. The sites are located along the approximate location of Rock Road on the Overmountain Victory National Historic Trail.

It was added to the National Register of Historic Places in February 2006.

== See also ==
- History's Hidden Landscapes: Gilbert Town Historic District
