= Rutherfordton, North Carolina =

- Town
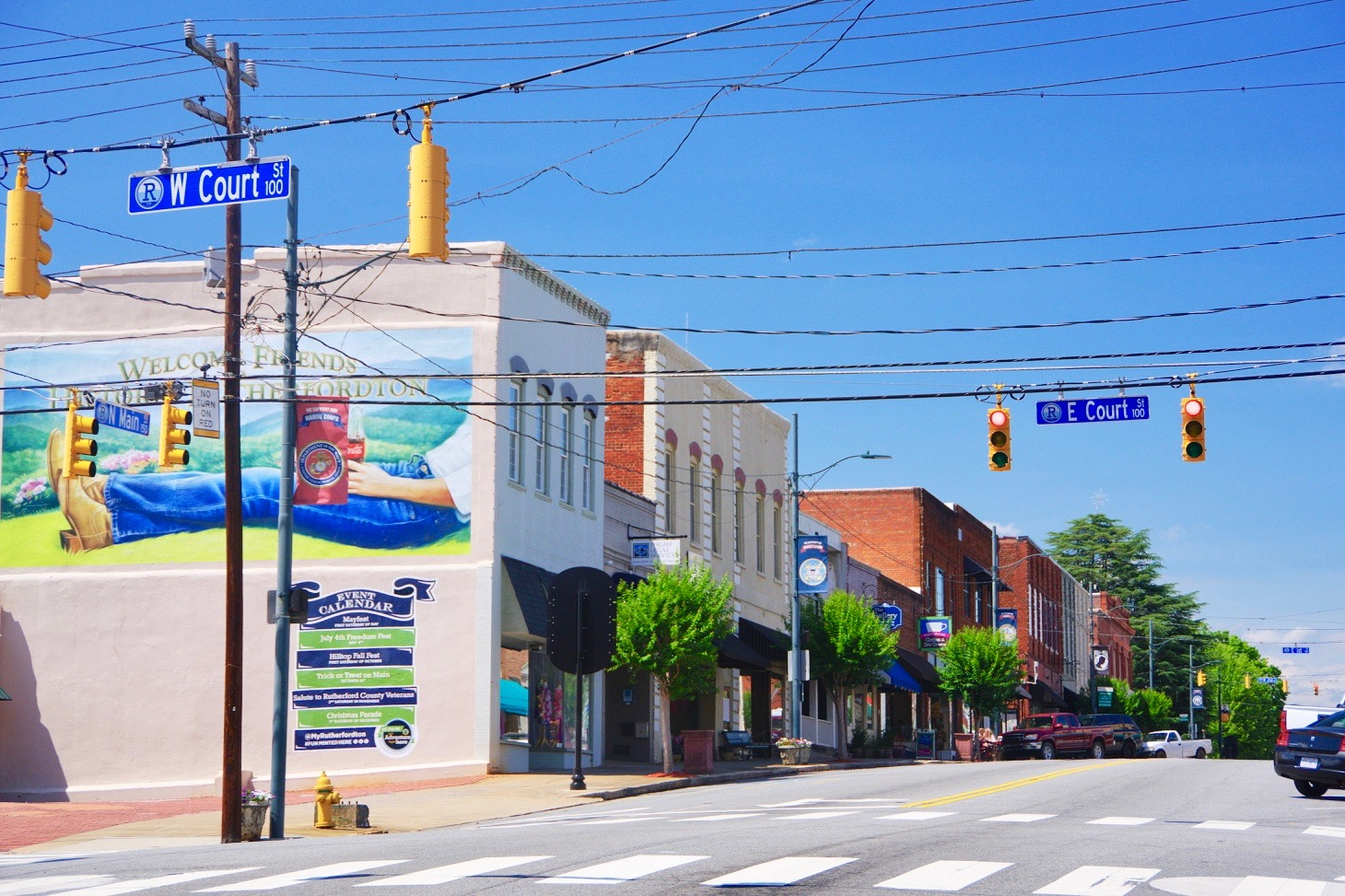
- Main Street (US 221)

- Seal
- Motto: "A Minted Original"
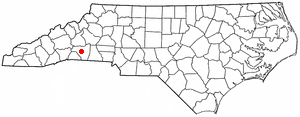
- Location of Rutherfordton, North Carolina
- Coordinates: 35°21′51″N 81°57′41″W
- Country: United States
- State: North Carolina
- County: Rutherford
- Established: 1787
- Named for: Griffith Rutherford

Area
  - Total: 4.14 sq mi (10.73 km^{2})
  - Land: 4.14 sq mi (10.73 km^{2})
  - Water: 0 sq mi (0.00 km^{2})
- Elevation: 915 ft (279 m)

Population (2020)
  - Total: 3,640
  - Density: 878.6/sq mi (339.23/km^{2})
- Time zone: UTC-5 (Eastern (EST))
  - Summer (DST): UTC-4 (EDT)
- ZIP code: 28139
- Area code: 828
- FIPS code: 37-58460
- GNIS feature ID: 2407262
- Website: www.rutherfordton.net

Rutherfordton is a town in and the county seat of Rutherford County, North Carolina, United States. The population was 3,640 at the 2020 census.

== History ==
The town of Rutherfordton was founded in 1787 to serve as the new seat of Rutherford County, taking over from Gilbert Town. Its foundation was planned by a committee appointed by the General Assembly of North Carolina. The committee purchased 50 acres of land on Cleghorn Creek from landowner James Adair. The plots included a hill safe from flooding, making it a perfect site for building the town courthouse. By 1791, the main streets of Rutherfordton had been laid out on a grid plan. Next was the construction of the U.S. Post Office in 1798, and the establishment of the Rutherfordton Academy in 1806.

Rutherfordton was at the center of the flourishing North Carolina gold industry between 1790 and 1840. During that period, 70% of the American gold supply came from western North Carolina. German-born goldsmith Christopher Bechtler minted the first U.S. gold dollars in Rutherfordton.

== Geography ==
Rutherfordton is concentrated around the intersection of U.S. Route 221 and North Carolina Highway 108. The town of Ruth borders Rutherfordton to the north, and the town of Spindale borders Rutherfordton to the east.

According to the United States Census Bureau, the town has a total area of 4.2 square miles (10.8 km^{2}), all land.

== Demographics ==
Historical population
Census	Pop.	Note	%±
1850	484		—
1870	479		—
1880	300		−37.4%
1900	880		—
1910	1,062		20.7%
1920	1,693		59.4%
1930	2,020		19.3%
1940	2,326		15.1%
1950	3,146		35.3%
1960	3,392		7.8%
1970	3,245		−4.3%
1980	3,434		5.8%
1990	3,617		5.3%
2000	4,131		14.2%
2010	4,213		2.0%
2020	3,640		−13.6%
U.S. Decennial Census

=== 2020 census ===
As of the 2020 census, Rutherfordton had a population of 3,640. The median age was 47.1 years. 17.9% of residents were under the age of 18 and 23.7% of residents were 65 years of age or older. For every 100 females, there were 92.1 males, and for every 100 females age 18 and over, there were 89.5 males age 18 and over.

96.4% of residents lived in urban areas, while 3.6% lived in rural areas.

There were 1,586 households in Rutherfordton, of which 25.0% had children under the age of 18 living in them. Of all households, 42.5% were married-couple households, 17.7% were households with a male householder and no spouse or partner present, and 34.1% were households with a female householder and no spouse or partner present. About 36.2% of all households were made up of individuals, and 19.3% had someone living alone who was 65 years of age or older. As of the 2020 census, there were 893 families residing in the town.

There were 1,816 housing units, of which 12.7% were vacant. The homeowner vacancy rate was 2.3% and the rental vacancy rate was 7.4%.

Rutherfordton racial composition
Race	Number	Percentage
White (non-Hispanic)	2,853	78.38%
Black or African American (non-Hispanic)	352	9.67%
Native American	12	0.33%
Asian	52	1.43%
Pacific Islander	1	0.03%
Other/Mixed	176	4.84%
Hispanic or Latino	194	5.33%

=== 2000 census ===
As of the census of 2000, there were 4,131 people, 1,602 households, and 1,047 families residing in the town. The population density was 990.1 inhabitants per square mile (382.3/km^{2}). There were 1,765 housing units at an average density of 423.0 per square mile (163.3/km^{2}). The racial makeup of the town was 84.17% White, 13.60% African American, 0.12% Native American, 0.73% Asian, 0.73% from other races, and 0.65% from two or more races. Hispanic or Latino of any race were 1.28% of the population.

There were 1,602 households, out of which 30.0% had children under the age of 18 living with them, 48.9% were married couples living together, 13.2% had a female householder with no husband present, and 34.6% were non-families. 31.5% of all households were made up of individuals, and 16.1% had someone living alone who was 65 years of age or older. The average household size was 2.33 and the average family size was 2.91.

In the town, the population was spread out, with 22.6% under the age of 18, 6.9% from 18 to 24, 28.0% from 25 to 44, 22.0% from 45 to 64, and 20.5% who were 65 years of age or older. The median age was 40 years. For every 100 females, there were 89.4 males. For every 100 females age 18 and over, there were 85.5 males.

The median income for a household in the town was $37,941, and the median income for a family was $47,381. Males had a median income of $34,592 versus $23,371 for females. The per capita income for the town was $21,742. About 8.8% of families and 10.8% of the population were below the poverty line, including 15.4% of those under age 18 and 12.6% of those age 65 or over.

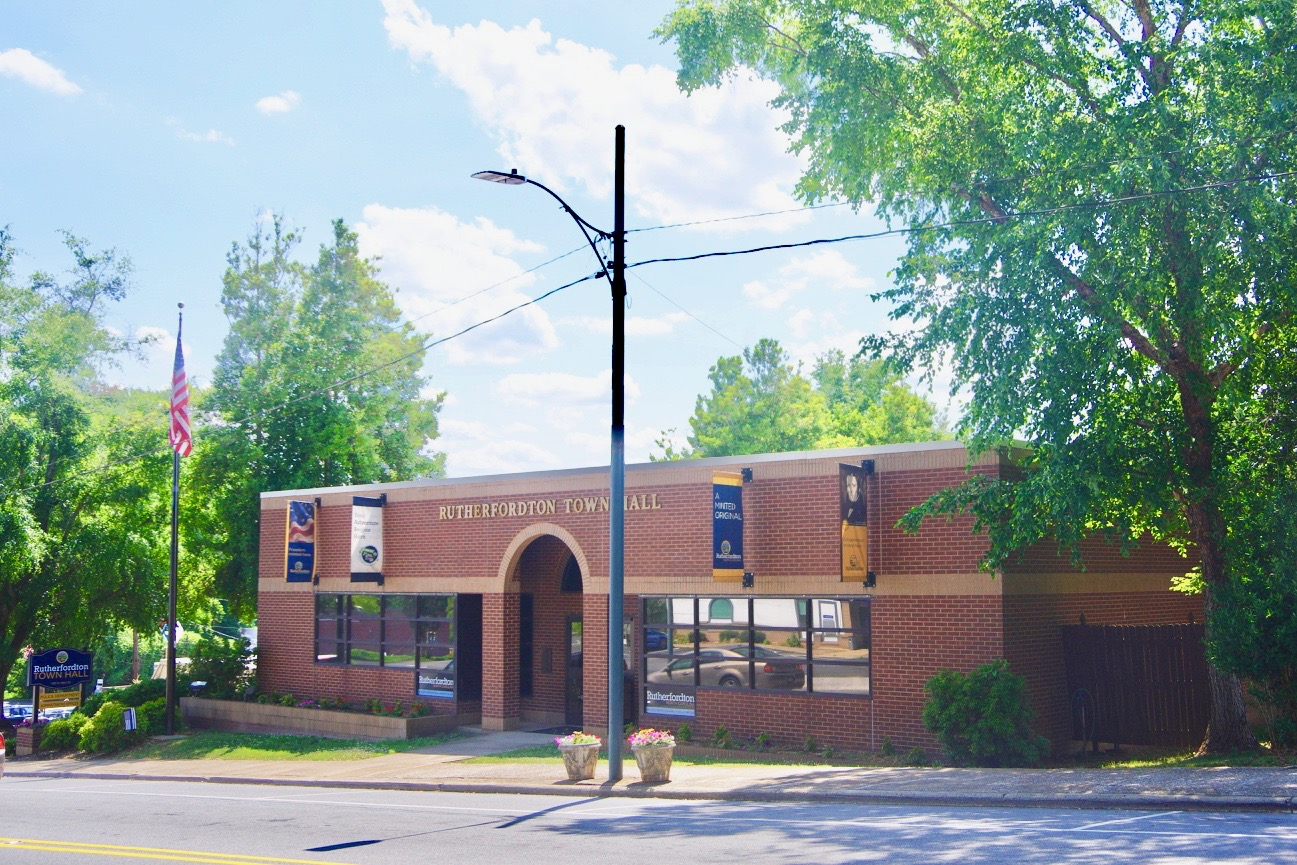
Town hall

== Arts and culture ==
Sites listed on the National Register of Historic Places including: the Bechtler Mint Site, Carrier Houses, Fox Haven Plantation, Gilbert Town Historic District, George W. Logan House, Main Street Historic District, Rutherford County Courthouse, Rutherfordton-Spindale Central High School, St. Luke's Chapel, and Trinity Lutheran Church.

== Notable people ==
- Michael Johnston, actor
- Betsy Brantley, actress
- William T. Carpenter, psychiatrist who served as an expert witness in the trial of John W. Hinckley
- Walter Dalton, lieutenant governor of North Carolina
- Bruce Davis, National Football League offensive tackle
- Gomer Hodge, Major League Baseball player, coach, and manager
- Sherry Hursey, actress
- Woodrow W. Jones, U.S. representative from North Carolina
- Tom Wright, Major League Baseball outfielder
