= Fox Haven Plantation =

Historic house in North Carolina, United States

- U.S. National Register of Historic Places
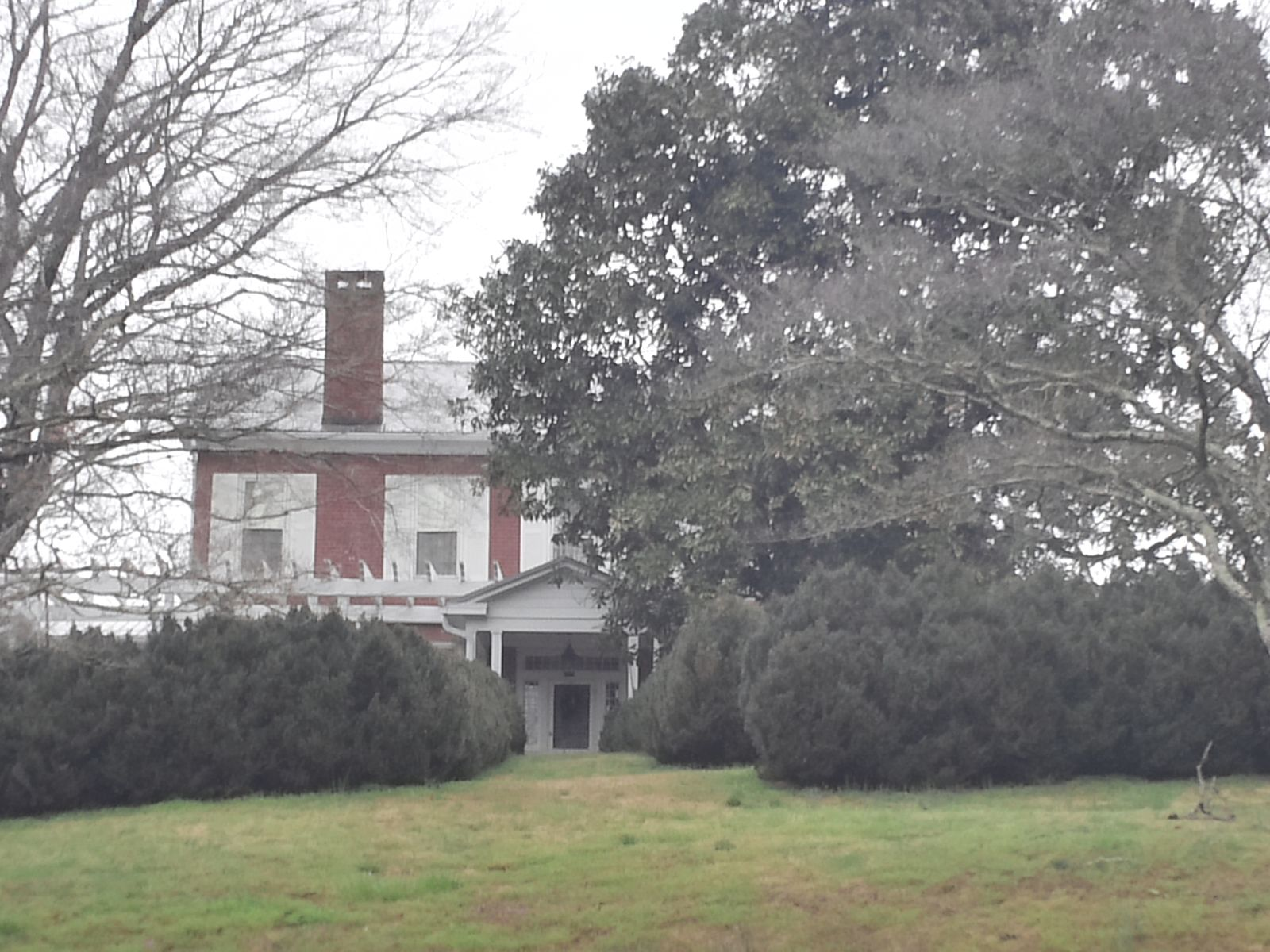
- Fox Haven Plantation, March 2015

- Location within North Carolina Location within the United States
- Location: Southwest of Rutherfordton off SR 1157, near Rutherfordton, North Carolina
- Coordinates: 35°20′53″N 82°3′13″W
- Area: 9 acres (3.6 ha)
- Built: 1823
- Architectural style: Federal
- NRHP reference No.: 72000996
- Added to NRHP: September 14, 1972

Fox Haven Plantation is a historic plantation house located in Green Hill Township near Rutherfordton, Rutherford County, North Carolina. It was built in 1823, and is a two-story, five bay by three bay, brick dwelling with Federal-style design elements. It sits on a low brick foundation and has two interior chimneys on the rear facade and one on the front facade. The building had three entrances when originally built, but at a later date, one of the entrances was redone to be a window. The attic of the house is unfinished.

It was added to the National Register of Historic Places in 1972.

During the time in which it was nominated to be added to the National Register of Historic Places, Ben Summers and his wife owned the property.

== Significance ==
John Morris patented 185 acres in what is now Rutherford County in 1769. This was perhaps his first grant in what was then known as Tryon County. To this land he added 250 acres in 1771 and an additional 200 in 1774, his homestead then amounting to 635 acres. The story is told that Morris's home place on this land was called Fox Haven (also the name of the present dwelling) because of a service rendered by an Indian to the early settler. The Indian, who called himself "Fox," gave warning of a planned raid on the area and thereafter had to take refuge on Morris's plantation which then came to be called Fox Haven.

John Morris was active in the early phase of the American Revolution and was elected by the freeholders of the county to the Tryon County Committee of Safety in 1775. In the same year, he was present at the meeting of the committee when it resolved to subscribe to an association against "the tools of ministerial vengeance and despotism for the subjugating of all British America ...... " John Morris is said to have died in 1783, leaving the plantation to his son, James Morris, also a soldier in the American Revolution.

According to family tradition, James Morris built the present brick house in 1823 and used the plantation as a horse farm. In his will of 1855 he left "the home plantation, with the mansion in which I now live .. .. containing six hundred and thirty-six acres more or less" to his son, James B. Morris. The estate also included twenty-eight slaves. Fox Haven remained in the Morris family until it was sold in 1941 to W. S. Green. The present owners, Mr. and Mrs. Benjamin H. Sumner, bought the property, now 432 acres, in 1948.

Because of its unusual plan and chimney placement, Fox Haven is one of the more interesting examples of the two-story brick houses constructed in western North Carolina in the early nineteenth century. The house, which is in excellent condition, is distinguished by the well-executed Federal details of its entrance and lunettes.
