= Bostic, North Carolina =

- Town
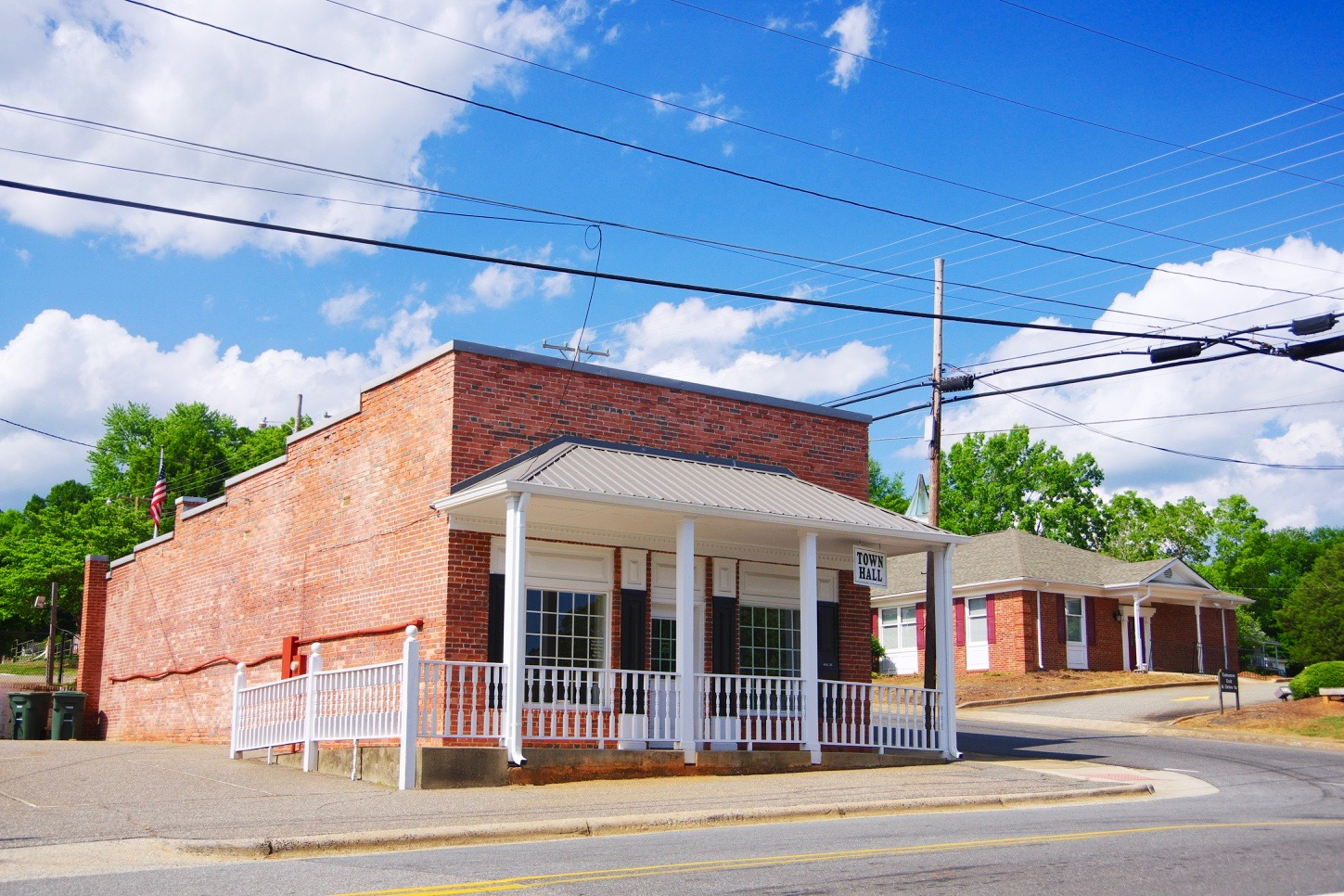
- Town hall

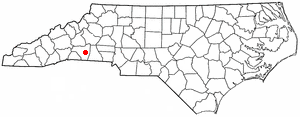
- Location of Bostic, North Carolina
- Coordinates: 35°21′45″N 81°50′10″W
- Country: United States
- State: North Carolina
- County: Rutherford

Area
  - Total: 0.93 sq mi (2.42 km^{2})
  - Land: 0.93 sq mi (2.42 km^{2})
  - Water: 0 sq mi (0.00 km^{2})
- Elevation: 915 ft (279 m)

Population (2020)
  - Total: 355
  - Density: 380.7/sq mi (146.97/km^{2})
- Time zone: UTC-5 (Eastern (EST))
  - Summer (DST): UTC-4 (EDT)
- ZIP code: 28018
- Area code: 828
- FIPS code: 37-07220
- GNIS feature ID: 2405305
- Website: https://townofbostic.com

Bostic is a town in Rutherford County, North Carolina, United States. The population was 355 at the 2020 census.

== History ==
The area was originally named Black Oak, before being named Bostick and eventually Bostic. It was named after George T. Bostic, a prominent businessman and member of the community. His son, William Chivous Bostic Sr., became an accomplished doctor and researcher of infectious disease.

In 1904, George W. Jones founded the Valdesian Nurseries in Bostic. The nurseries were originally situated on two acres but had expanded to two hundred acres in less than twenty years. The nursery primarily produced ornamental and rare plants for wholesale. The grounds included space for offices, storage, and greenhouses. It was located adjacent to the railroad.

The Bostic Charge Parsonage, Melton-Davis House, and Washburn Historic District are listed on the National Register of Historic Places.

== Geography ==
According to the United States Census Bureau, the town has a total area of 0.9 square miles (2.3 km^{2}), all land.

== Demographics ==
Historical population
Census	Pop.	Note	%±
1900	97		—
1910	209		115.5%
1920	206		−1.4%
1930	238		15.5%
1940	226		−5.0%
1950	227		0.4%
1960	274		20.7%
1970	289		5.5%
1980	476		64.7%
1990	371		−22.1%
2000	328		−11.6%
2010	386		17.7%
2020	355		−8.0%
U.S. Decennial Census

As of the census of 2000, there were 328 people, 136 households, and 93 families residing in the town. The population density was 377.6 inhabitants per square mile (145.8/km^{2}). There were 153 housing units at an average density of 176.2 per square mile (68.0/km^{2}). The racial makeup of the town was 92.99% White, 4.27% African American, 1.22% Asian, 0.30% from other races, and 1.22% from two or more races. Hispanic or Latino of any race were 0.30% of the population.

There were 136 households, out of which 35.3% had children under the age of 18 living with them, 52.9% were married couples living together, 11.0% had a female householder with no husband present, and 30.9% were non-families. 27.2% of all households were made up of individuals, and 13.2% had someone living alone who was 65 years of age or older. The average household size was 2.41 and the average family size was 2.95.

In the town, the age distribution of the population shows 27.1% under the age of 18, 9.1% from 18 to 24, 25.0% from 25 to 44, 24.4% from 45 to 64, and 14.3% who were 65 years of age or older. The median age was 36 years. For every 100 females, there were 88.5 males. For every 100 females age 18 and over, there were 86.7 males.

The median income for a household in the town was $28,125, and the median income for a family was $38,750. Males had a median income of $29,375 versus $20,455 for females. The per capita income for the town was $15,454. None of the families and 4.5% of the population were living below the poverty line, including no under eighteens and 14.0% of those over 64.

== Abraham Lincoln ==
Some believe that Abraham Lincoln was born on Puzzle Creek near Bostic. The Bostic Lincoln Center points to historians and Lincoln biographers that put Lincoln's birth 5 years earlier than is commonly accepted. These histories have him born to his mother Nancy Hanks and took the name Lincoln only after Hanks moved to Kentucky with the then infant Abraham. Richard Martin and 15 other men have been named as Abraham Lincoln's father.

== Rail ==
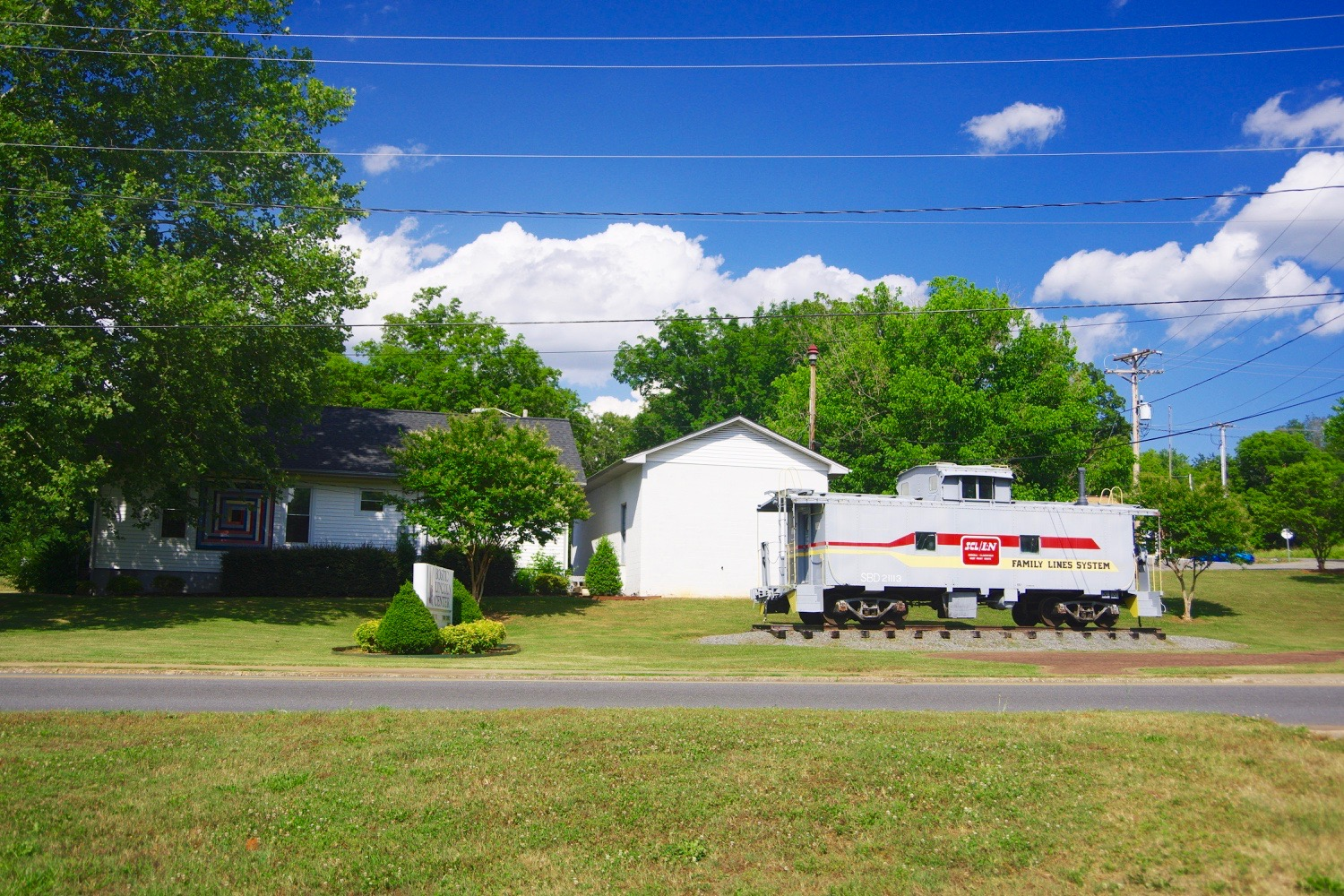
Bostic Lincoln Center and SCL caboose

Bostic has long been a stop for the Seaboard Air Line (later Seaboard Coast Line), now CSXT, to exchange crews with the former Clinchfield Railroad. CSXT also operates the former SAL/CRR yard, located just northwest of town. Bostic has only three caution signals and no red lights. There is a Seaboard Coast Line caboose on display at the center of town. The caboose is painted in the 1970s Family Lines System scheme.

Bostic was nearly the terminus for the Clinchfield Railroad before Spartanburg, South Carolina was chosen as the terminus.

== Notable people ==
- William Chivous Bostic Sr. – prominent doctor and son of the town's namesake
- Merle Davis Umstead – served as First Lady of North Carolina
- Phil Prince, 12th president of Clemson University
- Lewis Jolley – running back for the Houston Oilers
