= George W. Logan House =

Historic house in North Carolina, United States

- U.S. National Register of Historic Places
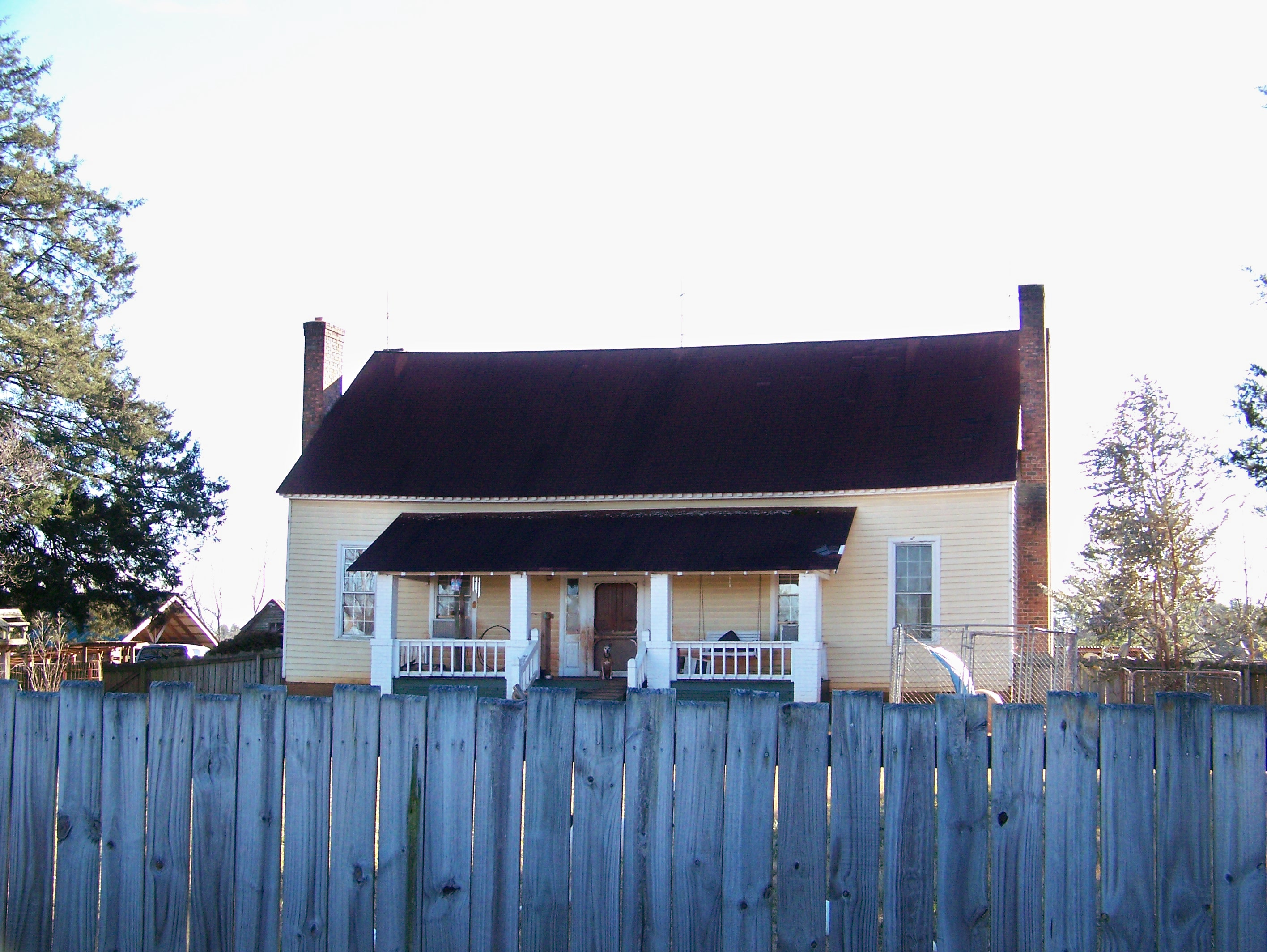
- George W. Logan House, February 2014

- Location within North Carolina Location within the United States
- Location: SR 1555 at U.S. Route 64, near Rutherfordton, North Carolina
- Coordinates: 35°25′02″N 81°53′56″W
- Area: 13.4 acres (5.4 ha)
- Built: 1842
- Architectural style: Georgian
- NRHP reference No.: 86000312
- Added to NRHP: February 20, 1986

George W. Logan House, also known as Jobe Hill, is a historic home located near Rutherfordton, Rutherford County, North Carolina. It built about 1842, and is a one-story, five-bay, Georgian plan frame dwelling. It is sheathed in weatherboard, has a side gable roof, and two rebuilt exterior end chimneys. It was enlarged and remodeled in the 1890s and in 1985. Also on the property are the contributing brick well house, dairy, outhouse, smokehouse, granary, log double corncrib, and a large log barn. It was the home of prominent North Carolina politician George Washington Logan (1815-1889).

It was added to the National Register of Historic Places in 1986.
